= 10th Arunachal Pradesh Assembly =

Arunachal Pradesh Legislative Assembly
- 10th Legislative Assembly of Arunachal Pradesh

Type
- Type: Unicameral
- Term limits: 5 years

Leadership
- Speaker: Pasang Dorjee Sona, BJP since May 2019
- Deputy Speaker: Tesam Pongte, BJP since May 2019
- Leader of the House (Chief Minister): Pema Khandu, BJP since May 2019
- Deputy Chief Minister: Chowna Mein, BJP since May 2019
- Leader of the Opposition: Vacant

Structure
- Seats: 60
- Political groups: Government (53); NDA (53): BJP (51); NPP (2); Other opposition (4): INC (2); AITC (1); IND (1); Vacant (3): Vacant (3)

Elections
- Voting system: First past the post
- Last election: May 2019
- Next election: May 2024

Meeting place
- Vidhan Bhavan, Itanagar, Arunachal Pradesh

Website
- arla.neva.gov.in

The Tenth Legislative Assembly of Arunachal Pradesh was constituted after the 2019 Arunachal Pradesh Legislative Assembly elections, which were concluded on 11 April 2019, and the previous assembly term ending on 1 June 2019.

== Notable positions ==
The present assembly is the Tenth Legislative Assembly of Arunachal Pradesh.

| S.No | Position | Portrait | Name | Party | Constituency | Office Taken |
|---|---|---|---|---|---|---|
| 01 | Speaker | | Pasang Dorjee Sona | Bharatiya Janata Party | Mechuka | 4 June 2019 |
| 02 | Deputy Speaker | | Tesam Pongte | Bharatiya Janata Party | Changlang North | 4 June 2019 |
| 03 | Leader of the House | | Pema Khandu | Bharatiya Janata Party | Mukto | 29 May 2019 |
| 04 | Deputy Chief Minister | | Chowna Mein | Bharatiya Janata Party | Chowkham | 29 May 2019 |
| 05 | Leader of Opposition | Vacant | | | | |
| 06 | Deputy Leader of Opposition | Vacant | | | | |

== Members of Legislative Assembly ==
| District | No. | Constituency | Reserved | Name | Party | Alliance | Remarks |
|---|---|---|---|---|---|---|---|
| Tawang | 1 | Lumla | ST | Jambey Tashi | Bharatiya Janata Party | NDA | Died on 2 November 2022 |
| Tawang | 1 | Lumla | ST | Tsering Lhamu | Bharatiya Janata Party | NDA | Elected Unopposed on 10 February 2023 |
| Tawang | 2 | Tawang | ST | Tsering Tashi | Bharatiya Janata Party | NDA | |
| Tawang | 3 | Mukto | ST | Pema Khandu | Bharatiya Janata Party | NDA | |
| West Kameng | 4 | Dirang | ST | Phurpa Tsering | Bharatiya Janata Party | NDA | |
| West Kameng | 5 | Kalaktang | ST | Dorjee Wangdi Kharma | Janata Dal (United) | Others | Switched from JD(U) to BJP |
| West Kameng | 5 | Kalaktang | ST | Dorjee Wangdi Kharma | Bharatiya Janata Party | NDA | Switched from JD(U) to BJP |
| West Kameng | 6 | Thrizino-Buragaon | ST | Kumsi Sidisow | Bharatiya Janata Party | NDA | |
| West Kameng | 7 | Bomdila | ST | Dongru Siongju | Janata Dal (United) | Others | Switched from JD(U) to BJP |
| West Kameng | 7 | Bomdila | ST | Dongru Siongju | Bharatiya Janata Party | NDA | Switched from JD(U) to BJP |
| East Kameng | 8 | Bameng | ST | Goruk Pordung | Bharatiya Janata Party | NDA | |
| East Kameng | 9 | Chayangtajo | ST | Hayeng Mangfi | Janata Dal (United) | Others | Switched from JD(U) to BJP |
| East Kameng | 9 | Chayangtajo | ST | Hayeng Mangfi | Bharatiya Janata Party | NDA | Switched from JD(U) to BJP |
| East Kameng | 10 | Seppa East | ST | Tapuk Taku | National People's Party | NDA | |
| East Kameng | 11 | Seppa West | ST | Mama Natung | Bharatiya Janata Party | NDA | |
| Pakke-Kessang | 12 | Pakke-Kasang | ST | Biyuram Wahge | Bharatiya Janata Party | NDA | |
| Papum Pare | 13 | Itanagar | ST | Techi Kaso | Janata Dal (United) | Others | Switched from JD(U) to BJP |
| Papum Pare | 13 | Itanagar | ST | Techi Kaso | Bharatiya Janata Party | NDA | Switched from JD(U) to BJP |
| Papum Pare | 14 | Doimukh | ST | Tana Hali Tara | Bharatiya Janata Party | NDA | |
| Papum Pare | 15 | Sagalee | ST | Nabam Tuki | Indian National Congress | UPA | |
| Lower Subansiri | 16 | Yachuli | ST | Taba Tedir | Bharatiya Janata Party | NDA | |
| Lower Subansiri | 17 | Ziro-Hapoli | ST | Tage Taki | Bharatiya Janata Party | NDA | |
| Kra-Daadi | 18 | Palin | ST | Balo Raja | Bharatiya Janata Party | NDA | |
| Kurung Kumey | 19 | Nyapin | ST | Bamang Felix | Bharatiya Janata Party | NDA | |
| Kra-Daadi | 20 | Tali | ST | Jikke Tako | Janata Dal (United) | Others | Switched from JD(U) to BJP |
| Kra-Daadi | 20 | Tali | ST | Jikke Tako | Bharatiya Janata Party | NDA | Switched from JD(U) to BJP |
| Kurung Kumey | 21 | Koloriang | ST | Lokam Tassar | Bharatiya Janata Party | NDA | |
| Upper Subansiri | 22 | Nacho | ST | Nakap Nalo | Bharatiya Janata Party | NDA | |
| Upper Subansiri | 23 | Taliha | ST | Nyato Rigia | Bharatiya Janata Party | NDA | |
| Upper Subansiri | 24 | Daporijo | ST | Taniya Soki | Bharatiya Janata Party | NDA | |
| Kamle | 25 | Raga | ST | Tarin Dapke | National People's Party | NDA | |
| Upper Subansiri | 26 | Damporijo | ST | Rode Bui | Bharatiya Janata Party | NDA | |
| West Siang | 27 | Liromoba | ST | Nyamar Karbak | Bharatiya Janata Party | NDA | |
| Lower Siang | 28 | Likabali | ST | Kardo Nyigyor | People's Party of Arunachal | Others | Switched from PPA to BJP |
| Lower Siang | 28 | Likabali | ST | Kardo Nyigyor | Bharatiya Janata Party | NDA | Switched from PPA to BJP |
| Lepa Rada | 29 | Basar | ST | Gokar Basar | National People's Party | NDA | Switched from NPP to BJP |
| Lepa Rada | 29 | Basar | ST | Gokar Basar | Bharatiya Janata Party | NDA | Switched from NPP to BJP |
| West Siang | 30 | Along West | ST | Tumke Bagra | Bharatiya Janata Party | NDA | |
| West Siang | 31 | Along East | ST | Kento Jini | Bharatiya Janata Party | NDA | |
| Siang | 32 | Rumgong | ST | Talem Taboh | Janata Dal (United) | Others | Switched from JD(U) to BJP |
| Siang | 32 | Rumgong | ST | Talem Taboh | Bharatiya Janata Party | NDA | Switched from JD(U) to BJP |
| Shi Yomi | 33 | Mechuka | ST | Pasang Dorjee Sona | Bharatiya Janata Party | NDA | |
| Upper Siang | 34 | Tuting-Yingkiong | ST | Alo Libang | Bharatiya Janata Party | NDA | |
| Siang | 35 | Pangin | ST | Ojing Tasing | Bharatiya Janata Party | NDA | |
| Lower Siang | 36 | Nari-Koyu | ST | Kento Rina | Bharatiya Janata Party | NDA | |
| East Siang | 37 | Pasighat West | ST | Ninong Ering | Indian National Congress | UPA | Switched from INC to BJP |
| East Siang | 37 | Pasighat West | ST | Ninong Ering | Bharatiya Janata Party | NDA | Switched from INC to BJP |
| East Siang | 38 | Pasighat East | ST | Kaling Moyong | Bharatiya Janata Party | NDA | |
| East Siang | 39 | Mebo | ST | Lombo Tayeng | Indian National Congress | UPA | Switched from INC to BJP |
| East Siang | 39 | Mebo | ST | Lombo Tayeng | Bharatiya Janata Party | NDA | Switched from INC to BJP |
| Upper Siang | 40 | Mariyang-Geku | ST | Kanggong Taku | Janata Dal (United) | Others | Switched from JD(U) to BJP |
| Upper Siang | 40 | Mariyang-Geku | ST | Kanggong Taku | Bharatiya Janata Party | NDA | Switched from JD(U) to BJP |
| Dibang Valley | 41 | Anini | ST | Mopi Mihu | Bharatiya Janata Party | NDA | |
| Lower Dibang Valley | 42 | Dambuk | ST | Gum Tayeng | Bharatiya Janata Party | NDA | |
| Lower Dibang Valley | 43 | Roing | ST | Mutchu Mithi | National People's Party | NDA | Switched from NPP to BJP |
| Lower Dibang Valley | 43 | Roing | ST | Mutchu Mithi | Bharatiya Janata Party | NDA | Switched from NPP to BJP |
| Lohit | 44 | Tezu | ST | Karikho Kri | Independent | NDA | Election Declared Null and Void |
| Lohit | 44 | Tezu | ST | Vacant | | | |
| Anjaw | 45 | Hayuliang | ST | Dasanglu Pul | Bharatiya Janata Party | NDA | Election declared null and void by Guwahati HC on 26 April 2023. |
| Anjaw | 45 | Hayuliang | ST | Vacant | | | |
| Namsai | 46 | Chowkham | ST | Chowna Mein | Bharatiya Janata Party | NDA | |
| Namsai | 47 | Namsai | ST | Chau Zingnu Namchoom | Bharatiya Janata Party | NDA | |
| Namsai | 48 | Lekang | ST | Jummum Ete Deori | Bharatiya Janata Party | NDA | |
| Changlang | 49 | Bordumsa-Diyun | None | Somlung Mossang | Independent | NDA | |
| Changlang | 50 | Miao | ST | Kamlung Mosang | Bharatiya Janata Party | NDA | |
| Changlang | 51 | Nampong | ST | Laisam Simai | Bharatiya Janata Party | NDA | |
| Changlang | 52 | Changlang South | ST | Phosum Khimhun | Bharatiya Janata Party | NDA | Died on 9 March 2024. |
| Changlang | 52 | Changlang South | ST | Vacant | | | |
| Changlang | 53 | Changlang North | ST | Tesam Pongte | Bharatiya Janata Party | NDA | |
| Tirap | 54 | Namsang | ST | Wangki Lowang | Bharatiya Janata Party | NDA | |
| Tirap | 55 | Khonsa East | ST | Wanglam Sawin | Bharatiya Janata Party | NDA | |
| Tirap | 56 | Khonsa West | ST | Tirong Aboh | National People's Party | NDA | Died on 21 May 2019 |
| Tirap | 56 | Khonsa West | ST | Chakat Aboh | Independent | Others | Won in 2019 bypoll |
| Tirap | 56 | Khonsa West | ST | Chakat Aboh | Bharatiya Janata Party | NDA | Switched from Independent to BJP |
| Tirap | 57 | Borduria-Bagapani | ST | Wanglin Lowangdong | Indian National Congress | UPA | Switched from INC to BJP |
| Tirap | 57 | Borduria-Bagapani | ST | Wanglin Lowangdong | Bharatiya Janata Party | NDA | Switched from INC to BJP |
| Longding | 58 | Kanubari | ST | Gabriel Denwang Wangsu | Bharatiya Janata Party | NDA | |
| Longding | 59 | Longding-Pumao | ST | Tanpho Wangnaw | Bharatiya Janata Party | NDA | |
| Longding | 60 | Pongchau-Wakka | ST | Honchun Ngandam | Bharatiya Janata Party | NDA | |

== See also ==
- 2019 Arunachal Pradesh Legislative Assembly election
- Arunachal Pradesh Legislative Assembly
- List of constituencies of the Arunachal Pradesh Legislative Assembly
- Government of Arunachal Pradesh
- List of governors of Arunachal Pradesh
- List of chief ministers of Arunachal Pradesh
