= 11th Arunachal Pradesh Assembly =

Arunachal Pradesh Assembly

←	10th	12th	→

Overview
- Term: 14 June 2024 – May 2029
- Election: 2024 Arunachal Pradesh Legislative Assembly election
- Government: Pema khandu Ministry
- Opposition: Vacant

Sovereign
- Governor: Kaiwalya Trivikram Parnaik
- Party control: NDA
- Speaker of the House: Tesam Pongte
- Chief Minister: Pema Khandu
- Deputy Chief Minister: Chowna Mein

The Eighth Legislative Assembly of Arunachal Pradesh is constituted after the 2024 Arunachal Pradesh Legislative Assembly elections, which were concluded on 19 April 2024.

== Notable positions ==
The present assembly is the Eighth Legislative Assembly of Arunachal Pradesh.

Office	Holder	Since
Speaker	Tesam Pongte	14 June 2024
Leader of the House (Chief Minister)	Pema Khandu	17 July 2016
Deputy Chief Minister	Chowna Mein	19 February 2016
Leader of the Opposition	Vacant	

== Composition ==
Alliance	Political Party	No. of MLAs	Leader
Government; NDA; Seats: 46	Bharatiya Janata Party	46	Pema Khandu
Confidence and Supply; Seats: 13	People's Party of Arunachal	6	Nabam Vivek
Confidence and Supply; Seats: 13	Nationalist Congress Party	3	Nikh Kamin
Confidence and Supply; Seats: 13	Independent	3	
Confidence and Supply; Seats: 13	National People's Party (India)	1	Thangwang Wangham
Opposition; Seat: 1	Indian National Congress	1	Kumar Waii

== Members of Legislative Assembly ==
District	No.	Constituency	Name	Party	Remarks
Tawang	1	Lumla (ST)	Tsering Lhamu	Bharatiya Janata Party	
Tawang	2	Tawang (ST)	Namgey Tsering	People's Party of Arunachal	Switched from NPP to PPA
Tawang	3	Mukto (ST)	Pema Khandu	Bharatiya Janata Party	Chief Minister
West Kameng	4	Dirang (ST)	Phurpa Tsering	Bharatiya Janata Party	
West Kameng	5	Kalaktang (ST)	Tseten Chombay Kee	Bharatiya Janata Party	
West Kameng	6	Thrizino-Buragaon (ST)	Tenzin Nyima Glow	Independent	
West Kameng	7	Bomdila (ST)	Dongru Siongju	Bharatiya Janata Party	
East Kameng	8	Bameng (ST)	Kumar Waii	Indian National Congress	
East Kameng	9	Chayangtajo (ST)	Hayeng Mangfi	Bharatiya Janata Party	
East Kameng	10	Seppa East (ST)	Ealing Tallang	Bharatiya Janata Party	
East Kameng	11	Seppa West (ST)	Mama Natung	Bharatiya Janata Party	Cabinet Minister
Pakke-Kessang	12	Pakke-Kessang (ST)	Biyuram Wahge	Bharatiya Janata Party	Cabinet Minister
Papum Pare	13	Itanagar (ST)	Techi Kaso	Bharatiya Janata Party	
Papum Pare	14	Doimukh (ST)	Nabam Vivek	People's Party of Arunachal	
Papum Pare	15	Sagalee (ST)	Ratu Techi	Bharatiya Janata Party	
Lower Subansiri	16	Yachuli (ST)	Toko Tatung	Nationalist Congress Party	
Lower Subansiri	17	Ziro–Hapoli (ST)	Hage Appa	Bharatiya Janata Party	
Kra-Daadi	18	Palin (ST)	Balo Raja	Bharatiya Janata Party	Cabinet Minister
Kurung Kumey	19	Nyapin (ST)	Tai Nikio	Bharatiya Janata Party	
Kra-Daadi	20	Tali (ST)	Jikke Tako	Bharatiya Janata Party	
Kurung Kumey	21	Koloriang (ST)	Pani Taram	Bharatiya Janata Party	
Upper Subansiri	22	Nacho (ST)	Nakap Nalo	Bharatiya Janata Party	
Upper Subansiri	23	Taliha (ST)	Nyato Dukam	Bharatiya Janata Party	Cabinet Minister
Upper Subansiri	24	Daporijo (ST)	Taniya Soki	Bharatiya Janata Party	
Kamle	25	Raga (ST)	Rotom Tebin	Bharatiya Janata Party	
Upper Subansiri	26	Dumporijo (ST)	Rode Bui	Bharatiya Janata Party	
West Siang	27	Liromoba (ST)	Pesi Jilen	People's Party of Arunachal	Switched from NPP to PPA
Lower Siang	28	Likabali (ST)	Kardo Nyigyor	Bharatiya Janata Party	
Lepa Rada	29	Basar (ST)	Nyabi Jini Dirchi	Bharatiya Janata Party	
West Siang	30	Along West (ST)	Topin Ete	Bharatiya Janata Party	
West Siang	31	Along East (ST)	Kento Jini	Bharatiya Janata Party	Cabinet Minister
Siang	32	Rumgong (ST)	Talem Taboh	Bharatiya Janata Party	
Shi Yomi	33	Mechuka (ST)	Pasang Dorjee Sona	Bharatiya Janata Party	Cabinet Minister
Upper Siang	34	Tuting–Yingkiong (ST)	Alo Libang	Bharatiya Janata Party	
Siang	35	Pangin (ST)	Ojing Tasing	Bharatiya Janata Party	Cabinet Minister
Lower Siang	36	Nari-Koyu (ST)	Tojir Kadu	Bharatiya Janata Party	
East Siang	37	Pasighat West (ST)	Ninong Ering	Bharatiya Janata Party	
East Siang	38	Pasighat East (ST)	Tapi Darang	People's Party of Arunachal	Switched from NPP to PPA
East Siang	39	Mebo (ST)	Oken Tayeng	People's Party of Arunachal	
Upper Siang	40	Mariyang-Geku (ST)	Oni Panyang	People's Party of Arunachal	Switched from NPP to PPA
Dibang Valley	41	Anini (ST)	Mopi Mihu	Bharatiya Janata Party	
Lower Dibang Valley	42	Dambuk (ST)	Puinnyo Apum	Bharatiya Janata Party	
Lower Dibang Valley	43	Roing (ST)	Mutchu Mithi	Bharatiya Janata Party	
Lohit	44	Tezu (ST)	Mahesh Chai	Bharatiya Janata Party	
Anjaw	45	Hayuliang (ST)	Dasanglu Pul	Bharatiya Janata Party	Cabinet Minister
Namsai	46	Chowkham (ST)	Chowna Mein	Bharatiya Janata Party	Deputy Chief Minister
Namsai	47	Namsai (ST)	Chau Zingnu Namchoom	Bharatiya Janata Party	
Namsai	48	Lekang (ST)	Lekhiya Soni	Nationalist Congress Party	
Changlang	49	Bordumsa-Diyun	Nikh Kamin	Nationalist Congress Party	
Changlang	50	Miao (ST)	Kamlung Mossang	Bharatiya Janata Party	
Changlang	51	Nampong (ST)	Laisam Simai	Independent	
Changlang	52	Changlang South (ST)	Hamjong Tangha	Bharatiya Janata Party	
Changlang	53	Changlang North(ST)	Tesam Pongte	Bharatiya Janata Party	Speaker of the House
Tirap	54	Namsang (ST)	Wangki Lowang	Bharatiya Janata Party	
Tirap	55	Khonsa East (ST)	Wanglam Sawin	Independent	
Tirap	56	Khonsa West (ST)	Chakat Aboh	Bharatiya Janata Party	
Tirap	57	Borduria–Bagapani (ST)	Wanglin Lowangdong	Bharatiya Janata Party	
Longding	58	Kanubari (ST)	Gabriel Denwang Wangsu	Bharatiya Janata Party	Cabinet Minister
Longding	59	Longding–Pumao (ST)	Thangwang Wangham	National People's Party	
Longding	60	Pongchau-Wakka (ST)	Honchun Ngandam	Bharatiya Janata Party	

== See also ==
- 2024 Arunachal Pradesh Legislative Assembly election
- Arunachal Pradesh Legislative Assembly
- List of constituencies of the Arunachal Pradesh Legislative Assembly
- Government of Arunachal Pradesh
- List of governors of Arunachal Pradesh
- List of chief ministers of Arunachal Pradesh
