= National Democratic Alliance =

Indian political alliance led by the BJP

- Abbreviation: NDA
- Chairperson: Amit Shah
- Rajya Sabha Leader: J. P. Nadda
- Lok Sabha Leader: Narendra Modi (Prime Minister)
- Founder: Atal Bihari Vajpayee; Lal Krishna Advani; Pramod Mahajan (Bharatiya Janata Party)
- Founded: 15 May 1998; 28 years ago
- Ideology: National conservatism; Right-wing populism; Hindutva (factions)
- Political position: Right-wing (Note: Members consists of centre-left to far-right parties.)
- Alliance: 39 parties: NEDA (Northeast India); Kutami (Andhra Pradesh); MDA (Meghalaya); MY (Maharashtra); AIADMK+ (Tamil Nadu); PDA (Nagaland)
- Seats in Rajya Sabha: 153 / 245
- Seats in Lok Sabha: 319 / 543
- Seats in State Legislative Councils: 245 / 426
- Seats in State Legislative Assemblies: 2,534 / 4,126
- Number of states and union territories in government: 22 / 31

The National Democratic Alliance (NDA) is an Indian multi-party political alliance, led by the country's biggest political party, the Bharatiya Janata Party (BJP). It was founded on 15 May 1998. It currently has a majority in both the Rajya Sabha and the Lok Sabha, and controls the Government of India as well as the governments of 20 out of 28 Indian states and 2 out of 3 Union territories with legislative assemblies.

Its first chairman was then Prime Minister of India, Atal Bihari Vajpayee, who served from 1998 until 2004. L. K. Advani, the former Deputy Prime Minister, took over as chairman in 2004 and served until 2014. Amit Shah has been the chairman since 2014.

The NDA controlled a majority in the Indian Parliament from 1998 to 2004. The alliance returned to power in the 2014 general elections with a combined vote share of 38.5%. BJP leader, Narendra Modi, was sworn in as Prime Minister of India on 26 May 2014, his party having won 282 of the 520 seats in the lower house. In the 2019 general election, the alliance further increased its tally to 353 seats with a combined vote share of 45.43%. The alliance lost 60 seats in the 2024 general election, but retained sufficient seats to form a coalition government. On 7 June 2024, Modi confirmed the support of 293 MPs to President Droupadi Murmu; he was then asked by her to form a government. This marked Modi's third term as Prime Minister and his first time heading a coalition government, with the Telugu Desam Party of Andhra Pradesh and Janata Dal (United) of Bihar emerging as two main allies.

== History ==
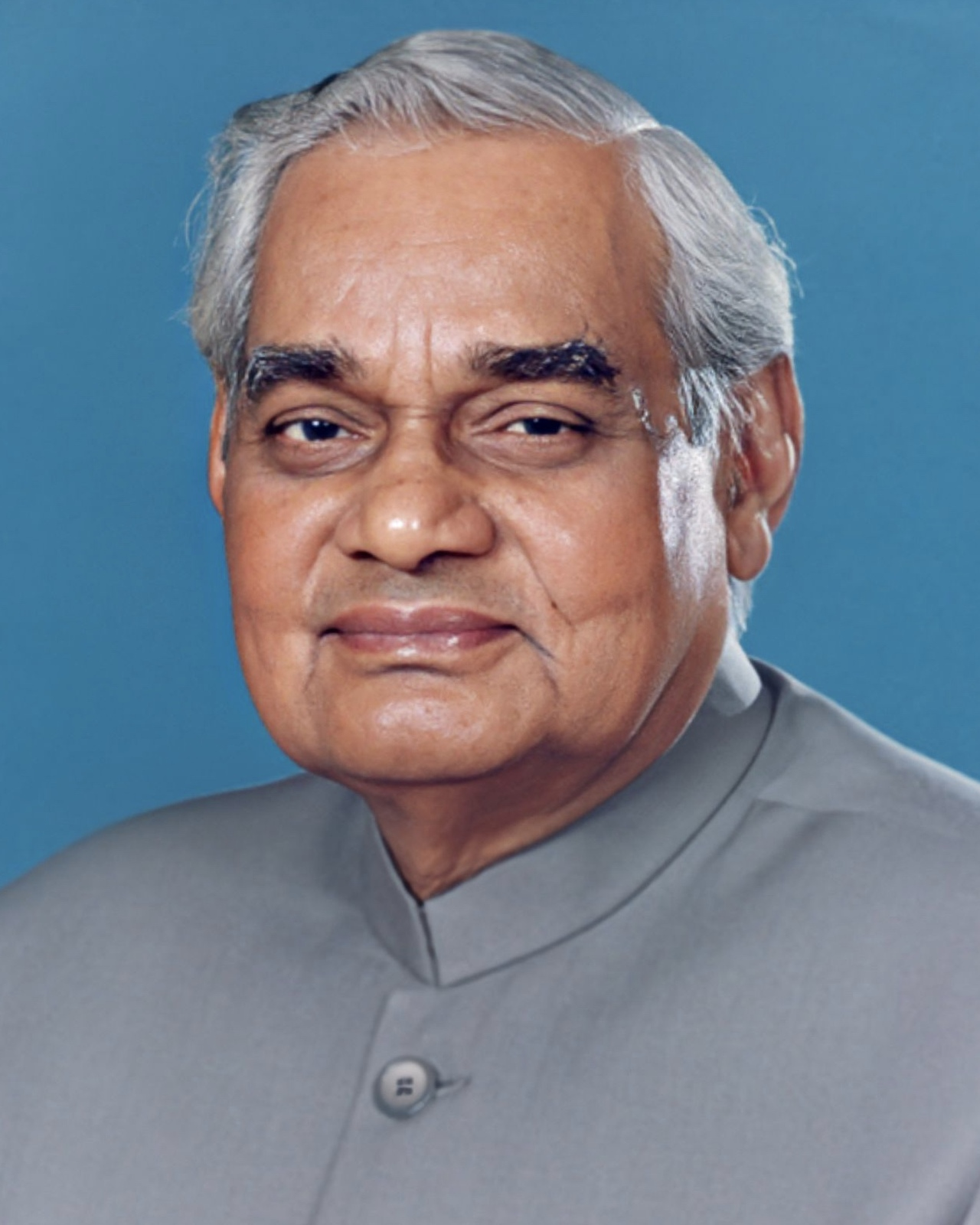
Atal Bihari Vajpayee, first Prime Minister from NDA

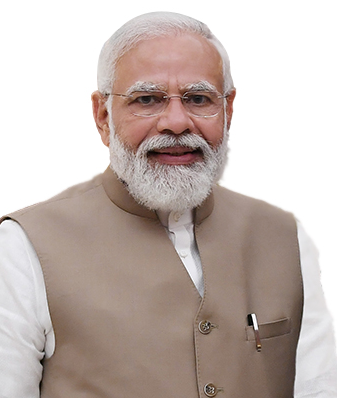
Narendra Modi, second and current Prime Minister from NDA

The NDA was formed in May 1998 as a coalition to contest the general elections. The main aim of the NDA was to form an anti-Indian National Congress coalition. It was led by the BJP, and included several regional parties, including the Samata Party and the AIADMK, as well as Shiv Sena, but Shiv Sena broke away from the alliance in 2019 to join the Maha Vikas Aghadi with Congress and the NCP. Samata Party also broke away from the alliance in 2003 after formation of Janta Dal (United). The Shiv Sena was the only member which shared the Hindutva ideology of the BJP.

After the election, it was able to muster a slim majority with outside support from the Telugu Desam Party, allowing Atal Bihari Vajpayee to return as prime minister.

The government collapsed within a year because J. Jayalalithaa's AIADMK withdrew its support. After the entry of a few more regional parties, the NDA proceeded to win the 1999 elections with a larger majority. Vajpayee became Prime Minister for a third time, and this time served a full five-year term.

The NDA then called elections in early 2004, six months ahead of schedule. Its campaign was based around the slogan of "India Shining" which attempted to depict the NDA government as responsible for a rapid economic transformation of the country. However, the NDA suffered a defeat, winning only a 186 seats in the lower house, the Lok Sabha, compared to 222 of the United Progressive Alliance led by the Congress. Manmohan Singh thus succeeded Vajpayee as prime minister, serving for ten years 2004–14. Commentators have argued that the NDA's defeat was due to a failure to reach out to the rural masses. The political situation, however, changed again with the rise of NDA-aligned Gujarati Chief Minister, Narendra Modi, who went on to become India's Prime Minister following the NDA's success in the election of 2014.

== Structure ==
The National Democratic Alliance does not have a formal governing structure such as an executive board or politburo. It has been up to the leaders of the individual parties to make decisions on issues such as sharing of seats in elections, allocation of ministries and other issues that arise in parliament or more broadly. Given the varied ideologies among the parties, there have been many cases of disagreement and split voting amongst the allies making up the Alliance.

Owing to ill health, George Fernandes, who was the NDA convener until 2008, was discharged of his responsibility and replaced by Sharad Yadav, the then national president of the JD(U) political party. On 16 June 2013, the JD(U) left the coalition and Sharad Yadav resigned from the role of the NDA convener. Then the Chief Minister of Andhra Pradesh N. Chandrababu Naidu was made the NDA convener. Later in 2018, after the withdrawal of TDP from NDA the post of convenor was vacant. However NDA allies like LJP demanded the appointment of a convenor in 2019 for better coordination of the allies.

On 27 July 2017, JD(U) with the help of BJP formed the government in Bihar. Later, on 19 August 2017, JD(U) formally rejoined the NDA after 4 years.

List of Chairmen

1. Atal Bihari Vajpayee – 1998 to 2004.
2. L. K. Advani – 2004 to 2014.
3. Amit Shah – 2014 to date.

List of Convenors

1. George Fernandes – 1998 to 2008.
2. Sharad Yadav – 2008 to 2013.
3. N. Chandrababu Naidu – 2013 to 2018.

== Strength in parliament ==
=== Party wise ===
Party	Lok Sabha	Rajya Sabha	States/UTs
Bharatiya Janata Party	241	118	National party
Nationalist Citizens Party of India	20	0	West Bengal
Telugu Desam Party	16	4	Andhra Pradesh
Shiv Sena	13	2	Maharashtra
Janata Dal (United)	12	4	Bihar
Lok Janshakti Party (Ram Vilas)	5	0	Bihar
Rashtriya Lok Dal	2	1	Uttar Pradesh
Janata Dal (Secular)	2	0	Karnataka
Janasena Party	2	1	Andhra Pradesh
Nationalist Congress Party	1	4	Maharashtra
Asom Gana Parishad	1	1	Assam
All Jharkhand Students Union	1	0	Jharkhand
Apna Dal (Sonelal)	1	0	Uttar Pradesh
Hindustani Awam Morcha	1	0	Bihar
Sikkim Krantikari Morcha	1	0	Sikkim
All India Anna Dravida Munnetra Kazhagam	0	4	Tamil Nadu
Rashtriya Lok Morcha	0	1	Bihar
National People's Party	0	1	National party
Republican Party of India (Athawale)	0	1	Maharashtra
Pattali Makkal Katchi	0	1	Tamil Nadu
Tamil Maanila Congress (Moopanar)	0	0	Tamil Nadu
Bodoland People's Front	0	0	Assam
Amma Makkal Munnetra Kazhagam	0	0	Tamil Nadu
Naga People's Front	0	0	Nagaland
Suheldev Bharatiya Samaj Party	0	0	Uttar Pradesh
Maharashtrawadi Gomantak Party	0	0	Goa
All India N.R. Congress	0	0	Puducherry
Bharath Dharma Jana Sena	0	0	Kerala
Twenty20 Kizhakkambalam	0	0	Kerala
Indigenous People's Front of Tripura	0	0	Tripura
Rashtriya Samaj Paksha	0	0	Maharashtra
United Democratic Party	0	0	Meghalaya
Hill State People's Democratic Party	0	0	Meghalaya
Haryana Lokhit Party	0	0	Haryana
Kerala Kamaraj Congress	0	0	Kerala
Gorkha National Liberation Front	0	0	West Bengal
Jan Surajya Shakti	0	0	Maharashtra
Independent	0	3	Haryana Odisha Jharkhand
NOM	0	7	None
Total	319	153	India

=== State/UT wise MPS ===
State/UT	Seats		BJP		NDA Allies			Overall Tally
State/UT	LS	RS	LS	RS	Party	LS	RS	Overall Tally
States
Andhra Pradesh	25	11	3	2	TDP	16	4	21 / 25 7 / 11
Andhra Pradesh	25	11	3	2	JSP	2	1	21 / 25 7 / 11
Arunachal Pradesh	2	1	2	1	None			2 / 2 1 / 1
Assam	14	7	10	4	AGP	1	1	11 / 14 5 / 7
Bihar	40	16	12	7	JD(U)	12	4	30 / 40 12 / 16
Bihar	40	16	12	7	LJP(RV)	5	0	30 / 40 12 / 16
Bihar	40	16	12	7	HAM(S)	1	0	30 / 40 12 / 16
Bihar	40	16	12	7	RLM	0	1	30 / 40 12 / 16
Chhattisgarh	11	5	10	2	None			10 / 11 2 / 5
Goa	2	1	1	1	None			1 / 2 1 / 1
Gujarat	26	11	25	11	None			25 / 26 11 / 11
Haryana	10	5	5	3	Independent	0	1	5 / 10 4 / 5
Himachal Pradesh	4	3	4	2	None			4 / 4 2 / 3
Jharkhand	14	6	8	3	AJSU	1	0	9 / 14 3 / 6
Karnataka	28	12	17	5	JD(S)	2	0	19 / 28 5 / 12
Kerala	20	9	1	0	None			1 / 20 0 / 9
Madhya Pradesh	29	11	29	9	None			29 / 29 9 / 11
Maharashtra	48	19	9	8	SHS	13	2	23 / 48 15 / 19
Maharashtra	48	19	9	8	NCP	1	4	23 / 48 15 / 19
Maharashtra	48	19	9	8	RPI(A)	0	1	23 / 48 15 / 19
Manipur	2	1	0	1	None			0 / 2 1 / 1
Meghalaya	2	1	0	0	NPP	0	1	0 / 2 1 / 1
Mizoram	1	1	0	0	None			0 / 1 0 / 1
Nagaland	1	1	0	1	None			0 / 1 1 / 1
Odisha	21	10	20	5	None			20 / 21 5 / 10
Punjab	13	7	0	6	None			0 / 13 6 / 7
Rajasthan	25	10	14	5	None			14 / 25 5 / 10
Sikkim	1	1	0	1	SKM	1	0	1 / 1 1 / 1
Tamil Nadu	39	18	0	0	AIADMK	0	4	0 / 39 5 / 18
Tamil Nadu	39	18	0	0	PMK	0	1	0 / 39 5 / 18
Telangana	17	7	8	0	None			8 / 17 0 / 7
Tripura	2	1	2	1	None			2 / 2 1 / 1
Uttar Pradesh	80	31	33	24	RLD	2	1	36 / 80 25 / 31
Uttar Pradesh	80	31	33	24	AD(S)	1	0	36 / 80 25 / 31
Uttarakhand	5	3	5	3	None			5 / 5 3 / 3
West Bengal	42	16	12	7	NCPI	20	0	32 / 42 7 / 16
Union Territories
Andaman and Nicobar Islands	1		1		None			1 / 1
Chandigarh	1		0		None			0 / 1
Dadra and Nagar Haveli and Daman and Diu	2		1		None			1 / 2
Delhi	7	3	7	1	None			7 / 7 1 / 3
Jammu and Kashmir	5	4	2	1	None			2 / 5 1 / 4
Ladakh	1		0		None			0 / 1
Lakshadweep	1		0		None			0 / 1
Puducherry	1	1	0	1	None			0 / 1 1 / 1
Nominated		12		5	Nom		7	12 / 12
Total	543	245	241	118	Allies	78	35	319 / 543 153 / 245

== State governments ==
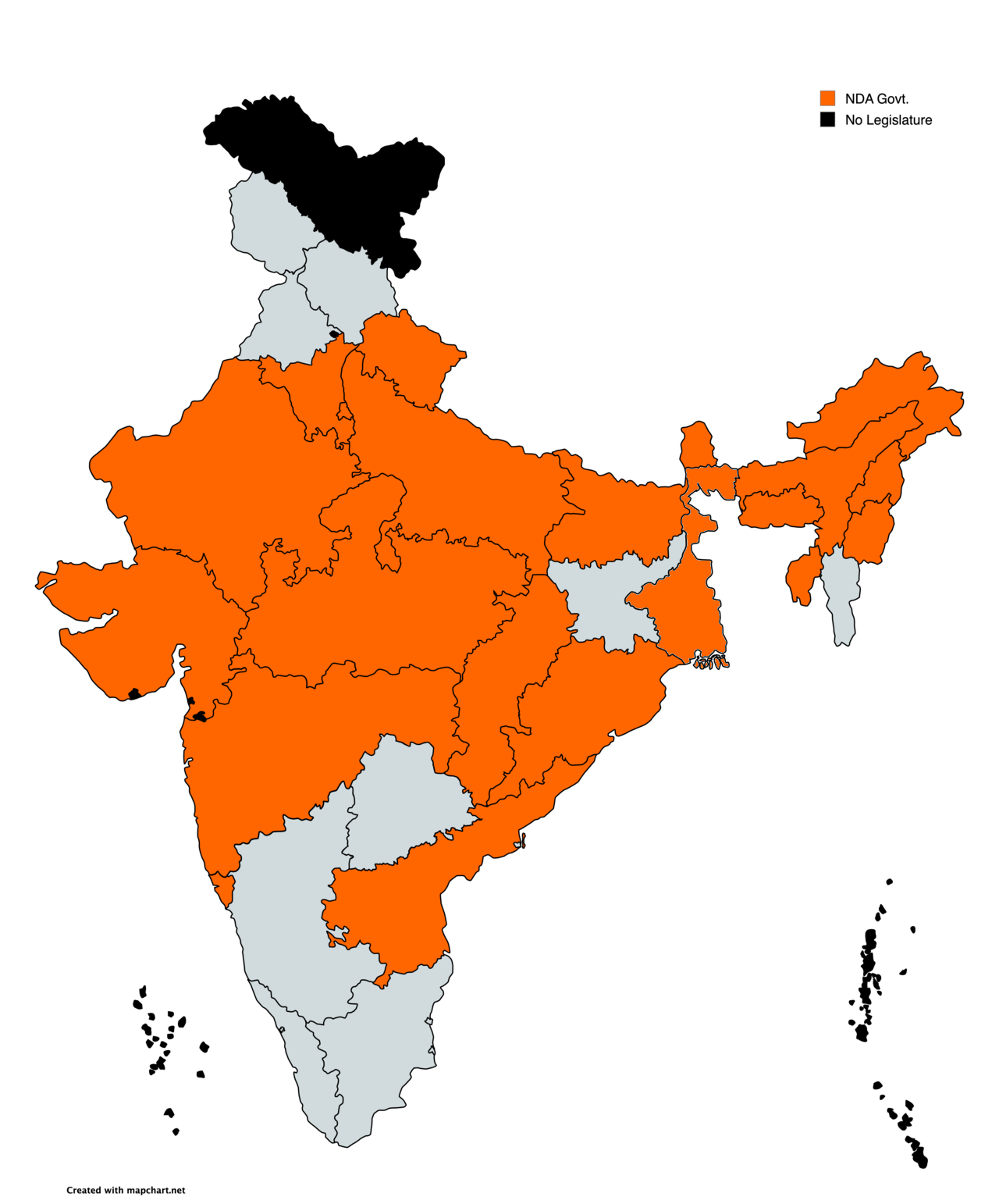
States run by the NDA government as of May 2026

The NDA is currently in power in 20 states and 2 union territories of India (out of 28 states and 3 union territories).

The NDA has never been in power in two states: Kerala and Telangana (between 1999 and 2004, BJP in alliance with TDP ruled a united Andhra Pradesh). But BJP led NDA has ruled many local governing institutions including corporations, municipalities, panchayats and has also been elected to many Lok Sabha constituencies, state assembly constituencies and local body divisions and wards in these 2 states.

17 states and 1 union territory currently have a deputy chief minister, with 9 of them having two deputy chief ministers each. 12 of these states have deputy ministers from NDA, making for 23 of 28 incumbents.

S.No	State/UT	NDA Govt since	Chief Minister						Alliance Partners	Seats	Last election
S.No	State/UT	NDA Govt since	Portrait	Name Cabinet	Party	Seats	Since	Deputy(s)	Alliance Partners	Seats	Last election
1	Andhra Pradesh (list)	12 June 2024		N. Chandrababu Naidu; Naidu IV	TDP	135	12 June 2024	Pawan Kalyan (JSP)	JSP (21)	164/175	4 June 2024
1	Andhra Pradesh (list)	12 June 2024		N. Chandrababu Naidu; Naidu IV	TDP	135	12 June 2024	Pawan Kalyan (JSP)	BJP (8)	164/175	4 June 2024
2	Arunachal Pradesh (list)	16 September 2016		Pema Khandu; Khandu V	BJP	46	16 September 2016	Chowna Mein	None	46/60	4 June 2024
3	Assam (list)	19 May 2016		Himanta Biswa Sarma; Sarma I Sarma II	BJP	82	10 May 2021	Vacant	AGP (10)	102/126	4 May 2026
3	Assam (list)	19 May 2016		Himanta Biswa Sarma; Sarma I Sarma II	BJP	82	10 May 2021	Vacant	BPF (10)	102/126	4 May 2026
4	Bihar (list)	28 January 2024		Samrat Choudhary; Chaudhary	BJP	88	28 January 2024	Vijay Kumar Chaudhary; Bijendra Prasad Yadav (JDU)	JD(U) (85)	201/243	14 November 2025
4	Bihar (list)	28 January 2024		Samrat Choudhary; Chaudhary	BJP	88	28 January 2024	Vijay Kumar Chaudhary; Bijendra Prasad Yadav (JDU)	LJP(RV) (19)	201/243	14 November 2025
4	Bihar (list)	28 January 2024		Samrat Choudhary; Chaudhary	BJP	88	28 January 2024	Vijay Kumar Chaudhary; Bijendra Prasad Yadav (JDU)	HAM(S) (5)	201/243	14 November 2025
4	Bihar (list)	28 January 2024		Samrat Choudhary; Chaudhary	BJP	88	28 January 2024	Vijay Kumar Chaudhary; Bijendra Prasad Yadav (JDU)	RLM (4)	201/243	14 November 2025
5	Chhattisgarh (list)	13 December 2023		Vishnu Deo Sai; Sai	BJP	54	13 December 2023	Arun Sao; Vijay Sharma	None	54/90	3 December 2023
6	Delhi (list)	20 February 2025		Rekha Gupta; Gupta	BJP	48	20 February 2025	Vacant	None	48/70	05 February 2025
7	Goa (list)	6 March 2012		Pramod Sawant; Sawant II	BJP	27	19 March 2019	Vacant	MGP (2)	32/40	10 March 2022
7	Goa (list)	6 March 2012		Pramod Sawant; Sawant II	BJP	27	19 March 2019	Vacant	IND (3)	32/40	10 March 2022
8	Gujarat (list)	28 February 1998		Bhupendrabhai Patel; Patel II	BJP	162	13 September 2021	Harsh Sanghavi	IND (2)	164/182	8 December 2022
9	Haryana (list)	19 October 2014		Nayab Singh Saini; Saini II	BJP	48	12 March 2024	Vacant	IND (3)	51/90	8 October 2024
10	Madhya Pradesh (list)	23 March 2020		Mohan Yadav; Yadav	BJP	165	13 December 2023	Jagdish Devda; Rajendra Shukla	None	165/230	3 December 2023
11	Maharashtra (list)	30 June 2022		Devendra Fadnavis; Fadnavis III	BJP	132	5 December 2024	Eknath Shinde (SHS) Sunetra Pawar (NCP)	SHS (57)	237/288	23 November 2024
11	Maharashtra (list)	30 June 2022		Devendra Fadnavis; Fadnavis III	BJP	132	5 December 2024	Eknath Shinde (SHS) Sunetra Pawar (NCP)	NCP (41)	237/288	23 November 2024
11	Maharashtra (list)	30 June 2022		Devendra Fadnavis; Fadnavis III	BJP	132	5 December 2024	Eknath Shinde (SHS) Sunetra Pawar (NCP)	JSS (2)	237/288	23 November 2024
11	Maharashtra (list)	30 June 2022		Devendra Fadnavis; Fadnavis III	BJP	132	5 December 2024	Eknath Shinde (SHS) Sunetra Pawar (NCP)	RSPS (1)	237/288	23 November 2024
11	Maharashtra (list)	30 June 2022		Devendra Fadnavis; Fadnavis III	BJP	132	5 December 2024	Eknath Shinde (SHS) Sunetra Pawar (NCP)	RSVA (1)	237/288	23 November 2024
11	Maharashtra (list)	30 June 2022		Devendra Fadnavis; Fadnavis III	BJP	132	5 December 2024	Eknath Shinde (SHS) Sunetra Pawar (NCP)	RYSP (1)	237/288	23 November 2024
11	Maharashtra (list)	30 June 2022		Devendra Fadnavis; Fadnavis III	BJP	132	5 December 2024	Eknath Shinde (SHS) Sunetra Pawar (NCP)	IND (2)	237/288	23 November 2024
12	Manipur (list)	4 February 2026		Yumnam Khemchand Singh; Singh	BJP	37	4 February 2026	Nemcha Kipgen (BJP); Losii Dikho (NPF)	NPF (5)	52/60	10 March 2022
12	Manipur (list)	4 February 2026		Yumnam Khemchand Singh; Singh	BJP	37	4 February 2026	Nemcha Kipgen (BJP); Losii Dikho (NPF)	NPP (6)	52/60	10 March 2022
12	Manipur (list)	4 February 2026		Yumnam Khemchand Singh; Singh	BJP	37	4 February 2026	Nemcha Kipgen (BJP); Losii Dikho (NPF)	JD(U) (1)	52/60	10 March 2022
12	Manipur (list)	4 February 2026		Yumnam Khemchand Singh; Singh	BJP	37	4 February 2026	Nemcha Kipgen (BJP); Losii Dikho (NPF)	IND (3)	52/60	10 March 2022
13	Meghalaya (list)	6 March 2018		Conrad Sangma; Sangma II	NPP	33	6 March 2018	Prestone Tynsong Sniawbhalang Dhar (NPP)	UDP (12)	51/60	2 March 2023
13	Meghalaya (list)	6 March 2018		Conrad Sangma; Sangma II	NPP	33	6 March 2018	Prestone Tynsong Sniawbhalang Dhar (NPP)	BJP (2)	51/60	2 March 2023
13	Meghalaya (list)	6 March 2018		Conrad Sangma; Sangma II	NPP	33	6 March 2018	Prestone Tynsong Sniawbhalang Dhar (NPP)	HSPDP (2)	51/60	2 March 2023
13	Meghalaya (list)	6 March 2018		Conrad Sangma; Sangma II	NPP	33	6 March 2018	Prestone Tynsong Sniawbhalang Dhar (NPP)	IND (2)	51/60	2 March 2023
14	Nagaland (list)	8 March 2018		Neiphiu Rio; Rio V	NPF	34	8 March 2018	T.R. Zeliang (NPF) Yanthungo Patton (BJP)	BJP (12)	60/60	2 March 2023
14	Nagaland (list)	8 March 2018		Neiphiu Rio; Rio V	NPF	34	8 March 2018	T.R. Zeliang (NPF) Yanthungo Patton (BJP)	NPP (5)	60/60	2 March 2023
14	Nagaland (list)	8 March 2018		Neiphiu Rio; Rio V	NPF	34	8 March 2018	T.R. Zeliang (NPF) Yanthungo Patton (BJP)	RPI(A) (2)	60/60	2 March 2023
14	Nagaland (list)	8 March 2018		Neiphiu Rio; Rio V	NPF	34	8 March 2018	T.R. Zeliang (NPF) Yanthungo Patton (BJP)	LJP(RV) (2)	60/60	2 March 2023
14	Nagaland (list)	8 March 2018		Neiphiu Rio; Rio V	NPF	34	8 March 2018	T.R. Zeliang (NPF) Yanthungo Patton (BJP)	IND (5)	60/60	2 March 2023
15	Odisha (list)	12 June 2024		Mohan Charan Majhi; Majhi	BJP	79	12 June 2024	Kanak Vardhan Singh Deo Pravati Parida	IND (14)	93/147	4 June 2024
16	Puducherry (list)	7 May 2021		N. Rangaswamy; Rangaswamy V	AINRC	10	7 May 2021	Vacant	BJP (6)	18/30	2 May 2021
16	Puducherry (list)	7 May 2021		N. Rangaswamy; Rangaswamy V	AINRC	10	7 May 2021	Vacant	IND (2)	18/30	2 May 2021
17	Rajasthan (list)	15 December 2023		Bhajan Lal Sharma; Sharma	BJP	118	15 December 2023	Diya Kumari Prem Chand Bairwa	SHS (2)	127/200	3 December 2023
17	Rajasthan (list)	15 December 2023		Bhajan Lal Sharma; Sharma	BJP	118	15 December 2023	Diya Kumari Prem Chand Bairwa	RLD (1)	127/200	3 December 2023
17	Rajasthan (list)	15 December 2023		Bhajan Lal Sharma; Sharma	BJP	118	15 December 2023	Diya Kumari Prem Chand Bairwa	IND (6)	127/200	3 December 2023
18	Sikkim (list)	27 May 2019		Prem Singh Tamang; Tamang II	SKM	32	27 May 2019	Vacant	None	32/32	2 June 2024
19	Tripura (list)	9 March 2018		Manik Saha; Saha II	BJP	33	15 May 2022	Vacant	TMP (13)	47/60	2 March 2023
19	Tripura (list)	9 March 2018		Manik Saha; Saha II	BJP	33	15 May 2022	Vacant	IPFT (1)	47/60	2 March 2023
20	Uttar Pradesh (list)	17 March 2017		Yogi Adityanath; Yogi Adityanath II	BJP	258	17 March 2017	Keshav Prasad Maurya Brajesh Pathak	AD(S) (13)	291/403	10 March 2022
20	Uttar Pradesh (list)	17 March 2017		Yogi Adityanath; Yogi Adityanath II	BJP	258	17 March 2017	Keshav Prasad Maurya Brajesh Pathak	RLD (9)	291/403	10 March 2022
20	Uttar Pradesh (list)	17 March 2017		Yogi Adityanath; Yogi Adityanath II	BJP	258	17 March 2017	Keshav Prasad Maurya Brajesh Pathak	SBSP (6)	291/403	10 March 2022
20	Uttar Pradesh (list)	17 March 2017		Yogi Adityanath; Yogi Adityanath II	BJP	258	17 March 2017	Keshav Prasad Maurya Brajesh Pathak	NISHAD (5)	291/403	10 March 2022
20	Uttar Pradesh (list)	17 March 2017		Yogi Adityanath; Yogi Adityanath II	BJP	258	17 March 2017	Keshav Prasad Maurya Brajesh Pathak	IND (3)	291/403	10 March 2022
21	Uttarakhand (list)	18 March 2017		Pushkar Singh Dhami; Dhami II	BJP	47	3 July 2021	Vacant	None	47/70	10 March 2022
22	West Bengal (list)	9 May 2026		Suvendu Adhikari; Adhikari	BJP	208	9 May 2026	Vacant	None	209/294	23 & 29 April 2026

== Strength in legislative assemblies ==
The following is a list of the current number of Members of Legislative Assembly (MLAs) from the BJP as well as other political parties in the NDA in each of the 28 Indian states and 3 Union territories with legislative assemblies. The NDA currently holds a majority of the seats in 20 states and two Union territories, out of which the BJP on its own holds a majority of the seats in 16 states and one Union territory.

Source: Digital Sansad
State/UT	Total	BJP	NDA (Other)	Overall NDA Tally	CM from	Last Election
Andhra Pradesh	175	8	TDP (135)	164 / 175	TDP	2024
Andhra Pradesh	175	8	JSP (21)	164 / 175	TDP	2024
Arunachal Pradesh	60	46	PPA (6)	59 / 60	BJP	2024
Arunachal Pradesh	60	46	NCP (3)	59 / 60	BJP	2024
Arunachal Pradesh	60	46	NPP (1)	59 / 60	BJP	2024
Arunachal Pradesh	60	46	IND (3)	59 / 60	BJP	2024
Assam	126	82	AGP (10)	102 / 126	BJP	2026
Assam	126	82	BPF (10)	102 / 126	BJP	2026
Bihar	243	88	JD(U) (84)	200 / 243	BJP	2025
Bihar	243	88	LJP(RV) (19)	200 / 243	BJP	2025
Bihar	243	88	HAM(S) (5)	200 / 243	BJP	2025
Bihar	243	88	RLM (4)	200 / 243	BJP	2025
Chhattisgarh	90	53	None	53 / 90	BJP	2023
Delhi	70	48	None	48 / 70	BJP	2025
Goa	40	26	MGP (2)	31 / 40	BJP	2022
Goa	40	26	IND (3)	31 / 40	BJP	2022
Gujarat	182	162	IND (2)	164 / 182	BJP	2022
Haryana	90	48	IND (3)	51 / 90	BJP	2024
Himachal Pradesh	68	28	None	28 / 68	INC	2022
Jammu and Kashmir	90	29	None	29 / 90	JKNC	2024
Jharkhand	81	21	AJSU (1)	24 / 81	JMM	2024
Jharkhand	81	21	JD(U) (1)	24 / 81	JMM	2024
Jharkhand	81	21	LJP(RV) (1)	24 / 81	JMM	2024
Karnataka	224	63	JD(S) (18)	81 / 224	INC	2023
Kerala	140	3	None	3 / 140	INC	2026
Madhya Pradesh	230	165	None	165 / 230	BJP	2023
Maharashtra	288	132	SHS (57)	237 / 288	BJP	2024
Maharashtra	288	132	NCP (41)	237 / 288	BJP	2024
Maharashtra	288	132	JSS (2)	237 / 288	BJP	2024
Maharashtra	288	132	RSPS (1)	237 / 288	BJP	2024
Maharashtra	288	132	RSVA (1)	237 / 288	BJP	2024
Maharashtra	288	132	RYSP (1)	237 / 288	BJP	2024
Maharashtra	288	132	IND (2)	237 / 288	BJP	2024
Manipur	60	36	NPP (6)	51 / 60	BJP	2022
Manipur	60	36	NPF (5)	51 / 60	BJP	2022
Manipur	60	36	JD(U) (1)	51 / 60	BJP	2022
Manipur	60	36	IND (3)	51 / 60	BJP	2022
Meghalaya	60	10	NPP (36)	50 / 60	NPP	2023
Meghalaya	60	10	HSPDP (2)	50 / 60	NPP	2023
Meghalaya	60	10	IND (2)	50 / 60	NPP	2023
Mizoram	40	2	None	2 / 40	ZPM	2023
Nagaland	60	12	NPF (39)	60 / 60	NPF	2023
Nagaland	60	12	RPI(A) (2)	60 / 60	NPF	2023
Nagaland	60	12	LJP(RV) (2)	60 / 60	NPF	2023
Nagaland	60	12	IND (5)	60 / 60	NPF	2023
Odisha	147	79	IND (3)	82 / 147	BJP	2024
Puducherry	33	4	AINRC (12)	18 / 33	AINRC	2026
Puducherry	33	4	AIADMK (1)	18 / 33	AINRC	2026
Puducherry	33	4	LJK (1)	18 / 33	AINRC	2026
Puducherry	33	4	IND (1)	18 / 33	AINRC	2026
Punjab	117	2	None	2 / 117	AAP	2022
Rajasthan	200	117	SHS (2)	126 / 200	BJP	2023
Rajasthan	200	117	RLD (1)	126 / 200	BJP	2023
Rajasthan	200	117	IND (6)	126 / 200	BJP	2023
Sikkim	32	0	SKM (32)	32 / 32	SKM	2024
Tamil Nadu	234	1	AIADMK (41)	46 / 234	TVK	2026
Tamil Nadu	234	1	PMK (4)	46 / 234	TVK	2026
Telangana	119	8	None	8 / 119	INC	2023
Tripura	60	33	TMP (13)	46 / 60	BJP	2023
Tripura	60	33	IPFT (1)	46 / 60	BJP	2023
Uttar Pradesh	403	256	AD(S) (13)	292 / 403	BJP	2022
Uttar Pradesh	403	256	RLD (9)	292 / 403	BJP	2022
Uttar Pradesh	403	256	SBSP (6)	292 / 403	BJP	2022
Uttar Pradesh	403	256	NISHAD (5)	292 / 403	BJP	2022
Uttar Pradesh	403	256	IND (3)	292 / 403	BJP	2022
Uttarakhand	70	47	None	47 / 70	BJP	2022
West Bengal	294	209	None	209 / 294	BJP	2026
Total	4,126	1,818	692	2,510 / 4,126	NDA (22)	

== List of presidents ==
Note that it refers to nomination by alliance, as the offices of President are apolitical.

=== Presidents ===
No.	Portrait	Name (birth–death)	Term of office Electoral mandates Time in office		Previous post	Vice president	Party
11		A. P. J. Abdul Kalam (1931–2015)	25 July 2002	25 July 2007	Principal Scientific Adviser to the Government of India	Krishan Kant (2002) Bhairon Singh Shekhawat (2002–2007)	Independent
11		A. P. J. Abdul Kalam (1931–2015)	2002		Principal Scientific Adviser to the Government of India	Krishan Kant (2002) Bhairon Singh Shekhawat (2002–2007)	Independent
11		A. P. J. Abdul Kalam (1931–2015)	5 years		Principal Scientific Adviser to the Government of India	Krishan Kant (2002) Bhairon Singh Shekhawat (2002–2007)	Independent
11		A. P. J. Abdul Kalam (1931–2015)	Kalam was an educator and engineer who played a leading role in the development of India's ballistic missile and nuclear weapons programs. He also received the Bharat Ratna. He was popularly known as "People's President".				
14		Ram Nath Kovind (b.1945)	25 July 2017	25 July 2022	Governor of Bihar	Mohammad Hamid Ansari (2017) Venkaiah Naidu (2017–2022)	Bharatiya Janata Party
14		Ram Nath Kovind (b.1945)	2017		Governor of Bihar	Mohammad Hamid Ansari (2017) Venkaiah Naidu (2017–2022)	Bharatiya Janata Party
14		Ram Nath Kovind (b.1945)	5 years		Governor of Bihar	Mohammad Hamid Ansari (2017) Venkaiah Naidu (2017–2022)	Bharatiya Janata Party
14		Ram Nath Kovind (b.1945)	Kovind was governor of Bihar from 2015 to 2017 and a Member of Parliament from 1994 to 2006. He is the second Dalit president (after K. R. Narayanan) and is the first president from the Bharatiya Janata Party (BJP) and is an active member of Rashtriya Swayamsevak Sangh (RSS) since his youth.				
15		Droupadi Murmu (b.1958)	25 July 2022	Incumbent	Governor of Jharkhand	Venkaiah Naidu (2022) Jagdeep Dhankhar (2022–2025) C. P. Radhakrishnan(2025-)	Bharatiya Janata Party
15		Droupadi Murmu (b.1958)	2022		Governor of Jharkhand	Venkaiah Naidu (2022) Jagdeep Dhankhar (2022–2025) C. P. Radhakrishnan(2025-)	Bharatiya Janata Party
15		Droupadi Murmu (b.1958)	4 years, 108 days		Governor of Jharkhand	Venkaiah Naidu (2022) Jagdeep Dhankhar (2022–2025) C. P. Radhakrishnan(2025-)	Bharatiya Janata Party
15		Droupadi Murmu (b.1958)	Murmu was governor of Jharkhand from 2015 to 2021 and the Member of the Odisha Legislative Assembly from 2000 to 2009. She held several ministerial portfolios in Government of Odisha. She is the first Tribal and second female President of India and is the second president from the Bharatiya Janata Party.				

== List of vice presidents ==
#	Portrait	Name (birth–death)	Elected (% votes)	From	To	Time in office	President	Party
11	Bhairon Singh Shekhawat	Bhairon Singh Shekhawat (1923–2010)	2002 (59.82%)	19 August 2002	21 July 2007 (Note: Resigned)	4 years, 336 days	A. P. J. Abdul Kalam	Bharatiya Janata Party
13	Venkaiah Naidu	Venkaiah Naidu (b. 1949)	2017 (67.89%)	11 August 2017	11 August 2022	5 years	Ram Nath Kovind	Bharatiya Janata Party
14	Jagdeep Dhankhar	Jagdeep Dhankhar (b. 1951)	2022 (74.5%)	11 August 2022	21 July 2025 (Note: Resigned citing health concerns)	2 years, 344 days	Droupadi Murmu	Bharatiya Janata Party
15	C. P. Radhakrishnan	C. P. Radhakrishnan (b. 1957)	2025 (60.10%)	12 September 2025	Incumbent	1 year, 59 days	Droupadi Murmu	Bharatiya Janata Party

Note that it refers to nomination by alliance, as the offices of Vice President are apolitical.

== List of prime ministers ==
#	Portrait	Name (born – died)	From	To	Time in office	Lok Sabha	Ministry	Constituency	Party
1		Atal Bihari Vajpayee (1924 – 2018)	(Note: that time, alliance weren't formed)16 May 1996	1 June 1996 (Note: Resigned)	6 years, 80 days	11th	Vajpayee l	Lucknow	Bharatiya Janata Party
1		Atal Bihari Vajpayee (1924 – 2018)	19 March 1998	13 October 1999	6 years, 80 days	12th	Vajpayee II	Lucknow	Bharatiya Janata Party
1		Atal Bihari Vajpayee (1924 – 2018)	13 October 1999	22 May 2004	6 years, 80 days	13th	Vajpayee III	Lucknow	Bharatiya Janata Party
2		Narendra Modi (born 1950)	26 May 2014	30 May 2019	12 years, 168 days	16th	Modi I	Varanasi	Bharatiya Janata Party
2		Narendra Modi (born 1950)	30 May 2019	9 June 2024	12 years, 168 days	17th	Modi II	Varanasi	Bharatiya Janata Party
2		Narendra Modi (born 1950)	9 June 2024	Incumbent	12 years, 168 days	18th	Modi III	Varanasi	Bharatiya Janata Party

=== List of deputy prime ministers ===
No.	Deputy Prime minister	Portrait	Term in office			Lok Sabha	Prime Minister	Constituency
No.	Deputy Prime minister	Portrait	Start	End	Tenure	Lok Sabha	Prime Minister	Constituency
1	L. K. Advani		29 June 2002	22 May 2004	1 year, 328 days	13th	Atal Bihari Vajpayee	Gandhinagar

== List of current chairpersons (with their deputies) and speakers (with their deputies) ==
=== Rajya Sabha ===
House	Chairperson (Note: Vice President of India is the ex-officio Chairperson of the Rajya Sabha.)	Party	Deputy Chairperson	Party
Rajya Sabha	C. P. Radhakrishnan	BJP	Harivansh	NOM

=== Lok Sabha ===
House	Speaker	Party	Deputy Speaker	Party
Lok Sabha	Om Birla	BJP	Vacant	N/A

=== State Legislative Councils ===
This is the list of current Chairpersons and Deputy Chairpersons of the legislative councils of the Indian states:

State	Chairperson	Party	Deputy Chairperson	Party
Bihar	Awadhesh Narain Singh	BJP	Ram Bachan Rai	JD(U)
Maharashtra	Ram Shinde	BJP	Sachin Ahir	SS
Uttar Pradesh	Kunwar Manvendra Singh	BJP	Vacant	N/A

=== Legislative Assemblies ===
This is the list of current Speakers and Deputy Speakers of the legislative assemblies of the Indian states and union territories:

States	Speaker	Party	Deputy Speaker	Party
Andhra Pradesh	Chintakayala Ayyanna Patrudu	TDP	Raghu Rama Krishna Raju	TDP
Arunachal Pradesh	Tesam Pongte	BJP	Kardo Nyigyor	BJP
Assam	Ranjeet Kumar Dass	BJP	Habbey Teron	BJP
Bihar	Prem Kumar	BJP	Narendra Narayan Yadav	JD(U)
Chhattisgarh	Raman Singh	BJP	Vacant	N/A
Goa	Ganesh Gaonkar	BJP	Joshua D'Souza	BJP
Gujarat	Shankar Chaudhary	BJP	Purnesh Modi	BJP
Haryana	Harvinder Kalyan	BJP	Krishan Lal Middha	BJP
Madhya Pradesh	Narendra Singh Tomar	BJP	Vacant	N/A
Maharashtra	Rahul Narwekar	BJP	Anna Bansode	NCP
Manipur	Thokchom Satyabrata Singh	BJP	Kongkham Robindro Singh	BJP
Meghalaya	Thomas A. Sangma	NPP	Limison D. Sangma	NPP
Nagaland	Sharingain Longkümer	NPF	S. Toiho Yeptho	NPF
Odisha	Surama Padhy	BJP	Bhabani Shankar Bhoi	BJP
Rajasthan	Vasudev Devnani	BJP	Vacant	N/A
Sikkim	Mingma Narbu Sherpa	SKM	Raj Kumari Thapa	SKM
Tripura	Ram Pada Jamatia	BJP	Ram Prasad Paul	BJP
Uttarakhand	Ritu Khanduri Bhushan	BJP	Vacant	N/A
Uttar Pradesh	Satish Mahana	BJP	Vacant	N/A
West Bengal	Rathindra Bose	BJP	Vacant	N/A

Union Territories	Speaker	Party	Deputy Speaker	Party
Delhi	Vijendra Gupta	BJP	Mohan Singh Bisht	BJP
Puducherry	Vacant	N/A	Vacant	N/A

== List of opposition leaders ==
=== State Legislative Councils ===
This is the list of current opposition leaders in the legislative councils of the Indian states:

State	Portrait	Name	Party
Karnataka		Chalavadi Narayanaswamy	Bharatiya Janata Party

=== State Legislative Assemblies ===
This is the list of current opposition leaders in the legislative assemblies of the Indian states and union territories:

State/UT	Portrait	Name	Party
Himachal Pradesh		Jai Ram Thakur	Bharatiya Janata Party
Jammu and Kashmir		Sunil Kumar Sharma	Bharatiya Janata Party
Jharkhand		Babulal Marandi	Bharatiya Janata Party
Karnataka		R. Ashoka	Bharatiya Janata Party

== Member parties ==
As of March 2025, there are 39 political parties that are members of the alliance. The Bharatiya Janata Party and the National People's Party are the only two political parties being recognised by the Election Commission of India as national parties. Other parties in the alliance are either recognised as state level parties or unrecognised parties.

== Candidates in elections ==
=== Lok Sabha general elections ===
List of National Democratic Alliance candidates in the 1998 Indian general election
List of National Democratic Alliance candidates in the 1999 Indian general election
List of National Democratic Alliance candidates in the 2004 Indian general election
List of National Democratic Alliance candidates in the 2009 Indian general election
List of National Democratic Alliance candidates in the 2014 Indian general election
List of National Democratic Alliance candidates in the 2019 Indian general election
List of National Democratic Alliance candidates in the 2024 Indian general election

== Electoral performance ==
Election	Seats won	Change	Total votes	Share of votes	Swing	Status	NDA Leader
1998	265 / 543	New	150,679,142	40.90%	New	Government	Atal Bihari Vajpayee
1999	302 / 543	▲37	149,823,824	41.12%	▲3.84%	Government	Atal Bihari Vajpayee
2004	188 / 543	▼114	141,623,671	36.34%	▼2.52%	Opposition	Atal Bihari Vajpayee
2009	158 / 543	▼30	101,361,535	24.30%	▼4.94%	Opposition	L. K. Advani
2014	336 / 543	▲178	211,784,403	38.66%	▲12.00%	Government	Narendra Modi
2019	353 / 543	▲17	272,836,794	44.90%	▲10.28%	Government	Narendra Modi
2024	293 / 543	▼60	312,010,926	44.29%	▼0.61%	Government	Narendra Modi

All time-NDA Lok Sabha seat count

== Electoral performances since 2024 ==
Since the 2024 Indian general election, 11 states and union territories have held their assembly elections. NDA has formed the government for 7 of those elections, including a return to power in Delhi and forming the government in West Bengal for the first time.

Election	Year	Seats won	Change	Total votes	Share of votes	Swing	Status	Leadership
Haryana	2024	48 / 90	▲8	5,548,800	39.94%	▲3.45%	Government	Nayab Singh Saini
Jammu and Kashmir	2024	29 / 90	▲4	14,62,225	25.63%	New	Opposition	Ravinder Raina
Maharashtra	2024	235 / 288	▲49	31,849,405	49.30%	▲7.14%	Government	Devendra Fadnavis, Ajit Pawar, Eknath Shinde
Jharkhand	2024	24 / 81	▼3	6,807,719	38.14%	▼4.68%	Opposition	Babulal Marandi
Delhi	2025	48 / 70	▲40	4,473,899	47.15%	▲8.64%	Government	Rekha Gupta
Bihar	2025	202 / 243	▲81	23,383,298	46.56%	▲9.30%	Government	Nitish Kumar
Assam	2026	102 / 126	▲27	1,04,03,165	48.01%	▲3.61%	Government	Himanta Biswa Sarma
Kerala	2026	3 / 140	▲3	30,66,385	14.20%	▲1.79%	Others	Rajeev Chandrasekhar
Puducherry	2026	18 / 30	▲2	335,177	38.7%	▼5.5%	Government	N. Rangaswamy
Tamil Nadu	2026	53 / 234	▼22	13,425,260	27.21%	▼14.85%	Others	Edappadi K. Palaniswami
West Bengal	2026	208 / 294	▲130	29,224,804	45.92%	▲7.95%	Government	Suvendu Adhikari

NDA retained in Haryana, Maharashtra, Bihar, Assam and Puducherry. It became opposition in Jammu & Kashmir and Jharkhand. It neither become in power nor in opposition in Kerala and Tamil Nadu. It returned to power in Delhi and formed the government formed the government formed the first time in West Bengal.

== Timeline ==
=== 1998 ===
- The Telugu Desam Party (TDP) extended outside support to the NDA, allowing Atal Bihari Vajpayee to become the first BJP Prime Minister.

=== 1999 ===
- The All India Anna Dravida Munnetra Kazhagam leader J. Jayalalithaa on 14 April 1998 withdrew from the NDA, leading to the collapse of the First Vajpayee ministry.

=== 2004 ===
- TDP withdrew from the NDA.

=== 2009 ===
- The Telangana Rashtra Samithi in United Andhra Pradesh, joined the NDA on 10 May 2009 and subsequently denied the fact that it joined NDA and clarified that they only extended the support.
- Indian National Lok Dal in Haryana, joined the NDA on 19 September 2009, but later withdrawed it.

=== 2011 ===
- Kuldeep Bishnoi led Haryana Janhit Congress (BL) Joined NDA.
- Ramdas Athawale led Republican Party of India (A) Joined NDA.
- Ajit Singh led Rashtriya Lok Dal withdrawn from the NDA.

=== 2012 ===
Presidential election

- NDA nominated P. A. Sangma as its presidential candidate who lost against UPA's Pranab Mukherjee.

Vice-Presidential election

- Jaswant Singh was named as the candidate for the post of Vice-President against UPA's Hamid Ansari. Ansari won his second term in office.

=== 2013 ===
- On 16 June 2013, Nitish Kumar led Janta Dal United has withdrawn from NDA.
- On 13 September 2013, Narendra Modi declared as PM candidate for 2014 Elections.

=== 2014 ===
- On 1 January 2014, Marumalarchi Dravida Munnetra Kazhhagam leader Vaiko has announced that MDMK formally joined back to NDA.
- The two small parties viz Kongunadu Munnetra Kazhagam and Indhiya Jananayaga Katchi have also joined NDA.
- The BJP would like two more southern parties such as Desiya Murpokku Dravida Kazhagam, Pattali Makkal Katchi to also join the alliance.
- In Maharashtra, two regional political outfits, Swabhimani Paksha and Rashtriya Samaj Paksha, joined NDA in January.
- The coalition of five parties is termed as Mahāyuti (Marathi: महायुति, lit. 'Grand Alliance'). So in Maharashtra now NDA alliance consist of 5 Parties viz BJP, Shiv Sena, Republican Party of India, Swabhimani Paksha and Rashtriya Samaj Paksha.
- On 23 February 2014, Rashtriya Lok Samata Party led by Upendra Kushwaha joined NDA and will be contesting at 3 Lok Sabha seats in Bihar.
- On 27 February 2014 Lok Janshakti Party led by Ram Vilas Paswan re-joined NDA. It would contest 7 Lok Sabha seats in Bihar during 2014 elections.
- DMDK will be fighting Lok Sabha Election through an alliance with BJP led NDA.
- Pattali Makkal Katchi led Social Democratic Alliance are the other allies of NDA in Tamil Nadu.
- Maharashtra Navnirman Sena : Its President, Raj Thackeray announced external support to NDA on 9 March 2014 which is marked as Party's formation day, supporting Narendra Modi as Prime Ministerial Candidate.
- Indian National Lok Dal : Its Gen. Sec., Sh. Ajay Singh Chautala announced external support to NDA, supporting Sh. Narendra Modi as Prime Ministerial Candidate.
- Lok Satta Party : President Shri J P Narayan announced external support to NDA, supporting Sh. Narendra Modi as Prime Ministerial Candidate
- All India NR Congress (AINRC) formally joined NDA on 13 March 2014 and will be contesting in Puducherry.
- On 6 April 2014, Telugu Desam Party rejoined the NDA after breaking the alliance in 2004 following the general election defeat.
- Shiv Sena Though Shiv Sena has quit Mahayuti in Maharashtra, before Maharashtra Legislative Assembly Elections 2014, but has decided to remain with NDA at the centre.
- All Jharkhand Students Union clinched an alliance with BJP for Jharkhand Assembly elections under which its junior partner will contest eight of the 81 seats in the state.

=== 2015 ===
- Bharatiya Janata Party on 27 February 2015 clinched an alliance with People's Democratic Party for Government Formation in Jammu and Kashmir under which its CM will be from PDP.
- In the month of November, BJP alliance lost the legislative assembly election in Bihar to the Mahagathbandhan comprising JD(U), RJD and the INC.

=== 2016 ===
- In January 2016, Bharatiya Janata Party clinched an alliance with Bodoland People's Front in Assam.
- In March 2016, after a meeting with AGP President Atul Bora and former Chief Minister Prafulla Kumar Mahanta, BJP formed an alliance with Asom Gana Parishad for upcoming Assam legislative assembly election 2016.
- BJP also aligned with Rabha and Tiwa Tribe outfit Rabha Jatiya Aikya Manch and Tiwa Jatiya Aikya Manch.
- In March 2016, BJP forged an alliance with Kerala-based Ezhava outfit Bharath Dharma Jana Sena Party for Kerala Elections 2016.
- Following BJP's victory in the Assam Legislative Assembly Elections 2016, the party formed an alliance of like-minded non-Congress parties in the Northeast, called the North-East Democratic Alliance, consisting of 11 regional parties of Northeast India.
- Himanta Biswa Sarma, BJP leader from Assam has been appointed Convener of the regional alliance.
- On 21 December 2016, Khandu was suspended from the party by the party president and Takam Pario was named as the next likely Chief Minister of Arunachal Pradesh replacing Khandu after People's Party of Arunachal suspended Khandu along with 6 other MLAs.
- In December 2016, Khandu proved majority on the floor of the legislative assembly with 33 of the People's Party of Arunachal's 43 legislators joining the Bharatiya Janata Party as the BJP increased its strength to 45 and had the support of two independents. He became second Chief Minister of Arunachal Pradesh of Bharatiya Janata Party in Arunachal Pradesh after the 44 days lead Gegong Apang government in 2003.

=== 2017 ===
- In January 2017, Bharatiya Janata Party's alliance partner Maharashtrawadi Gomantak Party in Goa and Shiv Sena in Maharashtra came together to contest Goa Legislative Assembly election in 2017 against the BJP with another Sangh Pariwar group called Goa Suraksha Manch.
- The results of the 2017 Goa Assembly election gave rise to a hung assembly since no political party could achieve a complete majority of 21 in the 40 member Goa Legislative Assembly.
- The Indian National Congress emerged the largest party with 17 seats but ultimately, the Bharatiya Janata Party which emerged victorious in 13 constituencies formed the government with the support of the Goa Forward Party, Maharashtrawadi Gomantak Party and independents.
- The Goa Forward Party expressed its support to the Bharatiya Janata Party on the condition that the then Union Defence Minister of India Manohar Parrikar would return to Goa as the Chief Minister of Goa.
- On 15 March 2017, N. Biren Singh was sworn as the Chief Minister by having coalition with NPP, NPF, LJP and others, the first time that BJP formed a government in Manipur, though the INC emerged as the single largest party.
- On 27 July 2017, Janata Dal (United) rejoined NDA and formed a coalition government with Bharatiya Janata Party (BJP) in Bihar with Nitish Kumar as the Chief Minister and Sushil Kumar Modi as the Deputy Chief Minister, and with that BJP completed its domination in Hindi belt.

=== 2018 ===
- On 9 March 2018, Biplab Kumar Deb was sworn as the Chief Minister having a pre-poll alliance with IPFT, the first time that BJP formed a government in Tripura.
- On 16 March 2018, Telugu Desam Party withdrew from the NDA citing the BJP's failure to fulfill the promises made in the State Reorganisation Act and to grant special status to Andhra Pradesh.
- Rashtriya Lok Samata Party (RLSP) withdrew from the NDA on 10 December 2018, citing a lack of progress on development in Bihar.
- In December 2018's state elections, the NDA lost elections in Madhya Pradesh, Rajasthan, and Chhattisgarh to the INC. In Chhattisgarh, BJP was defeated by the INC with 3/4th majority. It was also defeated by the TRS in Telangana and BJP managed to win only 1 seat out of the 119 constituencies in Telangana

=== 2019 ===
- On 7 January 2019, the AGP withdrew from the NDA and also from the Assam Government on the issue of citizenship amendment bill.
- On 21 January 2019, the GJM withdrew from the NDA and extended the support to Mamata Banerjee .
- On 19 February 2019, AIADMK and PMK rejoined NDA and BJP announced that "They will contest 5 Lok sabha seats in Tamil Nadu".
- On 19 February 2019, Pattali Makkal Katchi rejoined NDA
- BJP announced that "They will contest 5 Lok sabha seats in Tamil Nadu".
- On 10 March 2019, DMDK rejoined NDA.
- On 8 March 2019 in Sikkim, BJP joined hands with opposition party SKM
- On 12 March 2019 in Assam, BJP joined hands with old ally AGP
- On 12 March 2019 in Maharashtra, Rayat Kranti Sanghatana is a part of NDA
- On 25 March 2019 in Tamil Nadu, Puthiya Needhi Katchi is a part of Alliance
- On 4 April 2019 in Rajasthan, BJP joined hands with the RLP
- On 5 April 2019 in Uttar Pradesh, Nishad Party joined hands with NDA
- On 23 May 2019 NDA won the 2019 Indian General election with record breaking 352 seats with its allys
- In May 2019, NDA lost state elections of Andhra Pradesh & Odisha
- In May 2019, NDA won the state elections of Arunachal Pradesh & Sikkim.
- On 25 October 2019 in Haryana, JJP joined hands with NDA to forming a stable government at Haryana with BJP
- On 11 November 2019 in Maharashtra, Shiv Sena exited from the NDA, as BJP was not willing to agree for Sharing CM Post with Shiv Sena to form government in Maharashtra.
- In November 2019, NDA won the state election of Haryana
- In November 2019, NDA lost the state election of Maharashtra
- On 15 November 2019 in Jharkhand, BJP, AJSU sever ties in Jharkhand days before Assembly elections 2019.
- On 23 November 2019 in Maharashtra, NCP (Ajit Pawar Faction) joined NDA, Ajit Pawar took oath as Maharashtra's Deputy Chief Minister.
- On 26 November 2019 in Maharashtra, Ajit Pawar resigns as Maharashtra's Deputy Chief Minister. With immediate effect Devendra Fadnvis also resigns from the post of CM of Maharashtra. His term becomes the shortest term as Maharashtra's Chief Minister.
- In December 2019, NDA lost the state election of Jharkhand.

=== 2020 ===
- On 16 January 2020 Jana Sena of Pawan Kalyan announced that tying up with Bharatiya Janata Party in Andhra Pradesh, this decision came after Chief minister Y. S. Jagan Mohan Reddy's intention to decentralise the capital, instead of developing Amaravati.
- Jharkhand Vikas Morcha (Prajatantrik) led by Babulal Marandi merged with the Bharatiya Janata Party on 17 February 2020, at Jagannathpur Maidan, Ranchi in presence of Union Home Minister Amit Shah, BJP president Jagat Prakash Nadda and former Chief Ministers of Jharkhand Arjun Munda and Raghubar Das. Earlier, Marandi expelled MLAs Pradeep Yadav and Bandhu Tirkey from the party for "anti-party activities". Both of them later joined Indian National Congress in its Delhi headquarters.
- In February 2020, NDA lost the state election of Delhi
- In August 2020, Hindustani Awam Morcha re-joined NDA & granted 7 seats to contest in 2020 Bihar Legislative Assembly election.
- Shiromani Akali Dal announced leaving NDA in September 2020.
- In October 2020, the Vikassheel Insaan Party which had left the Mahagathbandhan (Bihar) joined the National Democratic Alliance and was granted 11 seats to contest.
- In October 2020, The All Jharkhand Students Union re-joined NDA.
- In October 2020, Gorkha Janmukti Morcha broke the alliance ahead of 2021 West Bengal Legislative Assembly election and allied with All India Trinamool Congress.
- In October 2020, Kerala Congress (Thomas) broke the alliance ahead of 2021 Kerala Legislative Assembly election and allied with United Democratic Front.
- In November 2020, BJP had the alliance with Bodoland People's Front ahead of 2020 Bodoland Territorial Council election.
- In November 2020, NDA won the state election of Bihar.
- In December 2020, United People's Party Liberal and Gana Suraksha Party joined the NDA and NEDA as alliance to Executive Committee in Bodoland Territorial Council.
- In December 2020, Rashtriya Loktantrik Party broken the alliance on the issue of 3 agriculture reforms laws.

=== 2021 ===
- In March 2021, Kerala Congress (Thomas) Has Withdrawn alliance ahead of 2021 Kerala Legislative Assembly election And Joined United Democratic Front.
- In March 2021, Desiya Murpokku Dravida Kazhagam broken the alliance for not issuing demanded number of constituency in the 2021 Tamil Nadu Legislative Assembly election.
- In April 2021, Goa Forward Party withdrew from the NDA for a variety of reasons, ranging from environmental issues to BJP apathy towards unemployment.
- In May 2021, NDA lost state elections of Tamil Nadu, Kerala, West Bengal
- In May 2021, NDA won state elections of Assam & Puducherry.
- In May 2021, Sukhdev Singh Dhindsa led Shiromani Akali Dal (Sanyukt) joined NDA.
- In December 2021, Captain Amrinder Singh led Punjab Lok Congress joined NDA.

=== 2022 ===
- In January 2022, Simarjit Singh Bains led Lok Insaaf Party joined NDA.
- In January 2022, Simarjit Singh Bains led Lok Insaaf Party broken the alliance for not issuing demanded number of constituency in the 2022 Punjab Legislative Assembly election.
- Bodoland People's Front rejoined NDA.
- NDA won the state elections of Uttar Pradesh, Goa, Uttarakhand & Manipur.
- NDA lost the state elections of Punjab.
- In June 2022 Shivsena leader Eknath Shinde along with rebel MLAs joined NDA and formed a government on 30 June 2022 with Shinde as Chief Minister of Maharashtra and BJP leader Devendra Fadnavis as Deputy Chief Minister of Maharashtra .
- After Goa Assembly elections 2022 Maharashtrawadi Gomantak Party extended support to NDA.
- On 9 August 2022, Nitish Kumar led Janata Dal (United) has withdrawn from NDA.
- On 19 September, Capt. Amrinder Singh led Punjab Lok Congress merged with BJP
- NDA won state elections of Gujarat.
- NDA lost the state elections of Himachal Pradesh.

=== 2023 ===
- In February, BJP broke alliance with National People's Party to contest all seats in 2023 Meghalaya Legislative Assembly election
- NDA won state elections in Tripura, Meghalaya and Nagaland.
- NDA lost state election in Karnataka.
- In June 2023 Hindustani Awam Morcha Joined NDA
- In July 2023 MLAs from NCP led by Ajit Pawar joined NDA and Ajit Pawar took oath as the Deputy Chief Minister of Maharashtra
- In July 2023 Suheldev Bharatiya Samaj Party Joined NDA
- In September 2023, Janata Dal (Secular) joined NDA
- On 25 September 2023, AIADMK left the NDA alliance.
- In December 2023, NDA made a record breaking victory in the decisive states of Chhattisgarh, Madhya Pradesh and Rajasthan, routing the incumbent Congress. The NDA lost in Telangana.

=== 2024 ===
- On 28 January 2024, Nitish Kumar led Janata Dal (United) rejoined NDA by quitting Mahagathbandhan and I.N.D.I.A. Alliance. It formed a coalition government with Bharatiya Janata Party (BJP) in Bihar with Nitish Kumar as the Chief Minister and two Deputy Chief Ministers from BJP.
- On 8 February 2024, Nationalist Congress Party officially enters the alliance after Election Commission of India recognitions it to be the legitimate party over the Sharad Pawar led faction.
- On 9 February 2024, Rashtriya Lok Dal led by Jayant Singh entered the alliance after securing deal of two Lok Sabha seats in Uttar Pradesh with BJP.
- On 7 March 2024, Tipra Motha Party joined NDA and two ministers sworn in Tripura Government.
- On 9 March 2024, TDP rejoined the NDA, forming a three-party coalition colloquially referred to in Telugu as Kūṭami (Telugu: కూటమి, lit. 'Alliance') comprising the BJP, Janasena Party and Telugu Desam Party. As part of the arrangement, the TDP and Janasena contested 17 and 2 seats, respectively in the general elections, and 144 and 21 seats, respectively in the Andhra Pradesh state legislative assembly elections.
- On 4 June, NDA made a record breaking victory in the 2024 Indian general election as the alliance recorded its third consecutive victory. NDA also made a record breaking victory in the decisive states of Andhra Pradesh, Arunachal Pradesh, Sikkim and Odisha, where it defeated the incumbent BJD government, which was in power for the last 24 years.
- In October 2024, NDA made a record breaking victory in the decisive state of Haryana, routing the Congress. The NDA lost in Jammu and Kashmir, though it managed to increase its seats and garner the most votes. It did particularly well in Jammu region.
- In November 2024, NDA made a record breaking landslide victory in the decisive state of Maharashtra, routing the Congress led alliance. The NDA lost in Jharkhand.

=== 2025 ===
- In February 2025, BJP wins election of NCT Delhi assembly and comes to power after 27 years.
- On 11 April 2025, AIADMK General Secretary Edappadi K. Palaniswami and BJP leader and Home Minister Amit Shah announced their alliance for 2026 Tamil Nadu Assembly election on a Joint Press Conference at Chennai; thus AIADMK rejoining NDA.
- In November 2025, NDA made a record breaking landslide victory in the decisive state of Bihar, routing the RJD led alliance. The BJP, for the first time won the most seats in Bihar.

=== 2026 ===
- In May 2026, BJP makes a landslide victory in West Bengal, winning more than two-thirds of the assembly and forming government in the state for the first time. NDA also retains Assam and Puducherry by a decisive mandate. NDA records its best performance in Kerala. NDA loses in Tamil Nadu.
- On 10 June 2026, Narendra Modi became the longest - serving elected PM of India surpassing the 62- year old unbroken record made by Jawaharlal Nehru.
- After the results of the 2026 elections in India, 20 MPs of the Trinamool Congress merged into the Nationalist Citizens Party of India and pledged their support to the NDA. Similarly, 6 MPs from Shiv Sena (UBT) migrated to the Shiv Sena. These mergers boosted the NDA Lok Sabha tally to 318, a substantial increase that marked the first political storm since the 2024 Indian general election.

== See also ==
- North-East Democratic Alliance
- United Progressive Alliance, now defunct
- Indian National Developmental Inclusive Alliance
