= Jomde Kena =

Indian politician (1967–2017)

Deputy Speaker of the Arunachal Pradesh Legislative Assembly
- In office 2009–2014
- Succeeded by: Tenzing Norbu Thongdok

Member of the Arunachal Pradesh Legislative Assembly
- In office 2004–2017
- Constituency: 28 Likabali

Personal details
- Born: 31 December 1967 Taramori, Gensi, Lower Siang district, Arunachal Pradesh
- Died: 4 September 2017 (aged 49) Guwahati, Assam
- Party: Bharatiya Janata Party
- Children: 6
- Occupation: Politician

Jomde Kena (Taramori, Gensi, 31 December 1967 – Guwahati, Assam, 4 September 2017) was a Bharatiya Janata Party politician from Arunachal Pradesh.

In 2014, he was elected from the Likabali constituency in Lower Siang district in Arunachal Pradesh Legislative Assembly on the Indian National Congress ticket. He later switched parties, first to the People's Party of Arunachal then to the Bharatiya Janata Party.

He also served as Deputy Speaker of Arunachal Pradesh Legislative Assembly from 2009 to 2014 and held the post of Transport Minister from 2014 to 2016.

He was Health and Family Welfare Minister in the Pema Khandu ministry.

== Death ==
Kena died on 4 September 2017 in a private hospital at Guwahati after prolonged illness. He is survived by his wife, four daughters and two sons.
