= 2017 elections in India =

Elections in India
- 2017

The elections in India in 2017 include the seven state legislative assembly elections.

== Maps ==
2017 Punjab Legislative Assembly election

2017 Goa Legislative Assembly election

2017 Uttar Pradesh Legislative Assembly election

2017 Gujarat Legislative Assembly election

2017 Uttarakhand Legislative Assembly election

2017 Himachal Pradesh Legislative Assembly election

2017 Manipur Legislative Assembly election

2017 Andhra Pradesh Legislative Assembly election

== State legislatures ==
Date(s)	State/UT	Government Before	Chief Minister before election	Government After		Elected Chief Minister
4 February 2017	Punjab	Shiromani Akali Dal	Parkash Singh Badal		Indian National Congress	Amarinder Singh
4 February 2017	Punjab	Bharatiya Janata Party	Parkash Singh Badal		Indian National Congress	Amarinder Singh
4 February 2017	Goa	Bharatiya Janata Party	Laxmikant Parsekar		Bharatiya Janata Party	Manohar Parrikar
4 February 2017	Goa	Bharatiya Janata Party	Laxmikant Parsekar		Goa Forward Party	Manohar Parrikar
4 February 2017	Goa	Bharatiya Janata Party	Laxmikant Parsekar		Maharashtrawadi Gomantak Party	Manohar Parrikar
15 February 2017	Uttarakhand	Indian National Congress	Harish Rawat		Bharatiya Janata Party	Trivendra Singh Rawat
15 February 2017	Uttarakhand	Bahujan Samaj Party	Harish Rawat		Bharatiya Janata Party	Trivendra Singh Rawat
15 February 2017	Uttarakhand	Uttarakhand Kranti Dal	Harish Rawat		Bharatiya Janata Party	Trivendra Singh Rawat
11 February 2017 to 9 March 2017	Uttar Pradesh	Samajwadi Party	Akhilesh Yadav		Bharatiya Janata Party	Yogi Adityanath
11 February 2017 to 9 March 2017	Uttar Pradesh	Samajwadi Party	Akhilesh Yadav		Apna Dal (Sonelal)	Yogi Adityanath
11 February 2017 to 9 March 2017	Uttar Pradesh	Samajwadi Party	Akhilesh Yadav		Suheldev Bharatiya Samaj Party	Yogi Adityanath
4 March 2017 & 8 March 2017	Manipur	Indian National Congress	Okram Ibobi Singh		Bharatiya Janata Party	Nongthombam Biren Singh
4 March 2017 & 8 March 2017	Manipur	Indian National Congress	Okram Ibobi Singh		National People's Party	Nongthombam Biren Singh
4 March 2017 & 8 March 2017	Manipur	Indian National Congress	Okram Ibobi Singh		Naga People's Front	Nongthombam Biren Singh
4 March 2017 & 8 March 2017	Manipur	Indian National Congress	Okram Ibobi Singh		Lok Janshakti Party	Nongthombam Biren Singh
11 Feb - 8 Mar 2017	Himachal Pradesh	Indian National Congress	Virbhadra Singh		Bharatiya Janata Party	Jai Ram Thakur
12 Feb - 8 Mar 2017	Gujarat	Bharatiya Janata Party	Vijay Rupani		Bharatiya Janata Party	Vijay Rupani
7 April - 12 May 2017	Andhra Pradesh	Vacant (President's rule)		#F8F9FA	Bharatiya Janata Party	Nitin Gadkari

== Presidential election ==
A presidential election was held in India on 17 July 2017 before the term of the President Pranab Mukherjee ended. Ram Nath Kovind was declared the winner after the counting of votes which was held on 20 July 2017.

Results of the 2017 Indian presidential election
Candidate	Individual votes	Electoral College votes	%
Ram Nath Kovind	2,930	702,044	65.65%
Meira Kumar	1,844	367,314	34.35%
Invalid	77	20,942	

== Vice Presidential election ==
A Vice Presidential election were held in India on 5 August 2017 before the term of Vice President Mohammad Hamid Ansari ends. Venkaiah Naidu was elected as the Vice President of India. Mr Naidu received 516 votes defeating the opposition's candidate, Gopal Krishna Gandhi, who got 244 votes. A total of 771 out of 785 parliamentarians voted in the election. M Venkaiah Naidu's victory margin of 272 votes is the highest in a vice presidential election in the last three decades.

== Parliamentary By-election ==
S.No	Date	Constituency	State/UT	MP before election	Party before election	Elected MP	Party after election
1	4 February 2017	Amritsar	Punjab	Amarinder Singh	Indian National Congress	Gurjeet Singh Aujla	Indian National Congress
4	11 October 2017	Gurdaspur	Punjab	Vinod Khanna	Bharatiya Janata Party	Sunil Jakhar	Indian National Congress
2	9 April 2017	Srinagar	Jammu and Kashmir	Tariq Hameed Karra	Jammu and Kashmir People's Democratic Party	Farooq Abdullah	Jammu & Kashmir National Conference
3	12 April 2017	Malappuram	Kerala	E. Ahamed	Indian Union Muslim League	P.K. Kunhalikutty	Indian Union Muslim League

== Legislative assembly elections ==
Date(s)	State	Government before election	Chief Minister before election	Government after election	Chief Minister after election	Maps
February 2017	Punjab	Shiromani Akali Dal	Parkash Singh Badal	Indian National Congress	Amarinder Singh	
February 2017	Punjab	Bharatiya Janata Party	Parkash Singh Badal	Indian National Congress	Amarinder Singh	
14 February 2017	Goa	Bharatiya Janata Party	Laxmikant Parsekar	Bharatiya Janata Party	Manohar Parrikar	
14 February 2017	Goa	Bharatiya Janata Party	Laxmikant Parsekar	Maharashtrawadi Gomantak Party	Manohar Parrikar	
14 February 2017	Goa	Bharatiya Janata Party	Laxmikant Parsekar	Goa Forward Party	Manohar Parrikar	
15 February 2017	Uttarakhand	Indian National Congress	Harish Rawat	Bharatiya Janata Party	Trivendra Singh Rawat	
15 February 2017	Uttarakhand	Bahujan Samaj Party	Harish Rawat	Bharatiya Janata Party	Trivendra Singh Rawat	
15 February 2017	Uttarakhand	Uttarakhand Kranti Dal	Harish Rawat	Bharatiya Janata Party	Trivendra Singh Rawat	
11 February – 8 March 2017	Uttar Pradesh	Samajwadi Party	Akhilesh Yadav	Bharatiya Janata Party	Yogi Adityanath	
11 February – 8 March 2017	Uttar Pradesh	Samajwadi Party	Akhilesh Yadav	Suheldev Bharatiya Samaj Party	Yogi Adityanath	
11 February – 8 March 2017	Uttar Pradesh	Samajwadi Party	Akhilesh Yadav	Apna Dal	Yogi Adityanath	
4 – 8 March 2017	Manipur	Indian National Congress	Okram Ibobi Singh	Bharatiya Janata Party	N. Biren Singh	
4 – 8 March 2017	Manipur	Indian National Congress	Okram Ibobi Singh	National People's Party	N. Biren Singh	
4 – 8 March 2017	Manipur	Indian National Congress	Okram Ibobi Singh	Naga People's Front	N. Biren Singh	
9 November 2017	Himachal Pradesh	Indian National Congress	Virbhadra Singh	Bharatiya Janata Party	Jai Ram Thakur	
9 and 14 December 2017	Gujarat	Bharatiya Janata Party	Vijay Rupani	Bharatiya Janata Party	Vijay Rupani	

=== Punjab ===
Punjab

Elections for the State assembly were held on 4 February 2017 with 75 per cent voter turnout. In Punjab all the 117 assembly constituencies have triangular contests between major parties makes the results uncertain.

Result was declared on 11 March 2017.

← Summary of the 4 February 2017 Punjab Legislative Assembly election results
Parties and coalitions	Popular vote			Seats		
Parties and coalitions	Votes	%	±pp	Contested	Won	+/−
Indian National Congress (INC)	5,945,899	38.5	▼1.4	117	77	▲31
Aam Aadmi Party (AAP)	3,662,665	23.7	▲23.7	112	20	▲20
Shiromani Akali Dal (SAD)	3,898,161	25.2	▼9.4	94	15	▼41
Bharatiya Janata Party (BJP)	833,092	5.4	▼1.8	23	3	▼9
Independents (IND)	323,243	2.1	▼5.0	303	0	▼3
Bahujan Samaj Party (BSP)	234,400	1.5	▼2.8	117	0	Steady
Lok Insaaf Party (LIP)	189,228	1.2	▲1.2	5	2	▲2
Shiromani Akali Dal (Amritsar) (SAD(M))	49,260	0.3	Steady	54	0	Steady
Aapna Punjab Party (APPA)	37,476	0.2	Steady	78	0	Steady
Revolutionary Marxist Party (RMPOI)	37,243	0.2	Steady	13	0	Steady
Communist Party of India (CPI)	34,074	0.2	▼0.6	23	0	Steady
None of the above (NOTA)	108,471	0.7	▲0.7	—N/a		Steady
Total	15,443,466	100.00			117	±0

=== Goa ===
Goa

Elections for the State assembly were held on 4 February 2017 with 83 per cent turnout. The BJP, MGP, GFP and two independents formed an alliance to win the election.

← Summary of the 4 February 2017 Goa Legislative Assembly election results
Parties and coalitions	Popular vote			Seats	
Parties and coalitions	Votes	%	± %	Won	+/−
Bharatiya Janata Party (BJP)	2,97,588	32.5	▼2.2	13	▼8
Indian National Congress (INC)	2,59,758	28.4	▼2.4	17	▲8
Maharashtrawadi Gomantak Party (MGP)	1,03,290	11.3	▲4.6	3	Steady
Independents (IND)	1,01,922	11.1	▼5.5	3	▼2
Aam Aadmi Party (AAP)	57,420	6.3	▲6.3	0	Steady
Goa Forward Party (GFP)	31,900	3.5	▲3.5	3	▲3
Nationalist Congress Party (NCP)	20,916	2.3	▼1.8	1	▲1
Goa Suraksha Manch (GSM)	10,745	1.2	▲1.2	0	Steady
United Goans Party (UGP)	8,563	0.9	▲0.9	0	Steady
Goa Vikas Party (GVP)	5,379	0.6	▼2.9	0	▼2
Others	7,816	0.9	▼2.9	0	Steady
None of the Above (NOTA)	10,919	1.2	▲1.2	—N/a	
Total	9,16,216	100.00		40	±0
Valid votes	9,16,216	99.85			
Invalid votes	1,416	0.15			
Votes cast / turnout	9,17,832	82.56			
Abstentions	1,93,860	17.44			
Registered voters	11,11,692				

=== Uttar Pradesh ===
Uttar Pradesh

Assembly elections in Uttar Pradesh were held between 11 February and 9 March 2017 in seven phases. Result was declared on 11 March 2017.

← Summary of the 11 February – 8 March 2017 Uttar Pradesh Legislative Assembly election results
Party	Popular vote			Seats		
Party	Votes	%	±pp	Contested	Won	+/−
Bharatiya Janata Party (BJP)	34,403,039	39.7	▲24.7	384	312	▲265
Bahujan Samaj Party (BSP)	19,281,352	22.2	▼3.7	403	19	▼61
Samajwadi Party (SP)	18,923,689	22.0	▼7.7	298	47	▼177
Indian National Congress (INC)	5,416,324	6.2	▼5.4	105	7	▼21
Independents (IND)	2,229,448	2.6	▼1.5	1462	3	▼11
Rashtriya Lok Dal (RLD)	1,545,810	1.8	▼0.5	131	1	▼8
Apna Dal (Sonelal) (ADAL)	851,336	1.0	▲1.0	11	9	▲9
Suheldev Bharatiya Samaj Party (SBSP)	607,911	0.7	▲0.7	8	4	▲4
Nirbal Indian Shoshit Hamara Aam Dal (NINSHAD)	540,542	0.6	▲0.6	100	1	▲1
Peace Party of India (PECP)	227,998	0.3	▼2.0	150	0	▼4
All India Majlis-e-Ittehadul Muslimeen (AIMIM)	205,232	0.2	Steady	38	0	Steady
Lok Dal (LD)	181,704	0.2	▲0.1	81	0	Steady
Bahujan Mukti Party (BMUP)	152,844	0.2	▲0.2	182	0	Steady
Communist Party of India (CPI)	138,763	0.2	Steady	90	0	Steady
Mahan Dal (MD)	96,087	0.1	▼0.8	14	0	Steady
Shiv Sena (SS)	88,595	0.1	▲0.7	150	0	Steady
Other parties	1,080,007	1.2	▼7.3	1643	0	▼3
None of the above (NOTA)	757,643	0.9	▲0.9	—N/a		
Total	86,728,324	100.00			403	±0

=== Uttarakhand ===
Uttarakhand

Elections for the State assembly were held on 15 February 2017 with a 65.64 per cent turnout. Result was declared on 11 March 2017.

← Summary of the 15 February 2017 Uttarakhand Legislative Assembly election results
Parties and coalitions	Popular vote			Seats	
Parties and coalitions	Votes	%	±pp	Won	+/−
Bharatiya Janata Party (BJP)	2,314,250	46.5	▲13.4	57	▲26
Indian National Congress (INC)	1,666,379	33.5	▼0.3	11	▼21
Bahujan Samaj Party (BSP)	347,533	7.0	▼5.2	0	▼3
Uttarakhand Kranti Dal (UKD)	37,041	0.7	▼1.2	0	▼1
Samajwadi Party (SP)	18,202	0.4	▼1.0	0	Steady
Independents (IND)	499,674	10.0	▼2.3	2	▼1
None of the Above (NOTA)	50,439	1.0	—N/a		
Total	4,975,494	100.00		70	±0

=== Manipur ===
Manipur

Assembly elections in Manipur were held on 4 March and 8 March 2017 in two phases. The result was declared on 11 March 2017.

← Summary of the 4–8 March 2017 Manipur Legislative Assembly election results
Parties and coalitions	Popular vote			Seats	
Parties and coalitions	Votes	%	±pp	Won	+/−
Indian National Congress (INC)	582,056	35.1	▼6.9	28	▼19
Bharatiya Janata Party (BJP)	601,539	36.3	▲34.2	21	▲21
Naga People's Front (NPF)	118,850	7.2	▼0.3	4	Steady
National People's Party (NPP)	83,744	5.1	▲3.9	4	▲4
Independents (IND)	83,834	5.1	▲1.8	1	▲1
Lok Janshakti Party (LJP)	42,263	2.5	▲1.9	1	Steady
All India Trinamool Congress (AITC)	23,384	1.4	▼15.6	1	▼4
None of the Above (NOTA)	9,062	0.6	▲0.6	—N/a	
Total		100.00		60	±0

=== Himachal Pradesh ===
Himachal Pradesh

Elections for the State assembly was held on 9 November 2017. Voting turnout recorded 74%, which is highest ever in the state. The results were declared on 18 December 2017. Over 0.9% of all voters in the election specified the 'None of the Above' option, which amounted to than 33,000 votes.

← Summary of the 9 November 2017 Himachal Pradesh Legislative Assembly election results
Parties and coalitions	Popular vote			Seats	
Parties and coalitions	Votes	%	±pp	Won	+/−
Bharatiya Janata Party (BJP)	1,846,432	48.8	▲10.3	44	▲18
Indian National Congress (INC)	1,577,450	41.7	▼1.1	21	▼15
Independents (IND)	239,989	6.3	▼6.1	2	▼3
Communist Party of India (Marxist) (CPI(M))	55,558	1.5	▼0.1	1	▲1
Bahujan Samaj Party (BSP)	18,540	0.5	▼0.7	0	Steady
Himachal Lokhit Party (HLP)	—N/a		▼2.4	0	▼1
None of the Above (NOTA)	34,232	0.9	▲0.9	—N/a	
Total		100.00		68	±0

=== Gujarat ===
Gujarat

Elections for the State Assembly were held on 9 and 14 December 2017. The result was declared on 18 December 2017.

← Summary of the 9–14 December 2017 Gujarat Legislative Assembly election results
Parties and coalitions	Popular vote			Seats	
Parties and coalitions	Votes	%	±pp	Won	+/−
Bharatiya Janata Party (BJP)	1,47,24,427	49.1	▲1.2	99	▼16
Indian National Congress (INC)	1,24,38,937	41.4	▲2.5	77	▲16
Independents (IND)	12,90,278	4.3	▼1.5	3	▲2
Bharatiya Tribal Party (BTP)	2,22,694	0.7	▲0.7	2	▲2
Bahujan Samaj Party (BSP)	2,07,007	0.7	▼0.6	0	Steady
Nationalist Congress Party (NCP)	1,84,815	0.6	▼0.4	1	▼1
All India Hindustan Congress Party (AIHCP)	83,922	0.3	▲0.3	0	Steady
Rashtriya Samajwadi Party (Secular) (RSPS)	45,833	0.2	▲0.2	0	Steady
Aam Aadmi Party (AAP)	24,918	0.1	▲0.1	0	Steady
Janata Dal (United) (JDU)				0	▼1
Gujarat Parivartan Party (GPP)	—N/a		▼3.6	0	▼2
None of the Above (NOTA)	5,51,615	1.8	▲1.8	—N/a	
Total		100.00		182	±0

== Legislative Assembly by-elections ==
=== Andhra Pradesh ===
S.No	Date	Constituency	MLA before election	Party before election	Elected MLA	Party after election
139	23 August 2017	Nandyal	Bhuma Nagi Reddy	YSR Congress Party	Bhuma Brahmananda Reddy	Telugu Desam Party

=== Arunachal Pradesh ===
S.No	Date	Constituency	MLA before election	Party before election	Elected MLA	Party after election
12	21 December 2017	Pakke-Kessang	Kameng Dolo	Indian National Congress	Biyuram Wahge	Bharatiya Janata Party
28	21 December 2017	Likabali	Jomde Kena	Indian National Congress	Kardo Nayigyor	Bharatiya Janata Party

=== Assam ===
S.No	Date	Constituency	MLA before election	Party before election	Elected MLA	Party after election
113	9 April 2017	Dhemaji	Pradan Baruah	Bharatiya Janata Party	Ranoj Pegu	Bharatiya Janata Party

=== Delhi ===
S.No	Date	Constituency	MLA before election	Party before election	Elected MLA	Party after election
27	9 April 2017	Rajouri Garden	Jarnail Singh	Aam Aadmi Party	Manjinder Singh Sirsa	Bharatiya Janata Party
7	23 August 2017	Bawana	Ved Parkash	Aam Aadmi Party	Ram Chander	Aam Aadmi Party

=== Goa ===
S.No	Date	Constituency	MLA before election	Party before election	Elected MLA	Party after election
11	23 August 2017	Panaji	Sidharth Kuncalienker	Bharatiya Janata Party	Manohar Parrikar	Bharatiya Janata Party
19	23 August 2017	Valpoi	Vishwajit Pratapsingh Rane	Indian National Congress	Vishwajit Pratapsingh Rane	Bharatiya Janata Party

=== Himachal Pradesh ===
S.No	Date	Constituency	MLA before election	Party before election	Elected MLA	Party after election
36	9 April 2017	Bhoranj	Ishwar Dass Dhiman	Bharatiya Janata Party	Dr Anil Dhiman	Bharatiya Janata Party

=== Jharkhand ===
S.No	Date	Constituency	MLA before election	Party before election	Elected MLA	Party after election
4	9 April 2017	Litipara	Anil Murmu	Jharkhand Mukti Morcha	Simon Marandi	Jharkhand Mukti Morcha

=== Karnataka ===
S.No	Date	Constituency	MLA before election	Party before election	Elected MLA	Party after election
214	9 April 2017	Nanjangud	Srinivas Prasad	Indian National Congress	Kalale N. Keshavamurthy	Indian National Congress
224	9 April 2017	Gundlupet	H. S. Mahadeva Prasad	Indian National Congress	M.C. Mohan Kumari	Indian National Congress

=== Kerala ===
S.No	Date	Constituency	MLA before election	Party before election	Elected MLA	Party after election
41	11 October 2017	Vengara	P.K. Kunhalikutty	Indian Union Muslim League	K. N. A. Khader	Indian Union Muslim League

=== Madhya Pradesh ===
S.No	Date	Constituency	MLA before election	Party before election	Elected MLA	Party after election
9	9 April 2017	Ater	Satyadev Katare	Indian National Congress	Hemant Katare	Indian National Congress
89	9 April 2017	Bandhavgarh	Gyan Singh	Bharatiya Janata Party	Shiv Narayan Singh	Bharatiya Janata Party
61	9 November 2017	Chitrakoot	Prem Singh	Indian National Congress	Neelanshu Chaturvedi	Indian National Congress

=== Nagaland ===
S.No	Date	Constituency	MLA before election	Party before election	Elected MLA	Party after election
10	29 July 2017	Northern Angami-I	Khriehu Liezietsu	Naga People's Front	Shurhozelie Liezietsu	Naga People's Front

=== Rajasthan ===
S.No	Date	Constituency	MLA before election	Party before election	Elected MLA	Party after election
79	9 April 2017	Dholpur	B.L. Kushwah	Bahujan Samaj Party	Shobha Rani Kushwah	Bharatiya Janata Party

=== Sikkim ===
S.No	Date	Constituency	MLA before election	Party before election	Elected MLA	Party after election
28	12 April 2017	Upper Burtuk	Prem Singh Tamang	Sikkim Krantikari Morcha	Dilli Ram Thapa	Sikkim Democratic Front

=== Tamil Nadu ===
S.No	Date	Constituency	MLA before election	Party before election	Reason	Elected MLA	Party after election
11	21 December 2017	Dr. Radhakrishnan Nagar	J. Jayalalithaa	All India Anna Dravida Munnetra Kazhagam	Died on 5 December 2016	T. T. V. Dhinakaran	Independent politician

=== Uttar Pradesh ===
S.No	Date	Constituency	MLA before election	Party before election	Elected MLA	Party after election
207	21 December 2017	Sikandra	Mathura Prasad Pal	Bharatiya Janata Party	Ajit Singh Pal	Bharatiya Janata Party

=== West Bengal ===
S.No	Date	Constituency	MLA before election	Party before election	Elected MLA	Party after election
216	9 April 2017	Kanthi Dakshin	Dibyendu Adhikari	All India Trinamool Congress	Chandrima Bhattacharya	All India Trinamool Congress
226	21 December 2017	Sabang	Manas Bhunia	Indian National Congress	Geeta Rani Bhunia	All India Trinamool Congress

== See also ==
- 2016 elections in India
- 2018 elections in India
