= Nokmey Namati =

Indian politician

Nokmey Namati was an Indian politician who served as Speaker of Arunachal Pradesh Legislative Assembly and Member of Arunachal Pradesh Legislative Assembly from Khonsa North Assembly Constituency.

== Career ==
He also served as Minister for many Ministries like Education, Labour, Law, Parliamentary Affairs, Legislature and Education Department, Local Self-Government, Panchayat Raj and Health and Family Welfare. He defeated Kabang Borang as speaker of the assembly. He was elected as speaker unanimously on 21 August 1975. In 1978 Arunachal Pradesh Legislative Assembly election, he got 1,866 or 36.65% votes.
