= Wangnia Pongte =

Indian politician and former footballer

Wangnia Pongte (died 15 June 2013) was an Indian politician and former footballer.

He was the Arunachal Pradesh MLA for Changlang North assembly constituency in 1990. He served as MoS (Independent charge) for Research, Library, Labour and Agriculture. He was re-elected in 2004. He was Chairman of Arunachal Pradesh Mineral Development Trading Corporation. He died on 15 June 2013. He had two wives, three daughters and two sons. Pongte was the first Tutsa elected to Arunachal Pradesh Legislative Assembly and often regarded as the Father of Tutsa community.

== Death ==
Pongte died in a traffic collision on 15 June 2013.
