= Gensi =

Coordinates: 27.842°N 94.623°E

Gensi is a town and headquarters of Gensi Circle (tehsil) fall under the charged of EAC (Extra-Assistant Commissioner) located in Lower Siang district (earlier West Siang district) of Arunachal Pradesh state in India.

As per Population Census 2011 in the village 40 families are residing. The village has population of 225 of which there are 114 males and 111 females.
