= List of speakers of the Arunachal Pradesh Legislative Assembly =

Presiding officer in Arunachal Pradesh Legislative Assembly

Speaker of Arunachal Pradesh Legislative Assembly
- Flag of India
- Incumbent; Tesam Pongte since 14 June 2024
- Arunachal Pradesh Legislative Assembly
- Style: The Hon’ble (formal); Mr. Speaker (informal)
- Member of: Arunachal Pradesh Legislative Assembly
- Reports to: Government of Arunachal Pradesh
- Residence: Itanagar
- Appointer: Members of the Arunachal Pradesh Legislative Assembly
- Term length: During the life of the vidhan Sabha (five years maximum)
- Constituting instrument: Article 93 of the Constitution of India
- Formation: 15 August 1975
- First holder: Nokmey Namati
- Deputy: Kardo Nyigyor

The Speaker of Arunachal Pradesh Legislative Assembly is the presiding officer in Arunachal Pradesh Legislative Assembly.

== Powers and functions ==
Speaker and Deputy Speaker of Arunachal Pradesh Legislative Assembly cannot be disqualified for being chosen. The Speaker can nominate or discharge any Member from any committee. The Speaker is the Chairman of Business Advisory Committee in Arunachal Pradesh Legislative Assembly. The Speaker can adjourn the house when there is no quorum.

== Election ==
The election of a Speaker is necessary when a new assembly is formed or if the office is vacant. The election is held on a fixed date which is issued by the Governor of Arunachal Pradesh. The election is held before 3:30 PM.

== List of Speakers ==
The Speakers of Arunachal Pradesh Legislative Assembly are :-

== List of Speakers ==
The following is a chronological list of official Speakers of the Arunachal Pradesh Legislative Assembly.

No.	Name	Term of Office		Party
1	Nokmey Namati	1975	1978	Indian National Congress
2	Padi Yubbe	1978	1979	Janata Party
(1)	Nokmey Namati	1979	1980	Indian National Congress
3	T. L. Rajkumar	1980	1990	Indian National Congress
4	Lijum Ronya	1990	1995	Indian National Congress
5	Tako Dabi	1995	1998	Indian National Congress
6	Chowna Mein	1998	1998	Janata Dal
7	Tamiyo Taga	1999	2003	Bharatiya Janata Party
8	Setong Sena	2003	2009	Indian National Congress
9	Wanglin Lowangdong	2009	2014	Indian National Congress
10	Nabam Rebia	27 May 2014	17 December 2015	Indian National Congress
—	Tenzing Norbu Thongdok (Acting)	17 December 2015	24 February 2016	Indian National Congress
11	Wangki Lowang	25 February 2016	3 June 2019	Bharatiya Janata Party
12	Pasang Dorjee Sona	4 June 2019	13 June 2024	Bharatiya Janata Party
13	Tesam Pongte	14 June 2024	Present	Bharatiya Janata Party

=== Notes ===
- As of January 2026, Tesam Pongte remains the presiding officer. He represents the Changlang North constituency.
- The current Deputy Speaker is Kardo Nyigyor, who was also elected unopposed on 14 June 2024.
