= Likabali =

Coordinates: 27.659°N 94.692°E

Likabali, a town in the foothills, is the Headquarters of 22nd district i.e. Lower Siang district of Arunachal Pradesh state of India.

The town is the headquarters for two Assembly Constituencies namely 28-Likabali and 36-Nari Koyu (Vidhan Sabha constituency). As of 2016 the Member of Legislative Assembly of Likabali was Kardo Nyigyor and Tojir Kadu for Nari-Koyu.
