= Likha Soni =

Indian politician

Member of Arunachal Pradesh Legislative Assembly
- Incumbent
- Assumed office 1 June 2024
- Preceded by: Chau Zingnu Namchoom
- Constituency: Lekang

Personal details
- Party: Nationalist Congress Party

Likha Soni is an Indian politician from Arunachal Pradesh belonging to the Nationalist Congress Party. He is a member of the 11th Arunachal Pradesh Legislative Assembly.
