= Hayuliang Assembly constituency =

Constituency of the Arunachal Pradesh legislative assembly in India

Coordinates: 28.06°N 96.55°E

Hayuliang
- Constituency No. 45 for the Arunachal Pradesh Legislative Assembly

Constituency details
- Country: India
- Region: Northeast India
- State: Arunachal Pradesh
- District: Anjaw
- Lok Sabha constituency: Arunachal East
- Established: 1990
- Total electors: 13,160
- Reservation: ST

Member of Legislative Assembly
- 11th Arunachal Pradesh Legislative Assembly
- Incumbent Dasanglu Pul
- Party: Bharatiya Janata Party
- Elected year: 2024

Hayuliang is one of the 60 assembly constituencies of Arunachal Pradesh, a northeastern state of India. It is part of Arunachal East Lok Sabha constituency.

== Members of the Legislative Assembly ==
Election	Name	Party
1990	Khapriso Krong	Indian National Congress
1995	Kalikho Pul	Indian National Congress
1999	Kalikho Pul	Indian National Congress
2004	Kalikho Pul	Indian National Congress
2009	Kalikho Pul	Indian National Congress
2014	Kalikho Pul	Indian National Congress
2016 (Note: by-election)	Dasanglu Pul	Bharatiya Janata Party
2019	Dasanglu Pul	Bharatiya Janata Party
2024	Dasanglu Pul	Bharatiya Janata Party

== Election results ==
=== 2019 ===
2019 Arunachal Pradesh Legislative Assembly election: Hayuliang
Party	Candidate	Votes	%	±%
BJP	Dasanglu Pul	6,149	55.25	
INC	Lupalum Kri	4,817	43.28	
NOTA	None of the Above	163	1.46	
Majority		1,332	11.97	
Turnout		11,129	90.66	
BJP hold		Swing		

=== 2016 by-election ===
2016 by-election: Hayuliang
Party	Candidate	Votes	%	±%
BJP	Dasanglu Pul	5,326		
Independent	Yompi Kri	4384		
Majority				
Turnout				
BJP gain from INC		Swing		

=== 2014 ===
2014 Arunachal Pradesh Legislative Assembly election: Hayuliang
Party	Candidate	Votes	%	±%
INC	Kalikho Pul	7,272	77.68	
BJP	Banim Kri	1,502	16.05	
PPA	Ejenso Yun	441	4.71	
NOTA	None of the Above	146	1.56	
Majority		5,770	61.63	
Turnout		9,361	87.10	
INC hold		Swing		

=== 2009 ===
2009 Arunachal Pradesh Legislative Assembly election: Hayuliang
Party	Candidate	Votes	%	±%
INC	Kalikho Pul	7,788	85.26	
AITC	Baritlum Ama	998	10.93	
BJP	Banim Kri	250	2.74	
NCP	Khuje Drai	98	1.07	
Majority		6,790	74.33	
Turnout		9,134	91.86	
INC hold		Swing		

=== 2004 ===
2004 Arunachal Pradesh Legislative Assembly election: Hayuliang
Party	Candidate	Votes	%	±%
INC	Kalikho Pul	4,658	60.42	
BJP	Khapriso Krong	3,058	39.63	
Majority		1,600	20.74	
Turnout		7,716		
INC hold		Swing		

=== 1999 ===
1999 Arunachal Pradesh Legislative Assembly election: Hayuliang
Party	Candidate	Votes	%	±%
INC	Kalikho Pul	6,778	86.18	
BJP	Khuje Drai	566	7.20	
AC	Chandolum Chira	521	6.62	
Majority		6,212	78.98	
Turnout		8,144	81.26	
INC hold		Swing		

=== 1995 ===
1995 Arunachal Pradesh Legislative Assembly election: Hayuliang
Party	Candidate	Votes	%	±%
INC	Kalikho Pul	5,261	67.24	
JD	Khapriso Krong	2,563	32.76	
Majority		2,698	34.48	
Turnout		7,969	87.00	
INC gain from Independent		Swing		

=== 1990 ===
1990 Arunachal Pradesh Legislative Assembly election: Hayuliang
Party	Candidate	Votes	%	±%
Independent	Khapriso Krong	2,869	43.42	
Independent	Piola Kri	2,008	30.39	
INC	Soli Kri	1,730	26.18	
Majority		861	13.03	
Turnout		6,726	75.66	
Independent win (new seat)				

== See also ==
- Hayuliang
- Anjaw district
- List of constituencies of Arunachal Pradesh Legislative Assembly
