= Rode Bui =

Indian politician

Member of Arunachal Pradesh Legislative Assembly
- Incumbent
- Assumed office 2019
- Preceded by: Pakgna Bage
- Constituency: Dumporijo

Personal details
- Party: Bharatiya Janata Party

Rode Bui is an Indian politician from Arunachal Pradesh belonging to the Bharatiya Janata Party. He is a member of the 11th Arunachal Pradesh Legislative Assembly representing the Dumporijo constituency.
