= Puinnyo Apum =

Indian politician

Member of Arunachal Pradesh Legislative Assembly
- Incumbent
- Assumed office 1 June 2024
- Preceded by: Mopi Mihu
- Constituency: Dambuk

Personal details
- Party: Bharatiya Janata Party

Puinnyo Apum is an Indian politician from Arunachal Pradesh belonging to the Bharatiya Janata Party. He is a member of the 11th Arunachal Pradesh Legislative Assembly, representing the Dambuk constituency.
