= Likabali Assembly constituency =

Constituency of the Arunachal Pradesh legislative assembly in India

Coordinates: 27.64°N 94.65°E

Likabali
- Constituency No. 28 for the Arunachal Pradesh Legislative Assembly

Constituency details
- Country: India
- Region: Northeast India
- State: Arunachal Pradesh
- District: Lower Siang
- Lok Sabha constituency: Arunachal East
- Established: 1990
- Total electors: 12,398
- Reservation: ST

Member of Legislative Assembly
- 11th Arunachal Pradesh Legislative Assembly
- Incumbent Kardo Nyigyor
- Party: Bharatiya Janata Party
- Elected year: 2024

Likabali is one of the 60 assembly constituencies of Arunachal Pradesh, a northeastern state of India. It is part of Arunachal East Lok Sabha constituency.

== Members of the Legislative Assembly ==
Year	Member	Party
1990	Rima Taipodia	Janata Dal
1995	Kardu Taipodia	Indian National Congress
1999	Rima Taipodia	Indian National Congress
2004	Jomde Kena	Independent politician
2009	Jomde Kena	Indian National Congress
2014	Jomde Kena	Indian National Congress
2017 By-election	Kardo Nyigyor	Bharatiya Janata Party
2019	Kardo Nyigyor	People's Party of Arunachal
2024	Kardo Nyigyor	Bharatiya Janata Party

== Election results ==
=== Assembly Election 2024 ===
2024 Arunachal Pradesh Legislative Assembly election : Likabali
Party	Candidate	Votes	%	±%
BJP	Kardo Nyigyor	6,607	62.00%	▲25.51
Independent	Moli Riba	4,002	37.55%	New
NOTA	None of the Above	48	0.45%	▲0.30
Margin of victory		2,605	24.44%	▲22.61
Turnout		10,657	85.96%	▲0.31
Registered electors		12,398		▲9.58
BJP gain from PPA		Swing	▲23.67	

=== Assembly Election 2019 ===
2019 Arunachal Pradesh Legislative Assembly election : Likabali
Party	Candidate	Votes	%	±%
PPA	Kardo Nyigyor	3,714	38.33%	▼2.78
BJP	Tapak Lendo	3,536	36.49%	▼8.59
INC	Mimar Nyodu	1,809	18.67%	▲13.95
NPP	Iken Tao	527	5.44%	New
JD(S)	Dr Rima Taipodia	89	0.92%	New
NOTA	None of the Above	15	0.15%	▼0.14
Margin of victory		178	1.84%	▼2.14
Turnout		9,690	85.65%	▲13.28
Registered electors		11,314		▲6.66
PPA gain from BJP		Swing	▼6.75	

=== Assembly By-election 2017 ===
2017 Arunachal Pradesh Legislative Assembly by-election : Likabali
Party	Candidate	Votes	%	±%
BJP	Kardo Nyigyor	3,461	45.08%	▲22.63
PPA	Gumke Riba	3,156	41.11%	New
Independent	Sengo Taipodia	675	8.79%	New
INC	Modam Dini	362	4.72%	▼36.28
NOTA	None of the Above	23	0.30%	New
Margin of victory		305	3.97%	▼2.45
Turnout		7,677	72.37%	▼11.47
Registered electors		10,608		▲3.46
BJP gain from INC		Swing	▲4.09	

=== Assembly Election 2014 ===
2014 Arunachal Pradesh Legislative Assembly election : Likabali
Party	Candidate	Votes	%	±%
INC	Jomde Kena	3,524	41.00%	▲0.61
Independent	Yai Mara	2,972	34.57%	New
BJP	Gumke Riba	1,930	22.45%	New
AAP	Kirri Dini Bogum	142	1.65%	New
NOTA	None of the Above	28	0.33%	New
Margin of victory		552	6.42%	▼4.12
Turnout		8,596	83.84%	▲0.72
Registered electors		10,253		▲0.64
INC hold		Swing	▲0.61	

=== Assembly Election 2009 ===
2009 Arunachal Pradesh Legislative Assembly election : Likabali
Party	Candidate	Votes	%	±%
INC	Jomde Kena	3,420	40.39%	▼2.12
AITC	Yai Mara	2,527	29.84%	New
NCP	Gumke Riba	2,477	29.25%	New
PPA	Kardu Taipodia	44	0.52%	New
Margin of victory		893	10.55%	▼4.44
Turnout		8,468	83.12%	▲6.78
Registered electors		10,188		▲9.57
INC gain from Independent		Swing	▼17.11	

=== Assembly Election 2004 ===
2004 Arunachal Pradesh Legislative Assembly election : Likabali
Party	Candidate	Votes	%	±%
Independent	Jomde Kena	4,081	57.50%	New
INC	Rima Taipodia	3,017	42.50%	▲8.71
Margin of victory		1,064	14.99%	▲12.44
Turnout		7,098	73.62%	▲0.65
Registered electors		9,298		▲23.86
Independent gain from INC		Swing		

=== Assembly Election 1999 ===
1999 Arunachal Pradesh Legislative Assembly election : Likabali
Party	Candidate	Votes	%	±%
INC	Rima Taipodia	1,920	33.79%	▼32.37
Independent	Jomde Kena	1,775	31.24%	New
NCP	Kardu Taipodia	828	14.57%	New
AC	Mikar Nyori	769	13.53%	New
BJP	Tahum Taipodia	390	6.86%	▲4.94
Margin of victory		145	2.55%	▼31.70
Turnout		5,682	78.46%	▼4.42
Registered electors		7,507		▲5.44
INC hold		Swing	▼32.37	

=== Assembly Election 1995 ===
1995 Arunachal Pradesh Legislative Assembly election : Likabali
Party	Candidate	Votes	%	±%
INC	Kardu Taipodia	3,774	66.16%	▲19.24
Independent	Rima Taipodia	1,820	31.91%	New
BJP	Mempak Taso	110	1.93%	New
Margin of victory		1,954	34.26%	▲28.10
Turnout		5,704	81.03%	▲11.30
Registered electors		7,120		▼4.91
INC gain from JD		Swing		

=== Assembly Election 1990 ===
1990 Arunachal Pradesh Legislative Assembly election : Likabali
Party	Candidate	Votes	%	±%
JD	Rima Taipodia	2,735	53.08%	New
INC	Kardu Taipodia	2,418	46.92%	New
Margin of victory		317	6.15%	
Turnout		5,153	70.03%	
Registered electors		7,488		
JD win (new seat)				

== See also ==
- Likabali
- Lower Siang district
- List of constituencies of Arunachal Pradesh Legislative Assembly
