= Oni Panyang =

Indian politician

Member of Arunachal Pradesh Legislative Assembly
- Incumbent
- Assumed office 1 June 2024
- Preceded by: Kanggong Taku
- Constituency: Mariyang-Geku

Personal details
- Party: National People's Party

Oni Panyang is an Indian politician from Arunachal Pradesh belonging to the National People's Party. He is a member of the 11th Arunachal Pradesh Legislative Assembly from the Mariyang-Geku constituency.

== Education ==
He graduated from Jawaharlal Nehru College with a Bachelor of Arts degree in 2001.
