= Changlang North Assembly constituency =

Legislative Assembly constituency in Arunachal Pradesh state, India

Coordinates: 27.759°N 96.619°E

Changlang North
- Constituency No. 53 for the Arunachal Pradesh Legislative Assembly

Constituency details
- Country: India
- Region: Northeast India
- State: Arunachal Pradesh
- District: Changlang
- Lok Sabha constituency: Arunachal East
- Established: 1990
- Total electors: 10,341
- Reservation: ST

Member of Legislative Assembly
- 11th Arunachal Pradesh Legislative Assembly
- Incumbent Tesam Pongte
- Party: Bharatiya Janata Party
- Elected year: 2024

Changlang North is one of the 60 Legislative Assembly constituencies of Arunachal Pradesh state in India. It is in Changlang district and is reserved for candidates belonging to the Scheduled Tribes. It has existed since 1990. As of 2024, its representative is Tesam Pongte of the Bharatiya Janata Party.

== Members of the Legislative Assembly ==
Election	Name	Party
1990	Wangnia Pongte	Indian National Congress
1995	Thinghap Taiju	Independent
1999	Thinghap Taiju	Indian National Congress
2004	Wangnia Pongte	Indian National Congress
2009	Thinghap Taiju	Indian National Congress
2014	Tesam Pongte	Bharatiya Janata Party
2019	Tesam Pongte	Bharatiya Janata Party
2024	Tesam Pongte	Bharatiya Janata Party

== Election results ==
=== Assembly Election 2024 ===
2024 Arunachal Pradesh Legislative Assembly election : Changlang North
Party	Candidate	Votes	%	±%
BJP	Tesam Pongte	4,524	51.81%	▼16.54
NPP	Dihom Kitnya	2,522	28.88%	New
INC	Marina Kenglang	1,547	17.72%	▼12.59
NCP	Nyasam Jongsam	75	0.86%	New
NOTA	None of the Above	64	0.73%	▼0.60
Margin of victory		2,002	22.93%	▼15.12
Turnout		8,732	84.44%	▲0.74
Registered electors		10,341		▲9.22
BJP hold		Swing	▼16.54	

=== Assembly Election 2019 ===
2019 Arunachal Pradesh Legislative Assembly election : Changlang North
Party	Candidate	Votes	%	±%
BJP	Tesam Pongte	5,417	68.35%	▲21.52
INC	Thinghaap Taiju	2,402	30.31%	▼2.59
NOTA	None of the Above	106	1.34%	▲0.06
Margin of victory		3,015	38.04%	▲24.11
Turnout		7,925	83.70%	▲2.71
Registered electors		9,468		▲3.01
BJP hold		Swing	▲21.52	

=== Assembly Election 2014 ===
2014 Arunachal Pradesh Legislative Assembly election : Changlang North
Party	Candidate	Votes	%	±%
BJP	Tesam Pongte	3,486	46.83%	New
INC	Thinghaap Taiju	2,449	32.90%	▼20.01
NCP	Nongming Kamba Longchang	1,211	16.27%	▲5.86
NPF	Hmppa Taidong	203	2.73%	New
NOTA	None of the Above	95	1.28%	New
Margin of victory		1,037	13.93%	▼2.30
Turnout		7,444	80.99%	▼3.75
Registered electors		9,191		▲0.81
BJP gain from INC		Swing	▼6.08	

=== Assembly Election 2009 ===
2009 Arunachal Pradesh Legislative Assembly election : Changlang North
Party	Candidate	Votes	%	±%
INC	Thinghaap Taiju	4,088	52.91%	▲8.58
AITC	Wangnia Pongte	2,834	36.68%	New
NCP	Hmppa Taidong	804	10.41%	New
Margin of victory		1,254	16.23%	▲5.62
Turnout		7,726	84.74%	▲17.47
Registered electors		9,117		▼18.97
INC hold		Swing		

=== Assembly Election 2004 ===
2004 Arunachal Pradesh Legislative Assembly election : Changlang North
Party	Candidate	Votes	%	±%
INC	Wangnia Pongte	3,356	44.33%	▼3.83
Independent	Thinghaap Taiju	2,553	33.73%	New
BJP	Tengam Ngemu	1,661	21.94%	▲4.65
Margin of victory		803	10.61%	▼3.01
Turnout		7,570	64.30%	▼2.17
Registered electors		11,252		▲7.04
INC hold		Swing		

=== Assembly Election 1999 ===
1999 Arunachal Pradesh Legislative Assembly election : Changlang North
Party	Candidate	Votes	%	±%
INC	Thinghaap Taiju	3,516	48.16%	▼1.22
Independent	Wangnia Pongte	2,522	34.55%	New
BJP	Tengam Ngemu	1,262	17.29%	New
Margin of victory		994	13.62%	▲12.39
Turnout		7,300	71.58%	▼15.11
Registered electors		10,512		▲33.38
INC gain from Independent		Swing		

=== Assembly Election 1995 ===
1995 Arunachal Pradesh Legislative Assembly election : Changlang North
Party	Candidate	Votes	%	±%
Independent	Thinghaap Taiju	3,373	50.62%	New
INC	Wangnia Pongte	3,291	49.38%	▲7.90
Margin of victory		82	1.23%	▼10.10
Turnout		6,664	87.24%	▲14.75
Registered electors		7,881		▲12.55
Independent gain from INC		Swing		

=== Assembly Election 1990 ===
1990 Arunachal Pradesh Legislative Assembly election : Changlang North
Party	Candidate	Votes	%	±%
INC	Wangnia Pongte	2,028	41.49%	New
JD	Thinghaap Taiju	1,474	30.16%	New
Independent	Phosum Khimhun	1,359	27.80%	New
Independent	Kapsam	27	0.55%	New
Margin of victory		554	11.33%	
Turnout		4,888	71.39%	
Registered electors		7,002		
INC win (new seat)				

== See also ==
- List of constituencies of Arunachal Pradesh Legislative Assembly
- Changlang district
