= Dongru Siongju =

Indian politicians

Member of the Arunachal Pradesh Legislative Assembly

Dongru Siongju is an Indian politician who is serving as a member of the Arunachal Pradesh Legislative Assembly from the Bomdila Assembly constituency. In December 2020, he switched to the Bharatiya Janata Party.
