= Arunachal Pradesh Legislative Assembly =

Legislature of Arunachal Pradesh state in India

- 11th Arunachal Pradesh Assembly

Type
- Type: Unicameral
- Term limits: 5 years

History
- Founded: 14 March 1978 (48 years ago)

Leadership
- Governor: K. T. Parnaik
- Speaker: Tesam Pongte, BJP since 14 June 2024
- Deputy Speaker: Kardo Nyigyor, BJP since 14 June 2024
- Chief Minister (Leader of the House): Pema Khandu, BJP since May 2019
- Deputy Chief Minister (Deputy Leader of the House): Chowna Mein, BJP since May 2019
- Leader of the Opposition: Vacant (Note: No party secured 10% of seats to get Leader of opposition status.)

Structure
- Seats: 60
- Political groups: Government (46): BJP (46); Confidence and supply (13): PPA (6); NCP (3); IND (3); NPP (1); Opposition (1): INC(1)

Elections
- Voting system: First past the post
- Last election: 19 April 2024
- Next election: 2029

Meeting place
- Vidhan Bhavan, Itanagar, Arunachal Pradesh

Website
- arla.neva.gov.in

The Arunachal Pradesh Legislative Assembly is the unicameral state legislature of Arunachal Pradesh state in north-eastern India. The seat of the Legislative Assembly is at Itanagar, the capital of the state. The Legislative Assembly comprises 60 Members of Legislative Assembly directly elected from single-seat constituencies.

== History ==
On 29 December 1969, the Agency Council, an apex advisory body for the governance of the North-East Frontier Agency (present-day Arunachal Pradesh), came into existence, with the Governor of Assam as its chairman. The Agency Council was replaced by the Pradesh Council on 2 October 1972. On 15 August 1975 the Pradesh Council was converted to the Provisional Legislative Assembly. Initially, the Legislative Assembly comprised 33 members, of which, 30 members were directly elected from single-seat constituencies and 3 members were nominated by the Union government. On attainment of the statehood on 20 February 1987, the number was raised to 60.

== Designations and present members ==
The present assembly is the Tenth Legislative Assembly of Arunachal Pradesh.

Designation	Name
Governor	Kaiwalya Trivikram Parnaik
Speaker	Tesam Pongte
Deputy Speaker	Kardo Nyigyor
Leader of the House (Chief Minister of State)	Pema Khandu
Deputy Chief Minister of State	Chowna Mein
Leader of the Opposition	Vacant

== Members of Legislative Assembly ==
District	No.	Constituency	Name	Party	Remarks
Tawang	1	Lumla (ST)	Tsering Lhamu	Bharatiya Janata Party	
Tawang	2	Tawang (ST)	Namgey Tsering	People's Party of Arunachal	Switched from NPP to PPA
Tawang	3	Mukto (ST)	Pema Khandu	Bharatiya Janata Party	Chief Minister
West Kameng	4	Dirang (ST)	Phurpa Tsering	Bharatiya Janata Party	
West Kameng	5	Kalaktang (ST)	Tseten Chombay Kee	Bharatiya Janata Party	
West Kameng	6	Thrizino-Buragaon (ST)	Tenzin Nyima Glow	Independent	
West Kameng	7	Bomdila (ST)	Dongru Siongju	Bharatiya Janata Party	
East Kameng	8	Bameng (ST)	Kumar Waii	Indian National Congress	
East Kameng	9	Chayangtajo (ST)	Hayeng Mangfi	Bharatiya Janata Party	
East Kameng	10	Seppa East (ST)	Ealing Tallang	Bharatiya Janata Party	
East Kameng	11	Seppa West (ST)	Mama Natung	Bharatiya Janata Party	Cabinet Minister
Pakke-Kessang	12	Pakke-Kessang (ST)	Biyuram Wahge	Bharatiya Janata Party	Cabinet Minister
Papum Pare	13	Itanagar (ST)	Techi Kaso	Bharatiya Janata Party	
Papum Pare	14	Doimukh (ST)	Nabam Vivek	People's Party of Arunachal	
Papum Pare	15	Sagalee (ST)	Ratu Techi	Bharatiya Janata Party	
Lower Subansiri	16	Yachuli (ST)	Toko Tatung	Nationalist Congress Party	
Lower Subansiri	17	Ziro–Hapoli (ST)	Hage Appa	Bharatiya Janata Party	
Kra-Daadi	18	Palin (ST)	Balo Raja	Bharatiya Janata Party	Cabinet Minister
Kurung Kumey	19	Nyapin (ST)	Tai Nikio	Bharatiya Janata Party	
Kra-Daadi	20	Tali (ST)	Jikke Tako	Bharatiya Janata Party	
Kurung Kumey	21	Koloriang (ST)	Pani Taram	Bharatiya Janata Party	
Upper Subansiri	22	Nacho (ST)	Nakap Nalo	Bharatiya Janata Party	
Upper Subansiri	23	Taliha (ST)	Nyato Dukam	Bharatiya Janata Party	Cabinet Minister
Upper Subansiri	24	Daporijo (ST)	Taniya Soki	Bharatiya Janata Party	
Kamle	25	Raga (ST)	Rotom Tebin	Bharatiya Janata Party	
Upper Subansiri	26	Dumporijo (ST)	Rode Bui	Bharatiya Janata Party	
West Siang	27	Liromoba (ST)	Pesi Jilen	People's Party of Arunachal	Switched from NPP to PPA
Lower Siang	28	Likabali (ST)	Kardo Nyigyor	Bharatiya Janata Party	
Lepa Rada	29	Basar (ST)	Nyabi Jini Dirchi	Bharatiya Janata Party	
West Siang	30	Along West (ST)	Topin Ete	Bharatiya Janata Party	
West Siang	31	Along East (ST)	Kento Jini	Bharatiya Janata Party	Cabinet Minister
Siang	32	Rumgong (ST)	Talem Taboh	Bharatiya Janata Party	
Shi Yomi	33	Mechuka (ST)	Pasang Dorjee Sona	Bharatiya Janata Party	Cabinet Minister
Upper Siang	34	Tuting–Yingkiong (ST)	Alo Libang	Bharatiya Janata Party	
Siang	35	Pangin (ST)	Ojing Tasing	Bharatiya Janata Party	Cabinet Minister
Lower Siang	36	Nari-Koyu (ST)	Tojir Kadu	Bharatiya Janata Party	
East Siang	37	Pasighat West (ST)	Ninong Ering	Bharatiya Janata Party	
East Siang	38	Pasighat East (ST)	Tapi Darang	People's Party of Arunachal	Switched from NPP to PPA
East Siang	39	Mebo (ST)	Oken Tayeng	People's Party of Arunachal	
Upper Siang	40	Mariyang-Geku (ST)	Oni Panyang	People's Party of Arunachal	Switched from NPP to PPA
Dibang Valley	41	Anini (ST)	Mopi Mihu	Bharatiya Janata Party	
Lower Dibang Valley	42	Dambuk (ST)	Puinnyo Apum	Bharatiya Janata Party	
Lower Dibang Valley	43	Roing (ST)	Mutchu Mithi	Bharatiya Janata Party	
Lohit	44	Tezu (ST)	Mahesh Chai	Bharatiya Janata Party	
Anjaw	45	Hayuliang (ST)	Dasanglu Pul	Bharatiya Janata Party	Cabinet Minister
Namsai	46	Chowkham (ST)	Chowna Mein	Bharatiya Janata Party	Deputy Chief Minister
Namsai	47	Namsai (ST)	Chau Zingnu Namchoom	Bharatiya Janata Party	
Namsai	48	Lekang (ST)	Lekhiya Soni	Nationalist Congress Party	
Changlang	49	Bordumsa-Diyun	Nikh Kamin	Nationalist Congress Party	
Changlang	50	Miao (ST)	Kamlung Mossang	Bharatiya Janata Party	
Changlang	51	Nampong (ST)	Laisam Simai	Independent	
Changlang	52	Changlang South (ST)	Hamjong Tangha	Bharatiya Janata Party	
Changlang	53	Changlang North(ST)	Tesam Pongte	Bharatiya Janata Party	Speaker of the House
Tirap	54	Namsang (ST)	Wangki Lowang	Bharatiya Janata Party	
Tirap	55	Khonsa East (ST)	Wanglam Sawin	Independent	
Tirap	56	Khonsa West (ST)	Chakat Aboh	Bharatiya Janata Party	
Tirap	57	Borduria–Bagapani (ST)	Wanglin Lowangdong	Bharatiya Janata Party	
Longding	58	Kanubari (ST)	Gabriel Denwang Wangsu	Bharatiya Janata Party	Cabinet Minister
Longding	59	Longding–Pumao (ST)	Thangwang Wangham	National People's Party	
Longding	60	Pongchau-Wakka (ST)	Honchun Ngandam	Bharatiya Janata Party	

== See also ==
- List of constituencies of Arunachal Pradesh Legislative Assembly
- Government of Arunachal Pradesh
- List of governors of Arunachal Pradesh
- List of chief ministers of Arunachal Pradesh
