= Pasang Dorjee Sona =

Indian politician

Speaker of Arunachal Pradesh Legislative Assembly
- In office 4 June 2019 – 13 June 2024
- Preceded by: Wangki Lowang
- Succeeded by: Tesam Pongte
- Constituency: Mechuka

Personal details
- Born: 6 November 1972 (age 53) Singbir Village, Mechukha, Shi-Yomi
- Party: Bharatiya Janata Party

Pasang Dorjee Sona (born 6 November 1972) is an Indian politician from the state of Arunachal Pradesh. He represents the Mechukha constituency in the Arunachal Pradesh Legislative Assembly. He is currently a member of the Bharatiya Janata Party.

== Career ==
Sona was elected as MLA for the first time in 2009 from the 33rd Mechukha Assembly (ST) Constituency representing the Indian National Congress.

He was re-elected in the 2014 Assembly Election as a member of the People's Party of Arunachal and served as Parliamentary Secretary (Tourism) in the Government of Arunachal Pradesh.

Pasang Dorjee Sona won re-election for a third consecutive time in 2019, this time as a BJP candidate, and was elected as the Deputy Speaker of the 7th Legislative Assembly on 4 June 2019.

On 12 January 2021, Sona was unanimously elected as Chairman of the Commonwealth Parliamentary Association (CPA) India Region Zone-III.

In the 2024 Arunachal Pradesh Legislative Assembly election, Sona was again re-elected with a huge majority for a fourth term. He was inducted into the Pema Khandu-led State Government as a Cabinet Minister on 13 June 2024 and was allotted the portfolios of Minister of Education, Rural Works, Parliamentary Affairs, Tourism, and Libraries.

== See also ==
- Arunachal Pradesh Legislative Assembly
