= Tesam Pongte =

Indian politician

Speaker of Arunachal Pradesh Legislative Assembly
- Incumbent
- Assumed office 14 June 2024
- Leader of the House: Pema Khandu
- Deputy Speaker: Kardo Nyigyor
- Preceded by: Pasang Dorjee Sona

Deputy Speaker of Arunachal Pradesh Legislative Assembly
- In office 2019–2024
- Succeeded by: Kardo Nyigyor

Member of Arunachal Pradesh Legislative Assembly
- Incumbent
- Assumed office 2014
- Preceded by: Thinghap Taiju
- Constituency: Changlang North

Personal details
- Party: BJP
- Education: Changlang High Secondary School
- Occupation: Leader
- Profession: Business

Tesam Pongte is an Indian politician from the Bharatiya Janata Party, and the current Speaker of the Arunachal Pradesh Legislative Assembly. He is a member of the Arunachal Pradesh Legislative Assembly from the Changlang North Assembly constituency.

Tesam Pongte was elected unopposed as Assembly Speaker on 16 June 2024.

== See also ==
- Arunachal Pradesh Legislative Assembly
