= Kardo Nyigyor =

Indian politician

Deputy Speaker of Arunachal Pradesh Legislative Assembly
- Incumbent
- Assumed office 14 June 2024
- Speaker: Tesam Pongte
- Chief Minister: Pema Khandu

Member of Arunachal Pradesh Legislative Assembly
- Incumbent
- Assumed office 2017
- Preceded by: Jomde Kena
- Constituency: Likabali

Personal details
- Party: Bharatiya Janata Party
- Other political affiliations: People's Party of Arunachal

Kardo Nyigyor is an Indian politician belonging to the Bharatiya Janata Party. He is a member of the Arunachal Pradesh Legislative Assembly.

== Political life ==
Nyigyor was elected as a legislator to the Arunachal Pradesh Legislative Assembly in a 2017 by-election as a Bharatiya Janata Party candidate from Likabali. He joined the People's Party of Arunachal in 2019. He was elected again as a member of the Arunachal Pradesh Legislative Assembly from Likabali in 2019 and 2024.

Kardo Nyigyor was elected unopposed as Assembly Deputy Speaker on 16 June 2024.
