= Lower Siang district =

- District of Arunachal Pradesh
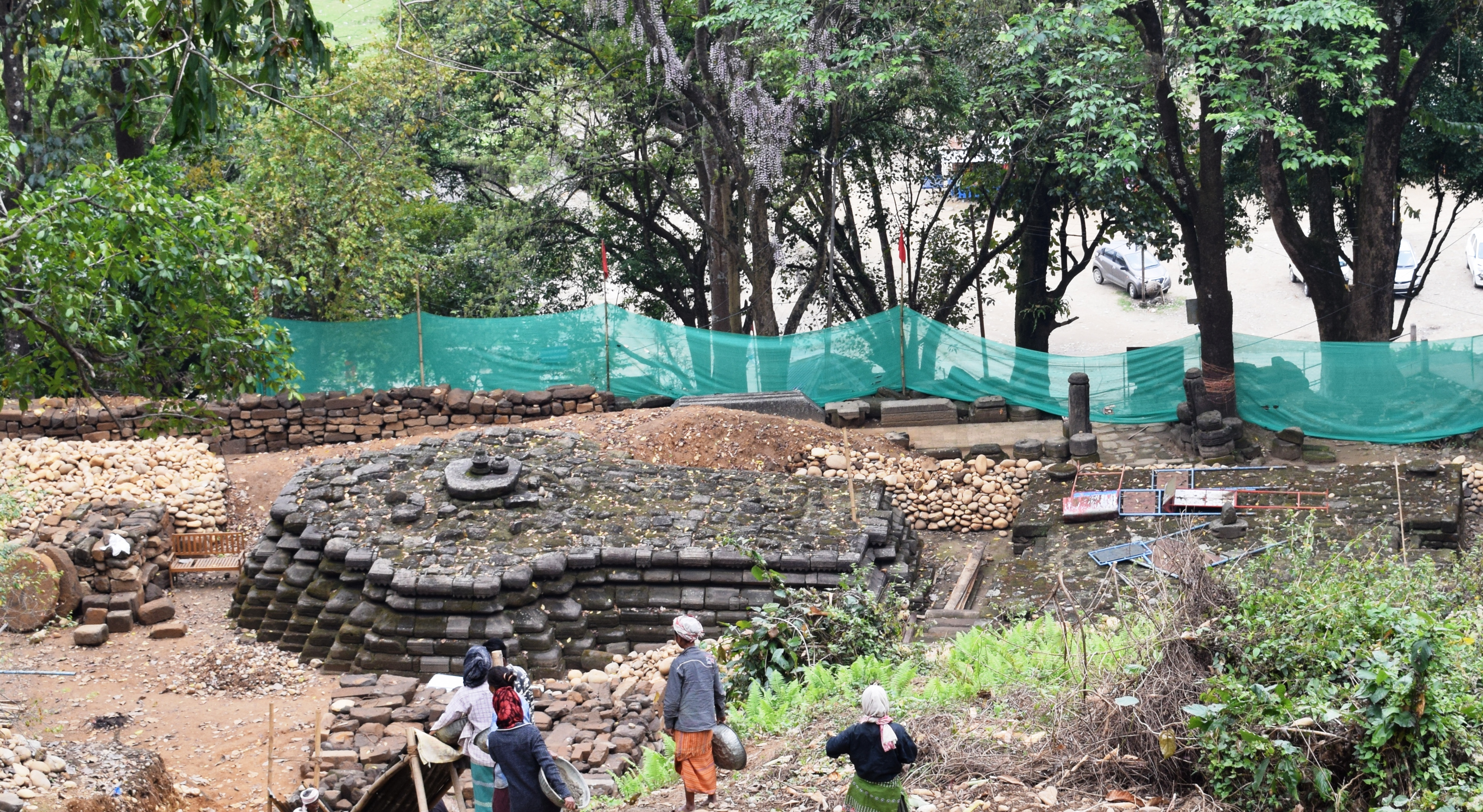
- Malini Than, a ruined temple
- Lower Siang district Location in Arunachal Pradesh
- Country: India
- State: Arunachal Pradesh
- Headquarters: likhabali

Population (2011)
  - Total: 22,630
- Time zone: UTC+05:30 (IST)
- Website: https://siang.nic.in/

Lower Siang district (/ˈsjæŋ/ or /ˈsɪæŋ/) is one of the 25 administrative districts in the state of Arunachal Pradesh, India. The new district was carved out of West Siang and East Siang districts and declared operational on 22 September 2017, making it the 22nd district of Arunachal Pradesh.

== History ==
The foothills and lower hills of the district formed part of the Chutia kingdom, which tradition holds was founded in 1187 CE by the chieftain Birpal in the area around present-day Sadiya. At its height, the Chutia state extended over the lower hills of the Abor, Miri, Dafla and Mishmi hill ranges as well as the plains of upper Assam, and controlled the region that now makes up East Siang. The kingdom fell to the Ahoms in around 1523-1524, after which most of the district was left under the effective control of the Adi people and Mising people. The Mising people gradually descended onto the plains of Assam while the Adi people resisted both Ahom and later British attempts to extend authority over them.

The creation of the Lower Siang district was approved by the Arunachal Pradesh government of Nabam Tuki on 21 March 2013. The Government of Arunachal Pradesh approved creation of Lower Siang along with three other new districts in January 2013. Its territory was carved out of West Siang and East Siang districts.

The official formation of Lower Siang was delayed over disagreement upon the location of its headquarters. On 22 September 2017 the commencement of operation of Lower Siang district, with Likabali as the temporary headquarters, was approved by the government led by Chief Minister Pema Khandu. On 16 March the Arunachal assembly selected Siji as the headquarters.

== Administration ==
The Lower Siang District is composed of Likabali and Nari-Koyu Assembly Constituencies.

== Demographics ==
Lower Siang had a population of 22,630. Scheduled Tribes make up 17,865 (78.94%).

Religions in Lower Siang district (2011)
Religion	Percent
Christianity	41.81%
Donyi-Polo	37.46%
Hinduism	19.05%
Islam	0.99%
Other or not stated	0.69%

=== Languages ===
At the time of the 2011 census, 71.98% of the population spoke Galo, 5.14% Nepali, 3.84% Bodo, 3.60% Adi, 3.23% Bengali, 2.55% Assamese, 2.26% Hindi, 2.23% Adi Miniyong and 1.25% Mishing as their first language.
