= Arunachal West Lok Sabha constituency =

Lok Sabha Constituency in Arunachal Pradesh

Coordinates: 27.7°N 93.4°E

Arunachal West AR-1
- Lok Sabha constituency
- Interactive Map Outlining Arunachal West. Lok Sabha constituency

Constituency details
- Country: India
- Region: Northeast India
- State: Arunachal Pradesh
- Assembly constituencies: 33: Lumla, Tawang, Mukto, Dirang, Kalaktang, Thrizino-Buragaon, Bomdila, Bameng, Chayangtajo, Seppa East, Seppa West, Pakke-Kessang, Itanagar, Doimukh, Sagalee, Yachuli, Ziro-Hapoli, Palin, Nyapin, Tali, Koloriang, Nacho, Taliha, Daporijo, Raga, Dumporijo, Liromoba, Likabali, Basar, Along West, Along East, Rumgong and Mechuka
- Established: 1977
- Total electors: 5,17,384
- Reservation: None

Member of Parliament
- 18th Lok Sabha
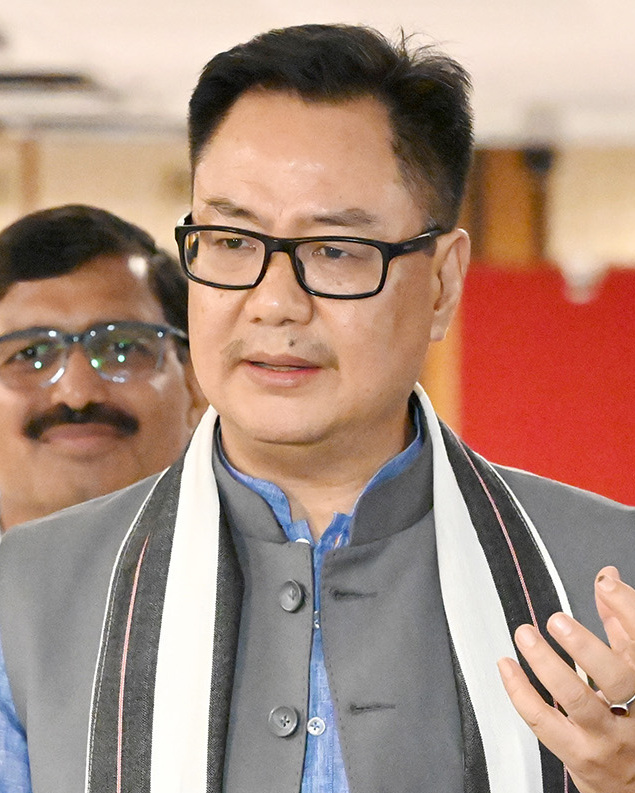
- Incumbent Kiren Rijiju; Union Minister of Parliamentary Affairs; Union Minister of Minority Affairs
- Party: BJP
- Alliance: NDA
- Elected year: 2024

Arunachal West Lok Sabha constituency is one of the two Lok Sabha (lower house of the Indian Parliament) constituencies in Arunachal Pradesh state in northeastern India. This constituency covers the entire Tawang, West Kameng, East Kameng, Papum Pare, Lower Subansiri, Kurung Kumey, Upper Subansiri and West Siang districts.

== Assembly segments ==
Arunachal West Lok Sabha constituency comprises 33 Assembly segments:

#	Name	District	Member	Party	Leading (2024 Lok Sabha)
1	Lumla (ST)	Tawang	Tsering Lhamu	BJP	BJP
2	Tawang (ST)	Tawang	Namgey Tsering	NPP	BJP
3	Mukto (ST)	Tawang	Pema Khandu	BJP	BJP
4	Dirang (ST)	West Kameng	Phurpa Tsering	BJP	BJP
5	Kalaktang (ST)	West Kameng	Tseten Chombay Kee	BJP	BJP
6	Thrizino-Buragaon (ST)	West Kameng	Tenzin Nyima Glow	IND	BJP
7	Bomdila (ST)	West Kameng	Dongru Siongju	BJP	BJP
8	Bameng (ST)	East Kameng	Kumar Waii	INC	BJP
9	Chayangtajo (ST)	East Kameng	Hayeng Mangfi	BJP	BJP
10	Seppa East (ST)	East Kameng	Ealing Tallang	BJP	BJP
11	Seppa West (ST)	East Kameng	Mama Natung	BJP	BJP
12	Pakke-Kessang (ST)	Pakke-Kessang	Biyuram Wahge	BJP	INC
13	Itanagar (ST)	Papum Pare	Techi Kaso	BJP	BJP
14	Doimukh (ST)	Papum Pare	Nabam Vivek	PPA	INC
15	Sagalee (ST)	Papum Pare	Ratu Techi	BJP	BJP
16	Yachuli (ST)	Lower Subansiri	Toko Tatung	NCP	INC
17	Ziro-Hapoli (ST)	Lower Subansiri	Hage Appa	BJP	BJP
18	Palin (ST)	Kra-Daadi	Balo Raja	BJP	BJP
19	Nyapin (ST)	Kurung Kumey	Tai Nikio	BJP	INC
20	Tali (ST)	Kra-Daadi	Jikke Tako	BJP	BJP
21	Koloriang (ST)	Kurung Kumey	Pani Taram	BJP	BJP
22	Nacho (ST)	Upper Subansiri	Nakap Nalo	BJP	BJP
23	Taliha (ST)	Upper Subansiri	Nyato Rigia	BJP	BJP
24	Daporijo (ST)	Upper Subansiri	Taniya Soki	BJP	BJP
25	Raga (ST)	Kamle	Rotom Tebin	BJP	BJP
26	Dumporijo (ST)	Upper Subansiri	Rode Bui	BJP	BJP
27	Liromoba (ST)	West Siang	Pesi Jilen	NPP	BJP
28	Likabali (ST)	Lower Siang	Kardo Nyigyor	BJP	BJP
29	Basar (ST)	Lepa Rada	Nyabi Jini Dirchi	BJP	BJP
30	Along West (ST)	West Siang	Topin Ete	BJP	BJP
31	Along East (ST)	West Siang	Kento Jini	BJP	BJP
32	Rumgong (ST)	Siang district	Talem Taboh	BJP	BJP
33	Mechuka (ST)	Shi Yomi	Pasang Dorjee Sona	BJP	BJP

== Members of Parliament ==
Year	Member	Party
Nominated Members of Parliament to Lok Sabha (1951–1977); Only one member was nominated from Arunachal Pradesh until 1977 elections
1951	Chao Khamoon Gohain	Indian National Congress
1957	Chao Khamoon Gohain	Indian National Congress
1962	Daying Ering	Indian National Congress
1967	Daying Ering	Indian National Congress
1970^	Chao Chandret Gohain	Indian National Congress
1971	Chao Chandret Gohain	Indian National Congress
Arunachal West Lok Sabha Constituency
1977	Rinching Khandu Khrime	Indian National Congress
1980	Prem Khandu Thungan	Indian National Congress (I)
1984	Prem Khandu Thungan	Indian National Congress
1989	Prem Khandu Thungan	Indian National Congress
1991	Prem Khandu Thungan	Indian National Congress
1996	Tomo Riba	Independent
1998	Omak Apang	Arunachal Congress
1999	Jarbom Gamlin	Indian National Congress
2004	Kiren Rijiju	Bharatiya Janata Party
2009	Takam Sanjoy	Indian National Congress
2014	Kiren Rijiju	Bharatiya Janata Party
2019	Kiren Rijiju	Bharatiya Janata Party
2024	Kiren Rijiju	Bharatiya Janata Party

== Election results ==
Vote share of Winning candidates
2024	51.68%
2019	62.02%
2014	50.16%
2009	49.16%
2004	55.95%
1999	55.87%
1998	53.78%
1996	53.25%
1991	71.68%
1989	42.13%
1984	42.91%
1980	42.47%
1977	%

=== 2024 ===
2024 Indian general election: Arunachal West
Party	Candidate	Votes	%	±%
BJP	Kiren Rijiju	205,417	51.68	▼10.34
INC	Nabam Tuki	104,679	26.33	▲12.33
IND	Techi Rana	33,314	8.38	
GSP	Toko Sheetal	30,530	7.68	
IND	Bimpak Siga	11,518	2.90	
IND	Ruhi Tagung	7,821	1.97	
NOTA	None of the Above	2,296	0.58	▲0.06
IND	Leki Norbu	2,271	0.57	
IND	Tania June	1,958	0.49	
Majority		100,738	25.35	▼22.67
Turnout		402,330	77.36	▼1.14
BJP hold		Swing		

=== 2019 ===
2019 Indian general election: Arunachal West
Party	Candidate	Votes	%	±%
BJP	Kiren Rijiju	225,796	62.02	▲11.86
INC	Nabam Tuki	50,953	14.00	▼23.80
JD(S)	Jarjum Ete	43,920	12.06	
NPP	Khyoda Apik	27,119	7.45	
PPA	Subu Kechi	4,766	1.31	▼3.03
AIFB	Jomin Nyokir Kara	1,921	0.53	
IND	Rumak Jomoh	1,946	0.53	
NOTA	None of the Above	1,889	0.52	▼0.02
Majority		174,843	48.02	▲35.66
Turnout		364,047	78.50	▲2.90
BJP hold		Swing		

=== 2014 ===
2014 Indian general election: Arunachal West
Party	Candidate	Votes	%	±%
BJP	Kiren Rijiju	169,367	50.16	▲1.46
INC	Takam Sanjoy	127,629	37.80	▼11.36
PPA	Jalley Sonam	14,664	4.34	
AITC	Gumjum Haider	9,135	2.71	
NCP	Gicho Kabak	6,065	1.80	
AAP	Habung Payeng	3,647	1.08	
IND	Subu Kechi	2,362	0.70	
LB	Taba Taku	980	0.29	▼0.75
NOTA	None of the Above	1,816	0.54	
Majority		41,738	12.36	▲11.90
Turnout		337,671	75.60	▲9.67
BJP gain from INC		Swing		

=== 2009 ===
2009 Indian general election: Arunachal West
Party	Candidate	Votes	%	±%
INC	Takam Sanjoy	140,443	49.16	
BJP	Kiren Rijiju	139,129	48.70	▼7.25
LB	Taba Taku	2,971	1.04	
IND	Subu Kechi	3,167	1.11	
Majority		1,314	0.46	▼20.95
Turnout		285,710	65.93	▲9.74
INC gain from BJP		Swing		

=== 2004 ===
2004 Indian general election: Arunachal West
Party	Candidate	Votes	%	±%
BJP	Kiren Rijiju	123,951	55.95	
AC	Kamen Ringu	76,527	34.54	▲4.47
AITC	Tadar Taniang	6,241	2.82	
SP	Kardu Taipodia	4,901	2.21	
SAP	Kido Ingo	4,896	2.21	
IND	Jodik Tali	3,133	1.41	
IND	Tujo Bagra	1,905	0.86	
Majority		47,424	21.41	▼4.39
Turnout		221,554	56.19	▼14.58
BJP gain from INC		Swing		

=== 1999 ===
1999 Indian general election: Arunachal West
Party	Candidate	Votes	%	±%
INC	Jarbom Gamlin	131,483	55.87	▲25.41
AC	Omak Apang	70,760	30.07	▼23.71
NCP	Toko Kach	33,076	14.06	
Majority		60,723	25.80	▲2.48
Turnout		244,968	70.77	▲10.10
INC gain from AC		Swing		

=== 1998 ===
1998 Indian general election: Arunachal West
Party	Candidate	Votes	%	±%
AC	Omak Apang	104,041	53.78	
INC	Jarbom Gamlin	58,936	30.46	▲0.99
BJP	Tomo Riba	30,487	15.76	▲4.03
Majority		45,105	23.32	▼0.46
Turnout		196,646	60.67	▲6.10
AC gain from Independent		Swing		

=== 1996 ===
1996 Indian general election: Arunachal West
Party	Candidate	Votes	%	±%
IND	Tomo Riba	88,718	53.25	
INC	P. K. Thungon	49,102	29.47	▼42.21
BJP	Mallo Tarin	19,545	11.73	▲8.17
IND	Larbin Nasi	9,226	5.54	
Majority		39,616	23.78	▼23.14
Turnout		169,788	54.57	▲6.62
Independent gain from INC		Swing		

=== 1991 ===
1991 Indian general election: Arunachal West
Party	Candidate	Votes	%	±%
INC	Prem Khandu Thungon	103,249	71.68	▲29.55
JD	Kamen Ringu	35,668	24.76	
BJP	Pura Tado	5,130	3.56	
Majority		67,581	46.92	▲41.76
Turnout		146,948	47.95	▼6.71
INC hold		Swing		

=== 1989 ===
1989 Indian general election: Arunachal West
Party	Candidate	Votes	%	±%
INC	Prem Khandu Thungon	63,247	42.13	▼0.78
PPA	Tomo Riba	55,501	36.97	▼5.59
IND	Nabam Atum	31,368	20.90	
Majority		7,746	5.16	▲4.81
Turnout		154,405	54.66	▼22.06
INC hold		Swing		

=== 1984 ===
1984 Indian general election: Arunachal West
Party	Candidate	Votes	%	±%
INC	P. K. Thungon	56,219	42.91	▲0.44
PPA	Tomo Riba	55,758	42.56	▲4.52
JP	Lokam Tado	9,542	7.28	
IND	Bengia Tolum	9,497	7.25	
Majority		461	0.35	▼4.08
Turnout		140,528	76.72	▲7.74
INC hold		Swing		

=== 1980 ===
1980 Indian general election: Arunachal West
Party	Candidate	Votes	%	±%
INC(I)	Prem Khandu Thungon	41,736	42.47	
PPA	Kuru Hasang	37,381	38.04	
INC(U)	Rinching Khandu Khirme	10,846	11.04	
IND	Mudang Laling	5,844	5.95	
IND	Tem Tai	2,459	2.50	
Majority		4,355	4.43	
Turnout		104,598	68.98	
INC(I) gain from INC		Swing		

=== 1977 ===
1977 Indian general election: Arunachal West
Party	Candidate	Votes	%	±%
INC	Rinchin Khandu Khimre	Unopposed		
Turnout		0	0.00	
INC win (new seat)				

== See also ==
- Arunachal East Lok Sabha constituency
- List of constituencies of the Lok Sabha
