= Liromoba =

Liromoba is a village and the headquarters of Liromoba-Yomcha tehsil in West Siang district in the Indian state of Arunachal Pradesh.

== Civic Administration ==
At a state level, the village is represented in the Arunachal Pradesh Legislative Assembly by the Liromoba (Vidhan Sabha constituency). As of 2019, its representative is Nyamar Karbak of the Bharatiya Janata Party.

In the Lok Sabha, the village is represented by the Arunachal West constituency. Its Member of Parliament is Kiren Rijiju, also of the Bharatiya Janata Party.
