= Daporijo Assembly constituency =

Legislative Assembly constituency in Arunachal Pradesh State, India

Coordinates: 27.99°N 94.22°E

Daporijo
- Constituency No. 24 for the Arunachal Pradesh Legislative Assembly

Constituency details
- Country: India
- Region: Northeast India
- State: Arunachal Pradesh
- District: Upper Subansiri
- Lok Sabha constituency: Arunachal West
- Established: 1978
- Total electors: 17,044
- Reservation: ST

Member of Legislative Assembly
- 11th Arunachal Pradesh Legislative Assembly
- Incumbent Taniya Soki
- Party: Bharatiya Janata Party

Daporijo is one of the 60 Legislative Assembly constituencies of Arunachal Pradesh state in India.

It is part of Upper Subansiri district and is reserved for candidates belonging to the Scheduled Tribes.

== Members of the Legislative Assembly ==
Election	Name	Party
1999	Tadak Dulom	Indian National Congress
2004	Daklo Nidak	Arunachal Congress
2009	Tapen Siga	Bharatiya Janata Party
2014	Dikto Yekar	Indian National Congress
2019	Taniya Soki	Bharatiya Janata Party
2024	Taniya Soki	Bharatiya Janata Party

== Election results ==
=== Assembly Election 2024 ===
2024 Arunachal Pradesh Legislative Assembly election : Daporijo
Party	Candidate	Votes	%	±%
BJP	Taniya Soki	6,671	49.70%	▲1.06
NPP	Dikto Yekar	6,443	48.00%	▲46.58
INC	Reri Kirbe Dulom	267	1.99%	▲0.11
NOTA	None of the Above	41	0.31%	▼0.08
Margin of victory		228	1.70%	▲0.71
Turnout		13,422	78.75%	▲3.79
Registered electors		17,044		▲3.25
BJP hold		Swing	▲1.06	

=== Assembly Election 2019 ===
2019 Arunachal Pradesh Legislative Assembly election : Daporijo
Party	Candidate	Votes	%	±%
BJP	Taniya Soki	6,019	48.65%	▼0.81
JD(U)	Dikto Yekar	5,897	47.66%	New
INC	Togam Tamin	233	1.88%	▼47.87
NPP	Porchu Tamin	176	1.42%	New
NOTA	None of the Above	48	0.39%	▼0.40
Margin of victory		122	0.99%	▲0.69
Turnout		12,373	74.96%	▲0.90
Registered electors		16,507		▼3.12
BJP gain from INC		Swing	▼1.11	

=== Assembly Election 2014 ===
2014 Arunachal Pradesh Legislative Assembly election : Daporijo
Party	Candidate	Votes	%	±%
INC	Dikto Yekar	6,278	49.75%	▲19.94
BJP	Tapen Siga	6,241	49.46%	▲10.22
NOTA	None of the Above	99	0.78%	New
Margin of victory		37	0.29%	▼9.13
Turnout		12,618	74.06%	▼0.36
Registered electors		17,038		▼0.66
INC gain from BJP		Swing		

=== Assembly Election 2009 ===
2009 Arunachal Pradesh Legislative Assembly election : Daporijo
Party	Candidate	Votes	%	±%
BJP	Tapen Siga	5,009	39.24%	▲7.92
INC	Yari Dulom	3,806	29.82%	▼2.57
AITC	Daklo Nidak	2,874	22.52%	New
NCP	Maji Marging	684	5.36%	New
JD(U)	Takir Kurdu	391	3.06%	New
Margin of victory		1,203	9.42%	▲5.53
Turnout		12,764	74.42%	▲14.68
Registered electors		17,152		▲1.80
BJP gain from AC		Swing	▲2.96	

=== Assembly Election 2004 ===
2004 Arunachal Pradesh Legislative Assembly election : Daporijo
Party	Candidate	Votes	%	±%
AC	Daklo Nidak	3,652	36.29%	▼2.06
INC	Yari Dulom	3,260	32.39%	▼29.26
BJP	Tapen Siga	3,152	31.32%	New
Margin of victory		392	3.90%	▼7.07
Turnout		10,064	59.73%	▼21.96
Registered electors		16,848		▲69.51
AC gain from INC		Swing		

=== Assembly Election 1999 ===
1999 Arunachal Pradesh Legislative Assembly election : Daporijo
Party	Candidate	Votes	%	±%
INC	Tadak Dulom	4,116	46.09%	▼2.54
AC	Daklo Nidak	2,439	27.31%	New
Independent	Tapen Siga	2,376	26.60%	New
Margin of victory		1,677	18.78%	▲16.03
Turnout		8,931	62.11%	▼11.62
Registered electors		14,683		▲39.72
INC gain from Independent		Swing		

=== Assembly Election 1995 ===
1995 Arunachal Pradesh Legislative Assembly election : Daporijo
Party	Candidate	Votes	%	±%
Independent	Daklo Nidak	3,911	51.37%	New
INC	Tadak Dulom	3,702	48.63%	▼4.82
Margin of victory		209	2.75%	▼22.26
Turnout		7,613	74.34%	▲10.14
Registered electors		10,509		▼15.22
Independent gain from INC		Swing		

=== Assembly Election 1990 ===
1990 Arunachal Pradesh Legislative Assembly election : Daporijo
Party	Candidate	Votes	%	±%
INC	Tadak Dulom	4,128	53.45%	▲8.49
Independent	Daklo Nidak	2,197	28.45%	New
JD	Tapen Siga	1,398	18.10%	New
Margin of victory		1,931	25.00%	▲24.79
Turnout		7,723	63.16%	▼16.22
Registered electors		12,396		▼5.91
INC hold		Swing		

=== Assembly Election 1984 ===
1984 Arunachal Pradesh Legislative Assembly election : Daporijo
Party	Candidate	Votes	%	±%
INC	Tadak Dulom	4,651	44.96%	New
BJP	Larbin Nachi	4,629	44.75%	New
Independent	Tater Uli	1,064	10.29%	New
Margin of victory		22	0.21%	▼16.15
Turnout		10,344	82.14%	▼2.59
Registered electors		13,174		▲22.14
INC gain from INC(I)		Swing		

=== Assembly Election 1980 ===
1980 Arunachal Pradesh Legislative Assembly election : Daporijo
Party	Candidate	Votes	%	±%
INC(I)	Tadak Dulom	5,077	58.04%	New
PPA	Kebom Nguba	3,646	41.68%	▲0.55
Margin of victory		1,431	16.36%	▼1.38
Turnout		8,748	83.02%	▼4.20
Registered electors		10,786		▲8.75
INC(I) gain from JP		Swing	▼0.83	

=== Assembly Election 1978 ===
1978 Arunachal Pradesh Legislative Assembly election : Daporijo
Party	Candidate	Votes	%	±%
JP	Tadak Dulom	4,981	58.87%	New
PPA	Tabom Nguba	3,480	41.13%	New
Margin of victory		1,501	17.74%	
Turnout		8,461	87.07%	
Registered electors		9,918		
JP win (new seat)				

== See also ==
- List of constituencies of the Arunachal Pradesh Legislative Assembly
- Upper Subansiri district
