= Raga Assembly constituency =

Legislative Assembly constituency in Arunachal Pradesh State, India

Coordinates: 27.8°N 94.07°E

Raga
- Constituency No. 25 for the Arunachal Pradesh Legislative Assembly

Constituency details
- Country: India
- Region: Northeast India
- State: Arunachal Pradesh
- District: Kamle
- Lok Sabha constituency: Arunachal West
- Established: 2008
- Total electors: 16,938
- Reservation: ST

Member of Legislative Assembly
- 11th Arunachal Pradesh Legislative Assembly
- Incumbent Rotom Tebin
- Party: Bharatiya Janata Party

Raga is one of the 60 Legislative Assembly constituencies of Arunachal Pradesh state in India.

It is part of Kamle district and is reserved for candidates belonging to the Scheduled Tribes.

== Members of the Legislative Assembly ==
Election	Member	Party
1990	Talo Mugli	Indian National Congress
1995	Talo Mugli	Indian National Congress
1999	Talo Mugli	Indian National Congress
2004	Nido Pavitra	Independent politician
2009	Nido Pavitra	Indian National Congress
2014	Tamar Murtem	Bharatiya Janata Party
2019	Tarin Dakpe	National People's Party
2024	Rotom Tebin	Bharatiya Janata Party

== Election results ==
=== Assembly Election 2024 ===
2024 Arunachal Pradesh Legislative Assembly election : Raga
Party	Candidate	Votes	%	±%
BJP	Rotom Tebin	8,791	59.91%	▲36.85
NPP	Ajay Murtem	5,857	39.91%	▲13.90
NOTA	None of the Above	26	0.18%	▲0.04
Margin of victory		2,934	19.99%	▲18.72
Turnout		14,674	86.63%	▲2.36
Registered electors		16,938		▲9.69
BJP gain from NPP		Swing	▲33.89	

=== Assembly Election 2019 ===
2019 Arunachal Pradesh Legislative Assembly election : Raga
Party	Candidate	Votes	%	±%
NPP	Tarin Dakpe	3,385	26.01%	New
PPA	Nido Pavitra	3,219	24.74%	New
JD(S)	Takum Kabak	3,189	24.51%	New
BJP	Tamar Murtem	3,001	23.06%	▼26.48
Independent	Maga Teti Pie	117	0.90%	New
INC	Kabak Soping	83	0.64%	▼48.74
NOTA	None of the Above	18	0.14%	▼0.94
Margin of victory		166	1.28%	▲1.11
Turnout		13,012	84.27%	▲1.64
Registered electors		15,441		▼1.25
NPP gain from BJP		Swing	▼23.53	

=== Assembly Election 2014 ===
2014 Arunachal Pradesh Legislative Assembly election : Raga
Party	Candidate	Votes	%	±%
BJP	Tamar Murtem	6,401	49.54%	New
INC	Nido Pavitra	6,380	49.38%	▲8.74
NOTA	None of the Above	139	1.08%	New
Margin of victory		21	0.16%	▼8.67
Turnout		12,920	82.62%	▲8.14
Registered electors		15,637		▼13.31
BJP gain from INC		Swing		

=== Assembly Election 2009 ===
2009 Arunachal Pradesh Legislative Assembly election : Raga
Party	Candidate	Votes	%	±%
INC	Nido Pavitra	5,460	40.64%	▲27.83
NCP	Aath Tacho Kabak	4,274	31.81%	▲12.37
AITC	Talo Mugli	3,700	27.54%	New
Margin of victory		1,186	8.83%	▼2.60
Turnout		13,434	74.48%	▼6.27
Registered electors		18,037		▲35.39
INC gain from Independent		Swing		

=== Assembly Election 2004 ===
2004 Arunachal Pradesh Legislative Assembly election : Raga
Party	Candidate	Votes	%	±%
Independent	Nido Pavitra	4,258	39.58%	New
BJP	Talo Mugli	3,029	28.16%	New
NCP	Kabak Tacho	2,092	19.45%	New
INC	Ligu Tacho	1,378	12.81%	▼48.66
Margin of victory		1,229	11.43%	▼15.89
Turnout		10,757	79.06%	▲10.15
Registered electors		13,322		▲17.05
Independent gain from INC		Swing	▼21.89	

=== Assembly Election 1999 ===
1999 Arunachal Pradesh Legislative Assembly election : Raga
Party	Candidate	Votes	%	±%
INC	Talo Mugli	4,939	61.47%	▼9.84
Independent	Kabak Tacho	2,744	34.15%	New
Independent	Talum Babla	265	3.30%	New
AC	Guchi Tamar	87	1.08%	New
Margin of victory		2,195	27.32%	▼15.30
Turnout		8,035	73.71%	▼9.06
Registered electors		11,381		▲25.60
INC hold		Swing	▼9.84	

=== Assembly Election 1995 ===
1995 Arunachal Pradesh Legislative Assembly election : Raga
Party	Candidate	Votes	%	±%
INC	Talo Mugli	5,147	71.31%	▲18.32
JD	Lonku Tania	2,071	28.69%	▼2.15
Margin of victory		3,076	42.62%	▲20.46
Turnout		7,218	81.68%	▼0.55
Registered electors		9,061		▼7.31
INC hold		Swing		

=== Assembly Election 1990 ===
1990 Arunachal Pradesh Legislative Assembly election : Raga
Party	Candidate	Votes	%	±%
INC	Talo Mugli	4,155	52.99%	New
JD	Boa Tamo	2,418	30.84%	New
Independent	Ratan Tama	862	10.99%	New
JP	Biki Tacho	406	5.18%	New
Margin of victory		1,737	22.15%	
Turnout		7,841	81.90%	
Registered electors		9,776		
INC win (new seat)				

== See also ==
- List of constituencies of the Arunachal Pradesh Legislative Assembly
- Kamle district
