= Liromoba Assembly constituency =

Constituency of the Arunachal Pradesh legislative assembly in India

Coordinates: 28.074°N 94.497°E

Liromoba
- Constituency No. 27 for the Arunachal Pradesh Legislative Assembly

Constituency details
- Country: India
- Region: Northeast India
- State: Arunachal Pradesh
- District: West Siang
- Lok Sabha constituency: Arunachal West
- Established: 1990
- Total electors: 14,004
- Reservation: ST

Member of Legislative Assembly
- 11th Arunachal Pradesh Legislative Assembly
- Incumbent Pesi Jilen
- Party: PPA
- Alliance: NDA
- Elected year: 2024

Liromoba is one of the 60 assembly constituencies of Arunachal Pradesh, a northeastern state of India. It is part of the Arunachal West Lok Sabha constituency.

== Members of the Legislative Assembly ==
Election	Name	Party
1990	Lijum Ronya	Indian National Congress
1995	Lijum Ronya	Indian National Congress
1999	Lijum Ronya	Indian National Congress
2004	Jarbom Gamlin	Indian National Congress
2009	Jarbom Gamlin	Indian National Congress
2014	Jarbom Gamlin	Indian National Congress
2015 By-election	Nyamar Karbak	Indian National Congress
2019	Nyamar Karbak	Bharatiya Janata Party
2024	Pesi Jilen	National People's Party

== Election results ==
=== Assembly Election 2024 ===
2024 Arunachal Pradesh Legislative Assembly election : Liromoba
Party	Candidate	Votes	%	±%
NPP	Pesi Jilen	7,206	56.55%	▲11.28
BJP	Nyamar Karbak	5,508	43.22%	▼8.97
NOTA	None of the Above	29	0.23%	▼0.12
Margin of victory		1,698	13.32%	▲6.39
Turnout		12,743	91.00%	▲3.91
Registered electors		14,004		▲13.35
NPP gain from BJP		Swing	▲4.35	

=== Assembly Election 2019 ===
2019 Arunachal Pradesh Legislative Assembly election : Liromoba
Party	Candidate	Votes	%	±%
BJP	Nyamar Karbak	5,616	52.20%	▲17.00
NPP	Jarpum Gamlin	4,870	45.26%	New
INC	Marjum Karbak	130	1.21%	▼35.12
PPA	Yaba Gadi	106	0.99%	New
NOTA	None of the Above	37	0.34%	New
Margin of victory		746	6.93%	▲5.80
Turnout		10,759	87.08%	▼2.75
Registered electors		12,355		▲5.90
BJP gain from INC		Swing	▲15.87	

=== Assembly By-election 2015 ===
2015 Arunachal Pradesh Legislative Assembly by-election : Liromoba
Party	Candidate	Votes	%	±%
INC	Nyamar Karbak	3,808	36.33%	▼19.42
BJP	Bai Gadi	3,689	35.20%	▼7.29
Independent	Lijum Ronya	2,589	24.70%	New
Independent	Raksap Yomcha	355	3.39%	New
Margin of victory		119	1.14%	▼12.12
Turnout		10,481	89.91%	▲5.32
Registered electors		11,667		▲0.26
INC hold		Swing	▼19.42	

=== Assembly Election 2014 ===
2014 Arunachal Pradesh Legislative Assembly election : Liromoba
Party	Candidate	Votes	%	±%
INC	Jarbom Gamlin	5,483	55.75%	▼14.98
BJP	Bai Gaoi	4,179	42.49%	▲13.22
NPF	Johny Tali	135	1.37%	New
NOTA	None of the Above	38	0.39%	New
Margin of victory		1,304	13.26%	▼28.20
Turnout		9,835	84.51%	▲5.27
Registered electors		11,637		▼1.77
INC hold		Swing	▼14.98	

=== Assembly Election 2009 ===
2009 Arunachal Pradesh Legislative Assembly election : Liromoba
Party	Candidate	Votes	%	±%
INC	Jarbom Gamlin	6,640	70.73%	▲19.03
BJP	Bai Gadi	2,748	29.27%	▲27.52
Margin of victory		3,892	41.46%	▲36.30
Turnout		9,388	79.24%	▼3.52
Registered electors		11,847		▲15.11
INC hold		Swing		

=== Assembly Election 2004 ===
2004 Arunachal Pradesh Legislative Assembly election : Liromoba
Party	Candidate	Votes	%	±%
INC	Jarbom Gamlin	4,404	51.70%	▼8.70
Independent	Lijum Ronya	3,965	46.55%	New
BJP	Dr. James Mitum Boje	149	1.75%	New
Margin of victory		439	5.15%	▼15.64
Turnout		8,518	79.80%	▲1.88
Registered electors		10,292		▲16.49
INC hold		Swing		

=== Assembly Election 1999 ===
1999 Arunachal Pradesh Legislative Assembly election : Liromoba
Party	Candidate	Votes	%	±%
INC	Lijum Ronya	4,316	60.40%	▼2.99
AC	Gegong Apang	2,830	39.60%	New
Margin of victory		1,486	20.79%	▼7.13
Turnout		7,146	81.78%	▼2.68
Registered electors		8,835		▲31.22
INC hold		Swing		

=== Assembly Election 1995 ===
1995 Arunachal Pradesh Legislative Assembly election : Liromoba
Party	Candidate	Votes	%	±%
INC	Lijum Ronya	3,566	63.38%	▲10.93
Independent	Libi Yomgam	1,995	35.46%	New
BJP	Tumto Kamgo	65	1.16%	New
Margin of victory		1,571	27.92%	▲23.01
Turnout		5,626	84.42%	▲6.14
Registered electors		6,733		▼14.39
INC hold		Swing		

=== Assembly Election 1990 ===
1990 Arunachal Pradesh Legislative Assembly election : Liromoba
Party	Candidate	Votes	%	±%
INC	Lijum Ronya	3,194	52.46%	New
JD	Jarbom Gamlin	2,895	47.54%	New
Margin of victory		299	4.91%	
Turnout		6,089	78.74%	
Registered electors		7,865		
INC win (new seat)				

== See also ==
- Liromoba
- West Siang district
- List of constituencies of Arunachal Pradesh Legislative Assembly
