= Along West Assembly constituency =

Constituency of the Arunachal Pradesh legislative assembly in India

Coordinates: 27.14°N 93.61°E

Along West
- Constituency No. 30 for the Arunachal Pradesh Legislative Assembly

Constituency details
- Country: India
- Region: Northeast India
- State: Arunachal Pradesh
- District: West Siang
- Lok Sabha constituency: Arunachal West
- Established: 1990
- Total electors: 14,811
- Reservation: ST

Member of Legislative Assembly
- 11th Arunachal Pradesh Legislative Assembly
- Incumbent Tumke Bagra
- Party: Bharatiya Janata Party
- Elected year: 2019

Along West is one of the 60 assembly constituencies of Arunachal Pradesh, a northeastern state of India. It is part of Arunachal West Lok Sabha constituency.

== Members of the Legislative Assembly ==
Year	Member	Party
1990	Kirge Eshi	Janata Dal
1995	Kento Ete	Indian National Congress
1999	Kento Ete	Indian National Congress
2004	Gadam Ete	Indian National Congress
2009	Gadam Ete	Indian National Congress
2014	Tumke Bagra	Bharatiya Janata Party
2019	Tumke Bagra	Bharatiya Janata Party
2024	Topin Ete	Bharatiya Janata Party

== Election results ==
=== Assembly Election 2024 ===
2024 Arunachal Pradesh Legislative Assembly election: Along West
Party	Candidate	Votes	%	±%
BJP	Topin Ete	7,629	57.10%	▲5.61
NPP	Nyamo Ete	5,678	42.50%	New
Margin of victory		1,951	14.60%	▲6.31
Turnout		13,361	90.21%	▲2.36
Registered electors		14,811		▲11.65
BJP hold		Swing	▲5.61	

=== Assembly Election 2019 ===
2019 Arunachal Pradesh Legislative Assembly election: Along West
Party	Candidate	Votes	%	±%
BJP	Tumke Bagra	6,000	51.48%	▼10.43
JD(U)	Topin Ete	5,034	43.20%	New
JD(S)	Nyadar Loya	385	3.30%	New
INC	Yaman Bagra	172	1.48%	▼35.08
NOTA	Nota	63	0.54%	New
Margin of victory		966	8.29%	▼17.08
Turnout		11,654	87.85%	▲2.29
Registered electors		13,266		▲11.34
BJP hold		Swing	▼10.43	

=== Assembly Election 2014 ===
2014 Arunachal Pradesh Legislative Assembly election: Along West
Party	Candidate	Votes	%	±%
BJP	Tumke Bagra	6,312	61.92%	New
INC	Gadam Ete	3,726	36.55%	▼13.60
NPF	Geli Ete	124	1.22%	New
Margin of victory		2,586	25.37%	▲25.06
Turnout		10,194	85.56%	▼0.85
Registered electors		11,915		▲0.98
BJP gain from INC		Swing		

=== Assembly Election 2009 ===
2009 Arunachal Pradesh Legislative Assembly election: Along West
Party	Candidate	Votes	%	±%
INC	Gadam Ete	5,113	50.15%	▲1.81
AITC	Duter Padu	5,082	49.85%	New
Margin of victory		31	0.30%	▼3.27
Turnout		10,195	86.41%	▲5.05
Registered electors		11,799		▲18.19
INC hold		Swing		

=== Assembly Election 2004 ===
2004 Arunachal Pradesh Legislative Assembly election: Along West
Party	Candidate	Votes	%	±%
INC	Gadam Ete	3,926	48.34%	▼17.03
Independent	Jumbi Bagra	3,636	44.77%	New
BJP	Ige Ete	529	6.51%	New
Margin of victory		290	3.57%	▼27.17
Turnout		8,122	84.79%	▲0.22
Registered electors		9,983		▲13.94
INC hold		Swing		

=== Assembly Election 1999 ===
1999 Arunachal Pradesh Legislative Assembly election: Along West
Party	Candidate	Votes	%	±%
INC	Kento Ete	4,647	65.37%	▲17.98
AC	Kirge Eshi	2,462	34.63%	New
Margin of victory		2,185	30.74%	▲15.75
Turnout		7,109	82.14%	▼6.79
Registered electors		8,762		▲18.31
INC hold		Swing		

=== Assembly Election 1995 ===
1995 Arunachal Pradesh Legislative Assembly election: Along West
Party	Candidate	Votes	%	±%
INC	Kento Ete	3,086	47.39%	▲1.33
JD	Kirge Eshi	2,110	32.40%	▼21.54
Independent	Moji Bagra	1,316	20.21%	New
Margin of victory		976	14.99%	▲7.11
Turnout		6,512	88.77%	▲10.39
Registered electors		7,406		▼6.50
INC gain from JD		Swing		

=== Assembly Election 1990 ===
1990 Arunachal Pradesh Legislative Assembly election: Along West
Party	Candidate	Votes	%	±%
JD	Kirge Eshi	3,313	53.94%	New
INC	Kento Ete	2,829	46.06%	New
Margin of victory		484	7.88%	
Turnout		6,142	78.74%	
Registered electors		7,921		
JD win (new seat)				

== See also ==
- Along West
- West Siang district
- List of constituencies of Arunachal Pradesh Legislative Assembly
