= Chayangtajo Assembly constituency =

Legislative Assembly constituency in Arunachal Pradesh State, India

Coordinates: 27.68°N 93.14°E

Chayangtajo
- Constituency No. 9 for the Arunachal Pradesh Legislative Assembly

Constituency details
- Country: India
- Region: Northeast India
- State: Arunachal Pradesh
- District: East Kameng
- Lok Sabha constituency: Arunachal West
- Established: 1978
- Total electors: 13,873
- Reservation: ST

Member of Legislative Assembly
- 11th Arunachal Pradesh Legislative Assembly
- Incumbent Hayeng Mangfi
- Party: Bharatiya Janata Party

Chayangtajo is one of the 60 Legislative Assembly constituencies of Arunachal Pradesh state in India.

It is part of East Kameng district and is reserved for candidates belonging to the Scheduled Tribes.

== Members of the Legislative Assembly ==
Election	Name	Party
1978	Kameng Dolo	Janata Party
1980	Kameng Dolo	Independent politician
1984	Kameng Dolo	Indian National Congress
1990	Kameng Dolo	Indian National Congress
1995	Kameng Dolo	Indian National Congress
1999	Kameng Dolo	Indian National Congress
2004	Kameng Dolo	Bharatiya Janata Party
2009	Karya Bagang	All India Trinamool Congress
2014	Karya Bagang	Indian National Congress
2019	Hayeng Mangfi	Bharatiya Janata Party
2024	Hayeng Mangfi	Bharatiya Janata Party

== Election results ==
=== Assembly Election 2024 ===
2024 Arunachal Pradesh Legislative Assembly election: Chayangtajo
Party	Candidate	Votes	%	±%
BJP	Hayeng Mangfi	8,809	80.35%	▲34.01
INC	Kompu Dolo	2,124	19.37%	▲18.58
NOTA	None of the Above	30	0.27%	▼0.14
Margin of victory		6,685	60.98%	▲54.86
Turnout		10,963	79.02%	▼8.20
Registered electors		13,873		▲16.80
BJP gain from JD(U)		Swing	▲27.90	

=== Assembly Election 2019 ===
2019 Arunachal Pradesh Legislative Assembly election: Chayangtajo
Party	Candidate	Votes	%	±%
JD(U)	Hayeng Mangfi	5,435	52.46%	New
BJP	Laching Kacha Yangfo	4,801	46.34%	▲2.12
INC	Joro Doka	82	0.79%	▼48.09
NOTA	None of the Above	43	0.42%	▼0.46
Margin of victory		634	6.12%	▲1.45
Turnout		10,361	87.23%	▼2.40
Registered electors		11,878		▲19.83
JD(U) gain from INC		Swing	▲3.57	

=== Assembly Election 2014 ===
2014 Arunachal Pradesh Legislative Assembly election: Chayangtajo
Party	Candidate	Votes	%	±%
INC	Karya Bagang	4,343	48.89%	▲1.33
BJP	Laching Kacha Yangfo	3,928	44.21%	New
PPA	Jabring Venia	535	6.02%	New
NOTA	None of the Above	78	0.88%	New
Margin of victory		415	4.67%	▼0.21
Turnout		8,884	89.63%	▲6.18
Registered electors		9,912		▲18.06
INC gain from AITC		Swing	▼3.56	

=== Assembly Election 2009 ===
2009 Arunachal Pradesh Legislative Assembly election: Chayangtajo
Party	Candidate	Votes	%	±%
AITC	Karya Bagang	3,674	52.44%	New
INC	Kameng Dolo	3,332	47.56%	▲2.24
Margin of victory		342	4.88%	▼4.49
Turnout		7,006	83.44%	▲17.70
Registered electors		8,396		▼25.80
AITC gain from BJP		Swing		

=== Assembly Election 2004 ===
2004 Arunachal Pradesh Legislative Assembly election: Chayangtajo
Party	Candidate	Votes	%	±%
BJP	Kameng Dolo	4,068	54.68%	New
INC	Tara Bagang	3,371	45.32%	▼14.63
Margin of victory		697	9.37%	▼11.57
Turnout		7,439	64.01%	▲5.03
Registered electors		11,315		▲15.38
BJP gain from INC		Swing		

=== Assembly Election 1999 ===
1999 Arunachal Pradesh Legislative Assembly election: Chayangtajo
Party	Candidate	Votes	%	±%
INC	Kameng Dolo	3,569	59.94%	▲5.11
AC	Sama Yangfo	2,322	39.00%	New
Independent	Rajo Cheda	63	1.06%	New
Margin of victory		1,247	20.94%	▲11.27
Turnout		5,954	65.00%	▼14.33
Registered electors		9,807		▲4.84
INC hold		Swing		

=== Assembly Election 1995 ===
1995 Arunachal Pradesh Legislative Assembly election: Chayangtajo
Party	Candidate	Votes	%	±%
INC	Kameng Dolo	3,849	54.84%	▲4.70
JD	Tame Phassang	3,170	45.16%	▼4.70
Margin of victory		679	9.67%	▲9.39
Turnout		7,019	78.32%	▲2.23
Registered electors		9,354		▲1.51
INC hold		Swing		

=== Assembly Election 1990 ===
1990 Arunachal Pradesh Legislative Assembly election: Chayangtajo
Party	Candidate	Votes	%	±%
INC	Kameng Dolo	3,364	50.14%	▼3.91
JD	Ropo Yangfo	3,345	49.86%	New
Margin of victory		19	0.28%	▼7.82
Turnout		6,709	75.42%	▼5.48
Registered electors		9,215		▼17.80
INC hold		Swing		

=== Assembly Election 1984 ===
1984 Arunachal Pradesh Legislative Assembly election: Chayangtajo
Party	Candidate	Votes	%	±%
INC	Kameng Dolo	4,744	54.05%	New
Independent	Mai Sonam	4,033	45.95%	New
Margin of victory		711	8.10%	▲7.46
Turnout		8,777	84.36%	▲24.52
Registered electors		11,211		▲11.04
INC gain from Independent		Swing		

=== Assembly Election 1980 ===
1980 Arunachal Pradesh Legislative Assembly election: Chayangtajo
Party	Candidate	Votes	%	±%
Independent	Kameng Dolo	1,894	34.89%	New
PPA	Tame Yangfo	1,859	34.24%	▼8.25
INC(U)	Lukup Sono Yangfo	872	16.06%	New
INC(I)	Donglo Sonam	804	14.81%	New
Margin of victory		35	0.64%	▼14.38
Turnout		5,429	58.43%	▼7.45
Registered electors		10,096		▲4.68
Independent gain from JP		Swing	▼22.62	

=== Assembly Election 1978 ===
1978 Arunachal Pradesh Legislative Assembly election: Chayangtajo
Party	Candidate	Votes	%	±%
JP	Kameng Dolo	3,396	57.51%	New
PPA	Tame Yangfo	2,509	42.49%	New
Margin of victory		887	15.02%	
Turnout		5,905	64.33%	
Registered electors		9,645		
JP win (new seat)				

== See also ==
- List of constituencies of the Arunachal Pradesh Legislative Assembly
- East Kameng district
