= Tamar Murtem =

Indian politician

Member of the Arunachal Pradesh Legislative Assembly
- In office 2014–2019
- Preceded by: Nido Pavitra
- Succeeded by: Tarin Dakpe
- Constituency: Raga

Personal details
- Party: BJP

Tamar Murtem is an Indian politician from the state of Arunachal Pradesh.

He was elected from the Raga constituency in the 2014 Arunachal Pradesh Legislative Assembly election, standing as a BJP candidate.

== See also ==
- Arunachal Pradesh Legislative Assembly
