= Basar Assembly constituency =

Legislative Assembly constituency in Arunachal Pradesh State, India

Coordinates: 27.98°N 94.69°E

Basar
- Constituency No. 29 for the Arunachal Pradesh Legislative Assembly

Constituency details
- Country: India
- Region: Northeast India
- State: Arunachal Pradesh
- District: Lepa Rada
- Lok Sabha constituency: Arunachal West
- Established: 1978
- Total electors: 19,208
- Reservation: ST

Member of Legislative Assembly
- 11th Arunachal Pradesh Legislative Assembly
- Incumbent Gokar Basar
- Party: National People's Party (India)

Basar is one of the 60 Legislative Assembly constituencies of Arunachal Pradesh state in India.

It is part of Lepa Rada district and is reserved for candidates belonging to the Scheduled Tribes.

== Members of the Legislative Assembly ==
Election	Member	Party
1978	Tomo Riba	People's Party of Arunachal
1980	Tomo Riba	People's Party of Arunachal
1984	Todak Basar	Indian National Congress
1990	Todak Basar	Indian National Congress
1995	Tomo Riba	Independent politician
1999	Eken Riba	Indian National Congress
2004	Gojen Gadi	Independent politician
2009	Gojen Gadi	Indian National Congress
2014	Gojen Gadi	Indian National Congress
2019	Gokar Basar	National People's Party
2024	Nyabi Jini Dirchi	Bharatiya Janata Party

== Election results ==
=== Assembly Election 2024 ===
2024 Arunachal Pradesh Legislative Assembly election: Basar
Party	Candidate	Votes	%	±%
BJP	Nyabi Jini Dirchi	9,174	55.26%	▲7.43
NPP	Gokar Basar	7,383	44.47%	▼5.16
NOTA	None of the Above	44	0.27%	▼0.06
Margin of victory		1,791	10.79%	▲8.99
Turnout		16,601	86.43%	▲10.00
Registered electors		19,208		▲9.97
BJP gain from NPP		Swing	▲5.63	

=== Assembly Election 2019 ===
2019 Arunachal Pradesh Legislative Assembly election: Basar
Party	Candidate	Votes	%	±%
NPP	Gokar Basar	6,626	49.63%	New
BJP	Gojen Gadi	6,386	47.84%	New
INC	Marpin Basar	205	1.54%	▼54.91
Independent	Togo Basar	90	0.67%	New
NOTA	None of the Above	43	0.32%	New
Margin of victory		240	1.80%	▼12.29
Turnout		13,350	76.43%	▼1.63
Registered electors		17,467		▲6.81
NPP gain from INC		Swing	▼6.81	

=== Assembly Election 2014 ===
2014 Arunachal Pradesh Legislative Assembly election: Basar
Party	Candidate	Votes	%	±%
INC	Gojen Gadi	7,206	56.45%	▼4.42
PPA	Togo Basar	5,407	42.35%	New
NOTA	None of the Above	153	1.20%	New
Margin of victory		1,799	14.09%	▼8.42
Turnout		12,766	78.06%	▼3.96
Registered electors		16,354		▼3.25
INC hold		Swing		

=== Assembly Election 2009 ===
2009 Arunachal Pradesh Legislative Assembly election: Basar
Party	Candidate	Votes	%	±%
INC	Gojen Gadi	8,438	60.86%	▲25.24
AITC	Dakter Basar	5,317	38.35%	New
NCP	Yomkar Riba	109	0.79%	New
Margin of victory		3,121	22.51%	▼6.24
Turnout		13,864	82.02%	▲9.17
Registered electors		16,904		▲2.22
INC gain from Independent		Swing		

=== Assembly Election 2004 ===
2004 Arunachal Pradesh Legislative Assembly election: Basar
Party	Candidate	Votes	%	±%
Independent	Gojen Gadi	7,755	64.38%	New
INC	Eken Riba	4,291	35.62%	▼1.05
Margin of victory		3,464	28.76%	▲24.97
Turnout		12,046	71.06%	▲1.11
Registered electors		16,537		▲15.71
Independent gain from INC		Swing		

=== Assembly Election 1999 ===
1999 Arunachal Pradesh Legislative Assembly election: Basar
Party	Candidate	Votes	%	±%
INC	Eken Riba	3,760	36.68%	▼8.07
Independent	Gojen Gadi	3,372	32.89%	New
AC	Jobom Basar	1,959	19.11%	New
Independent	Gokar Lombi	1,161	11.32%	New
Margin of victory		388	3.78%	▼4.20
Turnout		10,252	74.41%	▼9.92
Registered electors		14,292		▲19.75
INC gain from Independent		Swing	▼16.05	

=== Assembly Election 1995 ===
1995 Arunachal Pradesh Legislative Assembly election: Basar
Party	Candidate	Votes	%	±%
Independent	Tomo Riba	5,138	52.72%	New
INC	Gojen Gadi	4,360	44.74%	▼16.16
BJP	Dotum Sora	247	2.53%	New
Margin of victory		778	7.98%	▼13.82
Turnout		9,745	82.71%	▲4.17
Registered electors		11,935		▼5.65
Independent gain from INC		Swing		

=== Assembly Election 1990 ===
1990 Arunachal Pradesh Legislative Assembly election: Basar
Party	Candidate	Votes	%	±%
INC	Todak Basar	5,969	60.90%	▼3.07
JD	Tomo Riba	3,832	39.10%	New
Margin of victory		2,137	21.80%	▼6.14
Turnout		9,801	78.66%	▼3.87
Registered electors		12,650		▲15.46
INC hold		Swing		

=== Assembly Election 1984 ===
1984 Arunachal Pradesh Legislative Assembly election: Basar
Party	Candidate	Votes	%	±%
INC	Todak Basar	5,701	63.97%	New
PPA	Tamar Karlo	3,211	36.03%	▼15.46
Margin of victory		2,490	27.94%	▲22.65
Turnout		8,912	84.26%	▼3.09
Registered electors		10,956		▲21.72
INC gain from PPA		Swing		

=== Assembly Election 1980 ===
1980 Arunachal Pradesh Legislative Assembly election: Basar
Party	Candidate	Votes	%	±%
PPA	Tomo Riba	3,913	51.49%	▼8.45
INC(I)	Todak Basar	3,511	46.20%	New
INC(U)	Tahum Taipodia	176	2.32%	New
Margin of victory		402	5.29%	▼14.58
Turnout		7,600	86.30%	▼2.82
Registered electors		9,001		▲14.56
PPA hold		Swing	▼8.45	

=== Assembly Election 1978 ===
1978 Arunachal Pradesh Legislative Assembly election: Basar
Party	Candidate	Votes	%	±%
PPA	Tomo Riba	4,109	59.93%	New
JP	Tadak Basar	2,747	40.07%	New
Margin of victory		1,362	19.87%	
Turnout		6,856	89.26%	
Registered electors		7,857		
PPA win (new seat)				

== See also ==
- List of constituencies of the Arunachal Pradesh Legislative Assembly
- Lepa Rada district
