= Dorjee Wangdi Kharma =

Indian politician

Member of the Arunachal Pradesh Legislative Assembly
- In office 2019–2024
- Preceded by: Tenzing Norbu Thongdok
- Succeeded by: Tseten Chombay Kee
- Constituency: Kalaktang

Personal details
- Born: 1963 (age 62–63)
- Party: Bharatiya Janata Party
- Other political affiliations: Janata Dal (United)
- Profession: Politician

Dorjee Wangdi Kharma is an Indian politician who served as a member of 10th Arunachal Pradesh Assembly from the Kalaktang Assembly constituency. In the 2019 Arunachal Pradesh Legislative Assembly election, he defeated Tenzing Norbu Thongdok by a margin of 1,772 votes. In December 2020, he switched to the Bharatiya Janata Party from Janata Dal (United).
