= Kalaktang Assembly constituency =

Legislative Assembly constituency in Arunachal Pradesh State, India

Coordinates: 27.1°N 92.11°E

Kalaktang
- Constituency No. 5 for the Arunachal Pradesh Legislative Assembly

Constituency details
- Country: India
- Region: Northeast India
- State: Arunachal Pradesh
- District: West Kameng
- Lok Sabha constituency: Arunachal West
- Established: 1990
- Total electors: 10,992
- Reservation: ST

Member of Legislative Assembly
- 11th Arunachal Pradesh Legislative Assembly
- Incumbent Tseten Chombay Kee
- Party: Bharatiya Janata Party

Kalaktang is one of the 60 Legislative Assembly constituencies of Arunachal Pradesh state in India.

It is part of West Kameng district and is reserved for candidates belonging to the Scheduled Tribes.

== Members of the Legislative Assembly ==
Election	Name	Party
1990	Rinchin Khandu Khrimey	Indian National Congress
1995	Rinchin Khandu Khrimey	Indian National Congress
1999	D. K. Thongdok	Indian National Congress
2004	Rinchin Khandu Khrimey	Independent politician
2009	Tenzing Norbu Thongdok	Indian National Congress
2014	Tenzing Norbu Thongdok	Indian National Congress
2019	Dorjee Wangdi Kharma	Janata Dal
2024	Tseten Chombay Kee	Bharatiya Janata Party

== Election results ==
=== Assembly Election 2024 ===
2024 Arunachal Pradesh Legislative Assembly election : Kalaktang
Party	Candidate	Votes	%	±%
BJP	Tseten Chombay Kee	6,030	65.03%	▲26.26
NCP	Wangdi Dorjee Khrimey	3,161	34.09%	New
NOTA	None of the Above	82	0.88%	▼0.46
Margin of victory		2,869	30.94%	▲9.83
Turnout		9,273	84.36%	▼2.73
Registered electors		10,992		▲14.06
BJP gain from JD(U)		Swing	▲5.14	

=== Assembly Election 2019 ===
Arunachal Pradesh Legislative Assembly Election, 2019: Kalaktang
Party	Candidate	Votes	%	±%
JD(U)	Dorjee Wangdi Kharma	5,026	59.88%	New
BJP	Tenzing Norbu Thongdok	3,254	38.77%	▲33.75
NOTA	None of the Above	113	1.35%	▲0.64
Margin of victory		1,772	21.11%	▲12.21
Turnout		8,393	87.09%	▲0.08
Registered electors		9,637		▲5.25
JD(U) gain from INC		Swing	▲8.30	

=== Assembly Election 2014 ===
2014 Arunachal Pradesh Legislative Assembly election : Kalaktang
Party	Candidate	Votes	%	±%
INC	Tenzing Norbu Thongdok	4,110	51.59%	▼7.02
PPA	Tsering Sonam	3,401	42.69%	New
BJP	Dorjee Khandu Thongon	400	5.02%	New
NOTA	None of the Above	56	0.70%	New
Margin of victory		709	8.90%	▼8.32
Turnout		7,967	87.01%	▲8.66
Registered electors		9,156		▲0.37
INC hold		Swing	▼7.02	

=== Assembly Election 2009 ===
2009 Arunachal Pradesh Legislative Assembly election : Kalaktang
Party	Candidate	Votes	%	±%
INC	Tenzing Norbu Thongdok	4,189	58.61%	▲14.16
NCP	Rinchin Khandu Khrimey	2,958	41.39%	New
Margin of victory		1,231	17.22%	▲6.13
Turnout		7,147	78.35%	▲12.14
Registered electors		9,122		▲6.54
INC gain from Independent		Swing		

=== Assembly Election 2004 ===
2004 Arunachal Pradesh Legislative Assembly election : Kalaktang
Party	Candidate	Votes	%	±%
Independent	Rinchin Khandu Khrimey	3,149	55.55%	New
INC	D. K. Thongdok	2,520	44.45%	▲0.77
Margin of victory		629	11.10%	▲6.59
Turnout		5,669	64.30%	▼0.70
Registered electors		8,562		▼4.85
Independent gain from INC		Swing		

=== Assembly Election 1999 ===
1999 Arunachal Pradesh Legislative Assembly election : Kalaktang
Party	Candidate	Votes	%	±%
INC	D. K. Thongdok	2,630	43.68%	▼17.48
BJP	Rinchin Khandu Khrimey	2,359	39.18%	▲0.34
Independent	Leiki Wangchuk	1,032	17.14%	New
Margin of victory		271	4.50%	▼17.82
Turnout		6,021	69.28%	▼10.44
Registered electors		8,998		▲4.58
INC hold		Swing		

=== Assembly Election 1995 ===
1995 Arunachal Pradesh Legislative Assembly election : Kalaktang
Party	Candidate	Votes	%	±%
INC	Rinchin Khandu Khrimey	4,071	61.16%	▼4.51
BJP	Nima Tsering Khrime	2,585	38.84%	New
Margin of victory		1,486	22.33%	▼9.02
Turnout		6,656	79.49%	▼1.67
Registered electors		8,604		▲31.80
INC hold		Swing		

=== Assembly Election 1990 ===
1990 Arunachal Pradesh Legislative Assembly election : Kalaktang
Party	Candidate	Votes	%	±%
INC	Rinchin Khandu Khrimey	3,388	65.67%	New
JD	Dorjee Tsering	1,771	34.33%	New
Margin of victory		1,617	31.34%	
Turnout		5,159	80.10%	
Registered electors		6,528		
INC win (new seat)				

== See also ==
- List of constituencies of the Arunachal Pradesh Legislative Assembly
- West Kameng district
