= Along East Assembly constituency =

Legislative Assembly constituency in Arunachal Pradesh State, India

Coordinates: 28.21°N 95°E

Along East
- Constituency No. 31 for the Arunachal Pradesh Legislative Assembly

Constituency details
- Country: India
- Region: Northeast India
- State: Arunachal Pradesh
- District: West Siang
- Lok Sabha constituency: Arunachal West
- Established: 1990
- Total electors: 14,490
- Reservation: ST

Member of Legislative Assembly
- 11th Arunachal Pradesh Legislative Assembly
- Incumbent Kento Jini
- Party: Bharatiya Janata Party

Along East is one of the 60 Legislative Assembly constituencies of Arunachal Pradesh state in India.

It comprises Along town, and a few of its surrounding villages, in West Siang district, and is reserved for candidates belonging to the Scheduled Tribes.

== Members of the Legislative Assembly ==
Election	Member	Party
1990	Doi Ado	Indian National Congress
1995	Doi Ado	Indian National Congress
1999	Kito Sora	Indian National Congress
2004	Kito Sora	Indian National Congress
2009	Jarkar Gamlin	Indian National Congress
2014	Jarkar Gamlin	Indian National Congress
2019	Kento Jini	Bharatiya Janata Party
2024	Kento Jini	Bharatiya Janata Party

== Election results ==
=== Assembly Election 2024 ===
2024 Arunachal Pradesh Legislative Assembly election: Along East
Party	Candidate	Votes	%	±%
BJP	Kento Jini	7,380	63.39%	New
PPA	Jarkar Gamlin	4,222	36.27%	New
Margin of victory		3,158	27.13%	
Turnout		11,642	80.35%	▲80.35
Registered electors		14,490		▲8.77
BJP hold		Swing		

=== Assembly Election 2019 ===
2019 Arunachal Pradesh Legislative Assembly election: Along East
Party	Candidate	Votes	%	±%
BJP	Kento Jini	Unopposed		
Registered electors		13,322		▲7.57
BJP gain from INC		Swing		

=== Assembly Election 2014 ===
2014 Arunachal Pradesh Legislative Assembly election: Along East
Party	Candidate	Votes	%	±%
INC	Jarkar Gamlin	4,409	44.54%	▼8.54
NCP	Tummar Bagra	3,477	35.12%	New
BJP	Yomto Jini	1,947	19.67%	New
Margin of victory		932	9.41%	▲3.27
Turnout		9,900	79.94%	▲6.34
Registered electors		12,384		▼6.53
INC hold		Swing		

=== Assembly Election 2009 ===
2009 Arunachal Pradesh Legislative Assembly election: Along East
Party	Candidate	Votes	%	±%
INC	Jarkar Gamlin	5,175	53.07%	▼0.31
AITC	Yomto Jini	4,576	46.93%	New
Margin of victory		599	6.14%	▼1.58
Turnout		9,751	73.60%	▲1.79
Registered electors		13,249		▲10.30
INC hold		Swing		

=== Assembly Election 2004 ===
2004 Arunachal Pradesh Legislative Assembly election: Along East
Party	Candidate	Votes	%	±%
INC	Kito Sora	4,604	53.38%	▲12.31
BJP	Yomto Jini	3,938	45.66%	New
Independent	Tujo Bagra	83	0.96%	New
Margin of victory		666	7.72%	▲0.19
Turnout		8,625	69.18%	▲0.81
Registered electors		12,012		▲16.41
INC hold		Swing		

=== Assembly Election 1999 ===
1999 Arunachal Pradesh Legislative Assembly election: Along East
Party	Candidate	Votes	%	±%
INC	Kito Sora	3,009	41.07%	▲3.74
NCP	Gumli Lollen	2,457	33.54%	New
AC	Doi Ado	1,860	25.39%	New
Margin of victory		552	7.53%	▲2.85
Turnout		7,326	72.53%	▼5.69
Registered electors		10,319		▲4.93
INC hold		Swing		

=== Assembly Election 1995 ===
1995 Arunachal Pradesh Legislative Assembly election: Along East
Party	Candidate	Votes	%	±%
INC	Doi Ado	2,815	37.33%	▼16.64
Independent	Gumli Lollen	2,462	32.65%	New
JD	Dagmo Jini	1,463	19.40%	▼26.63
BJP	Kido Ingo	801	10.62%	New
Margin of victory		353	4.68%	▼3.26
Turnout		7,541	77.82%	▲15.72
Registered electors		9,834		▼1.84
INC hold		Swing	▼16.64	

=== Assembly Election 1990 ===
1990 Arunachal Pradesh Legislative Assembly election: Along East
Party	Candidate	Votes	%	±%
INC	Doi Ado	3,296	53.97%	New
JD	Togum Lollen	2,811	46.03%	New
Margin of victory		485	7.94%	
Turnout		6,107	62.14%	
Registered electors		10,018		
INC win (new seat)				

== See also ==
- List of constituencies of the Arunachal Pradesh Legislative Assembly
- West Siang district
