= Kento Jini =

Indian politician

Member of Arunachal Pradesh Legislative Assembly
- Incumbent
- Assumed office 2019
- Preceded by: Jarkar Gamlin
- Constituency: Along East

Personal details
- Party: Bharatiya Janata Party

Kento Jini is an Indian politician from Arunachal Pradesh belonging to the Bharatiya Janata Party. He is a member of the Legislative Assembly in the 11th Arunachal Pradesh Legislative Assembly, representing the Along East constituency. He won over PPA's candidate Jarkar Gamlin, securing 7380 votes.

== Education ==
He graduated with a LLB from University Law College, Gauhati University in 2000.
