= Seppa West Assembly constituency =

Legislative Assembly constituency in Arunachal Pradesh, India

Coordinates: 27.361°N 93.028°E

Seppa West
- Constituency No. 11 for the Arunachal Pradesh Legislative Assembly

Constituency details
- Country: India
- Region: Northeast India
- State: Arunachal Pradesh
- District: West Kameng
- Lok Sabha constituency: Arunachal West
- Established: 1990
- Total electors: 8,408
- Reservation: ST

Member of Legislative Assembly
- 11th Arunachal Pradesh Legislative Assembly
- Incumbent Mama Natung
- Party: Bharatiya Janata Party
- Elected year: 2024

Seppa West is one of the 60 constituencies of Legislative Assembly of Arunachal Pradesh. Name of current MLA (August 2016) of this constituency is Mama Natung. It is located in West Kameng district.

== Members of the Legislative Assembly ==
Year	Member	Party
Seppa Assembly constituency (1978-1990)
1978	Donglo Sonam	Janata Party
1980	Nyari Welly	People's Party of Arunachal
1984	Nyari Welly	Indian National Congress
Seppa West Assembly Constituency(1990 till date)
1990	Hari Natung	Independent
1995	Hari Natung	Indian National Congress
1999	Hari Natung	Indian National Congress
2004	Tani Loffa	Bharatiya Janata Party
2009	Tani Loffa	Trinamool Congress
2014	Mama Natung	Indian National Congress
2019	Mama Natung	Bharatiya Janata Party
2024	Mama Natung	Bharatiya Janata Party

== Election results ==
=== Assembly Election 2024 ===
2024 Arunachal Pradesh Legislative Assembly election : Seppa West
Party	Candidate	Votes	%	±%
BJP	Mama Natung	4,430	58.14%	▼2.73
NPP	Tani Loffa	3,181	41.75%	New
NOTA	None of the Above	9	0.12%	▼0.65
Margin of victory		1,249	16.39%	▼6.91
Turnout		7,620	90.63%	▼0.84
Registered electors		8,408		▲15.32
BJP hold		Swing	▼2.73	

=== Assembly Election 2019 ===
2019 Arunachal Pradesh Legislative Assembly election : Seppa West
Party	Candidate	Votes	%	±%
BJP	Mama Natung	4,059	60.86%	New
JD(U)	Tani Loffa	2,505	37.56%	New
INC	Sorsomi Degio	54	0.81%	New
NOTA	None of the Above	51	0.76%	New
Margin of victory		1,554	23.30%	
Turnout		6,669	91.47%	▲91.47
Registered electors		7,291		▲16.02
BJP gain from INC		Swing		

=== Assembly Election 2014 ===
2014 Arunachal Pradesh Legislative Assembly election : Seppa West
Party	Candidate	Votes	%	±%
INC	Mama Natung	Unopposed		
Registered electors		6,284		▲13.55
INC gain from AITC		Swing		

=== Assembly Election 2009 ===
2009 Arunachal Pradesh Legislative Assembly election : Seppa West
Party	Candidate	Votes	%	±%
AITC	Tani Loffa	2,783	52.96%	New
INC	Hari Notung	2,472	47.04%	▲3.26
Margin of victory		311	5.92%	▼6.52
Turnout		5,255	94.96%	▲15.67
Registered electors		5,534		▼21.01
AITC gain from BJP		Swing		

=== Assembly Election 2004 ===
2004 Arunachal Pradesh Legislative Assembly election : Seppa West
Party	Candidate	Votes	%	±%
BJP	Tani Loffa	3,123	56.22%	New
INC	Hari Notung	2,432	43.78%	▼13.71
Margin of victory		691	12.44%	▼2.54
Turnout		5,555	77.22%	▲3.46
Registered electors		7,006		▲17.75
BJP gain from INC		Swing		

=== Assembly Election 1999 ===
1999 Arunachal Pradesh Legislative Assembly election : Seppa West
Party	Candidate	Votes	%	±%
INC	Hari Notung	2,594	57.49%	▲21.34
AC	Tani Loffa	1,918	42.51%	New
Margin of victory		676	14.98%	▲8.42
Turnout		4,512	78.64%	▼6.63
Registered electors		5,950		▲9.50
INC hold		Swing		

=== Assembly Election 1995 ===
1995 Arunachal Pradesh Legislative Assembly election : Seppa West
Party	Candidate	Votes	%	±%
INC	Hari Notung	1,620	36.15%	▲13.09
JD	Rachob Taba	1,326	29.59%	▼2.13
JP	Sorsomi Degio	804	17.94%	New
BJP	Aja Natung	731	16.31%	New
Margin of victory		294	6.56%	▼6.93
Turnout		4,481	85.87%	▼0.74
Registered electors		5,434		▲13.56
INC gain from Independent		Swing	▼9.06	

=== Assembly Election 1990 ===
1990 Arunachal Pradesh Legislative Assembly election : Seppa West
Party	Candidate	Votes	%	±%
Independent	Hari Natung	1,800	45.21%	New
JD	Matum Rime	1,263	31.73%	New
INC	Dera Degio	918	23.06%	New
Margin of victory		537	13.49%	
Turnout		3,981	85.52%	
Registered electors		4,785		
Independent win (new seat)				

== See also ==
- List of constituencies of Arunachal Pradesh Legislative Assembly
- Arunachal Pradesh Legislative Assembly
- Tani Loffa
