= Seppa East Assembly constituency =

Legislative Assembly constituency in Arunachal Pradesh State, India

Coordinates: 27.361°N 93.052°E

Seppa East
- Constituency No. 10 for the Arunachal Pradesh Legislative Assembly

Constituency details
- Country: India
- Region: Northeast India
- State: Arunachal Pradesh
- District: East Kameng
- Lok Sabha constituency: Arunachal West
- Established: 1990
- Total electors: 12,461
- Reservation: ST

Member of Legislative Assembly
- 11th Arunachal Pradesh Legislative Assembly
- Incumbent Ealing Tallang
- Party: Bharatiya Janata Party

Seppa East is one of the 60 Legislative Assembly constituencies of Arunachal Pradesh state in India. It is part of East Kameng district and is reserved for candidates belonging to the Scheduled Tribes. Its current representative is Tapuk Taku, of the National People's Party.

Most Successful parties from Tezpur Vidhan Sabha
1. Indian National Congress (2 Times) (52.0%)
2. Bharatiya Janata Party (1 Time) (30.0%)
3. Janata Party (1 Time) (6.00%)
4. Nationalist Congress Party (1 Time) (6.00%)
5. Janata Dal (1 Time) (6.00%)
6. 0.00%
7. 0.00%
8. 0.00%

== Members of the Legislative Assembly ==
Election	Name	Party
1990	Mepe Dada	Janata Dal
1995	Bida Tako	Janata Party
1999	Atum Welly	Nationalist Congress Party
2004	Atum Welly	Indian National Congress
2009	Tapuk Taku	All India Trinamool Congress
2014	Tapuk Taku	Indian National Congress
2019	Tapuk Taku	National People's Party
2024	Ealing Tallang	Bharatiya Janata Party

== Election results ==
=== Assembly Election 2024 ===
2024 Arunachal Pradesh Legislative Assembly election : Seppa East
Party	Candidate	Votes	%	±%
BJP	Ealing Tallang	7,412	79.95%	▲30.47
INC	Tame Gyadi	1,812	19.54%	New
NOTA	None of the Above	47	0.51%	▼0.18
Margin of victory		5,600	60.40%	▲60.06
Turnout		9,271	74.40%	▼6.90
Registered electors		12,461		▲20.65
BJP gain from NPP		Swing	▲30.12	

=== Assembly Election 2019 ===
2019 Arunachal Pradesh Legislative Assembly election : Seppa East
Party	Candidate	Votes	%	±%
NPP	Tapuk Taku	4,184	49.83%	New
BJP	Ealing Tallang	4,155	49.48%	▲18.38
NOTA	None of the Above	58	0.69%	▼0.72
Margin of victory		29	0.35%	▼36.04
Turnout		8,397	81.30%	▲11.27
Registered electors		10,328		▼4.92
NPP gain from INC		Swing	▼17.66	

=== Assembly Election 2014 ===
2014 Arunachal Pradesh Legislative Assembly election : Seppa East
Party	Candidate	Votes	%	±%
INC	Tapuk Taku	5,134	67.49%	▲19.11
BJP	Lelung Lingfa	2,366	31.10%	New
NOTA	None of the Above	107	1.41%	New
Margin of victory		2,768	36.39%	▲33.16
Turnout		7,607	70.03%	▼5.56
Registered electors		10,862		▼9.17
INC gain from AITC		Swing		

=== Assembly Election 2009 ===
2009 Arunachal Pradesh Legislative Assembly election : Seppa East
Party	Candidate	Votes	%	±%
AITC	Tapuk Taku	4,666	51.62%	New
INC	Tame Phassang	4,374	48.38%	▼4.74
Margin of victory		292	3.23%	▼3.01
Turnout		9,040	75.59%	▲22.23
Registered electors		11,959		▼13.94
AITC gain from INC		Swing		

=== Assembly Election 2004 ===
2004 Arunachal Pradesh Legislative Assembly election : Seppa East
Party	Candidate	Votes	%	±%
INC	Atum Welly	3,939	53.12%	▲6.36
Independent	Tame Phassang	3,476	46.88%	New
Margin of victory		463	6.24%	▼0.24
Turnout		7,415	50.52%	▼4.54
Registered electors		13,896		▲22.71
INC gain from NCP		Swing		

=== Assembly Election 1999 ===
1999 Arunachal Pradesh Legislative Assembly election : Seppa East
Party	Candidate	Votes	%	±%
NCP	Atum Welly	3,491	53.24%	New
INC	Bida Tako	3,066	46.76%	▲22.01
Margin of victory		425	6.48%	▼9.71
Turnout		6,557	60.53%	▼14.77
Registered electors		11,324		▲17.85
NCP gain from JP		Swing		

=== Assembly Election 1995 ===
1995 Arunachal Pradesh Legislative Assembly election : Seppa East
Party	Candidate	Votes	%	±%
JP	Bida Tako	3,193	45.73%	New
JD	Atum Welly	2,062	29.53%	▼21.69
INC	Mepe Dada	1,728	24.75%	▼22.41
Margin of victory		1,131	16.20%	▲12.14
Turnout		6,983	76.49%	▲3.15
Registered electors		9,609		▲39.02
JP gain from JD		Swing		

=== Assembly Election 1990 ===
1990 Arunachal Pradesh Legislative Assembly election : Seppa East
Party	Candidate	Votes	%	±%
JD	Mepe Dada	2,461	51.22%	New
INC	Atum Welly	2,266	47.16%	New
Independent	Takar Taku	78	1.62%	New
Margin of victory		195	4.06%	
Turnout		4,805	74.22%	
Registered electors		6,912		
JD win (new seat)				

== See also ==
- List of constituencies of the Arunachal Pradesh Legislative Assembly
- West Siang district
- Arunachal Pradesh Legislative Assembly
