= Takam Sanjoy =

Indian politician

Shri Takam Sanjoy

Member of Parliament for Arunachal (West)
- In office 1 June 2009 – 26 May 2014
- Preceded by: Kiren Rijiju
- Succeeded by: Kiren Rijiju

President of Arunachal Pradesh Congress Committee
- In office 14 March 2017 – 31 July 2019
- Preceded by: Padi Richo
- Succeeded by: Nabam Tuki

Personal details
- Born: 15 May 1967 (age 59) Sangram, Kurung Kumey, North-East Frontier Agency
- Party: Indian National Congress
- Spouse(s): Smt. Takam Moni; Married on 15 May 1993
- Children: 3 sons and 3 daughters
- Education: Don Bosco Technical School; Rajiv Gandhi University, Itanagar
- Profession: Political and social worker
- Father: Takam Tapuk
- Mother: Takam Yalling
- Lok Sabha committee memberships: External Affairs, Government Assurances

Takam Sanjoy (born 15 May 1967) is an Indian politician and Member of Parliament belonging to the Indian National Congress. In the 2009 general election he was elected to the 15th Lok Sabha, the lower house of the Parliament of India from the Arunachal West constituency of Arunachal Pradesh.

He also served as the President of the Arunachal Pradesh Football Association till 2019.

== Youth politics and political career ==
He was an active member of NSUI, associated mostly in students' movements in Arunachal Pradesh and North East. He was involved in the emancipation of women in Arunachal Pradesh and in the workers' movement and education for tribal boys and girls. In 1994, he was elected for the first time to the Arunachal Pradesh Legislative Assembly. As a cabinet minister, he fought for the separation of judiciary and executive. The Land Settlement Bill for Arunachal Pradesh was legislated as Land Management Minister.

Positions held:
General Secretary, Arunachal Students' Union, Shillong, 1990–91
General Secretary, All Nyishi Students' Union
General Secretary (1988) and President, All Arunachal Pradesh Students' Union (AAPSU)1992-94
Founding Member, North East Students' Organisation (NESO)
General Secretary, Students' Welfare Association, Palin Chamgang (SWAPCA), 1988–90
Advisor to State NSUI Arunachal Pradesh, 1999–2003
Honorary Secretary INTUC, Arunachal Pradesh Unit, 1997

== Political positions held ==
1994-99 and 1999-2004 - Member, Arunachal Pradesh Legislative Assembly
1995 - chairman, Committee on Government Assurance, Member, Estimated Committee, Rules Committee and House Committee
1998-1999 - Minister, Law, Legislative and Justice, Govt. of Arunachal Pradesh
1999 - Minister, Personnel and Administrative Reform, Govt. of Arunachal Pradesh
1999-2002 - Minister IPR and P & Land Management, Govt. of Arunachal Pradesh
2002 - General Secretary, Arunachal Pradesh Congress Committee (APCC)
April 2002- July 2003 - Minister, Education, Govt. of Arunachal Pradesh
2004-2005 - Working President, Arunachal Pradesh Congress Committee
2006 to date - General Secretary, North East Congress Coordination Committee (NECCC)
2007- March 2009 - Adviser to Chief Minister of Arunachal Pradesh
2008 to date - Vice President, Arunachal Pradesh Congress Committee
2009 - Elected to 15th Lok Sabha
31 August 2009 - Member, Committee on External Affairs
23 September 2009 - Member, Committee on Government Assurances
