= Taba Tedir =

Indian politician

Taba Tedir is a Bharatiya Janata Party politician from Arunachal Pradesh. He was first elected in the 2019 Arunachal Pradesh Legislative Assembly election from the Yachuli constituency as a candidate of the Bharatiya Janata Party. He served as minister of Education and Cultural Affairs and the Indigenous Affairs in the Second Pema Khandu ministry from 2019 to 2024.

He lost in the 2024 Arunachal Pradesh Legislative Assembly election to Toko Tatung.
