= Hayeng Mangfi =

Indian politician

Member of the Arunachal Pradesh Legislative Assembly for Chayangtajo
- Incumbent
- Assumed office 11 April 2019
- Preceded by: Karya Bagang (INC)
- Majority: 634(2019)

Personal details
- Born: Hayeng Mangfi
- Party: Janata Dal (United) (JD (U)) (‍–‍?) Bharatiya Janata Party (BJP)
- Occupation: Politician

Hayang Mangfi is an Indian politician who has served as a member of the Arunachal Pradesh Legislative Assembly since 2019.

== Election results ==
Arunachal Pradesh Legislative Assembly
Year	Constituency	Candidate	Votes	Pct	Opponent(s)	Votes	Pct	Ballots cast	Majority
2019	No.9 Chayangtajo	Hayeng Mangfi (JD (U))	5,435	52.46%	Laching Kacha Yangfo (BJP)	4,801	46.34%	10,931	634
2019	No.9 Chayangtajo	Hayeng Mangfi (JD (U))	5,435	52.46%	Joro Doka (INC)	82	0.79%	10,931	634
2019	No.9 Chayangtajo	Hayeng Mangfi (JD (U))	5,435	52.46%	None of the above	43	0.42%	10,931	634
