= Yachuli Assembly constituency =

Legislative Assembly constituency in Arunachal Pradesh State, India

Coordinates: 27.51°N 93.78°E

Yachuli
- Constituency No. 16 for the Arunachal Pradesh Legislative Assembly

Constituency details
- Country: India
- Region: Northeast India
- State: Arunachal Pradesh
- District: Keyi Panyor
- Lok Sabha constituency: Arunachal West
- Established: 2008
- Total electors: 17,521
- Reservation: ST

Member of Legislative Assembly
- 11th Arunachal Pradesh Legislative Assembly
- Incumbent Toko Tatung
- Party: NCP
- Alliance: NDA
- Elected year: 2024

Yachuli is one of the 60 Legislative Assembly constituencies of Arunachal Pradesh state in India.

It is part of Keyi Panyor district and is reserved for candidates belonging to the Scheduled Tribes. As of 2019, it is represented by Taba Tedir of the Bharatiya Janata Party.

== Members of the Legislative Assembly ==
Election	Member	Party
1990	Neelam Taram	Indian National Congress
1995	Neelam Taram	Indian National Congress
1999	Jotom Toko Takam	Nationalist Congress Party
2004	Nikh Kamin	Nationalist Congress Party
2009	Likha Saaya	Indian National Congress
2014	Likha Saaya	Indian National Congress
2019	Taba Tedir	Bharatiya Janata Party
2024	Toko Tatung	Nationalist Congress Party

== Election results ==
=== Assembly Election 2024 ===
2024 Arunachal Pradesh Legislative Assembly election : Yachuli
Party	Candidate	Votes	%	±%
NCP	Toko Tatung	8,255	50.57%	New
BJP	Taba Tedir	8,027	49.17%	New
NOTA	None of the Above	42	0.26%	New
Margin of victory		228	1.40%	
Turnout		16,324	93.17%	▲93.17
Registered electors		17,521		▲9.67
NCP gain from BJP		Swing		

=== Assembly Election 2019 ===
2019 Arunachal Pradesh Legislative Assembly election : Yachuli
Party	Candidate	Votes	%	±%
BJP	Taba Tedir	Unopposed		
Registered electors		15,976		▲5.31
BJP gain from INC		Swing		

=== Assembly Election 2014 ===
2014 Arunachal Pradesh Legislative Assembly election : Yachuli
Party	Candidate	Votes	%	±%
INC	Likha Saaya	6,685	47.96%	▲6.38
NCP	Taba Nirmali	6,615	47.46%	New
BJP	Debiatara	569	4.08%	New
NOTA	None of the Above	69	0.50%	New
Margin of victory		70	0.50%	▲0.19
Turnout		13,938	91.87%	▲9.52
Registered electors		15,171		▼7.85
INC hold		Swing	▲6.38	

=== Assembly Election 2009 ===
2009 Arunachal Pradesh Legislative Assembly election : Yachuli
Party	Candidate	Votes	%	±%
INC	Likha Saaya	5,638	41.58%	▼3.21
AITC	Nikh Kamin	5,596	41.27%	New
PPA	Jotam Toko Takam	2,324	17.14%	New
Margin of victory		42	0.31%	▼9.28
Turnout		13,558	82.35%	▲0.97
Registered electors		16,463		▲17.70
INC gain from NCP		Swing		

=== Assembly Election 2004 ===
2004 Arunachal Pradesh Legislative Assembly election : Yachuli
Party	Candidate	Votes	%	±%
NCP	Nikh Kamin	6,191	54.39%	▲10.81
INC	Likha Maj	5,099	44.79%	▲6.45
BJP	Talla Joram	93	0.82%	New
Margin of victory		1,092	9.59%	▲4.36
Turnout		11,383	80.80%	▲3.76
Registered electors		13,987		▲23.99
NCP hold		Swing		

=== Assembly Election 1999 ===
1999 Arunachal Pradesh Legislative Assembly election : Yachuli
Party	Candidate	Votes	%	±%
NCP	Jotom Toko Takam	3,816	43.58%	New
INC	Neelam Taram	3,358	38.35%	▼40.69
AC	Nikh Kamin	1,583	18.08%	New
Margin of victory		458	5.23%	▼52.84
Turnout		8,757	79.75%	▲0.15
Registered electors		11,281		▲16.43
NCP gain from INC		Swing		

=== Assembly Election 1995 ===
1995 Arunachal Pradesh Legislative Assembly election : Yachuli
Party	Candidate	Votes	%	±%
INC	Neelam Taram	5,933	79.03%	▲1.96
JD	Bida Taba Goyee	1,574	20.97%	▼1.96
Margin of victory		4,359	58.07%	▲3.93
Turnout		7,507	79.37%	▲3.29
Registered electors		9,689		▼2.53
INC hold		Swing		

=== Assembly Election 1990 ===
1990 Arunachal Pradesh Legislative Assembly election : Yachuli
Party	Candidate	Votes	%	±%
INC	Neelam Taram	5,683	77.07%	New
JD	Joram Tajing	1,691	22.93%	New
Margin of victory		3,992	54.14%	
Turnout		7,374	75.67%	
Registered electors		9,940		
INC win (new seat)				

== See also ==
- List of constituencies of the Arunachal Pradesh Legislative Assembly
- Lower Subansiri district
