= Ealing Tallang =

Member of Arunachal Pradesh Legislative Assembly
- Incumbent
- Assumed office 1 June 2024
- Preceded by: Tapuk Taku
- Constituency: Seppa East

Personal details
- Political party: Bharatiya Janata Party

Ealing Tallang is an Indian politician from Arunachal Pradesh belonging to the Bharatiya Janata Party. He is a member of the Legislative Assembly in the 11th Arunachal Pradesh Legislative Assembly. He won over INC's candidate Tame Gyadi, getting 5600 votes.

== Education ==
He graduated from Dera Natung Government College with a Bachelor of Arts.
