= Nyato Rigia =

Member of Arunachal Pradesh Legislative Assembly
- Incumbent
- Assumed office 2019
- Preceded by: Punji Mara
- Constituency: Taliha
- In office 1999–2009
- Preceded by: Punji Mara
- Succeeded by: Punji Mara

Personal details
- Party: Bharatiya Janata Party
- Other political affiliations: Indian National Congress

Nyato Rigia is an Indian politician from Arunachal Pradesh belonging to the Bharatiya Janata Party. He is a three-time member of the Arunachal Pradesh Legislative Assembly. He won the 2024 Arunachal Pradesh Legislative Assembly election unopposed.

== Education ==
He graduated from Jawaharlal Nehru College with a Bachelor of Arts degree in 1986.
