= Thrizino-Buragaon Assembly constituency =

Legislative Assembly constituency in Arunachal Pradesh, India

Coordinates: 27.286°N 92.665°E

Thrizino-Buragaon
- Constituency No. 6 for the Arunachal Pradesh Legislative Assembly

Constituency details
- Country: India
- Region: Northeast India
- State: Arunachal Pradesh
- District: West Kameng
- Lok Sabha constituency: Arunachal West
- Established: 1990
- Total electors: 14,717
- Reservation: ST

Member of Legislative Assembly
- 11th Arunachal Pradesh Legislative Assembly
- Incumbent Tenzin Nyima Glow
- Party: Independent Politician
- Elected year: 2024

Thrizino-Buragaon is one of the 60 constituencies of Legislative Assembly of Arunachal Pradesh. West Kameng is the name of the district that contains Thrizino-Buragaon.

== Members of the Legislative Assembly ==
Election	Member	Party
1990	Sinam Dususow	Indian National Congress
1995	Naresh Glow	Independent politician
1999	Naresh Glow	Indian National Congress
2004	Naresh Glow	Indian National Congress
2009	Kumsi Sidisow	People's Party of Arunachal
2014	Kumsi Sidisow	Indian National Congress
2019	Kumsi Sidisow	Bharatiya Janata Party
2024	Tenzin Nyima Glow	Independent politician

== Election results ==
=== Assembly Election 2024 ===
2024 Arunachal Pradesh Legislative Assembly election : Thrizino-Buragaon
Party	Candidate	Votes	%	±%
Independent	Tenzin Nyima Glow	5,593	51.36%	New
BJP	Kumsi Sidisow	5,193	47.69%	▼35.60
NOTA	None of the Above	104	0.96%	▼0.22
Margin of victory		400	3.67%	▼64.07
Turnout		10,890	74.00%	▼6.01
Registered electors		14,717		▲11.78
Independent gain from BJP		Swing	▼31.92	

=== Assembly Election 2019 ===
2019 Arunachal Pradesh Legislative Assembly election : Thrizino-Buragaon
Party	Candidate	Votes	%	±%
BJP	Kumsi Sidisow	8,772	83.28%	▲57.73
INC	Kalo Dususow	1,637	15.54%	▼56.57
NOTA	None of the Above	124	1.18%	▼1.16
Margin of victory		7,135	67.74%	▲21.18
Turnout		10,533	80.00%	▲2.41
Registered electors		13,166		▼6.43
BJP gain from INC		Swing	▲11.17	

=== Assembly Election 2014 ===
2014 Arunachal Pradesh Legislative Assembly election : Thrizino-Buragaon
Party	Candidate	Votes	%	±%
INC	Kumsi Sidisow	7,873	72.11%	▲43.73
BJP	Gandhi Sakrinsow	2,790	25.55%	New
NOTA	None of the Above	255	2.34%	New
Margin of victory		5,083	46.56%	▲3.32
Turnout		10,918	77.59%	▼0.87
Registered electors		14,071		▼4.50
INC gain from PPA		Swing		

=== Assembly Election 2009 ===
2009 Arunachal Pradesh Legislative Assembly election : Thrizino-Buragaon
Party	Candidate	Votes	%	±%
PPA	Kumsi Sidisow	8,279	71.62%	New
INC	Naresh Glow	3,281	28.38%	▼21.97
Margin of victory		4,998	43.24%	▲42.53
Turnout		11,560	78.46%	▲12.11
Registered electors		14,734		▲46.24
PPA gain from INC		Swing		

=== Assembly Election 2004 ===
2004 Arunachal Pradesh Legislative Assembly election : Thrizino-Buragaon
Party	Candidate	Votes	%	±%
INC	Naresh Glow	3,366	50.35%	▼0.22
BJP	Govardhan Nimasow	3,319	49.65%	New
Margin of victory		47	0.70%	▼0.43
Turnout		6,685	65.15%	▼5.40
Registered electors		10,075		▲9.65
INC hold		Swing		

=== Assembly Election 1999 ===
1999 Arunachal Pradesh Legislative Assembly election : Thrizino-Buragaon
Party	Candidate	Votes	%	±%
INC	Naresh Glow	3,334	50.57%	▲24.21
AC	Govardhon Nimasow	3,259	49.43%	New
Margin of victory		75	1.14%	▼14.55
Turnout		6,593	74.44%	▼7.70
Registered electors		9,188		▲23.11
INC gain from Independent		Swing		

=== Assembly Election 1995 ===
1995 Arunachal Pradesh Legislative Assembly election : Thrizino-Buragaon
Party	Candidate	Votes	%	±%
Independent	Naresh Glow	2,493	42.04%	New
INC	Sinam Dususow	1,563	26.36%	▼34.67
Independent	Govardhon Nimasow	1,508	25.43%	New
Independent	Pangku	263	4.44%	New
JD	Miali	103	1.74%	New
Margin of victory		930	15.68%	▼6.38
Turnout		5,930	81.50%	▲4.23
Registered electors		7,463		▲32.91
Independent gain from INC		Swing	▼18.99	

=== Assembly Election 1990 ===
1990 Arunachal Pradesh Legislative Assembly election : Thrizino-Buragaon
Party	Candidate	Votes	%	±%
INC	Sinam Dususow	2,578	61.03%	New
Independent	Nima Tsering Khrime	1,646	38.97%	New
Margin of victory		932	22.06%	
Turnout		4,224	77.42%	
Registered electors		5,615		
INC win (new seat)				

== See also ==
- List of constituencies of Arunachal Pradesh Legislative Assembly
- Arunachal Pradesh Legislative Assembly
