= Tanga Byaling =

Indian politician

Tanga Byaling is an Indian politician from the state of Arunachal Pradesh.

Taram was elected unopposed from the Nacho constituency in the 2014 Arunachal Pradesh Legislative Assembly election, standing as a People's Party of Arunachal candidate.

== See also ==
- Arunachal Pradesh Legislative Assembly
