= Topin Ete =

Indian politician

Member of Arunachal Pradesh Legislative Assembly
- Incumbent
- Assumed office 1 June 2024
- Preceded by: Tumke Bagra
- Constituency: Along West

Personal details
- Party: Bharatiya Janata Party

Topin Ete is an Indian politician from Arunachal Pradesh belonging to the Bharatiya Janata Party. He is a member of the 11th Arunachal Pradesh Legislative Assembly representing the Along West constituency, having defeated the NPP candidate Nyamo Ete with 1951 votes.

== Education ==
He graduated with a LLB from Campus Law Centre, University of Delhi in 1999.
