= Ministry of Minority Affairs =

Government ministry of India

- Branch of Government of India

- Ministry of Minority Affairs

Agency overview
- Formed: 29 January 2006
- Jurisdiction: Government of India
- Headquarters: New Delhi 110084
- Annual budget: ₹3,400 crore (US$350 million) (2026-27 est.) including National Commission for Minorities
- Minister responsible: Kiren Rijiju, Minister of Minority Affairs
- Deputy Minister responsible: Minister of State
- Child agency: National Commission for Minorities
- Website: www.minorityaffairs.gov.in

The Ministry of Minority Affairs is the ministry in the Government of India which was carved out of the Ministry of Social Justice and Empowerment and created on 29 January 2006. It is the apex body for the central government's regulatory and developmental programmes for the minority religious communities and minority linguistic communities in India, which include Muslims, Sikhs, Christians, Buddhists, Zoroastrians (Parsis) and Jains notified as minority religious communities in The Gazette of India under Section 2(c) of the National Commission for Minorities Act, 1992.

The current minister is Kiren Rijiju who has been in office since 10 June 2024

== Allocation of Business ==
- PM-JVK (Jan Vikas Karyakaram)
- Direct Benefit Transfer
- Vigilance
- National Wakf Development Corporation
- Education Empowerment
- Closure Cell
- Madarsa
- Establishment
- PM-VIKAS (Virasat Ka Samvardhan)
- National Minorities Development and Finance Corporation
- Information Technology
- General Administration
- Commissioner for Linguistic Minorities
- National Commission for Minorities
- Haj
- Wakf
- Capacity Building Commission
- Reservation matters
- Dargah
- Special Campaign for Disposal of Pending Matters
- Amrut Mahotsav
- Maulana Azad Education Foundation, Maulana Azad National Academy of Skills
- Parliament

== Character ==
The ministry is also involved with the linguistic minorities and of the office of the Commissioner for Linguistic Minorities, representation of the Anglo-Indian community, protection and preservation of non-Muslim shrines in Pakistan and Muslim shrines in India in terms of the Pant-Mirza Agreement of 1955, in consultation with the Ministry of External Affairs. The Minister in charge is also Chairperson of the Central Wakf Council, India, which manages the running of the State Wakf Boards. Ministry of Minority Affairs provides Moma scholarship to minority community students of India every year. Moma Scholarship is a scholarship scheme of the Ministry of Minority Affairs initiated with the aim of supporting minority communities student who is not financially strong and wants to pursue higher studies in India. Minority communities in India includes Muslims, Sikhs, Christians, Buddhists, Parsis and Jains. The scholarship is awarded to the students by India Government through State Government/UTs. The scholarship is awarded for the undergraduate and postgraduate courses.

Linguistic Minorities, according to Indian Constitution should have a Special Officer appointed.

Constitutional Article: 350B.

1. There shall be a Special Officer for linguistic minorities to be appointed by the President.
2. It shall be the duty of the Special Officer to investigate all matters relating to the safeguards provided for linguistic minorities under this Constitution and report to the President upon those matters at such intervals as the President may direct, and the President shall cause all such reports to be laid before each House of Parliament, and sent to the Governments of the States concerned.

It is to be decided based on states as the states have been formed on linguistic basis.

== Cabinet Ministers ==
The Minister of Minority Affairs is the head of the Ministry of Minority Affairs and one of the cabinet ministers of the Government of India.

- Note: MoS, I/C – Minister of State with Independent Charge

Portrait	Minister (Birth-Death) Constituency	Term of office			Political party	Ministry	Prime Minister
Portrait	Minister (Birth-Death) Constituency	From	To	Period	Political party	Ministry	Prime Minister
	A. R. Antulay (1929–2014); MP for Kolaba	29 January 2006	22 May 2009	3 years, 113 days	Indian National Congress	Manmohan I	Manmohan Singh
	Salman Khurshid (born 1953); MP for Farrukhabad (Minister of State, I/C until 19 Jan 2011)	28 May 2009	28 October 2012	3 years, 153 days	Indian National Congress	Manmohan II	Manmohan Singh
	K. Rahman Khan (born 1939); MP for Karnataka (Rajya Sabha)	28 October 2012	26 May 2014	1 year, 210 days	Indian National Congress	Manmohan II	Manmohan Singh
	Najma Heptulla (born 1940); Rajya Sabha MP for Madhya Pradesh	26 May 2014	12 July 2016	2 years, 47 days	Bharatiya Janata Party	Modi I	Narendra Modi
	Mukhtar Abbas Naqvi (born 1957); Rajya Sabha MP for Jharkhand (Minister of State, I/C until 3 Sep 2017)	12 July 2016	6 July 2022	5 years, 359 days	Bharatiya Janata Party	Modi I	Narendra Modi
	Mukhtar Abbas Naqvi (born 1957); Rajya Sabha MP for Jharkhand (Minister of State, I/C until 3 Sep 2017)	12 July 2016	6 July 2022	5 years, 359 days	Bharatiya Janata Party	Modi II	Narendra Modi
	Smriti Irani (born 1976); MP for Amethi	6 July 2022	9 June 2024	1 year, 339 days	Bharatiya Janata Party	Modi II	Narendra Modi
	Kiren Rijiju (born 1971); MP for Arunachal West	10 June 2024	Incumbent	2 years, 126 days	Bharatiya Janata Party	Modi III	Narendra Modi

== Ministers of State ==
Portrait	Minister (Birth-Death) Constituency	Term of office			Political party	Ministry	Prime Minister
Portrait	Minister (Birth-Death) Constituency	From	To	Period	Political party	Ministry	Prime Minister
	Vincent Pala (born 1968); MP for Shillong	19 January 2011	28 October 2012	1 year, 283 days	Indian National Congress	Manmohan II	Manmohan Singh
	Ninong Ering (born 1959); MP for Arunachal East	28 October 2012	26 May 2014	1 year, 210 days	Indian National Congress	Manmohan II	Manmohan Singh
	Mukhtar Abbas Naqvi (born 1957); Rajya Sabha MP for Uttar Pradesh, till 2016; Rajya Sabha MP for Jharkhand, from 2016	9 November 2014	12 July 2016	1 year, 246 days	Bharatiya Janata Party	Modi I	Narendra Modi
	Virendra Kumar Khatik (born 1954); MP for Tikamgarh	3 September 2017	30 May 2019	1 year, 269 days	Bharatiya Janata Party	Modi I	Narendra Modi
	Kiren Rijiju (born 1971); MP for Arunachal West	31 May 2019	7 July 2021	2 years, 37 days	Bharatiya Janata Party	Modi II	Narendra Modi
	John Barla (born 1975); MP for Alipurduars	7 July 2021	9 June 2024	2 years, 338 days	Bharatiya Janata Party	Modi II	Narendra Modi
	George Kurian (born 1960); Rajya Sabha MP for Madhya Pradesh (Until 21 June 2026)	10 June 2024	23 June 2026	2 years, 13 days	Bharatiya Janata Party	Modi III	Narendra Modi

== Organisations ==
- Constitutional and Statutory Bodies
  - Central Wakf Council (CWC)
  - National Commission for Minorities (NCM)
  - Commissioner for Linguistic Minorities (CLM)
  - Haj Committee of India
- Autonomous Bodies
  - Maulana Azad Education Foundation (MAEF)
- PSUs and Joint Ventures
  - National Minorities Development and Finance Corporation (NMDFC)

== Schemes & Scholarship Programmes ==
- Jiyo Parsi - Scheme for containing population decline of Parsis
- Nai Manzil - An Integrated Education and Livelihood Initiative for the Minority Communities
- Seekho aur Kamao (Learn & Earn) - Scheme for Skill Development of Minorities
- Pre-Matric Scholarship Scheme
- Post-Matric Scholarship Scheme
- Merit-cum-Means Scholarship Scheme
