= Nacho Assembly constituency =

Legislative Assembly constituency in Arunachal Pradesh State, India

Coordinates: 28.41°N 93.82°E

Nacho
- Constituency No. 22 for the Arunachal Pradesh Legislative Assembly

Constituency details
- Country: India
- Region: Northeast India
- State: Arunachal Pradesh
- District: Upper Subansiri
- Lok Sabha constituency: Arunachal West
- Established: 2004
- Total electors: 12,385
- Reservation: ST

Member of Legislative Assembly
- 11th Arunachal Pradesh Legislative Assembly
- Incumbent Nakap Nalo
- Party: Bharatiya Janata Party
- Elected year: 2024

Nacho is one of the 60 Legislative Assembly constituencies of Arunachal Pradesh state in India. It comprises Nacho, Taksing, Limeking and Siyum circles of Upper Subansiri district, and is reserved for candidates belonging to the Scheduled Tribes. As of 2024 it is represented by Nakap Nalo of the Bharatiya Janata Party.

== Members of the Legislative Assembly ==
Election	Member	Party
1990	Tanga Byaling	Independent politician
1995	Tarik Rava	Indian National Congress
1999	Tanga Byaling	Indian National Congress
2004	Tanga Byaling	Indian National Congress
2009	Tanga Byaling	Indian National Congress
2014	Tanga Byaling	Indian National Congress
2019	Nakap Nalo	Bharatiya Janata Party
2024	Nakap Nalo	Bharatiya Janata Party

== Election results ==
=== Assembly Election 2024 ===
2024 Arunachal Pradesh Legislative Assembly election : Nacho
Party	Candidate	Votes	%	±%
BJP	Nakap Nalo	5,415	57.08%	▲3.70
INC	Tanga Byaling	4,042	42.61%	▼3.40
NOTA	None of the Above	29	0.31%	▼0.31
Margin of victory		1,373	14.47%	▲7.10
Turnout		9,486	76.59%	▼9.70
Registered electors		12,385		▲12.90
BJP hold		Swing	▲3.70	

=== Assembly Election 2019 ===
2019 Arunachal Pradesh Legislative Assembly election : Nacho
Party	Candidate	Votes	%	±%
BJP	Nakap Nalo	5,053	53.38%	New
INC	Tanga Byaling	4,355	46.01%	New
NOTA	None of the Above	58	0.61%	New
Margin of victory		698	7.37%	
Turnout		9,466	86.29%	▲86.29
Registered electors		10,970		▲4.49
BJP gain from INC		Swing		

=== Assembly Election 2014 ===
2014 Arunachal Pradesh Legislative Assembly election : Nacho
Party	Candidate	Votes	%	±%
INC	Tanga Byaling	Unopposed		
Registered electors		10,499		▲28.24
INC hold		Swing		

=== Assembly Election 2009 ===
2009 Arunachal Pradesh Legislative Assembly election : Nacho
Party	Candidate	Votes	%	±%
INC	Tanga Byaling	4,878	70.00%	▲18.65
BJP	Ajit Nacho	1,052	15.10%	▲7.41
NCP	Tapa Garam Baki	1,039	14.91%	New
Margin of victory		3,826	54.90%	▲27.67
Turnout		6,969	85.12%	▲10.61
Registered electors		8,187		▼3.18
INC hold		Swing		

=== Assembly Election 2004 ===
2004 Arunachal Pradesh Legislative Assembly election : Nacho
Party	Candidate	Votes	%	±%
INC	Tanga Byaling	3,235	51.34%	▲3.48
Independent	Tarik Rava	1,519	24.11%	New
Independent	Tai Rai	1,063	16.87%	New
BJP	Taring Dui	484	7.68%	▼25.51
Margin of victory		1,716	27.23%	▲12.57
Turnout		6,301	74.52%	▲0.75
Registered electors		8,456		▲12.82
INC hold		Swing	▲3.48	

=== Assembly Election 1999 ===
1999 Arunachal Pradesh Legislative Assembly election : Nacho
Party	Candidate	Votes	%	±%
INC	Tanga Byaling	2,646	47.86%	▲4.99
BJP	Taring Dui	1,835	33.19%	New
NCP	Tai Rai	773	13.98%	New
AC	Tarik Rava	275	4.97%	New
Margin of victory		811	14.67%	▲7.69
Turnout		5,529	77.13%	▼11.11
Registered electors		7,495		▲40.57
INC hold		Swing	▲4.99	

=== Assembly Election 1995 ===
1995 Arunachal Pradesh Legislative Assembly election : Nacho
Party	Candidate	Votes	%	±%
INC	Tarik Rava	1,940	42.86%	▲7.18
JD	Tanga Byaling	1,624	35.88%	▲12.57
Independent	Taring Dui	962	21.25%	New
Margin of victory		316	6.98%	▲1.67
Turnout		4,526	87.36%	▲21.77
Registered electors		5,332		▼40.97
INC gain from Independent		Swing		

=== Assembly Election 1990 ===
1990 Arunachal Pradesh Legislative Assembly election : Nacho
Party	Candidate	Votes	%	±%
Independent	Tanga Byaling	2,337	41.00%	New
INC	Taring Dui	2,034	35.68%	New
JD	Tarik Rava	1,329	23.32%	New
Margin of victory		303	5.32%	
Turnout		5,700	64.49%	
Registered electors		9,032		
Independent win (new seat)				

== See also ==
- List of constituencies of the Arunachal Pradesh Legislative Assembly
- Upper Subansiri district
