= Pesi Jilen =

Member of Arunachal Pradesh Legislative Assembly
- Incumbent
- Assumed office 1 June 2024
- Preceded by: Nyamar Karbak
- Constituency: Liromoba

Personal details
- Party: National People's Party

Pesi Jilen is an Indian politician from Arunachal Pradesh belonging to the National People's Party. He is a member of the 11th Arunachal Pradesh Legislative Assembly representing the Liromoba constituency, having defeated the BJP candidate Nyamar Karbak with 1698 votes.
