= Congress (Dolo) =

- Leader: Kameng Dolo
- Founder: Kameng Dolo
- Founded: July 25, 2003
- Dissolved: August 30, 2003
- Split from: Indian National Congress
- Merged into: Bharatiya Janata Party
- Ideology: Regionalist
- Alliance: Arunachal Congress (2003) Bharatiya Janata Party (2003)

Congress (Dolo) was a political party that split away from Indian National Congress in Arunachal Pradesh. The Congress (D) was founded July 25, 2003 by Kameng Dolo. Together with Gegong Apang of Arunachal Congress, Congress (D) formed a state government. On August 30, 2003, Congress (D) merged with the Bharatiya Janata Party.

== See also ==
- Indian National Congress breakaway parties
