= Gojen Gadi =

Indian politician

Gojen Gadi is an Indian politician from the state of Arunachal Pradesh.

Gadi was elected from the Basar constituency in the 2014 Arunachal Pradesh Legislative Assembly election, standing as a People's Party of Arunachal candidate. He lost the 2019 Arunachal Pradesh Legislative Assembly election to Gokar Basar of the NPP.

== Electoral performance ==
Election	Constituency	Party	Result	Votes %	Opposition Candidate	Opposition Party	Opposition vote %	Ref
2019	Basar	BJP	Lost	47.84%	Gokar Basar	NPP	49.63%	
2014	Basar	INC	Won	56.45%	Togo Basar	PPA	42.35%	
2009	Basar	INC	Won	60.86%	Dakter Basar	AITC	38.35%	
2004	Basar	Independent	Won	64.38%	Eken Riba	INC	35.62%	
1999	Basar	Independent	Lost	32.89%	Eken Riba	INC	36.68%	
1995	Basar	INC	Lost	44.74%	Tomo Riba	Independent	52.72%	
