= Techi Kaso =

Indian politician

Member of the Arunachal Pradesh Legislative Assembly
- Incumbent
- Assumed office 2009
- Preceded by: Kipa Babu
- Constituency: Itanagar

Personal details
- Party: Bharatiya Janata Party
- Other political affiliations: Nationalist Congress Party, Indian National Congress, JDU
- Occupation: Politician

Techi Kaso is an Indian politician. He is a member of the Legislative Assembly of Arunachal Pradesh from the Itanagar constituency. In the 2019 election he returned to office, defeating Kipa Babu by a thin margin.
