= Taliha Assembly constituency =

Legislative Assembly constituency in Arunachal Pradesh State, India

Coordinates: 28.23°N 94.15°E

Taliha
- Constituency No. 23 for the Arunachal Pradesh Legislative Assembly

Constituency details
- Country: India
- Region: Northeast India
- State: Arunachal Pradesh
- District: Upper Subansiri
- Lok Sabha constituency: Arunachal West
- Established: 1990
- Total electors: 11,397
- Reservation: ST

Member of Legislative Assembly
- 11th Arunachal Pradesh Legislative Assembly
- Incumbent Nyato Rigia
- Party: Bharatiya Janata Party

Taliha is one of the 60 Legislative Assembly constituencies of Arunachal Pradesh state in India.

It is part of Upper Subansiri district, and is reserved for candidates belonging to the Scheduled Tribes. As of 2019, its representative is Nyato Rigia of the Bharatiya Janata Party.

== Members of the Legislative Assembly ==
Election	Member	Party
1990	Tara Payeng	Janata Dal
1995	Punji Mara	Independent politician
1999	Nyato Rigia	Indian National Congress
2004	Nyato Rigia	Indian National Congress
2009	Punji Mara	Indian National Congress
2014	Punji Mara	Indian National Congress
2019	Nyato Rigia	Bharatiya Janata Party
2024	Nyato Rigia	Bharatiya Janata Party

== Election results ==
=== Assembly Election 2024 ===
2024 Arunachal Pradesh Legislative Assembly election : Taliha
Party	Candidate	Votes	%	±%
BJP	Nyato Rigia	Unopposed		
Registered electors		11,397		▲9.83
BJP hold		Swing		

=== Assembly Election 2019 ===
2019 Arunachal Pradesh Legislative Assembly election : Taliha
Party	Candidate	Votes	%	±%
BJP	Nyato Rigia	5,024	55.93%	New
NPP	Rudham Sindhu	3,821	42.54%	New
INC	Gamto Nayam	110	1.22%	New
NOTA	None of the Above	28	0.31%	New
Margin of victory		1,203	13.39%	
Turnout		8,983	86.57%	▲86.57
Registered electors		10,377		▲8.06
BJP gain from INC		Swing		

=== Assembly Election 2014 ===
2014 Arunachal Pradesh Legislative Assembly election : Taliha
Party	Candidate	Votes	%	±%
INC	Punji Mara	Unopposed		
Registered electors		9,603		▲19.69
INC hold		Swing		

=== Assembly Election 2009 ===
2009 Arunachal Pradesh Legislative Assembly election : Taliha
Party	Candidate	Votes	%	±%
INC	Punji Mara	3,570	53.01%	▼4.47
AITC	Nyato Rigia	3,164	46.99%	New
Margin of victory		406	6.03%	▼10.87
Turnout		6,734	83.93%	▲10.68
Registered electors		8,023		▲17.26
INC hold		Swing		

=== Assembly Election 2004 ===
2004 Arunachal Pradesh Legislative Assembly election : Taliha
Party	Candidate	Votes	%	±%
INC	Nyato Rigia	2,881	57.48%	▲19.12
Independent	Taning Tasiring	2,034	40.58%	New
BJP	Tara Payeng	97	1.94%	▼23.42
Margin of victory		847	16.90%	▲7.61
Turnout		5,012	69.67%	▲2.18
Registered electors		6,842		▲1.98
INC hold		Swing		

=== Assembly Election 1999 ===
1999 Arunachal Pradesh Legislative Assembly election : Taliha
Party	Candidate	Votes	%	±%
INC	Nyato Rigia	1,829	38.36%	▲13.56
AC	Punji Mara	1,386	29.07%	New
BJP	Mage Kamda	1,209	25.36%	▲12.30
Independent	Tara Payeng	344	7.21%	New
Margin of victory		443	9.29%	▼6.25
Turnout		4,768	72.96%	▼7.43
Registered electors		6,709		▲26.66
INC gain from Independent		Swing	▼1.97	

=== Assembly Election 1995 ===
1995 Arunachal Pradesh Legislative Assembly election : Taliha
Party	Candidate	Votes	%	±%
Independent	Punji Mara	1,677	40.33%	New
INC	Tara Payeng	1,031	24.80%	▼24.34
JD	Nyato Rigia	907	21.81%	▼29.05
BJP	Mage Kamda	543	13.06%	New
Margin of victory		646	15.54%	▲13.80
Turnout		4,158	82.37%	▲19.19
Registered electors		5,297		▼42.60
Independent gain from JD		Swing	▼10.54	

=== Assembly Election 1990 ===
1990 Arunachal Pradesh Legislative Assembly election : Taliha
Party	Candidate	Votes	%	±%
JD	Tara Payeng	2,784	50.87%	New
INC	Punji Mara	2,689	49.13%	New
Margin of victory		95	1.74%	
Turnout		5,473	60.72%	
Registered electors		9,228		
JD win (new seat)				

== See also ==
- List of constituencies of the Arunachal Pradesh Legislative Assembly
- Upper Subansiri district
