= Taniya Soki =

Indian politician

Member of Arunachal Pradesh Legislative Assembly
- Incumbent
- Assumed office 2019
- Preceded by: Dikto Yekar
- Constituency: Daporijo

Personal details
- Party: Bharatiya Janata Party

Taniya Soki is an Indian politician from Arunachal Pradesh belonging to the Bharatiya Janata Party. He is a member of the 11th Arunachal Pradesh Legislative Assembly.

== Education ==
He graduated from Delhi Technological University (then Delhi College of Engineering) with a degree in civil engineering in 1989.
