= Itanagar Assembly constituency =

Constituency of the Arunachal Pradesh legislative assembly in India

Coordinates: 27.091°N 93.613°E

Itanagar
- Constituency No. 13 for the Arunachal Pradesh Legislative Assembly

Constituency details
- Country: India
- Region: Northeast India
- State: Arunachal Pradesh
- District: Papum Pare
- Lok Sabha constituency: Arunachal West
- Established: 1990
- Total electors: 63,995
- Reservation: ST

Member of Legislative Assembly
- 11th Arunachal Pradesh Legislative Assembly
- Incumbent Techi Kaso
- Party: Bharatiya Janata Party
- Elected year: 2024

Itanagar is one of the 60 assembly constituencies of Arunachal Pradesh a north east state of India. It is also part of Arunachal West Lok Sabha constituency.

== Members of the Legislative Assembly ==
Year	Member	Party
1990	Lichi Legi	Janata Dal
1995	Lichi Legi	Indian National Congress
1999	Lichi Legi	Indian National Congress
2004	Kipa Babu	Bharatiya Janata Party
2009	Techi Kaso	Nationalist Congress Party
2014	Techi Kaso	Indian National Congress
2019	Techi Kaso	Janata Dal
2024	Techi Kaso	Bharatiya Janata Party

== Election results ==
=== Assembly Election 2024 ===
2024 Arunachal Pradesh Legislative Assembly election : Itanagar
Party	Candidate	Votes	%	±%
BJP	Techi Kaso	Unopposed		
Registered electors		63,995		▲4.48
BJP gain from JD(U)		Swing		

=== Assembly Election 2019 ===
2019 Arunachal Pradesh Legislative Assembly election: Itanagar
Party	Candidate	Votes	%	±%
JD(U)	Techi Kaso	12,162	44.30%	New
BJP	Kipa Babu	11,860	43.20%	▲2.12
INC	Yumlam Achung	2,173	7.92%	▼47.42
JD(S)	Taba Thomas	695	2.53%	New
NPP	Techi Tolu Tara	285	1.04%	New
NOTA	None of the Above	276	1.01%	▼0.04
Margin of victory		302	1.10%	▼13.16
Turnout		27,451	44.82%	▼10.62
Registered electors		61,252		▲0.01
JD(U) gain from INC		Swing	▼11.03	

=== Assembly Election 2014 ===
2014 Arunachal Pradesh Legislative Assembly election : Itanagar
Party	Candidate	Votes	%	±%
INC	Techi Kaso	18,790	55.34%	▲21.31
BJP	Tame Phassang	13,949	41.08%	▲24.52
PPA	Toko Sheetal	418	1.23%	New
NOTA	None of the Above	356	1.05%	New
NPF	Tarh Tada	232	0.68%	New
Independent	Takam Tatung	210	0.62%	New
Margin of victory		4,841	14.26%	▲2.80
Turnout		33,955	55.44%	▲4.46
Registered electors		61,245		▲5.63
INC gain from NCP		Swing	▲9.85	

=== Assembly Election 2009 ===
2009 Arunachal Pradesh Legislative Assembly election : Itanagar
Party	Candidate	Votes	%	±%
NCP	Techi Kaso	13,443	45.48%	▲35.47
INC	Kipa Babu	10,057	34.03%	▼6.79
BJP	Lichi Legi	4,894	16.56%	▼32.61
AITC	Techi Necha	884	2.99%	New
JD(U)	Tami Taniang	278	0.94%	New
Margin of victory		3,386	11.46%	▲3.11
Turnout		29,556	50.98%	▲5.26
Registered electors		57,979		▲36.12
NCP gain from BJP		Swing	▼3.68	

=== Assembly Election 2004 ===
2004 Arunachal Pradesh Legislative Assembly election : Itanagar
Party	Candidate	Votes	%	±%
BJP	Kipa Babu	9,575	49.17%	▲24.74
INC	Lichi Legi	7,950	40.82%	▲4.99
NCP	Dr. Biman Natung	1,950	10.01%	▼5.97
Margin of victory		1,625	8.34%	▼3.06
Turnout		19,475	45.60%	▼2.94
Registered electors		42,595		▲9.76
BJP gain from INC		Swing		

=== Assembly Election 1999 ===
1999 Arunachal Pradesh Legislative Assembly election : Itanagar
Party	Candidate	Votes	%	±%
INC	Lichi Legi	6,766	35.83%	▼16.43
BJP	Mallo Tarin	4,612	24.42%	▲19.26
NCP	Techi Nera	3,018	15.98%	New
AC	Techi Necha	1,996	10.57%	New
Independent	Sanjoy Tassar	1,865	9.88%	New
Ajeya Bharat Party	Tadar Tempo	425	2.25%	New
Independent	Techi Boy	201	1.06%	New
Margin of victory		2,154	11.41%	▼10.96
Turnout		18,883	51.26%	▼13.62
Registered electors		38,807		▲7.60
INC hold		Swing	▼16.43	

=== Assembly Election 1995 ===
1995 Arunachal Pradesh Legislative Assembly election : Itanagar
Party	Candidate	Votes	%	±%
INC	Lichi Legi	11,740	52.27%	▲17.73
JD	Nabum Rebia	6,717	29.90%	▼15.15
Independent	Kamen Ringu	2,844	12.66%	New
BJP	Chau Tan Manpoong	1,161	5.17%	New
Margin of victory		5,023	22.36%	▲11.84
Turnout		22,462	63.53%	▲11.81
Registered electors		36,066		▲26.29
INC gain from JD		Swing	▲7.21	

=== Assembly Election 1990 ===
1990 Arunachal Pradesh Legislative Assembly election : Itanagar
Party	Candidate	Votes	%	±%
JD	Lichi Legi	6,494	45.05%	New
INC	Techi Takur	4,978	34.54%	New
Independent	Rajen Nani	1,441	10.00%	New
Independent	Pura Tado	1,050	7.28%	New
JP	Taba Hare	451	3.13%	New
Margin of victory		1,516	10.52%	
Turnout		14,414	51.46%	
Registered electors		28,559		
JD win (new seat)				

== See also ==
- Itanagar
- Papum Pare district
- List of constituencies of Arunachal Pradesh Legislative Assembly
