= Tenzin Nyima Glow =

Indian politician

Member of Arunachal Pradesh Legislative Assembly
- Incumbent
- Assumed office 1 June 2024
- Preceded by: Kumsi Sidisow
- Constituency: Thrizino-Buragaon

Personal details
- Party: Independent

Tenzin Nyima Glow is an Indian politician from Arunachal Pradesh. He is a member of the 11th Arunachal Pradesh Legislative Assembly representing the Thrizino-Buragaon constituency.
