= Jalley Sonam =

North-east Indian politician

Jally Sonam is an Indian trade unionist and politician. As of 2014 he is the president of the All Arunachal Pradesh Workers Union. As of 2012 he served as working president of the Arunachal Pradesh branch of the Indian National Trade Union Congress and joint convenor of the North-East states for INTUC. Sonam served as chairman of the Arunachal Pradesh Building & Other Construction Workers Welfare Board (APB&OCWWB). He was removed from this post by the Arunachal Pradesh state government on 27 January 2014, midst protests from AAPWU and INTUC. Two days later Sonam joined the People's Party of Arunachal (PPA). PPA fielded Sonam as its candidate for the Arunachal West seat in the 2014 Indian general election.
