= Kumsi Sidisow =

Indian politician

Kumsi Sidisow MLA of 6-Thrizino-Buragaon (ST)

Assembly Member for Legislative Assembly of Arunachal Pradesh
- Incumbent
- Assumed office May 2014

Personal details
- Party: BJP

Kumsi Sidisow is an Indian politician of the Bharatiya Janata Party from Arunachal Pradesh. He served as a member of the Legislative Assembly of Arunachal Pradesh from the Thrizino-Buragaon (ST) constituency from 2009 to 2024.
