= Toko Tatung =

Indian politician

Member of Arunachal Pradesh Legislative Assembly
- Incumbent
- Assumed office 1 June 2024
- Preceded by: Taba Tedir
- Constituency: Yachuli

Personal details
- Party: Nationalist Congress Party

Toko Tatung is an Indian politician from Arunachal Pradesh belonging to the Nationalist Congress Party. He is a member of the 11th Arunachal Pradesh Legislative Assembly from the Yachuli constituency. He was first elected in the 2024 Arunachal Pradesh Legislative Assembly election, winning over BJP's candidate Taba Tedir by 228 votes.

== Education ==
He graduated from the University of Delhi with a Bachelor of Arts degree in 2000.
