= Tseten Chombay Kee =

Indian politician

Member of Arunachal Pradesh Legislative Assembly
- Incumbent
- Assumed office 1 June 2024
- Preceded by: Dorjee Wangdi Kharma
- Constituency: Kalaktang

Personal details
- Party: Bharatiya Janata Party

Tseten Chombay Kee is an Indian politician from Arunachal Pradesh belonging to the Bharatiya Janata Party. He is a member of the Legislative Assembly in the 11th Arunachal Pradesh Legislative Assembly, representing the Kalaktang constituency. He won with 5397 votes.

== Education ==
He graduated with a PG Diploma in Public Relations from St. Xaviers College, University of Mumbai.
