= Tapuk Taku =

Indian politician

Tapuk Taku is an Indian politician from the state of Arunachal Pradesh.

Taku was elected unopposed from the Seppa East seat in the 2014 Arunachal Pradesh Legislative Assembly election, standing as a People's Party of Arunachal candidate.

== See also ==
- Arunachal Pradesh Legislative Assembly
