= Nyabi Jini Dirchi =

Indian politician

Member of Arunachal Pradesh Legislative Assembly
- Incumbent
- Assumed office 1 June 2024
- Preceded by: Gokar Basar
- Constituency: Basar

Personal details
- Party: Bharatiya Janata Party

Nyabi Jini Dirchi is an Indian politician from Arunachal Pradesh belonging to the Bharatiya Janata Party. She is a member of the 11th Arunachal Pradesh Legislative Assembly representing the Basar constituency, having defeated the NPP candidate Gokar Basar, with 1791 votes.

== Electoral performance ==
| Election | Constituency | Party | Result | Votes % | Opposition Candidate | Opposition Party | Opposition vote % | Ref |
|---|---|---|---|---|---|---|---|---|
| 2024 | Basar | BJP | Won | 55.26% | Gokar Basar | NPP | 44.47% | |

== Education ==
She graduated with a Bachelor of Arts from Indira Gandhi National Open University in December 2022.
