= Tumke Bagra =

Indian politician

Er. Tumke Bagra

Deputy Speaker of Arunachal Pradesh Legislative Assembly
- In office 7 March 2017 – 1 March 2019
- In office 23 March 2016 – 13 July 2016
- Preceded by: Tenzing Norbu Thongdok
- Succeeded by: Alo Libang

Arunachal Pradesh Legislative Assembly
- In office 16 May 2014 – 1 March 2019
- Constituency: 30-Along West

Personal details
- Born: 1 March 1955 (age 71) Lipu Bagra, Aalo, West Siang, Arunachal Pradesh, India
- Party: Bharatiya Janata Party
- Spouse: Smty. Jumbi Bagra
- Children: 5
- Occupation: Politician

Er. Tumke Bagra (born March 1, 1955, in Lipu Bagra, West Siang district) is an Indian politician belonging to the Bharatiya Janata Party from Arunachal Pradesh. He was a member of the Arunachal Pradesh Legislative Assembly elected from the Aalo West Constituency in West Siang district. He became Deputy Speaker of the Arunachal Pradesh Legislative Assembly on 23 March 2016, serving until 13 July 2016. Bagra was again elected as Deputy Speaker in March 2017. On 23 May 2019, he was elected for a second term & served as Cabinet Minister for Industry, Trade & Commerce and Skill Development in the Pema Kandu government.

== Early life ==
Bagra obtained a degree in Civil Engineering and served as q rechnocrat and bureaucrat in various capacities for the State government before entering politics.
