= Punji Mara =

Indian politician (1943/1944–2025)

Punji Mara (1943 or 1944 – 18 November 2025) was an Indian politician from the state of Arunachal Pradesh.

== Life and career ==
Mara was elected unopposed from the Taliha constituency in the 2014 Arunachal Pradesh Legislative Assembly election, standing as a People's Party of Arunachal candidate. Punji Mara was born to Makpung Mara, who was a Lieutenant in the Indian Army.

Mara died of complications from a stroke on 18 November 2025, at the age of 81.

== See also ==
Arunachal Pradesh Legislative Assembly
