= Nakap Nalo =

Indian politician

Member of the Arunachal Pradesh Legislative Assembly

Nakap Nalo is a Bharatiya Janata Party politician from Arunachal Pradesh. He was elected in Arunachal Pradesh Legislative Assembly election in 2019 from the Nacho constituency as a candidate of the Bharatiya Janata Party. He served as the minister of Tourism and Transport & Civil Aviation departments in Second Pema Khandu ministry from 2014 to 2019.
