= Eken Riba =

Indian politician

Eken Riba is a former Minister of State for Law, Justice & Cooperation of the Indian State of Arunachal Pradesh. He was elected to Basar Constituency in the year 1999–2004. He is also the first person to become a Lawyer from the state of Arunachal Pradesh. He is currently one of 4 State Information Commissioners for the Government of Arunachal Pradesh since January 2014. He is also a recipient of the prestigious Bharat Excellence Award. Though a Law graduate, most of his life has been in public field comprising General Secretary of his school, General Secretary of Students Union, Political Secretary and Minister of State spanning over half a decade. His first steps into public field was in 1966 when he was elected to the post of General Secretary for his School at Aalo when he was in class 10. The following year he was re-elected. Though a bright student all his life, he failed class 12 examination in 1969 due to over engagement into public field. He reappeared the following year and passed the examination. In 1971 he was elected for the post of General Secretary of NEFA Students Union. He was also chosen as the General Secretary for Jawaharlal Nehru College at Pasighat in Arunachal Pradesh. In 1973 the NEFA Students Union ceased to exist and hence he was its last General Secretary. In 1973 he became the President of his college. He passed from JN College in 1973 with B.A. (hons). In 1974-75 he became the first President of the All Arunachal Pradesh Students Union or AAPSU. From 1975 to 1977 he studied at Delhi University (DU) Jubilee Hall and passed out in llb in Law. He practiced Law at Delhi for several months after which he went to Guwahati High Court to practice the same. He first propagated for the regional political party of Arunachal Pradesh, the People's Party of Arunachal or PPA. Later he joined the national party of India, the Congress Party. In 1999 he was elected to Basar Constituency and became the Minister of State for Law, Justice & Cooperation in the Government of Arunachal Pradesh. In 2009 he was appointed an Advisor to the Chief Minister of Arunachal, the late Dorjee Khandu. Since January 2014, he is one of 4 State Information Commissioners for the Government of Arunachal Pradesh.
