= Rotom Tebin =

Indian politician

Member of Arunachal Pradesh Legislative Assembly
- Incumbent
- Assumed office 1 June 2024
- Preceded by: Tarin Dapke
- Constituency: Raga

Personal details
- Party: Bharatiya Janata Party

Rotom Tebin is an Indian politician from Arunachal Pradesh belonging to the Bharatiya Janata Party. He is a member of the 11th Arunachal Pradesh Legislative Assembly from the Raga constituency. Before entering politics, he was a chief engineer in the Public Works Department at Namsai, Eastern Zone, for the government of Arunachal Pradesh.

== Education ==
He graduated from the University of North Bengal with a Bachelor of Engineering.
