= Kameng Dolo =

Indian politician from Arunachal Pradesh

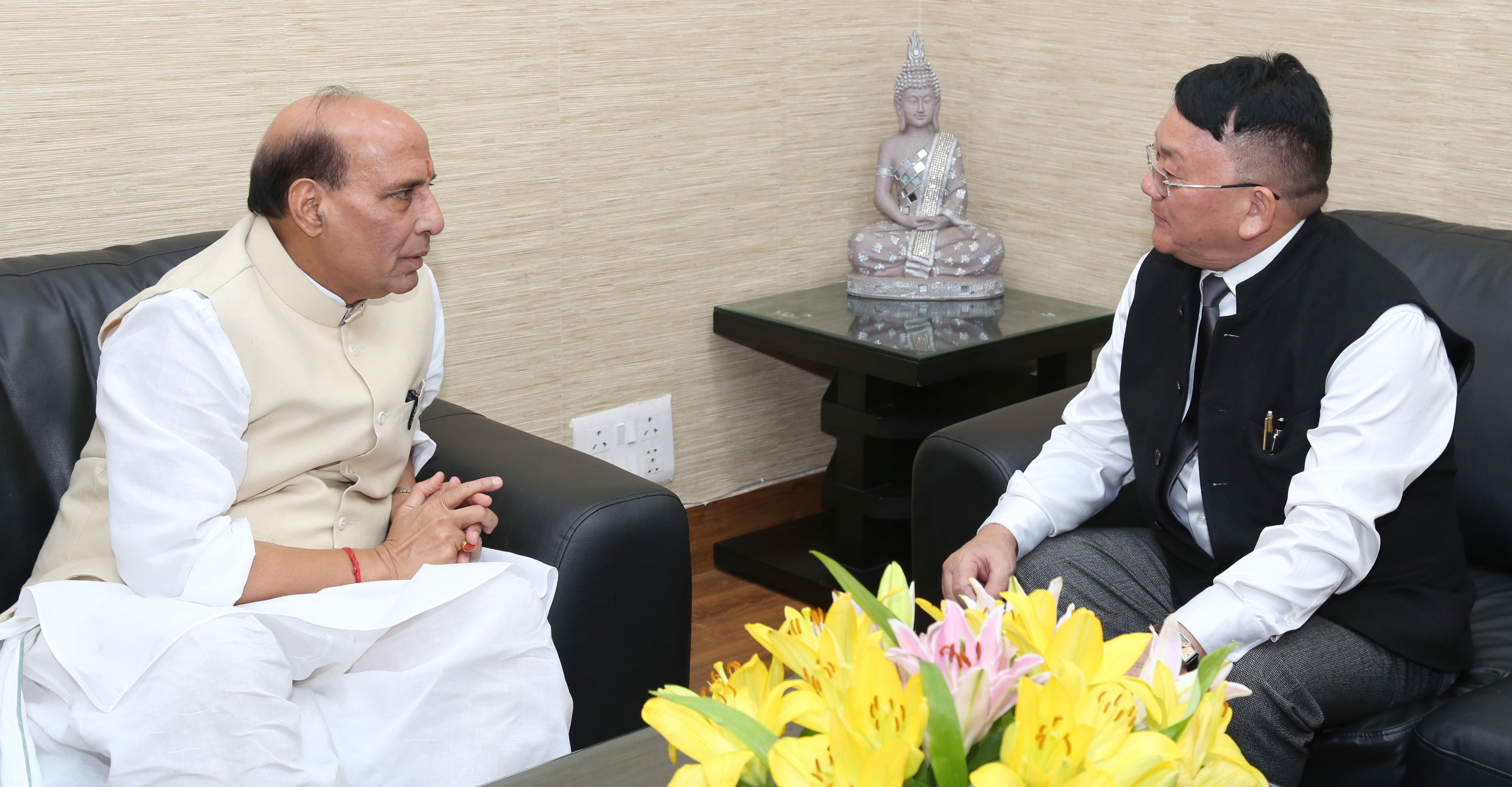
- Kameng Dolo calling on the Union Home Minister, Rajnath Singh, in New Delhi on June 25, 2016

Deputy Chief Minister of Arunachal Pradesh
- In office 3 August 2003 – 7 July 2004

Deputy Chief Minister of Arunachal Pradesh
- In office 19 February 2016 – 13 July 2016

Member of Arunachal Pradesh Legislative Assembly

Personal details
- Party: Bharatiya Janata Party
- Other political affiliations: Indian National Congress; Congress (Dolo)
- Occupation: Politician

Kameng Dolo is an Indian politician from Arunachal Pradesh. He served as the Home Minister & Deputy Chief Minister of Arunachal Pradesh in the Kalikho Pul and Gegong Apang governments.

He founded the Congress (Dolo) on July 25, 2003, and formed a government along with Gegong Apang of Arunachal Congress. On August 30, 2003, he merged the Congress (D) with the Bharatiya Janata Party. He is also a member of the Bharatiya Janata Party. He shifted his loyalties in 2015 when the Indian National Congress member revolted in their government.

Kameng Dolo unsuccessfully contested the Pakke-Kessang Assembly by-election in December 2017.

On 8 March 2017, Dolo lost his seat following an allegation from an opposing candidate for his seat that his candidacy was fraudulently withdrawn, making Dolo unopposed.

== See also ==
- List of deputy chief ministers of Arunachal Pradesh
