= Kipa Babu =

Indian politician

Kipa Babu is a Bharatiya Janata Party politician from Arunachal Pradesh. He has been elected in Arunachal Pradesh Legislative Assembly election in 2004 from Itanagar.
