= Kiren Rijiju =

Indian politician (born 1971)

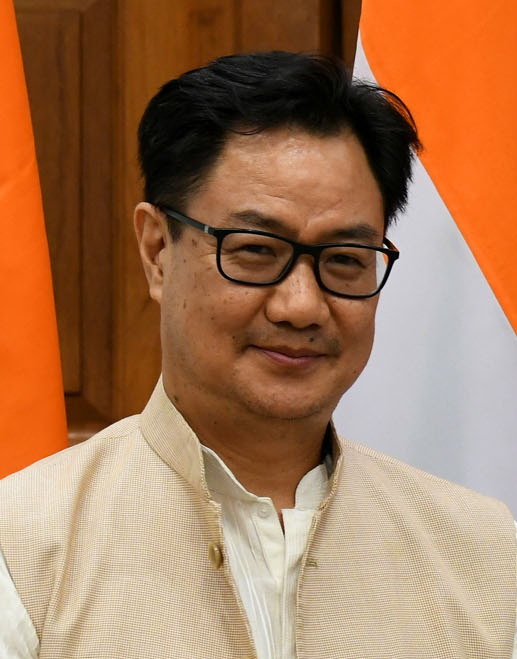
- Official portrait, 2021

Union Minister of Parliamentary Affairs
- Incumbent
- Assumed office 10 June 2024
- Prime Minister: Narendra Modi
- Deputy: Arjun Ram Meghwal; L. Murugan
- Preceded by: Pralhad Joshi

Union Minister of Minority Affairs
- Incumbent
- Assumed office 10 June 2024
- Prime Minister: Narendra Modi
- Deputy: George Kurian
- Preceded by: Smriti Irani
Former ministerial offices
Union Minister of Earth Sciences
In office 18 May 2023 – 9 June 2024
Prime Minister	Narendra Modi
Preceded by	Jitendra Singh
Succeeded by	Jitendra Singh
Union Minister of Food Processing Industries
In office 20 March 2024 – 9 June 2024
Prime Minister	Narendra Modi
Deputy	Shobha Karandlaje
Preceded by	Pashupati Kumar Paras
Succeeded by	Chirag Paswan
Union Minister of Law and Justice
In office 7 July 2021 – 18 May 2023
Prime Minister	Narendra Modi
Preceded by	Ravi Shankar Prasad
Succeeded by	Arjun Ram Meghwal
Union Minister of State (Independent Charge) of Youth Affairs and Sports
In office 31 May 2019 – 7 July 2021
Prime Minister	Narendra Modi
Preceded by	Rajyavardhan Singh Rathore
Succeeded by	Anurag Thakur
Union Minister of State for Minority Affairs
In office 31 May 2019 – 7 July 2021
Minister	Mukhtar Abbas Naqvi
Preceded by	Virendra Kumar Khatik
Succeeded by	John Barla
Union Minister of State for Home Affairs
In office 27 May 2014 – 30 May 2019 Serving with Haribhai Parthibhai Chaudhary (2014–2016) and Hansraj Gangaram Ahir (2016–2019)
Minister	Rajnath Singh
Preceded by	R. P. N. Singh
Succeeded by	Nityanand Rai

Member of Parliament, Lok Sabha
- Incumbent
- Assumed office 16 May 2014
- Preceded by: Takam Sanjoy
- Constituency: Arunachal West
- In office 16 May 2004 – 17 May 2009
- Preceded by: Jarbom Gamlin
- Constituency: Arunachal West
- Succeeded by: Takam Sanjoy

Personal details
- Born: 19 November 1971 (age 54) Nafra, North-East Frontier Agency, India
- Party: Bharatiya Janata Party
- Spouse: Joram Rina Rijiju (m. 2004)
- Education: B.A., LL.B
- Alma mater: Delhi University
- Occupation: Politician
- Website: sites.google.com/site/kirenrijiju/

Kiren Rijiju (born 19 November 1971) is an Indian politician who is serving as the 28th Minister of Parliamentary Affairs and 7th Minister of Minority Affairs since 2024. He was the Cabinet Minister of Earth Sciences and Food Processing Industries in the Government of India from 2023 to June 2024 and a Member of Parliament in the Lok Sabha from Arunachal West since 2014 and from 2004 to 2009. Earlier, he served as the Minister of State for Home Affairs from 2014 to 2019, Minister of State for Minority Affairs from 2019 to 2021, Minister of State (Independent Charge) for Sports and Youth Affairs from 2019 to 2021 and the Law minister from 2021 to 2023.

== Early life ==
Rijiju was born on 19 November 1971 to a Buddhist family in the Nakhu village near the Nafra town in the Kameng district of North-East Frontier Agency (present-day Arunachal Pradesh). His father's name is Rinchin Kharu and his mother's name is Chirai Rijiju. His father was the first pro-tempore speaker of the first Arunachal Pradesh Legislative Assembly.

== Education ==
Rijiju did his graduation degree (B.A.) from Hansraj College, University of Delhi. Further, in 1998, he did his graduate degree in law (LL.B) from Campus Law Centre, Faculty of Law, University of Delhi.

== Political career ==
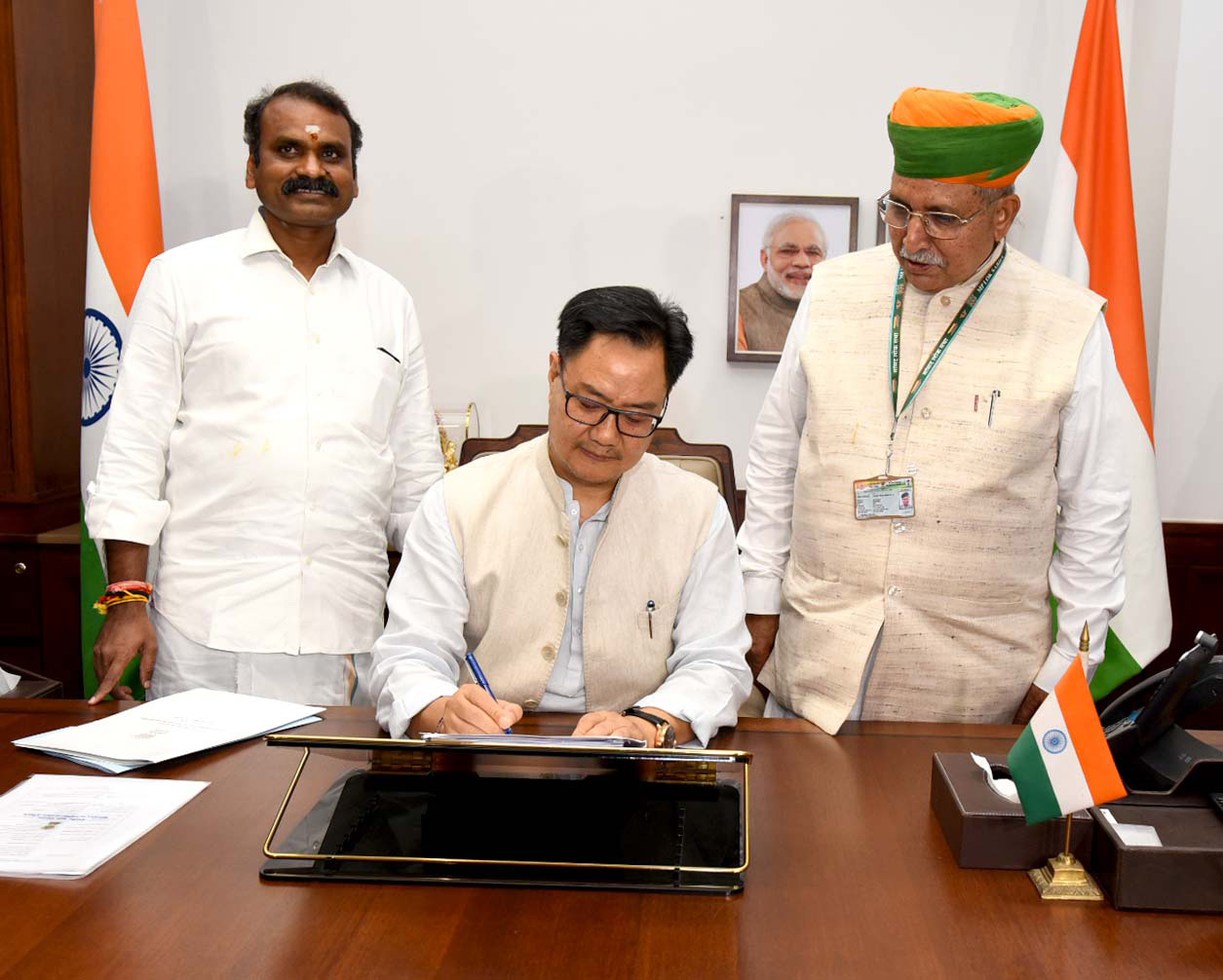
Rijiju assuming charge as the Union Minister for Parliamentary Affairs

Kiren Rijiju is a four time MP in Lok Sabha from Arunachal Pradesh (2004, 2014, 2019 and 2024). He has served as minister of state (MoS) (independent charge) youth affairs and sports, MoS minority affairs, MoS home affairs, and Minister of Law and Justice. His tenure as Law Minister was marked by controversies. On 18 May 2023, he was assigned the portfolio of Ministry of Earth Sciences. On 10 June 2024, he was appointed the Union Cabinet Minister for Parliamentary Affairs and Minority Affairs in the Government of India. He is one of the three Buddhist MPs in the 18th Lok Sabha.

== Controversies ==
In 2022, Kiren called the collegium system of appointment of judges in Indian judicial system as "opaque", implying that appointments are done on personal associations rather than merit. He also advocated for government's role in the appointment of judges, writing to the Chief Justice of India DY Chandrachud. His comments on judiciary and collegium system were widely criticised by the legal community and the Supreme Court.

In March 2023, Kiren accused some retired judges to be a part of an "Anti-India gang". A group of former civil servants from the Constitutional Conduct Group responded by claiming Rijiju's comments a sign of "authoritarianism".

== Personal life ==
He married Joram Rina Rijiju in 2004. She is a graduate from Lady Shri Ram College for Women, New Delhi and is a gold medalist from Arunachal University. She is an Associate Professor teaching history at Dera Natung Government College, Itanagar in Arunachal Pradesh.

== See also ==
- Third Modi ministry

Lok Sabha
Preceded by Jarbom Gamlin	Member of Parliament for Arunachal West; 22 May 2004 – 17 May 2009	Succeeded by Takam Sanjoy
Preceded by Takam Sanjoy	Member of Parliament for Arunachal West; 16 May 2014 – Present	Incumbent
Political offices
Preceded by R. P. N. Singh	Minister of State for Home Affairs; 26 May 2014 – 30 May 2019; With: Haribhai Parthibhai Chaudhary; 9 November 2014 – 5 July 2016; Hansraj Gangaram Ahir; 5 July 2016 – 30 May 2019	Succeeded by G. Kishan Reddy
Preceded by Virendra Kumar Khatik	Minister of State for Minority Affairs; 30 May 2019 – 7 July 2021	Succeeded by John Barla
Preceded by Rajyavardhan Singh Rathore; Minister of State (Independent Charge)	Minister of Youth Affairs and Sports; Minister of State (Independent Charge); 30 May 2019 – 7 July 2021	Succeeded by Anurag Singh Thakur
Preceded by Ravi Shankar Prasad	Minister of Law and Justice; 7 July 2021 – 18 May 2023	Succeeded by Arjun Ram Meghwal; Minister of State (Independent Charge)
Preceded by Jitendra Singh; Minister of State (Independent Charge)	Minister of Earth Sciences; 18 May 2023 – 10 June 2024	Succeeded by Jitendra Singh; Minister of State (Independent Charge)
Preceded by Pashupati Kumar Paras	Minister of Food Processing Industries; 20 March 2024 – 10 June 2024	Succeeded by Chirag Paswan
Preceded by Pralhad Joshi	Minister of Parliamentary Affairs; 10 June 2024 – Present	Incumbent
Preceded by Smriti Irani	Minister of Minority Affairs; 10 June 2024 – Present	Incumbent
