= Karya Bagang =

Indian politician (born 1977)

- Born: 20 March 1977 (age 49); Arunachal Pradesh
- Citizenship: India
- Occupation: Politician

Karya Bagang (born on 20 March 1977) is an Indian politician from the state of Arunachal Pradesh.

Bagang was elected to the Arunachal Pradesh Legislative Assembly from the Chayangtajo Assembly constituency seat in the 2009 Arunachal Pradesh Legislative Assembly election as a Trinamool Congress candidate. She was reelected in the 2014 Arunachal Pradesh Legislative Assembly election, standing as an Indian National Congress candidate. On 23 Oct 2009 Karya Bagang, became the first woman MLA from the Chayangtajo constituency.
