= Tapen Siga =

Indian politician

Tapen Siga is a politician from Arunachal Pradesh state in India. He was a member of the Arunachal Pradesh Assembly for Daporijo in Upper Subansiri district. He belongs to the Bhartiya Janata Party.

Tapen Siga unsuccessfully contested the Rajya Sabha election in 2014 and lost to the Congress candidate Mukut Mithi by a margin of 37 votes.
