= Nido Pavitra =

Indian politician

Nido Pavitra is a Congress Party MLA and Parliamentary Secretary in the Health and Family Welfare Department of Arunachal Pradesh, India. His son, Nido Taniam was the victim of murder.
