= Dikto Yekar =

Indian politician

Dikto Yekar is an Indian politician from the state of Arunachal Pradesh.

Yekar was elected from the Daporijo constituency in the 2014 Arunachal Pradesh Legislative Assembly election, standing as an Indian National Congress candidate.

== See also ==
- Arunachal Pradesh Legislative Assembly
