= Nyamar Karbak =

Indian politician

Nyamar Karbak is an Indian politician from the state of Arunachal Pradesh.

Karbak was elected from Liromoba in a 2015 by-election for the Arunachal Pradesh Legislative Assembly, standing as an INC candidate.

== See also ==
Arunachal Pradesh Legislative Assembly
