= Tenzing Norbu Thongdok =

Indian politician

Tenzing Norbu Thongdok Member of North Eastern Council
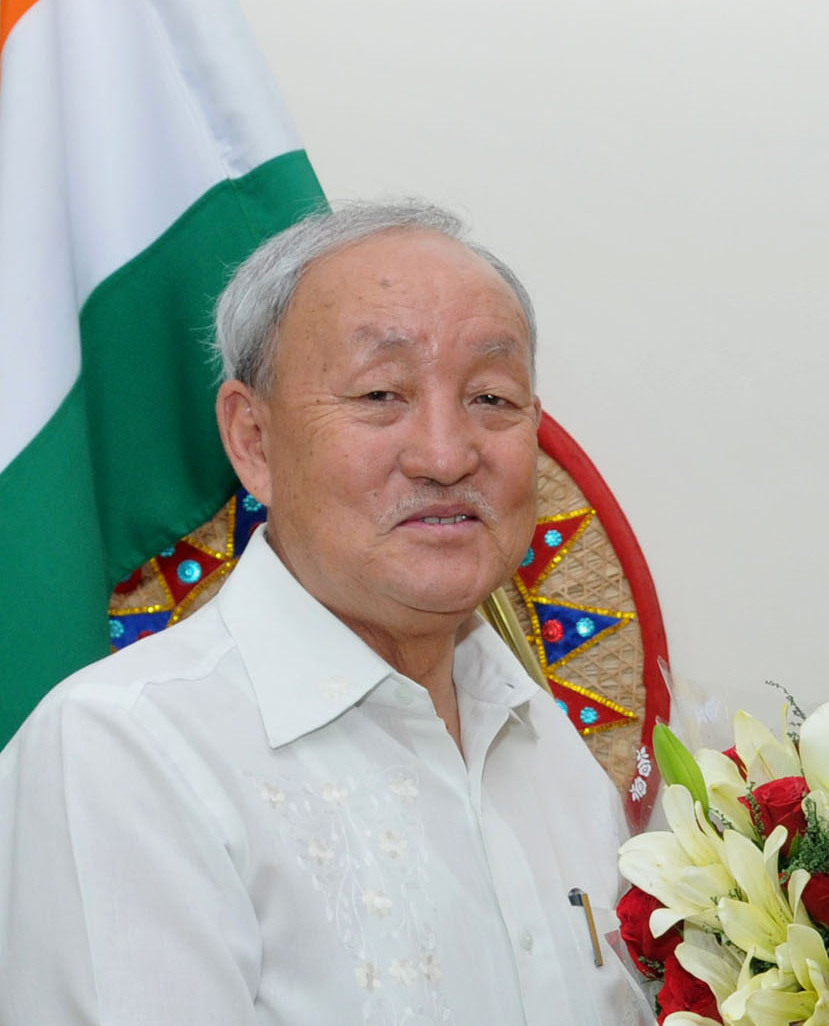
- Shri Tenzing Norbu Thongdok in New Delhi

Ministry of Development of North Eastern Region

Personal details
- Born: 12 March 1951 (age 75) Jigaon
- Spouse: Dorjee Dema

Tenzing Norbu Thongdok, the Hon'ble Member of the North Eastern Council (NEC), Ministry of DoNER, Government of India and former Speaker of the Arunachal Pradesh Legislative Assembly, is a distinguished engineer, administrator, and legislator. Born on 12 March 1951 in West Kameng District, Arunachal Pradesh, he graduated in Civil Engineering from Jorhat Engineering College, Assam and was conferred the Fellowship of The Institution of Engineers (India).

Over a career spanning 35 years in government service, he rose from Assistant Engineer to Chief Engineer, PWD and later served as Secretary in key departments including Public Health Engineering Department (PHED) and Power. During his tenure, he initiated transformative policies such as the Hydropower Policy of Arunachal Pradesh and spearheaded major water supply projects.

He was responsible for the preparation of project reports on National Highways, as well as reports on the State Power Transmission and Distribution System of Arunachal Pradesh. He also contributed to the drafting of the Arunachal Pradesh Town and Country Planning Act and formulated an action plan for the development of housing stock in the state.

Entering public life, he was elected twice as a Member of the Legislative Assembly from Kalaktang Constituency. He went on to serve in important capacities including chairman, Pollution Control Board, Parliamentary Secretary, Principal Advisor to Chief Minister, Deputy Speaker, Minister (Power) and ultimately as Speaker of the Legislative Assembly, during which he oversaw the completion and inauguration of the new Assembly Secretariat at Itanagar and introduced significant reforms in legislative functioning.

Shri Tenzing Norbu Thongdok has represented Arunachal Pradesh and India at several national and international forums, including CPA Conferences in the UK, Bangladesh and India, the NERCPA Conference and the CPC India Region, Zone-III Conference, where he delivered notable addresses on democracy, sustainable development, insurgency resolution and organic farming. His official visits have taken him across Asia, Europe and the Commonwealth nations, contributing to global dialogues on infrastructure, governance and parliamentary democracy.

In recognition of his long and distinguished career, the Govt. of India appointed Shri Tenzing Norbu Thongdok as a Member of the North Eastern Council, Ministry of DoNER on 14 February 2024.

== See also ==
- Arunachal Pradesh Legislative Assembly
