= Jomlo Bari =

- Village
- Village of West Siang
- Location in Arunachal Pradesh, India Jomlo Bari (India)
- Coordinates: 28.192442°N 94.801361°E
- Country: India
- State: Arunachal Pradesh
- District: West Siang
- Circle: Rumgong

Government
  - Type: ZPM, MLA, MP
  - MLA: Tamiyo Taga
  - MP: Kiren Rijiju
- Time zone: IST (UTC+5:30)
- Students' Union Name: All Jomlo Bari Students' Union
- Website: www.westsiang.nic.in

Jomlo Bari is a small village reside at West Siang District, Arunachal Pradesh.

== See also ==
- West Siang
- Along

== Notes ==
- The Kebang is the main supreme social council and a court in the village.
- The Head Goan Bura is the supreme presidential member of the village.
- Law and order in the village is being handled by the Goan Buras of the village.
- The students' union wing in the village is known as All Jomlo Bari Students' Union.
- The Dere is the main cultural stage as well as supreme platform of the village.
