= Lokpeng =

Village in India

Coordinates: 28.223°N 94.893°E

Lokpeng is a village located in Pangin town of Siang district ( earlier East Siang district ) of Arunachal Pradesh in India.

As per Population Census 2011, in the village there are total 48 families with population of 191 and with 94 males and 97 females.
