= Pangin Assembly constituency =

Legislative Assembly constituency in Arunachal Pradesh State, India

Coordinates: 28.14°N 95.27°E

Pangin
- Constituency No. 35 for the Arunachal Pradesh Legislative Assembly

Constituency details
- Country: India
- Region: Northeast India
- State: Arunachal Pradesh
- District: Siang
- Lok Sabha constituency: Arunachal East
- Established: 1990
- Total electors: 14,239
- Reservation: ST

Member of Legislative Assembly
- 11th Arunachal Pradesh Legislative Assembly
- Incumbent Ojing Tasing
- Party: Bharatiya Janata Party

Pangin is one of the 60 Legislative Assembly constituencies of Arunachal Pradesh state in India.

It is part of Siang district and is reserved for candidates belonging to the Scheduled Tribes.

== Members of the Legislative Assembly ==
Year	Member	Party
1990	Tahung Tatak	Indian National Congress
1995	Tahung Tatak	Indian National Congress
1999	Tahung Tatak	Indian National Congress
2004	Tapang Taloh	Bharatiya Janata Party
2009	Tapang Taloh	Indian National Congress
2014	Tapang Taloh	People's Party of Arunachal
2019	Ojing Tasing	Bharatiya Janata Party
2024	Ojing Tasing	Bharatiya Janata Party

== Election results ==
=== Assembly Election 2024 ===
2024 Arunachal Pradesh Legislative Assembly election : Pangin
Party	Candidate	Votes	%	±%
BJP	Ojing Tasing	7,500	58.33%	▼9.34
NCP	Tapang Taloh	4,906	38.16%	New
INC	Takku Jerang	361	2.81%	▼29.01
NPP	Tamo Taggu	68	0.53%	New
NOTA	None of the Above	22	0.17%	▼0.33
Margin of victory		2,594	20.18%	▼15.69
Turnout		12,857	90.29%	▲3.68
Registered electors		14,239		▲9.15
BJP hold		Swing	▼9.34	

=== Assembly Election 2019 ===
Arunachal Pradesh Legislative Assembly Election, 2019: Pangin
Party	Candidate	Votes	%	±%
BJP	Ojing Tasing	7,647	67.68%	▲21.14
INC	Tapang Taloh	3,595	31.82%	▼20.31
NOTA	None of the Above	57	0.50%	▲0.32
Margin of victory		4,052	35.86%	▲30.27
Turnout		11,299	86.62%	▲1.18
Registered electors		13,045		▲2.79
BJP gain from INC		Swing	▲15.55	

=== Assembly Election 2014 ===
2014 Arunachal Pradesh Legislative Assembly election : Pangin
Party	Candidate	Votes	%	±%
INC	Tapang Taloh	5,652	52.13%	▼10.67
BJP	Ojing Tasing	5,046	46.54%	New
Independent	Tayam Siram	125	1.15%	New
NOTA	None of the Above	20	0.18%	New
Margin of victory		606	5.59%	▼19.99
Turnout		10,843	85.44%	▲1.41
Registered electors		12,691		▼1.90
INC hold		Swing	▼10.67	

=== Assembly Election 2009 ===
2009 Arunachal Pradesh Legislative Assembly election : Pangin
Party	Candidate	Votes	%	±%
INC	Tapang Taloh	6,826	62.79%	▲17.50
NCP	Kaling Jerang	4,045	37.21%	New
Margin of victory		2,781	25.58%	▲16.17
Turnout		10,871	84.03%	▲8.62
Registered electors		12,937		▲3.36
INC gain from BJP		Swing		

=== Assembly Election 2004 ===
2004 Arunachal Pradesh Legislative Assembly election : Pangin
Party	Candidate	Votes	%	±%
BJP	Tapang Taloh	5,163	54.70%	▲17.16
INC	Tanyong Tatak	4,275	45.30%	▼3.60
Margin of victory		888	9.41%	▼1.94
Turnout		9,438	73.60%	▼6.13
Registered electors		12,516		▲19.58
BJP gain from INC		Swing		

=== Assembly Election 1999 ===
1999 Arunachal Pradesh Legislative Assembly election : Pangin
Party	Candidate	Votes	%	±%
INC	Tanyong Tatak	4,173	48.89%	▲5.37
BJP	Tapang Taloh	3,204	37.54%	▲7.25
AC	Tahung Tatak	1,158	13.57%	New
Margin of victory		969	11.35%	▼1.88
Turnout		8,535	82.92%	▼6.36
Registered electors		10,467		▲19.25
INC hold		Swing		

=== Assembly Election 1995 ===
1995 Arunachal Pradesh Legislative Assembly election : Pangin
Party	Candidate	Votes	%	±%
INC	Tahung Tatak	3,358	43.53%	▲10.37
BJP	Tanyong Tatak	2,337	30.29%	New
JD	Tabin Taki	1,217	15.77%	▼15.15
Independent	Tayam Siram	536	6.95%	New
Independent	Tamak Taduk	267	3.46%	New
Margin of victory		1,021	13.23%	▲12.98
Turnout		7,715	88.74%	▲4.18
Registered electors		8,777		▼3.32
INC hold		Swing	▲10.37	

=== Assembly Election 1990 ===
1990 Arunachal Pradesh Legislative Assembly election : Pangin
Party	Candidate	Votes	%	±%
INC	Tahung Tatak	2,520	33.16%	New
Independent	Tanyong Tatak	2,501	32.91%	New
JD	Tabin Taki	2,350	30.92%	New
JP	Tagang Taki	210	2.76%	New
Margin of victory		19	0.25%	
Turnout		7,600	84.90%	
Registered electors		9,078		
INC win (new seat)				

== See also ==
- List of constituencies of the Arunachal Pradesh Legislative Assembly
- Siang district
- Pangin
- Boleng
