= Kecaikhati =

Indian goddess

Kecaikhati (lit. 'eater of raw flesh') is a prominent goddess from Northeast India. Her main shrine is considered to be the Tamreswari Temple, near Paya Reserve forest area in Arunachal Pradesh, next to Chunpura, close to Assam border along Sadiya - Tezu route; and she is referred to as Dikkaravasini in the 9th century Kalika Purana whose temple formed the eastern limit of Kamarupa. Unlike Kamakhya and Kamakhya Temple, which acquired Brahmin priests and became associated with the legendary Narakasura and the historical Kamarupa kings, Kecaikhati continued to remain outside the ambit of Brahminical influence and remained under the control of Deori priests during the time of the Chutia kingdom and after up to the present time.

Known as a particularly bloodthirsty goddess, Kecaikhati continued to receive human sacrifices during an annual festival and at calamitous times well after the Ahoms took over the Chutia kingdom in 1523 till the Ahom king Suhitpangphaa (1780–1795) or Gaurinath Singha banned the practice. Kecaikhati was the tutelary goddess of both the Chutia kingdom as well as the Dimasa kingdom. and the Ahom kingdom accorded the Deori priests special respect.

== Priesthood ==
The tribal priests of Kecaikhati are called Deori, who today form a community called the Deori people. Functionally, they are divided into four offices Bor Deori, Saru Deori, Bor Bharali and Saru Bharali. Only the Bor Deori and the Saru Deori entered the temple and offered worship using incantations which the common people did not understand. The two Bharalis collected tithes and procured offerings for the temple, including sacrifices. They are understood to have magical powers, and commoners often approached them for services. During the Ahom reign, all four offices had to approach the Ahom king to seek permission to perform the human sacrifice. The Kecaikhati temple, originally situated near Chunpura, was maintained by the Borgaya Deori clan.

The Deoris were the priests of two additional temples: the temple of Gira-Girasi (Old Ones, or Burha-Burhi in Assamese language), that was maintained by the Dibongia Deori with the original temple on the Kundil river or Dibang river; and the temple of Pisadema (Elder Son, or Boliya-hemata in Assamese) that was maintained by the Tengapaniya Deori with the original temple at Tengapani river.

== Origins and legends ==
Kecaikhati is noted to be a daughter of Bura-Buri and the younger sister of Pisadema. According to tradition, human sacrifices were first offered by Kecaikhati to Bura-Buri for introducing sin in this world—and over time, these sacrifices were offered to her instead. On account of her flesh-eating nature she is also called Pisashi after Pishachas, the flesh-eating demons of Hindu and Buddhist mythology.

In medieval period, her worship was related to power, warfare and royalty. Under Hindu influence she has come to be known by different names: Tamreswari in Sadiya by the Chutias, Ranachandi in Maibong by the Dimasas. To the Tai Khamtis, she might be known as Nang Hoo Toungh.
