= Pator-goya =

One of the major clans of the Deori tribe of India

Pator-goya is one of the four major clans into which the Deori tribe of India is divided. The other three major clans are Bo-geenya, Dibongia and Tengaponiya.

In ancient time, a section of Deori people lived in Pat-Sadiya in undivided Greater Assam, in north-east India. Later, they come to be known as Pator-goya clan of the Deori tribe. However, this clan has been lost after they faced with a riot in Sadiya, in the eastern region of undivided Greater Assam.

Some experts, like Bishnu Prasad Rabha, claim that the Patorgoyan clan assimilated with the Tiwa tribe in central Assam but there has been no scientific evidence to support the claim, which prompted a section of Deoris to begin a search. A preliminary investigation from 30 September to 5 October under the aegis of Jimachaya Giyan Aru Juktibadi Samaj has given a positive indication of the presence of Deori people in Kachin province and near Yangon in Myanmar. A team of researchers has decided to visit Myanmar in search of the lost clan.
