= Malinithan =

Archaeological site in Arunachal Pradesh, India

- Ruins of Malinithan

Religion
- Affiliation: Ethnic religion
- District: Lower Siang district
- Deity: Kechai-Khati/Pishasi (tribal goddess) (equivalent to Nang Hoo Toungh)

Location
- Location: Likabali
- State: Arunachal Pradesh
- Country: India
- Interactive map of Malinithan
- Coordinates: 27°39′24″N 94°42′21″E

Architecture
- Creator: Chutia kings

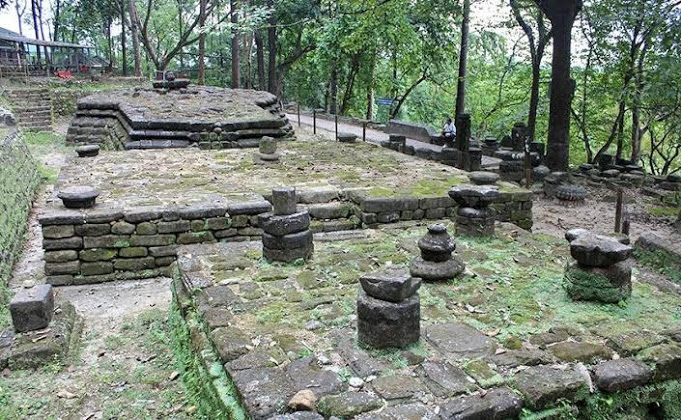
Malinithan temple complex

Malinithan is an archaeological site containing the ruins of an early medieval period temple on the northern bank of the Brahmaputra River in the Indian state of Arunachal Pradesh. It is assumed to be built by the Chutia kings in the 13th-14th century.

Kechai-Khaiti, a tribal goddess found among the Kachari groups or the Buddhist goddess Tara is considered to be the chief deity worshipped in the ruined temple. The worship of the goddess Kechaikheiti even after coming under Hindu influence was performed according to her old tribal customs. The goddess was taken care of by tribal priest known as the Deoris and was worshipped by the Borgoya khel of the Deoris. There were four different kinds of Deori priest who looked after the deity Kechaikhati. The Bar Bharali and the Saru Bharali collected dues of the temple and provides animals for sacrifice. The Bar Deori (Deori Dema) and the Saru Deori (Deori Surba) performs the sacrifice and sung hymns.

Some scholars identify Kesaikhaiti to the Tai Khamti female deity of Nang Hoo Toungh.

== Location ==
The Malinithan archaeological site is located at the base of the Siang mountains in the Likabali town and a sub-division of the Lower Siang district of Arunachal Pradesh. It is situated on a hill that rises to a height of 21 metres (69 ft), which affords a commanding view of the plains around it and of the Brahmaputra River.

== Legend ==
A legend was implanted around the site by Srimanta Sankardev in the 16th century, connecting the place to the mythological king of Bhishmaka (Lord of Vidarbha) of the epics. The association of the legend with the place led to a widespread renaming of the region.

As per the mythology constructed, when Krishna wanted to marry Rukmini, the daughter of King Bhishmaka of Vidarbha, he abducted her prior to her wedding with Shishupala. Krishna and Rukmini then travelled from Bhishmakanagar to Dwarka, stopping at Malinithan on the way over, where they were guests of Shiva and Durga, who were doing penance. Parvati, Shiva's consort, warmly welcoming her guests, presented them with garlands made of flowers plucked from her orchard.

== History ==
From all archaeological evidences at the site, archaeologists have opined that the temple belonged to the 13th century. Stonemason marks found in Malinithan were also found in other sites of Sadiya like Tamreswari temple, Bura-buri, Padum pukhuri as well as other places like Nakshaparbat and Buroi.

== Features ==
The archaeological excavations revealed a very well designed and carved plinth of a temple, 8 feet (2.4 m) high, with sculptures of deities and animals, designs of flowers, damaged columns and panels. Four sculptures of lions on two elephants were found at the four corners of the ruins of the temple.

Among the sculptures found at Malinthan, five notable ones carved out of granite stone are of Indra riding his mount Airavata, Kartikeya riding a peacock, Surya (Sun) riding a chariot, and Ganesha mounted over a mouse and a large Nandi bull. On the basis of the erotic Maithuna sculptures found here in different postures, it is believed that tantricism prevailed here as a fertility rite of the primitive tribal people who held the "mother principal as the procreative power of nature".

The temple is carved entirely out of stone, a type of temple known as Asmamayai. Iron dowels discovered in the ruins of the stone temple resembles the ones found in the Tamreswari temple of Sadiya, showing that it was probably built by the same people.

== Gallery ==
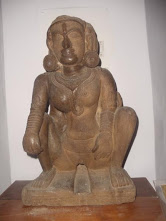
Malinithan Mother goddess sculpture

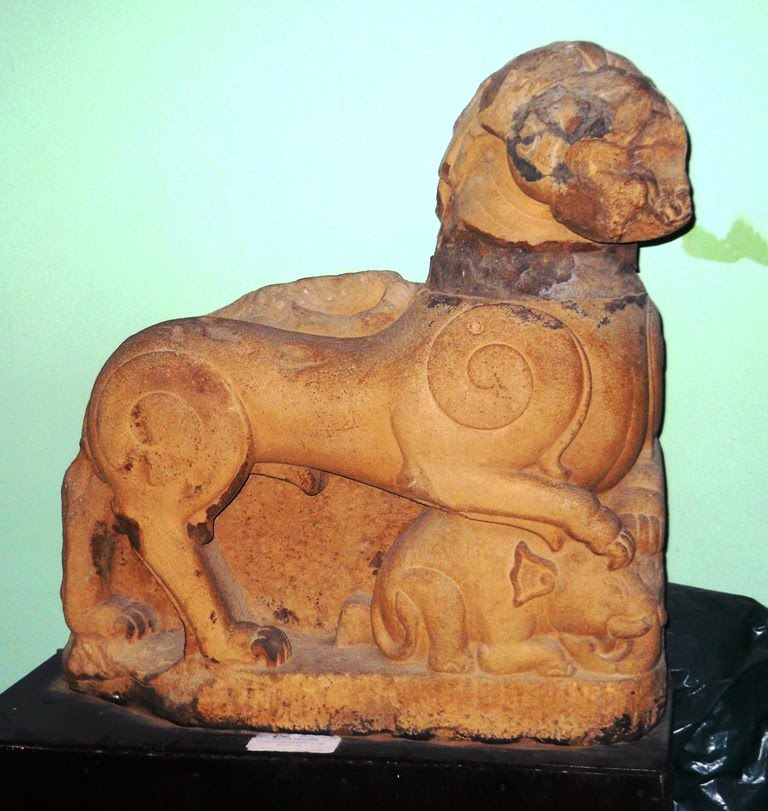
Gaja-singha of Malinithan

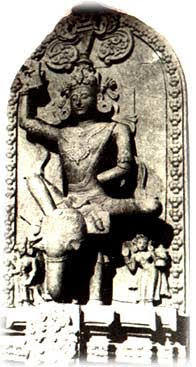
Malinithan Buddhist Tara sculpture

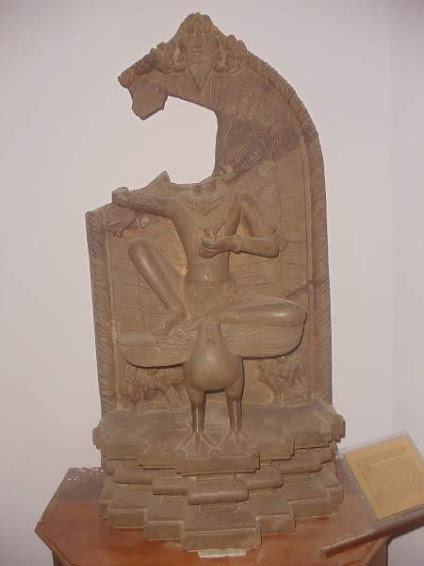
Malinithan Kartika sculpture

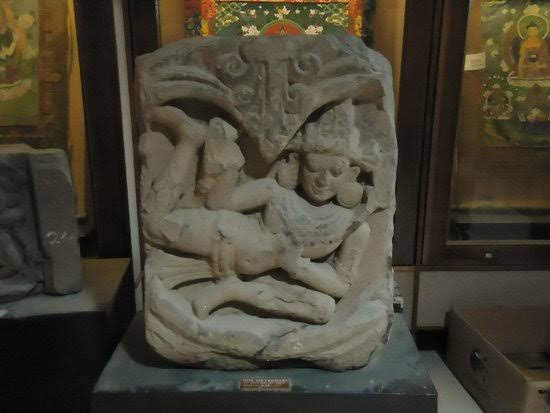
Malinithan Apsara sculpture

== Bibliography ==
- Shin, Jae-Eun (2023), Kecaikhaiti, Eater of Raw Flesh: A Profile of the Multifaceted Goddess in the North-East, Manohar Publishers & Distributors
- Laine, Nicolas (2019), Phi Muangs. Forces of the Place among the Khamti in Arunachal Pradesh
- Sali, M. L. (1 January 1998). India-China Border Dispute: A Case Study of the Eastern Sector. APH Publishing. ISBN 978-81-7024-964-1.
- Bhattacharjee, J. B. (1992), "The Kachari (Dimasa) state formation", in Barpujari, H. K. (ed.), The Comprehensive History of Assam, vol. 2, Guwahati: Assam Publication Board, pp. 391–397
- Dutta, Sristidhar (1985), The Mataks and their Kingdom, Allahabad: Chugh Publications
- Shin, Jae-Eun (2020). "Descending from demons, ascending to kshatriyas: Genealogical claims and political process in pre-modern Northeast India, The Chutiyas and the Dimasas". The Indian Economic and Social History Review. 57 (1): 49–75. doi:10.1177/0019464619894134. S2CID 213213265.
- Gogoi, Kakoli (2011). "Envisioning Goddess Tara: A Study of the Tara Traditions in Assam". Proceedings of the Indian History Congress. 72: 232–239. ISSN 2249-1937. JSTOR 44146715.
