= Sadiya Serpent Pillar =

Monument in India

Sadiya serpent pillar
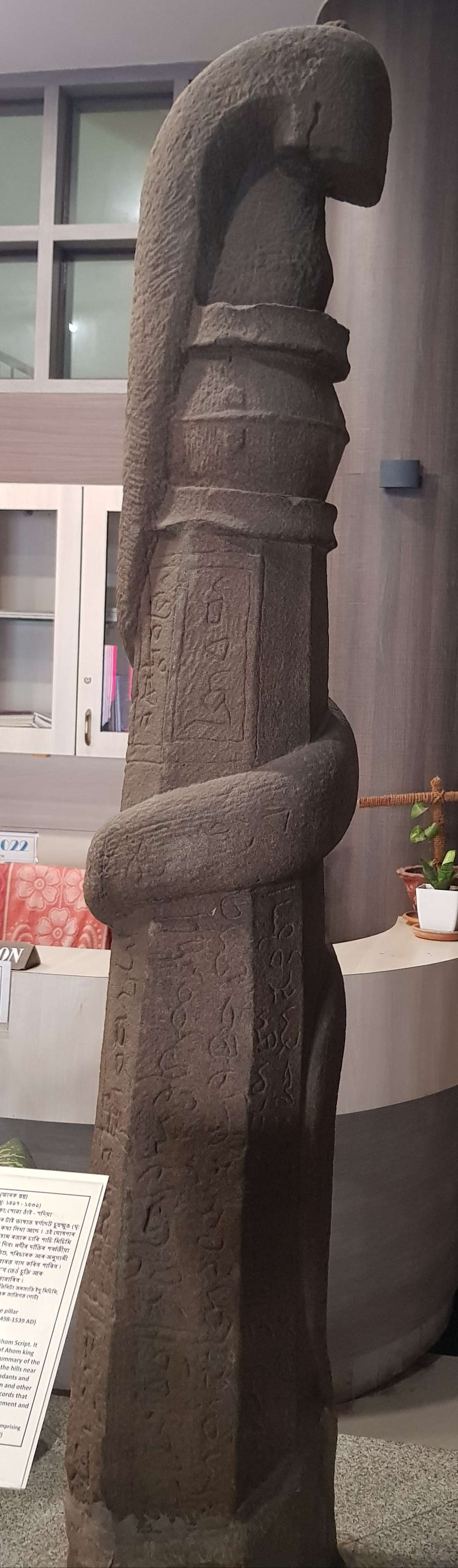
- Writing: Language; Tai language, Script; Ahom script
- Symbols: A pair of snakes biting their tails is twisted around it
- Created: Unknown, script inscribed in 1532; 494 years ago
- Discovered: Sadiya, between the Dibang and Deopani rivers
- Present location: Assam State Museum

Sadiya Serpent pillar, is a medieval octagonal stone pillar that contains the earliest example of Ahom script and the pillar is inscribed with the Ahom equivalent year of 1532 CE.

== Description and Location ==
As per the Assam Gazetteer (1928), the pillar was found between the Dibang and Deopani rivers, on the eastern side close to the seventh milepost of the road from Sadiya to Nizamghat. There was a stone bridge located nearby to the pillar and a road led from this bridge to a brick tank in the vicinity. The British explorer S. F Hannay found a brick gateway, stone bridge and a brick tank in the same region (between the Dibang and Deopani rivers), but fortified by tall ramparts.

Another British explorer T. Block found two similar octagonal stone snake pillars in the Tamreswari Temple. The writer T. Block describes:

"They (the pillars) were found in the north-eastern section of the enclosed area (of Tamreswari). I found two such bases, their shape is octagonal, 2 feet 6 inches in diameter, with a circular hollow inside; these rested on squares, with their corners cut off and differently moulded. The hemispherical capital measures 2 feet 4 inches in diameter at its base and is perforated by a hollow shaft 1 feet 10 inches land. Near the bottom, a pair of snakes biting their tails is twisted around it."

== Inscription ==
The stone pillar contains one of the earliest Ahom inscription founded to date inscribed in it, dated to 1532. The inscription dates to the reign of Suhungmung Dihingia Raja (1497–1539). Ahoms who captured Sadiya in 1524 and entered into a treaty with the local Mishmi tribe, the terms of the treaty were inscribed on an eleven feet high stone pillar. The epigraph consisting 9 and a half lines on the pillar is a proclamation issued by Phrasenmung Borgohain (Ahom governor of Sadiya) asking the Mishimis to pay annual tribute in certain articles and to dwell on one side of the Dibang River.

== Present ==
It was re-discovered in 1921 in Sadiya, removed from its original site in 1953, and placed in Assam State Museum and since then has been in display there.

== Gallery ==
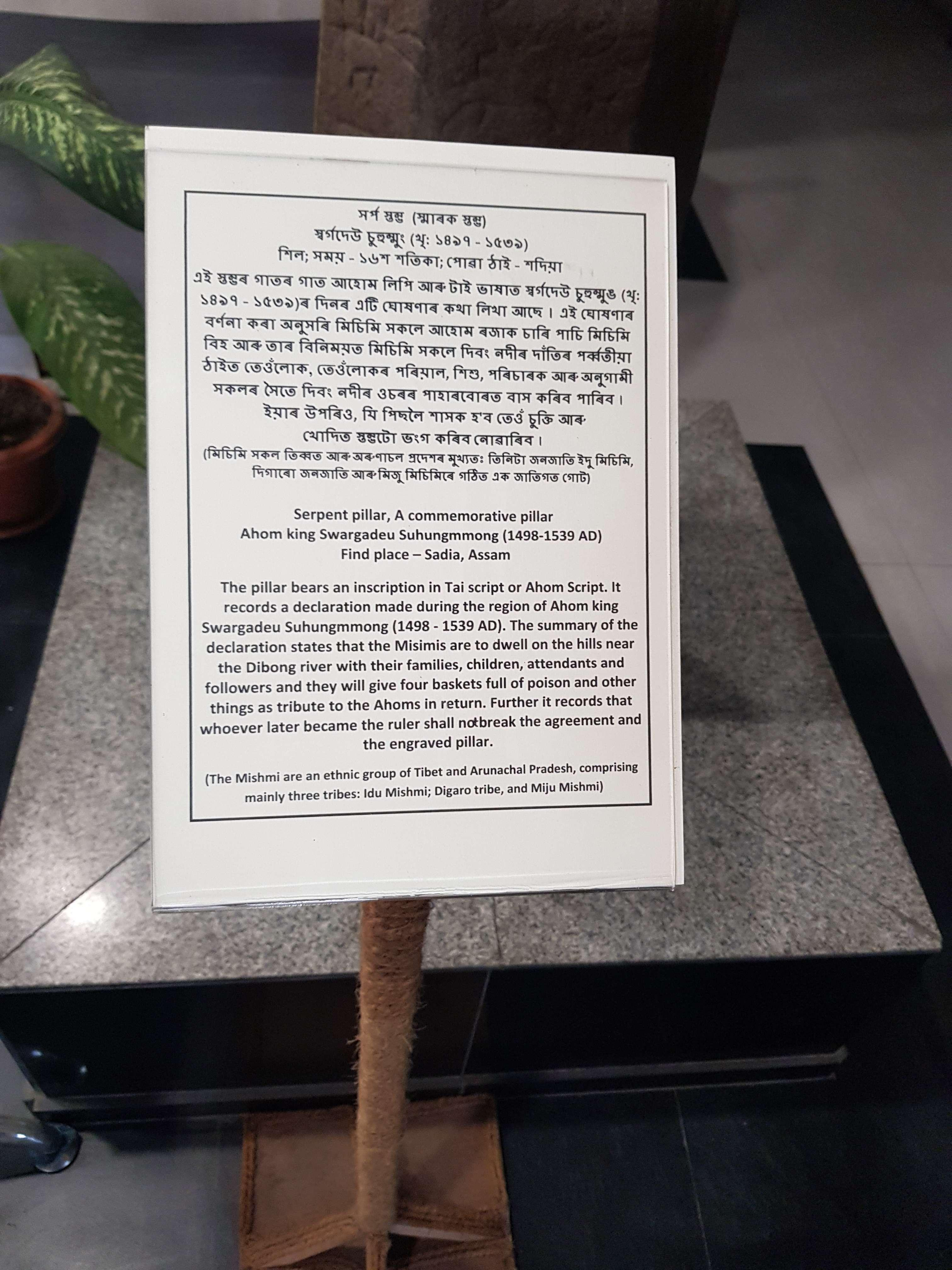
Caption about the Sadiya Serpent pillar in Assam State Museum.
