= Sadiya =

- town
- Nickname: Starting point of Assam
- Location in Assam, India Sadiya (India)
- Coordinates: 27.83°N 95.67°E
- Country: India
- State: Assam
- District: Tinsukia
- Elevation: 123 m (404 ft)

Languages
  - Official: Assamese
- Time zone: UTC+5:30 (IST)
- Postal code: 786157
- Vehicle registration: AS 23

Sadiya is a town in Tinsukia district, Assam, in India. It was the capital of the Chutia Kingdom but after the downfall of the kingdom, Prasengmung Borgohain was appointed as the Sadiya-khowa-Gohain of the Ahom kingdom. Extensive remains of buildings and fortifications built during the Chutia rule near Sadiya point to the importance of the region in the past. Historically Sadiya or Sadhaya referred to the Chutiya kingdom. It is claimed to be the center of development of the eastern Assamese dialects, the inscription here are written in a Tai script. Its stands on a grassy plain, almost surrounded by forested Himalayan mountains, on the right bank of Lohit River which is locally (but erroneously) considered the main stream of the Brahmaputra River. The deepest point of the Brahmaputra River is located near this village. It is famous for a flower named satphul (the word means "blessing" or a "desert flower"), which is much like Jasmine.

There are three possible routes from Sadiya to Tibet. The first route is through the valley of Dihang or Tsang Po. The second one through the Dibang valley and the third route through the Lohit valley which leads to Zayul province, the extreme south-eastern province of Tibet. It acted as a trade route which passed through the Shan state of Mongkawng and then finally reaches to Yunnan.

== Etymology ==
Historically, the region between the Lohit River and the Dibang River was known as Sadhayapura as per copper inscriptions. It is believed that Sadiya is a corrupted form of Sadhayapura.

== History ==
=== Early history ===
Based on inscription, it is assumed to be the capital of Chutiya king Lakṣmīnārāyaṇa of the early 15th-century.

In 1524, the Mongkawng or Nora king Phukloimung attacked Sadiya from what is today Myitkyina District of Myanmar but was defeated and pushed back.

=== Under Ahoms ===
After annexing the Chutia kingdom by Suhungmung Dihingia Roja in 1524, this place came under the domain of the Ahoms and Prasengmung Borgohain was appointed as the governor of the territory or Sadiya Khowa Gohain in 1524. Domains of Sadiya Khowa Gohain included the rivers of Lohit, Kundil, Dibang, Dikhari and the places of Kankham, Bardeoliyagoan, Nangkoa and the hills of Doidam and Chandangiri. The Sadiya Khowa Gohain had to maintained relations with the Adi, Mishmis and other hill tribes of the Sadiya frontier.

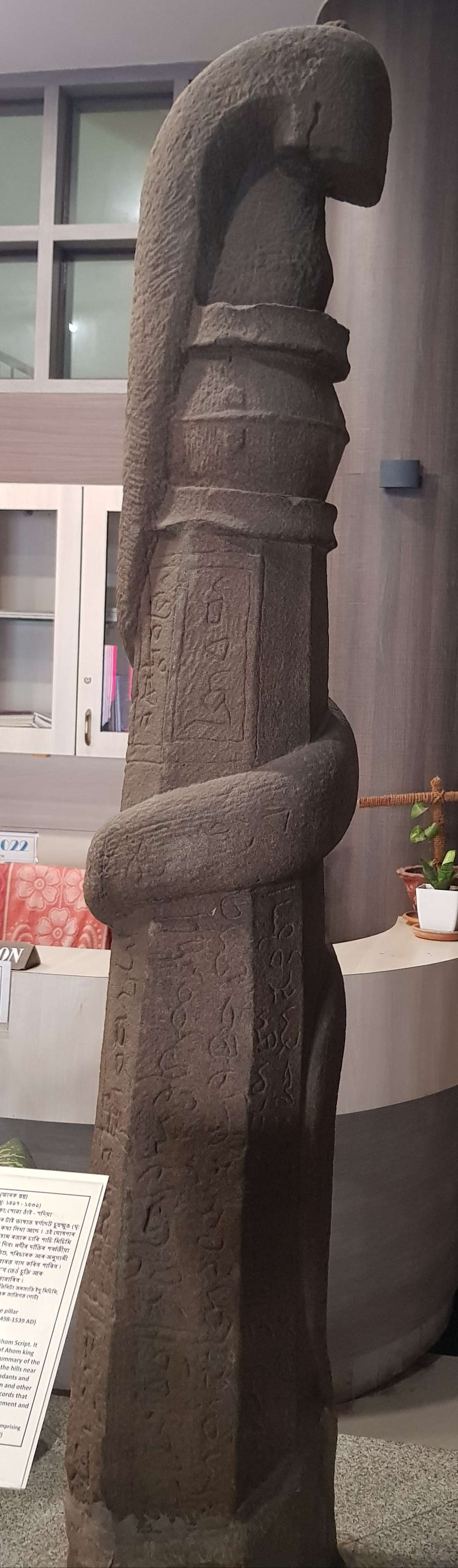
Sadiya Serpent Pillar, an ancient octagonal stone pillar on which Suhunmung (1497–1539) inscribed a few lines in Tai language of an agreement with the Mishmis to pay annual tribute

The headquarters of the Sadiya Khowa Gohain was at Kaicheng Goan where he constructed tanks and buildings, whose authority was extended to the river of Dihang on the west and river Tingrai in the east.

During the reign of Jayadhwaj Singha, Miri villages who indulged in lawless activities were suppressed in 1665. Also a number of Miri villages were reduced by Gadadhar Singha in 1683. In 1697, a great earthquake devastated Sadiya in which many hills were crumbled down.

In 1799, the Khamtis in league with the Phakials, Miris, Mishmis, Muluks, Khanghak, Pani Naras and Abors, created disturbance in Sadiya but were suppressed with harsh measures by Purnananda Burhagohain and were widely dispersed. Khamtis after their suppression in 1799 remained subdued for a time.

In 1799, the Khamtis in league with the Phakials, Miris, Mishmis, Muluks, Khanghak, Pani Naras and Abors, created disturbance in Sadiya but were suppressed with harsh measures by Purnananda Burhagohain and were widely dispersed. Khamtis after their suppression in 1799 remained subdued for a time.

During the Burmese invasion the Phakials which included Tai Khamti, Tai Khamyang, Tai Phakial, Tai Turung, Tai Aiton were asked by the Burmese army to return to Mogaung in Burma.

The Khamtis in allegiance with Singphos, ousted the last Sadiya Khowa Gohain, Govinda Gohain in 1810–11. From 1811, the Khamti chief Chao Salan Gohain became the new Sadiya-Khowa Gohain and later assisted in the Burmese invasion of Assam and in 1835 when Chao Salan Gohain died, Chao Rang Pha succeeded the Sadiya-Khowa Gohainship till its annexation by the British in 1839. British after their occupation of Assam in 1825, found that the Sadiya tract was entirely under Khamti control.

=== British period ===
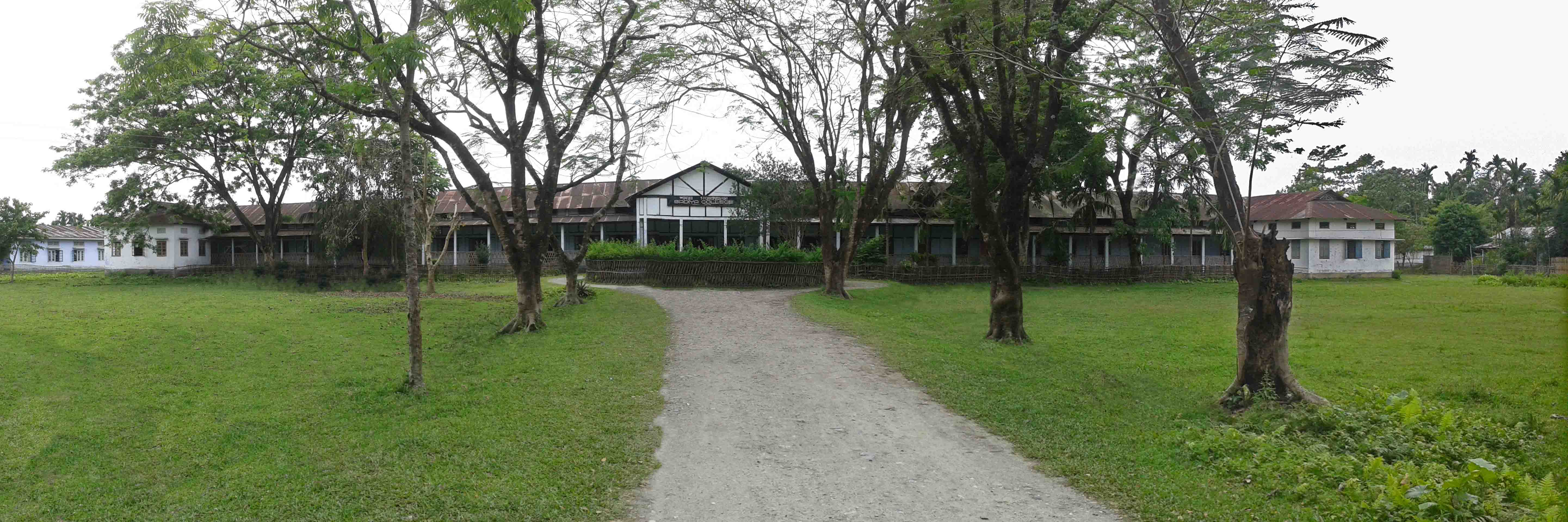
Sadia College.

Sadiya was the extreme north-east frontier station of British Raj, in the Lakhimpur district of Eastern Bengal and Assam regions. On the opposite bank is a railway station that used to connect with the Assam-Bengal line of that era. Sadiya had been garrisoned by detachments of native infantry and military police, and was the base of a chain of outposts. There had a bazaar, to which the hill-men beyond the frontier—Mishmis, Abors, and Khamtis—used to bring down rubber, wax, ivory, and musk, to barter for cotton cloth, salt and metal goods. In 1943–44 there was a United States Army Air Force (USAAF) field at Sadiya which hosted the 89th Fighter Squadron of the 80th Group, headquartered at Nagaghuli, now Chabua Air Base of the Indian Air Force. Sadiya today serves as one of the district headquarters for Indian Red Cross Society.

In 1882 Francis Jack Needham was appointed Assistant Political Agent for the British authorities after having served in the region as an assistant Superintendent of Police since 1876. He finally retired from service in 1905 after spending his life exploring above the Brahmaputra river and writing a treatise on the grammar of Miri, Singpho, and Khamti languages. He was awarded the Gill memorial medal in 1887 and made a fellow of The Royal Geographical Society in 1889. His main purpose in life was exploration partly in order to try and discover the source of the Brahmaputra river. His award of the Gill memorial Medal and F.R.G.S. was for penetrating into the Zayul Valley and into Tibet from Assam.

== Architecture and ruins ==
The entire area of Sadiya was a well developed city in the medieval times. The ruins like Bhismaknagar, Rukmininagar, Tamreswari temple, Pratima garh, Bura-buri temple built during the Chutia period.

=== Tamreswari (Kechai-Khati) Temple ===
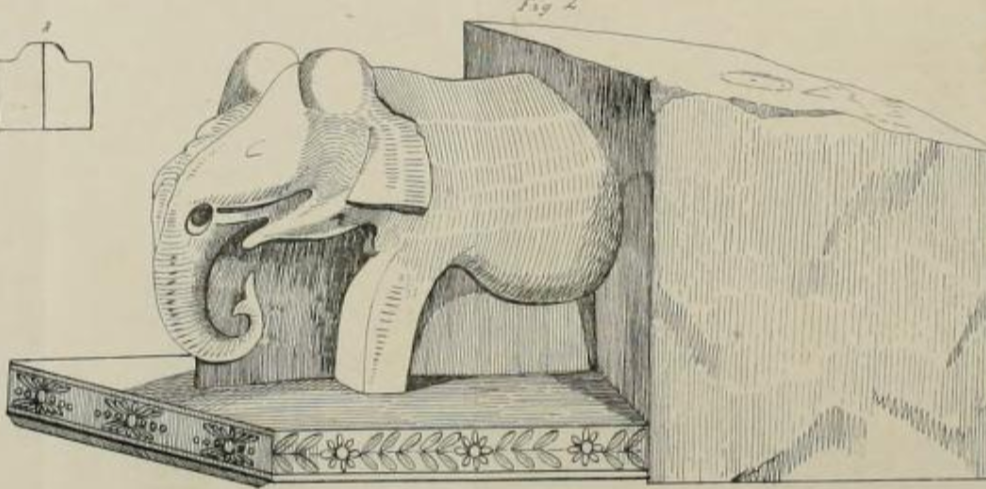
Sketch of an Elephant statue in Tamreswari Temple.

This was the most notable among the temples built by Chutia kings. The temple was dedicated to Kechaikhati (literal meaning: eater-of-raw-flesh), a primordial female tribal deity commonly found among other groups. The other name for Kechaikhaiti is Pishasi meaning "The Elder Daughter". Scholars assert that Kesaikhaiti is equivalent to the Tai-Khamti female deity Nang Hoo Toungh. The deity Pishasi or Kechaikhaiti is considered to be the daughter of Gira-Girasi and the younger sister of Pishadema. The temple was taken care of by the tribal priest known as the Deoris and was worshipped by the Borgaya Khel of the Deoris. When the British visited the temple complex, the main temples has disappeared and only a small square structure remained. The wall and doors of the temple were well designed with beautiful works. There were two giant elephant sculptures with silver tusks at the main door of the complex. The walls were made without any mortar and instead used iron dowels and brackets. The whole temple was surrounded with brick walls and on the western wall there was a place for human sacrifice. Although the temple is now completely submerged under marshy lands due to silt deposition in 1959, previous studies show that the main statues of the temple were built of sandstone and granite. The stone inscription found in the temple reads:

“Shiv-Charan-Prasadat Vridharajatan
Ya-Sri-srimata-Mukta Dharmanarayana
Shri shrimati Digaravasini Ichtaka
Di-Virchit-Prakara-Nivaddha
Krit Agrahainike Saka 1364”

— Tamreswari Wall inscription

The inscription describes that the walls of the temple have been built by the son Mukta Dharmanarayan of the old king (name not specified) in the Saka year 1364 (1442 AD).

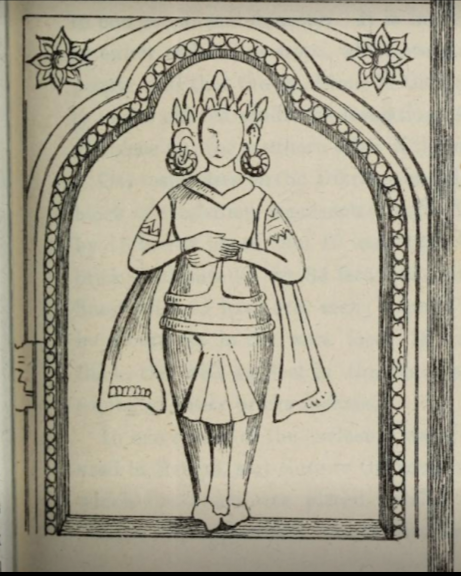
Sketch of a statue in Tamreswari Temple

The roof of the Tamreswari temple was originally sheeted with copper as mentioned in the Changrung Phukan Buranji (1711 AD), from which the name is derived. In 1848, when Dalton visited the site, he found a stone structure, but the copper roof was already removed. As per T. Block who visited the site in 1905, this square structure in the corner cannot have been the main building inside the complex and the brick wall evidently enclosed some sort of a grand temple in the center which has disappeared with time. According to S.F. Hannay, the temple complex was as near as possible square with the doorway to the west. There was a substantial brick wall, about 4.5 feet thick rising to the height of 8 feet, on the foundation of rudely cut blocks of sandstone. The entrance of the complex was on the west face, where there had been a stone enclosure and door. The ruins of the gateway which remains include the lintel carved on the edge in a chain of lotus flowers, some ornamented small pillars and an elephant statue. The three blocks forming the doorway, each of 7.5 feet long and 2 feet by 18 inches in girth, along with the blocks of the projecting wall, were reddish porphyritic granite of an adamantine hardness. There was another stone gateway at the southeast corner leading to the stream, in the bed of which are several carved and plain blocks of granite and sandstone. According to Debala Mitra(1956), the temple was originally Chaturayatana, i.e. having four shrines, built of sandstone and granite and located in the south-east section of the rectangular brick enclosure, prakara roughly measuring 208 ft by 130 ft. The compound wall was 4 feet wide and 8 feet tall and had a stone gateway on the eastern side. In the floods of 1959, due to deposit of silt in the banks of Paya river the structure was completely submerged in the waters.

=== Bura-Buri (Gira-Girasi) Than ===
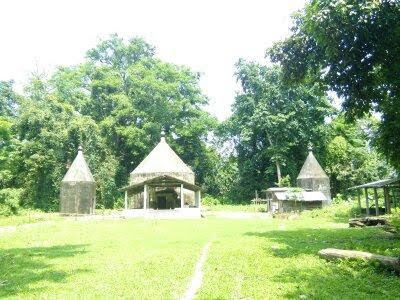
Bura Buri Temple

The Bura-Buri Than is another important temple built by the Chutia kings. It was dedicated to Primordial parents Gira-Girasi or Bura Buri (literal meaning: the-old-ones), which were later sanskritised as Shiva and Sakti. The two deities are also known as Kundil Mama. The temple was looked upon after by tribal priest called the Deoris and was worshipped by the Dibongia khel of the Deoris. Gira-Girasi or Bura-Buri are considered to be a wedded pair and are the parents of Pishasi or Kechaikhaiti and Pishadema. Although the structure has fallen due to natural calamities, the base still remains intact upon which a new temple has been built. The foundation is an octagonal shaped base made of stone with each edge spanning 3.4 meters in length. The temple was built using granite stone and fixed using iron dowels and brackets similar to the ones used in Malinithan and Tamreswari temple. The temple was surrounded by a wall built using bricks of 18–25 cm length and 12–17 cm breadth.

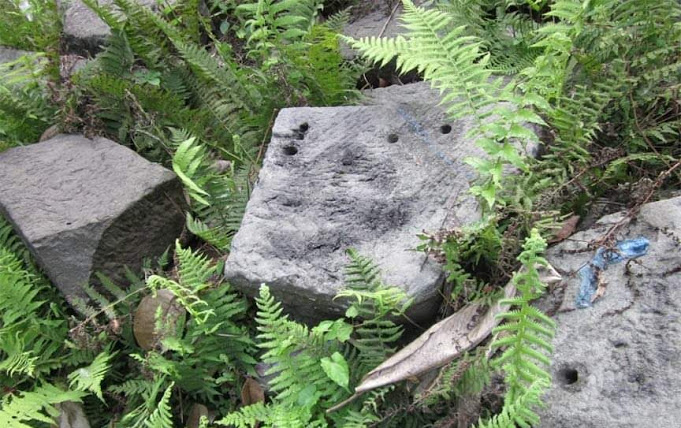
Granite stones used in Bura-buri Temple showing the holes for the iron brackets

=== Bhismaknagar Fort ===
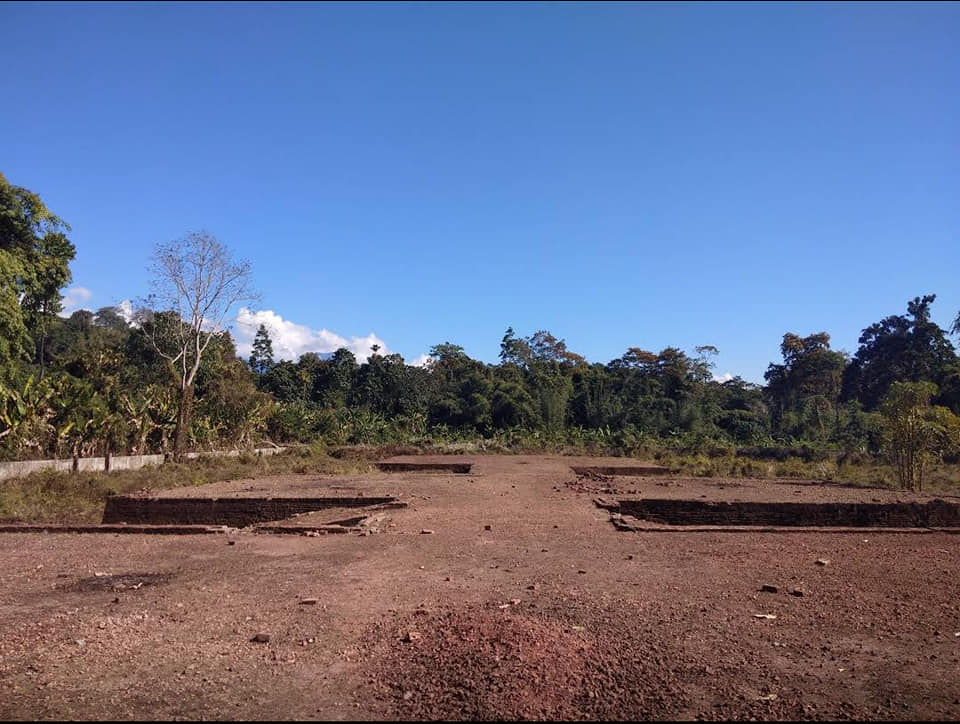
The three compartments of the central building

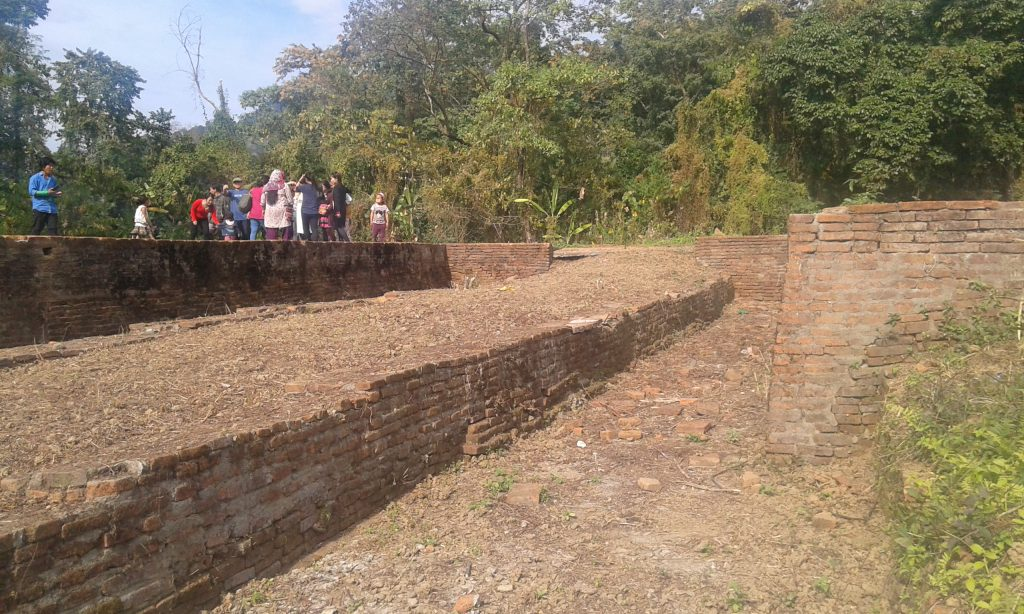
A section of the brick platform of Bhismaknagar

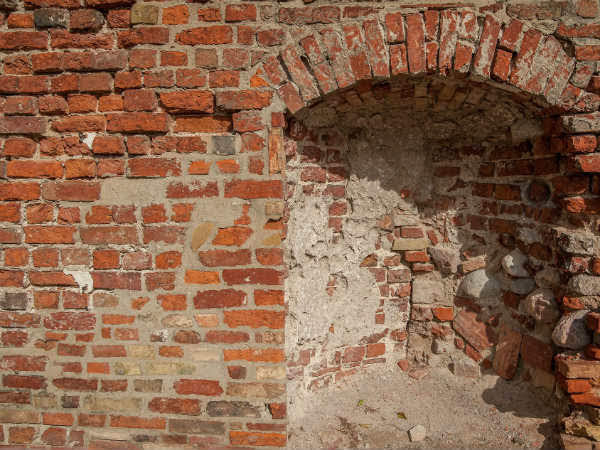
Ruins of a brick wall in Bhismaknagar

The Bhismaknagar Fort located in Roing is an important monument built by Chutia kings with the walls of the fort spread over 10 km^{2}. The name is derived from Bhishmaka of Vidarbha, the Hindu lineage created for the Chutias in the 16th-century Rukmimi-harana by Srimanta Sankardeva. A brick with the name of the Chutiya king Lakshminarayan indicates that the fort was repaired during the early 15th-century. The Bhismaknagar central complex extended over an area of 1860 square meters and displays three halls, six ingresses and two extension rooms. There is also a 2 meters high stone wall inside the complex. The architecture of the fort displays medieval culture. While quarrying in the fort, enormous pieces of work of art like potteries, terracotta figurines, terracotta plaques and decorative tiles were recovered.

Fabricated from the burnt bricks gave this fort an impressive and remarkable top view and thus explores the dexterity of people of ancient era. This fort can still be signified as a work of art.

The city's area is 10 square km. It is surrounded by a wall 4.5 meters high and 6 meters wide made using granite stone (6–9 courses) and bricks on the east, west and south directions. In the north, the Mishmi hills provided a natural barrier. Although very less excavation has been carried out by the Arunachal government, preliminary excavations have revealed three tanks and two gates in the eastern and western directions.

The Bhismaknagar central complex extended over an area of 1860 square meters and displays three halls, six ingresses and two extension rooms. There is also a 2 meters high stone wall inside the complex. The architecture of the fort displays the medieval culture. While quarrying the fort the enormous pieces of work of art like potteries, terracotta figurines, terracotta plaques and decorative tiles were preserved.

=== Rukmini Nagar ===
In the hills north of Roing lie scattered some old brick structures, mainly between the Chidu and Chimri villages situated at an altitude of about 305 m. The local people, the Idu Mishmi, were desirous of giving an Idu word to the name, and hence it came to be called Rukmini Nati (nati—the Idu word for bricks). An exploration-cum-excavation work, undertaken by the Research Department of the Government of Arunachal Pradesh, to study the ruins, has thrown some light on the antiquities. In course of the progress of work, which continued from January 1973 to April 1974, excavation of two mounds at Chimri, II km from Roing, unearthed two rooms, 10x10 m and 10x12 m respectively built on a slope, at a distance of 14 m from each other. The contents dug out from inside the walls of the rooms were of river-borne materials, a fact which suggests that they were destroyed by floods. The potsherds resembling those of Bhismaknagar in shape, fabric and technique that were unearthed bear ample evidence to the extension to this area of the same culture as of Bhismaknagar.

The other archaeological sites in this area are located (I) near Chidu Inspection Bungalow, (2) at Cheko Nati between Chidu and Chimri and (3) in the hills north of Chimri. No relics, however, could be found at the first two sites, although potsherds at Chidu and brick walls, steps, etc. at Cheko Nati were reported to have been seen earlier. The third site north of Chimri is situated at a high altitude of about 610 m. Not a single brick found there was in alignment, and everything seemed destroyed. The situation of all the four sites on a hilly terrain suitable for defence indicate that they are parts of a single complex representing a fort which extended from Chidu to Chimri. It is probable that the main centre of this complex was at Cheko Nati. Another archaeological site called Duku Limbo is on the left bank of the Dibang at'the foot of Elopa hill. The brickbats found at this site suggest that the Brismaknagar culture had extended to this point.

=== Tezu Fort ===
An old Mud Fort in the Tindolong area, six km from Tezu, was explored in 1972. It falls on the main road from Sadiya to Tezu. The area of the fort, enclosed by earthen ramparts—365.76 m X 350.52 m, is square in shape. The rampart is eight ft high, and equally broad at the top with sloping sides. On both the -inner and outer sides of the rampart run two ditches about 6 m wide. There is a prominent mound, circular in shape (diameter 30.48 m approximately) and about 3 m in height, almost at the centre of the enclosure. The mound appears to be a cavalier for lookout purposes. Some potsherds found at this site are too fragmentary to bear any conclusive evidence. It may, however, be assumed that the Mud Fort linked by the route from Bhismaknagar to Parshuram Kund was probably associated with the early culture that flourished in and around Sadiya and Bhismaknagar.

The complex seems to represent a defensive mud-fort or redoubt of a modest dimension unlike the fortified city of Bhismakanagara. It was suitable for a small band of soldiers to maintain vigilance against the enemies from their hide-outs inside jungle especially in guerilla warfare, the normal practice in the region. Scarp and counter-scarp provided by the rampart and ditches immensely strengthened the defence in the topography of the country. Strategic considerations are palpable from the situation of the fort on principal route from Sadiya and Bhismaknagar to Parshuram Kund facing the Lohit river, perhaps to keep watch on the enemy from its left bank around Chowkham and hence the position of the mound meant for this purpose nearer the river. The fort has been assigned roughly to a period about the 14th–15th century.

== Geography ==
Sadiya is located at 27.83°N 95.67°E. It has an average elevation of 123 m (404 ft). It is the only area of Assam where the newly described subspecies of hoolock gibbon, which is known as Mishmi Hills hoolock H. h. mishmiensis occurs.

== Politics ==
Sadiya is part of Lakhimpur (Lok Sabha constituency). Name of the assembly constituency is 126-Sadiya LAC.

Sadiya is one of the three Sub-Divisions of Tinsukia District. Chapakhowa is the centre of Sadiya. Sadiya is located under Tinsukia district of Assam and a legislative constituency contains 126 members of the legislative assembly. The only town under Sadiya assembly constituency is Chapakhowa town, with 10305 number of total population. According to 2011 census, Schedule Caste (SC) living in Sadiya is 2974 of which 1516 are male and 1458 are female and Schedule Tribe (ST) residing in Sadiya is 25167 of which 12908 are male and 12259 are female.

== See also ==
- Sati Sadhani
