= Rumgong Assembly constituency =

Legislative Assembly constituency in Arunachal Pradesh State, India

Coordinates: 28.31°N 94.89°E

Rumgong
- Constituency No. 32 for the Arunachal Pradesh Legislative Assembly

Constituency details
- Country: India
- Region: Northeast India
- State: Arunachal Pradesh
- District: Siang
- Lok Sabha constituency: Arunachal West
- Established: 1990
- Total electors: 12,689
- Reservation: ST

Member of Legislative Assembly
- 11th Arunachal Pradesh Legislative Assembly
- Incumbent Talem Taboh
- Party: Bharatiya Janata Party

Rumgong is one of the 60 Legislative Assembly constituencies of Arunachal Pradesh state in India.

It is part of Siang district and is reserved for candidates belonging to the Scheduled Tribes.

== Members of the Legislative Assembly ==
| Election | Member | Party |
|---|---|---|
| 1990 | Tamiyo Taga | Indian National Congress |
| 1995 | Dibang Tatak | Indian National Congress |
| 1999 | Tamiyo Taga | Indian National Congress |
| 2004 | Dibang Tatak | Indian National Congress |
| 2009 | Tamiyo Taga | Bharatiya Janata Party |
| 2014 | Tamiyo Taga | Bharatiya Janata Party |
| 2019 | Talem Taboh | Janata Dal |
| 2024 | Talem Taboh | Bharatiya Janata Party |

== Election results ==
=== Assembly Election 2024 ===
2024 Arunachal Pradesh Legislative Assembly election : Rumgong
| Party | Candidate | Votes | % | ±% |
|---|---|---|---|---|
| BJP | Talem Taboh | 5,862 | 52.48% | ▲4.51 |
| NPP | Taja Bonung | 4,680 | 41.89% | ▲39.19 |
| NCP | Tahan Mibang | 540 | 4.83% | New |
| NOTA | None of the Above | 38 | 0.34% | ▼0.19 |
| Margin of victory | | 1,182 | 10.58% | ▲9.74 |
| Turnout | | 11,171 | 88.04% | ▼1.82 |
| Registered electors | | 12,689 | | ▲12.43 |
| BJP gain from JD(U) | | Swing | ▲3.67 | |

=== Assembly Election 2019 ===
2019 Arunachal Pradesh Legislative Assembly election : Rumgong
| Party | Candidate | Votes | % | ±% |
|---|---|---|---|---|
| JD(U) | Talem Taboh | 4,949 | 48.80% | New |
| BJP | Tamiyo Taga | 4,864 | 47.96% | ▼2.92 |
| NPP | Tahang Taggu | 274 | 2.70% | New |
| NOTA | None of the Above | 54 | 0.53% | ▲0.20 |
| Margin of victory | | 85 | 0.84% | ▼1.26 |
| Turnout | | 10,141 | 89.85% | ▲4.35 |
| Registered electors | | 11,286 | | ▲6.54 |
| JD(U) gain from BJP | | Swing | ▼2.08 | |

=== Assembly Election 2014 ===
2014 Arunachal Pradesh Legislative Assembly election : Rumgong
| Party | Candidate | Votes | % | ±% |
|---|---|---|---|---|
| BJP | Tamiyo Taga | 4,609 | 50.88% | ▲12.12 |
| INC | Talem Taboh | 4,419 | 48.79% | ▲19.65 |
| NOTA | None of the Above | 30 | 0.33% | New |
| Margin of victory | | 190 | 2.10% | ▼5.78 |
| Turnout | | 9,058 | 85.51% | ▲4.30 |
| Registered electors | | 10,593 | | ▼8.84 |
| BJP hold | | Swing | | |

=== Assembly Election 2009 ===
2009 Arunachal Pradesh Legislative Assembly election : Rumgong
| Party | Candidate | Votes | % | ±% |
|---|---|---|---|---|
| BJP | Tamiyo Taga | 3,658 | 38.77% | ▲22.42 |
| JD(U) | Karma Jerang | 2,915 | 30.89% | New |
| INC | Dibang Tatak | 2,749 | 29.13% | ▼15.61 |
| NCP | Tayu Jerang | 114 | 1.21% | New |
| Margin of victory | | 743 | 7.87% | ▲2.04 |
| Turnout | | 9,436 | 81.20% | ▲3.28 |
| Registered electors | | 11,620 | | ▲8.27 |
| BJP gain from INC | | Swing | ▼5.98 | |

=== Assembly Election 2004 ===
2004 Arunachal Pradesh Legislative Assembly election : Rumgong
| Party | Candidate | Votes | % | ±% |
|---|---|---|---|---|
| INC | Dibang Tatak | 3,742 | 44.74% | ▼10.86 |
| Independent | Tamiyo Taga | 3,254 | 38.91% | New |
| BJP | Karma Jerang | 1,367 | 16.35% | New |
| Margin of victory | | 488 | 5.84% | ▼12.90 |
| Turnout | | 8,363 | 73.10% | ▼2.37 |
| Registered electors | | 10,732 | | ▲18.86 |
| INC hold | | Swing | | |

=== Assembly Election 1999 ===
1999 Arunachal Pradesh Legislative Assembly election : Rumgong
| Party | Candidate | Votes | % | ±% |
|---|---|---|---|---|
| INC | Tamiyo Taga | 4,031 | 55.60% | ▲9.26 |
| AC | Dibang Tatak | 2,673 | 36.87% | New |
| NCP | Karma Jerang | 546 | 7.53% | New |
| Margin of victory | | 1,358 | 18.73% | ▲15.66 |
| Turnout | | 7,250 | 81.89% | ▼7.74 |
| Registered electors | | 9,029 | | ▲26.97 |
| INC hold | | Swing | | |

=== Assembly Election 1995 ===
1995 Arunachal Pradesh Legislative Assembly election : Rumgong
| Party | Candidate | Votes | % | ±% |
|---|---|---|---|---|
| INC | Dibang Tatak | 2,901 | 46.34% | ▲8.08 |
| JD | Tamiyo Taga | 2,709 | 43.27% | ▲27.60 |
| Independent | Talong Taggu | 650 | 10.38% | New |
| Margin of victory | | 192 | 3.07% | ▼8.28 |
| Turnout | | 6,260 | 88.62% | ▲7.42 |
| Registered electors | | 7,111 | | ▼21.04 |
| INC hold | | Swing | | |

=== Assembly Election 1990 ===
1990 Arunachal Pradesh Legislative Assembly election : Rumgong
| Party | Candidate | Votes | % | ±% |
|---|---|---|---|---|
| INC | Tamiyo Taga | 2,778 | 38.26% | New |
| Independent | Karma Jerang | 1,954 | 26.91% | New |
| JD | Tayi Gaduk | 1,138 | 15.67% | New |
| Independent | Taje Komut | 786 | 10.83% | New |
| Independent | Taka Padung | 604 | 8.32% | New |
| Margin of victory | | 824 | 11.35% | |
| Turnout | | 7,260 | 81.50% | |
| Registered electors | | 9,006 | | |
| INC win (new seat) | | | | |

== See also ==
- Kaying
- List of constituencies of the Arunachal Pradesh Legislative Assembly
- Rumgong
- Siang district
