= Chapakhowa =

Town in Assam, India

Coordinates: 27.918°N 95.766°E

Chapakhowa is a town in Assam, India. It is the centre of the Sadiya sub-division in the Tinsukia district. The name Chapakhowa came from the Deori word Sepa haba meaning Owtenga khowa in Assamese.

Sadiya College is located in this area. The town also has a school named the Sadiya Model Government Higher Secondary.

Education in the area include Sadiya college, Sadiya Government Model High School, Town High school, ME school, and Adarsha Vidyalaya.

St Thomas High School an English Medium school is situated 3 km away from Chapakhowa.
