= Boleng =

Town in Arunachal Pradesh, India

Coordinates: 28.335°N 94.961°E

Boleng is a town in Siang district, lying on the banks of Siang River in the Indian state of Arunachal Pradesh. It is the headquarters of the newly created Siang District, which was bifurcated from West Siang and East Siang. It is located about 100 km from Pasighat, East Siang district of Arunachal Pradesh. The district is named after the Brahmaputra, locally known as Siang.

== Culture ==
The people of Boleng celebrate a variety of festivals. Solung, Aran, Etor etc are important festivals here. Legend has it that Solung, which is the principal festival of the Adis, came into existence when the Goddess of Wealth, Kiine-Naane asked them in person to carry out the worship or 'puja'.

Solung is celebrated by the Adis for five days. The first day or the Solung Gidi Dogin is the day when they prepare for this event. Doreph Long, the second day is the day of animal slaughters. Binnyat Binam or the third day is the day of prayers. Taktor of Ekoph is the fourth day and on this day arms and ammunition are manufactured. Miri or the fifth day is the day of farewell. The songs that are sung during Solung are the lyrics of Solung Abang that show the life of humans, animals, plants, etc. Solung is celebrated in the month of September.

Popular dances in Boleng include the Ponung dance and the war dance called Taapu. Boleng is also ideal for adventure sports activities. The archaeological site of Malinithan (200 km) in the neighbouring West Siang district is linked to the legend of Lord Krishna and his wife Rukmini. The severed head of Sati (Parvati) is said to have fallen at Akashiganga (100 km) according to ancient Hindu mythology.

== Languages ==
The main language spoken in the area is Adi. Other languages include Hindi, Assamese, Nepali, etc.

== Connectivity ==
The town is connected to Pasighat and Along by daily private sumo service. The nearest railway station is Murkongselek railway station in Dhemaji district, Assam.

== Demographics ==
As of the Census of India 2011, Boleng had a population of 5,776. Males constitute 51.3% of the population and females 48.7%. Boleng has an average literacy rate of 79%, higher than the national average of 59.5%: male literacy is 53.6%, and female literacy is 46.4%.

== Climate ==
Climate data for Boleng
Month	Jan	Feb	Mar	Apr	May	Jun	Jul	Aug	Sep	Oct	Nov	Dec	Year
Record high °C (°F)	26.8 (80.2)	29.3 (84.7)	33.3 (91.9)	33.9 (93.0)	36.2 (97.2)	36.9 (98.4)	37.1 (98.8)	36.4 (97.5)	36.4 (97.5)	34.2 (93.6)	30.4 (86.7)	26.3 (79.3)	37.1 (98.8)
Mean daily maximum °C (°F)	20.1 (68.2)	20.9 (69.6)	23.0 (73.4)	25.2 (77.4)	27.5 (81.5)	28.9 (84.0)	29.0 (84.2)	29.7 (85.5)	30.0 (86.0)	27.2 (81.0)	24.4 (75.9)	21.6 (70.9)	25.6 (78.1)
Daily mean °C (°F)	15.8 (60.4)	17.0 (62.6)	19.3 (66.7)	21.7 (71.1)	24.2 (75.6)	26.0 (78.8)	26.4 (79.5)	26.9 (80.4)	26.1 (79.0)	23.8 (74.8)	20.3 (68.5)	17.2 (63.0)	22.1 (71.7)
Mean daily minimum °C (°F)	11.2 (52.2)	12.9 (55.2)	15.6 (60.1)	18.3 (64.9)	21.0 (69.8)	23.6 (74.5)	24.4 (75.9)	24.6 (76.3)	23.6 (74.5)	20.5 (68.9)	15.9 (60.6)	12.4 (54.3)	18.7 (65.6)
Record low °C (°F)	3.8 (38.8)	4.9 (40.8)	8.0 (46.4)	10.1 (50.2)	14.4 (57.9)	18.9 (66.0)	21.4 (70.5)	20.7 (69.3)	18.1 (64.6)	12.7 (54.9)	7.0 (44.6)	3.9 (39.0)	3.8 (38.8)
Average precipitation mm (inches)	69.6 (2.74)	147.8 (5.82)	355.9 (14.01)	558.3 (21.98)	561.6 (22.11)	583.4 (22.97)	552.4 (21.75)	395.1 (15.56)	415.6 (16.36)	162.7 (6.41)	37.4 (1.47)	30.6 (1.20)	3,870.4 (152.38)
Average rainy days (≥ 2.5 mm)	5.5	8.2	13.8	16.6	18.9	22.9	24.2	22.2	18.0	8.5	2.6	2.9	164.3
Average relative humidity (%) (at 17:30 IST)	71.9	74.9	77.2	80.6	83.9	88.2	89.8	87.7	85.7	77.7	72.6	71.7	80.2
Average dew point °C (°F)	10.3 (50.5)	12.1 (53.8)	14.8 (58.6)	18.0 (64.4)	21.1 (70.0)	23.7 (74.7)	24.5 (76.1)	24.6 (76.3)	23.3 (73.9)	19.4 (66.9)	14.8 (58.6)	11.6 (52.9)	18.2 (64.7)
Mean monthly sunshine hours	279.3	246.4	257.4	252.2	269.2	229.0	203.0	240.6	242.4	288.6	273.7	274.9	3,056.7
Percentage possible sunshine	85.0	78.0	69.0	65.0	64.0	55.0	48.0	59.0	66.0	81.0	85.0	85.0	70.0
Source: Open-meteo.com Normals (1991-2020)

== Gallery ==
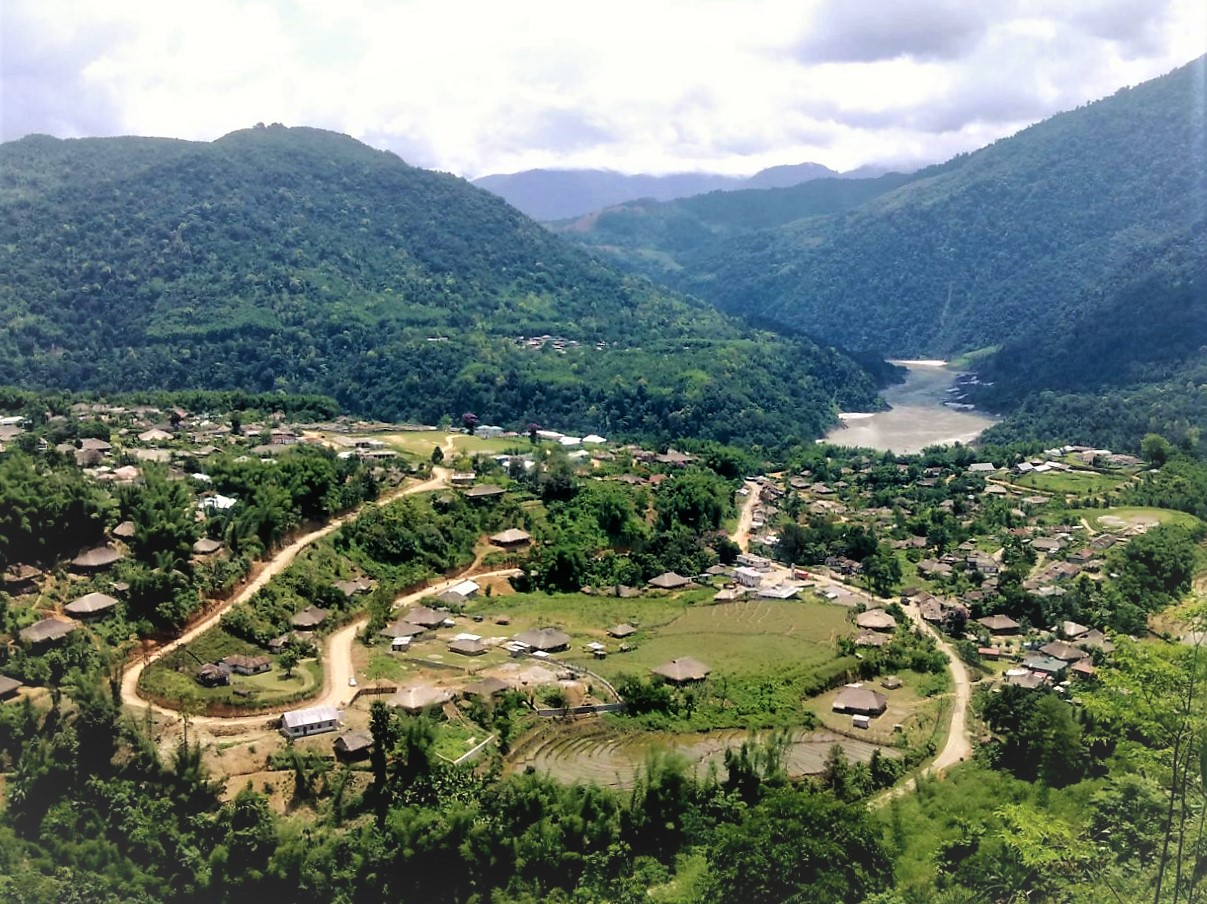
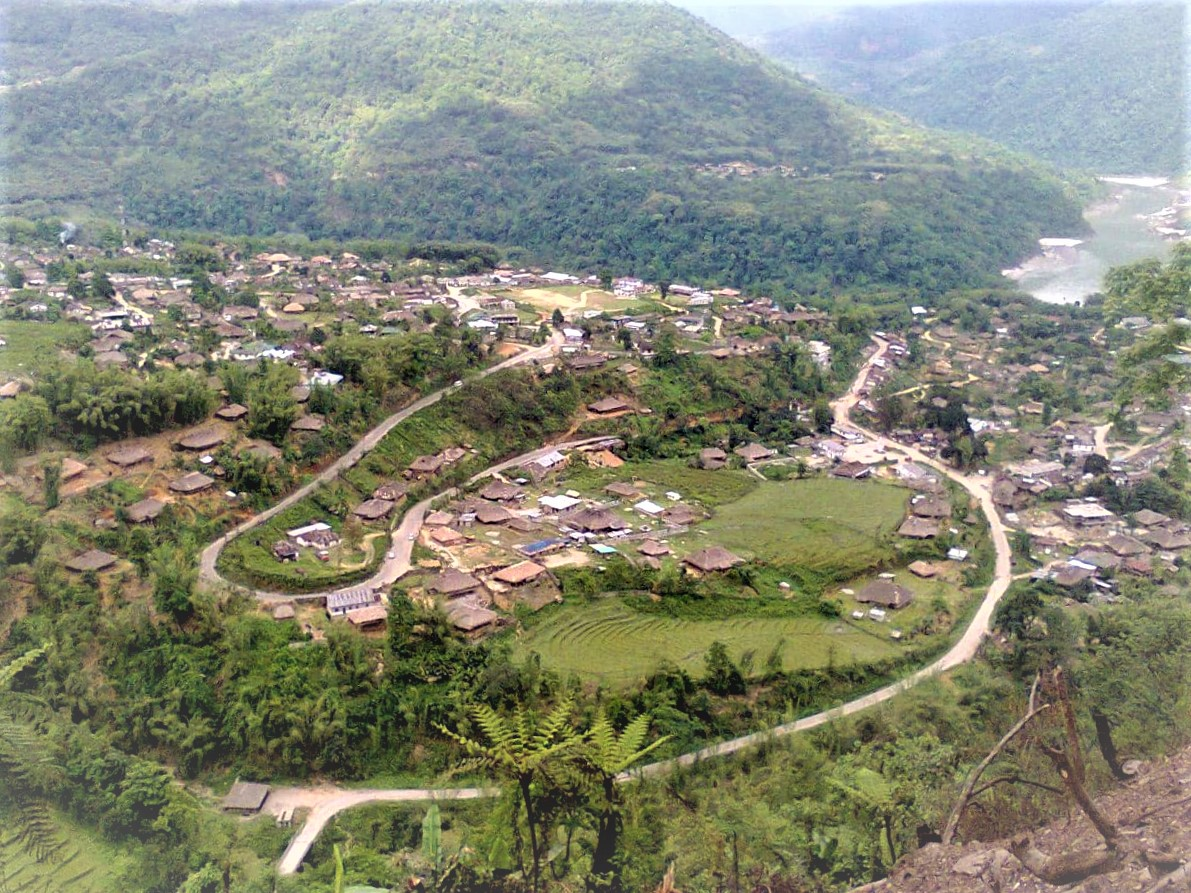
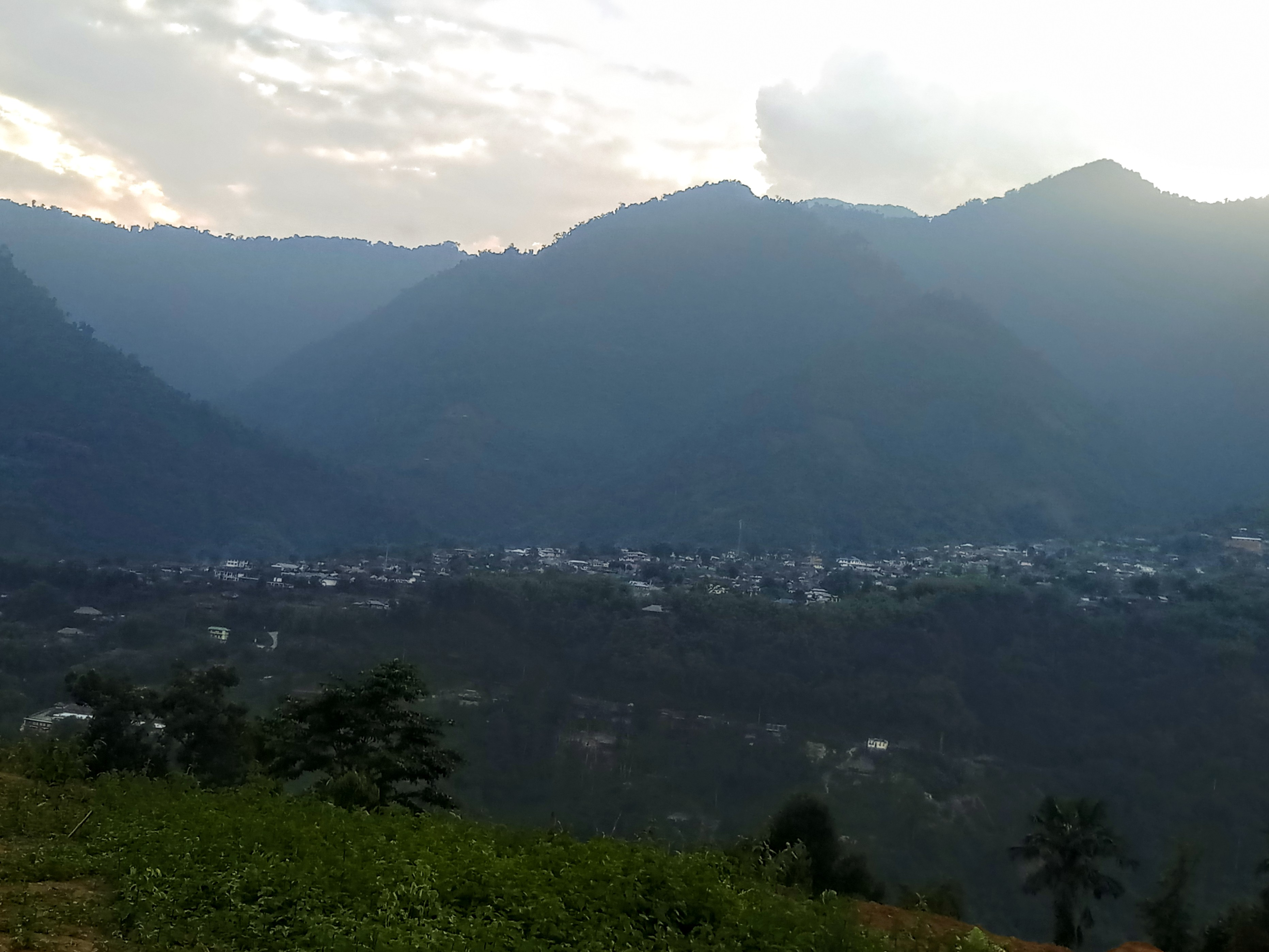
