= Bhismaknagar =

Archeological site in Arunachal Pradesh, India

- A brick found in Bhismaknagar Fort
- Interactive map of Bhismaknagar
- 28°02′48.2″N 96°0′20.7″E
- Type: Settlement
- Location: Lower Dibang Valley district, Arunachal Pradesh, India

History
- Built: 8th century
- Abandoned: 16th century

Site notes
- Material: Bricks, Stone, Soil
- Length: 4.5 km
- Width: 2.5 km

Bhismaknagar is an archeological site in Indian state of Arunachal Pradesh. It is located near Roing in Lower Dibang Valley district. The remains are generally ascribed to the rule of the Sutiyas, a Tibeto-Burmese ethnic group who ruled over the region of Sadiya from 11th to 16th Century CE.

== Etymology ==
The name Bhismaknagar was first observed in the Assam District Gazetteer of the year 1928—reference to a work by the 16th-century seer Sankardev that was popular in the Sadiya region (which eventually found its way into the later Chutia chronicles.) (Note: Among many works of Śankaradeva, the Rukmiṇiharaṇa, the poem of Rukmimi and Krishna, gained considerable popularity in the Sadiya area and influenced its regional identity construction. Rukmiṇī, in this poem, was a daughter of king Bhīṣmaka.The Bhīṣmaka lineage became a part of the new literary tradition of the region and eventually found its way into the later Chutiya chronicles.)

Historically, the region was known as Sadhayapura (the rulers being Sadhayapur-ishwar) as per copper inscriptions and the fort formed part of the capital region of the Chutia king Laksminarayana, also known as Che-lung in Tai Buranjis (meaning "Great City" in English).

== Location ==
It is located in Lower Dibang Valley district. The campus of the old city is spread over an area of 2500 acres.

== History ==
Bhismaknagar is an important ancient archeological site. The site was one of the stronghold of the Chutia Kingdom. The ruins have been dated between the 11th-15th centuries. Bhismaknagar has been identified with Sadhayapuri (or Svadhayapuri), the political centre of the Chutia Kingdom. Based on an inscriptions on brick, it is assumed to have been the capital of Chutia king Lakṣmīnārāyaṇa, of the early 15th century. Paleographical analysis supports this dating.

== Architecture ==
The fort, with its fortifications and buildings, is built of fired bricks. The fortified city is spread over an area of 10 square km. The wall, spread on the east, west and south directions, is 4.5 meters high and 6 meters wide, made using granite stone (6-9 courses) and bricks. In the north, the Mishmi hills provided a natural barrier. Although very less excavation has been carried out by the Arunachal government, preliminary excavations have revealed three tanks and two gates in the eastern and western directions.

The Bhismaknagar central complex extended over an area of 1860 square meters and displays three halls, six ingresses and two extension rooms. There is also a 2 meters high stone wall inside the complex. The architecture of the fort displays the medieval culture. While quarrying the fort the enormous pieces of work of art like potteries, terracotta figurines, terracotta plaques and decorative tiles were preserved.

== Gallery ==
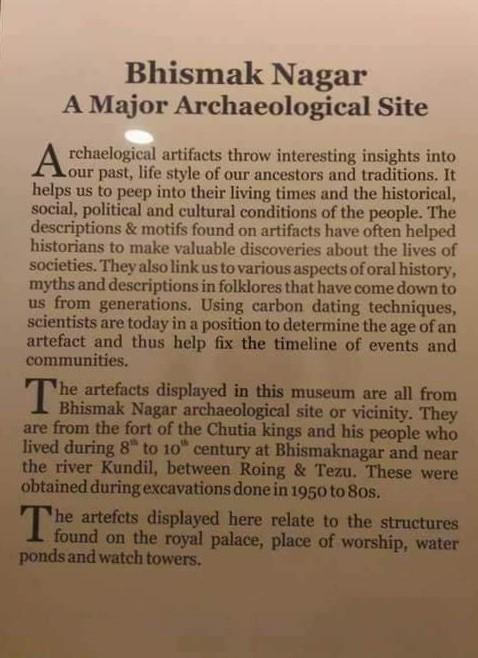
Museum sign

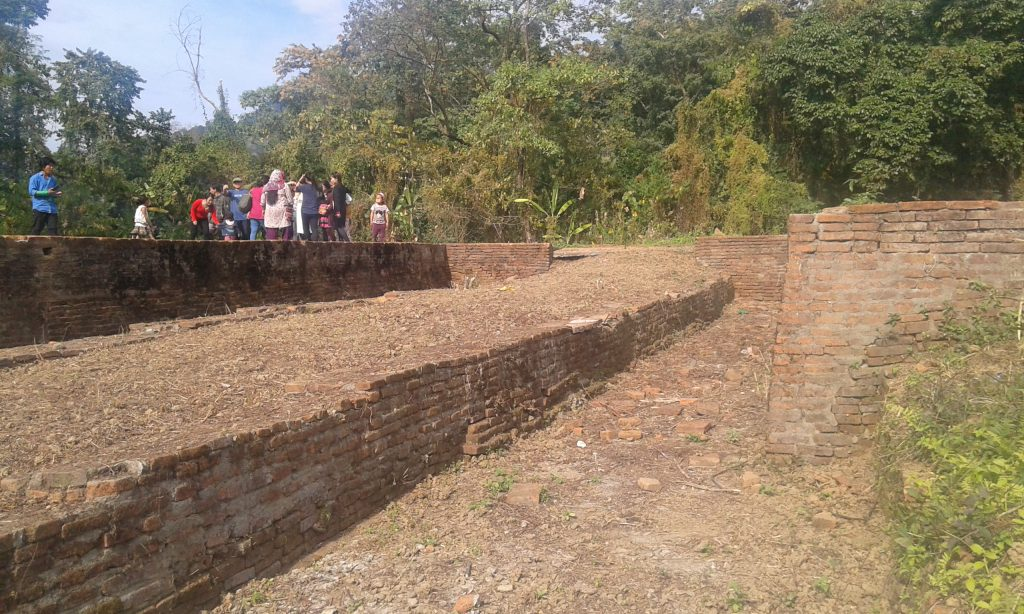
A section of the brick platform of Bhismaknagar.

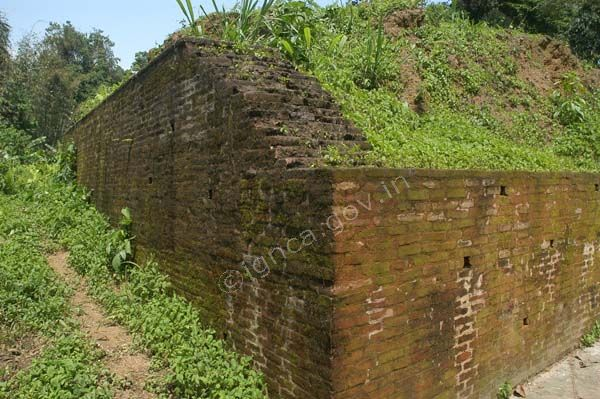
Section of the fortified brick wall leading to the western gateway.

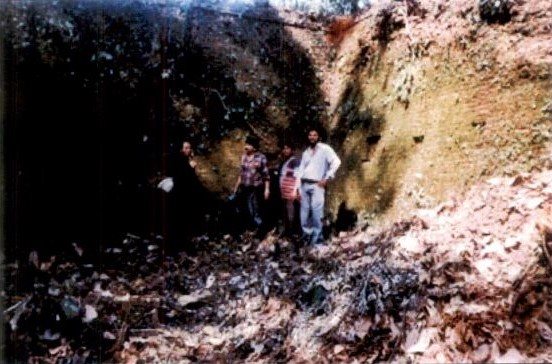
A section of the eastern brick gateway of the city.

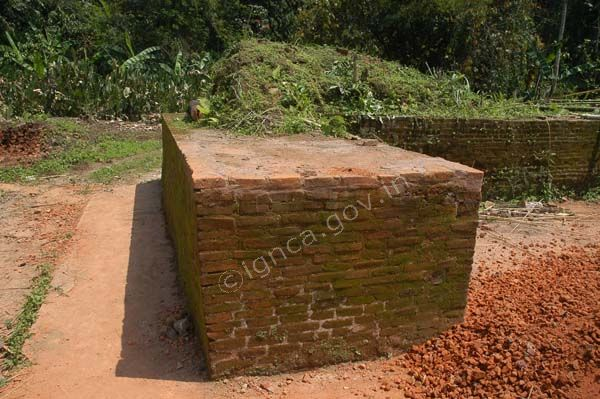
A section of the western gateway with the upper damaged portion of the wall removed.

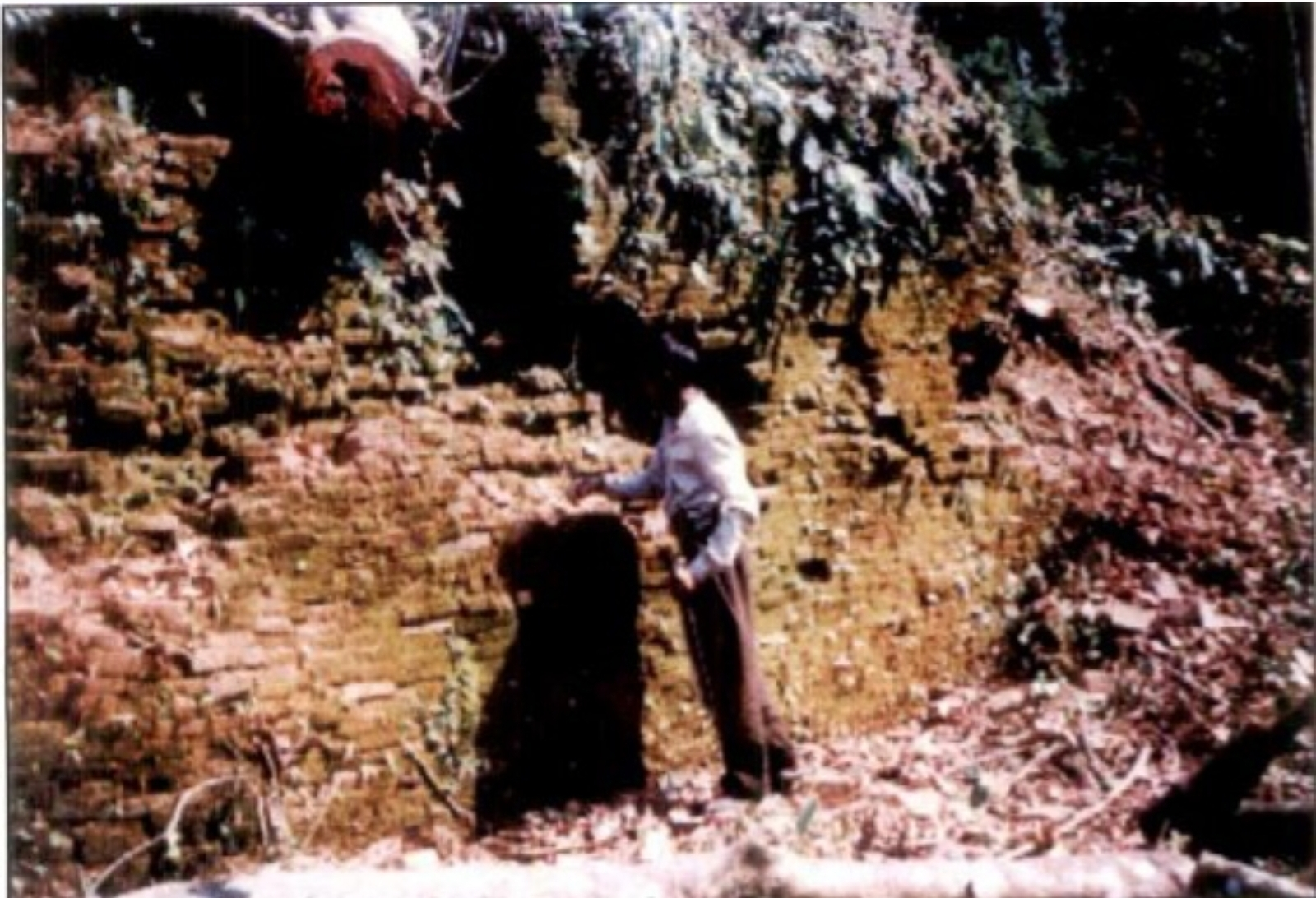
A section of the brick wall leading to the eastern gateway.

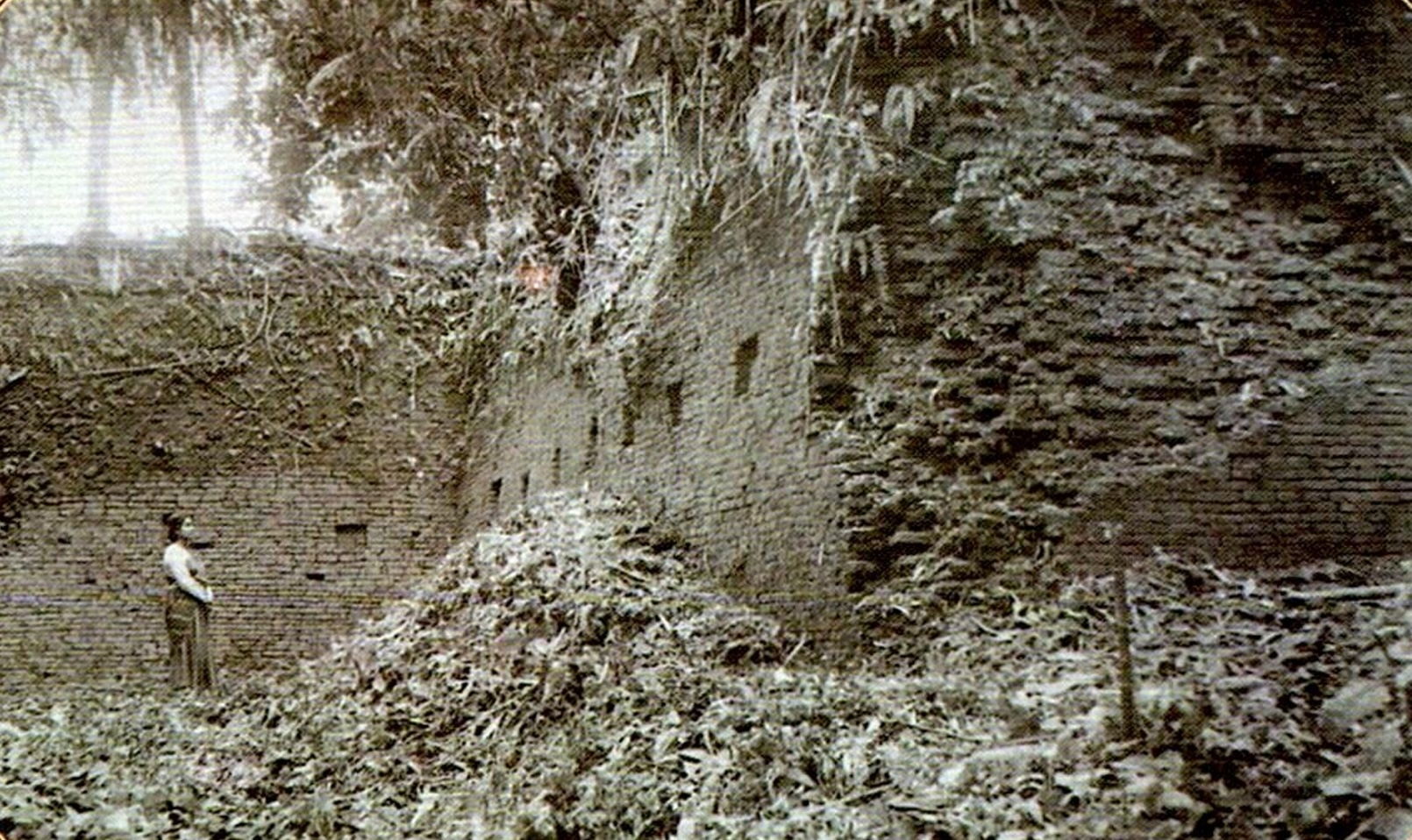
Archival photo of Eastern Gate of Bhismaknagar

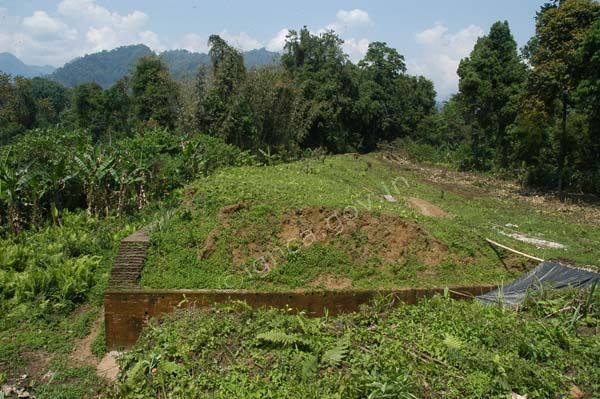
Another section of the Western wall.

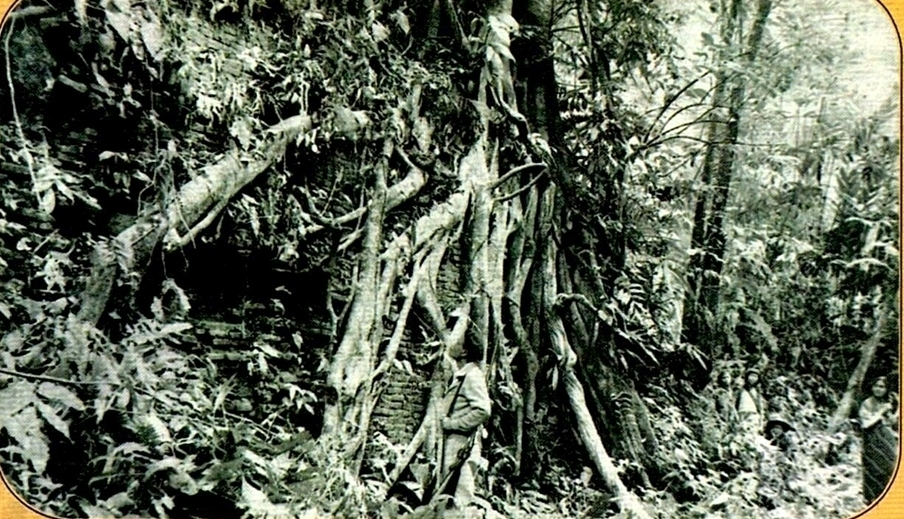
Archival photo of Western Gate of Bhismaknagar

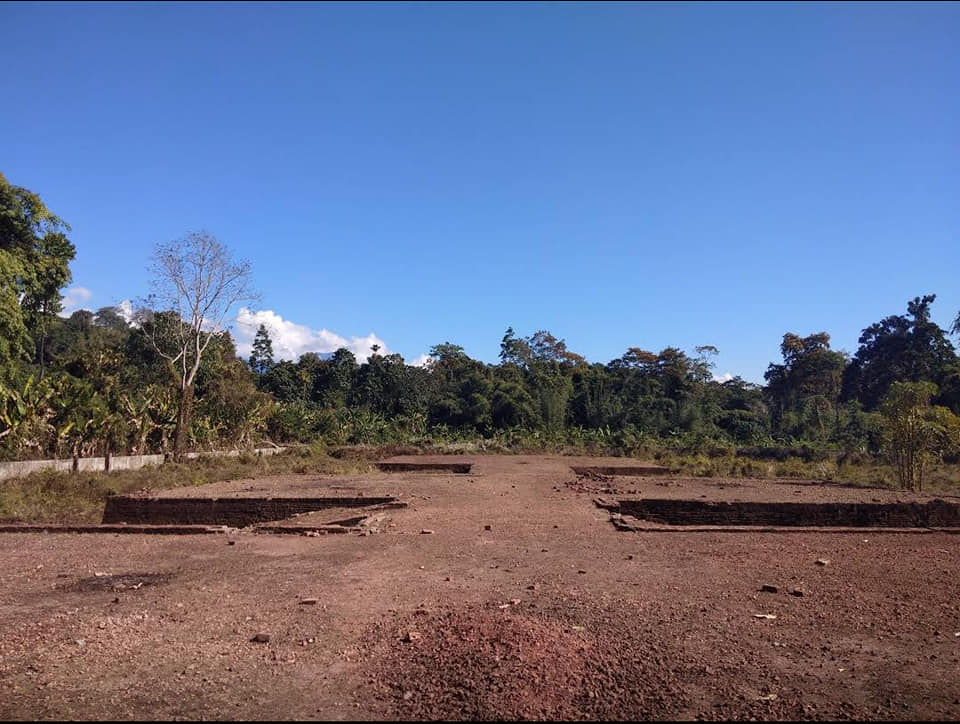
The three compartments of the central building.

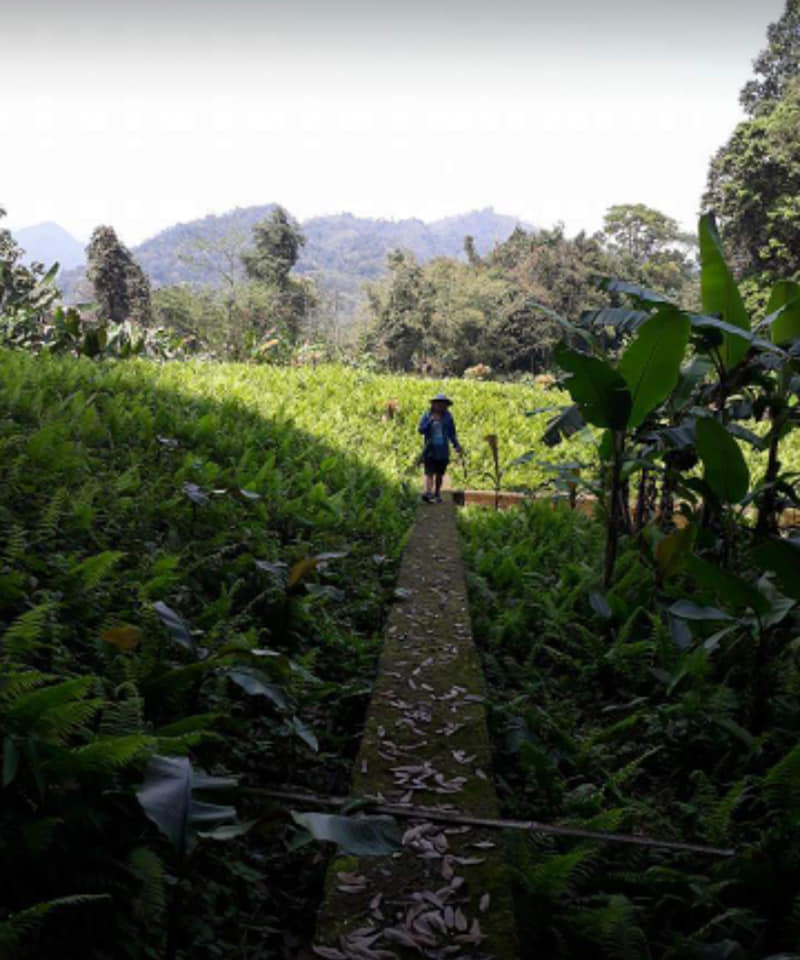
A separate structure inside the fortified walls.

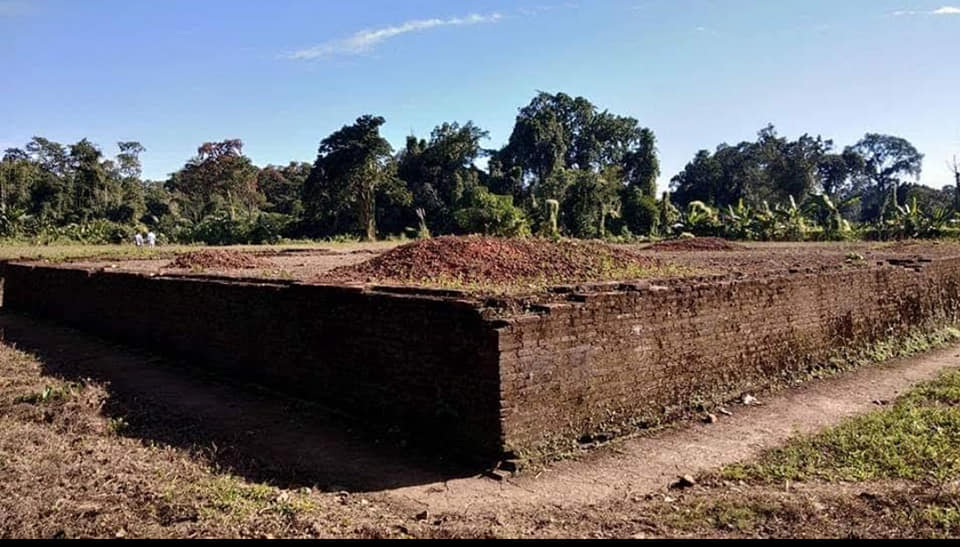
Central platform of Bhismaknagar.

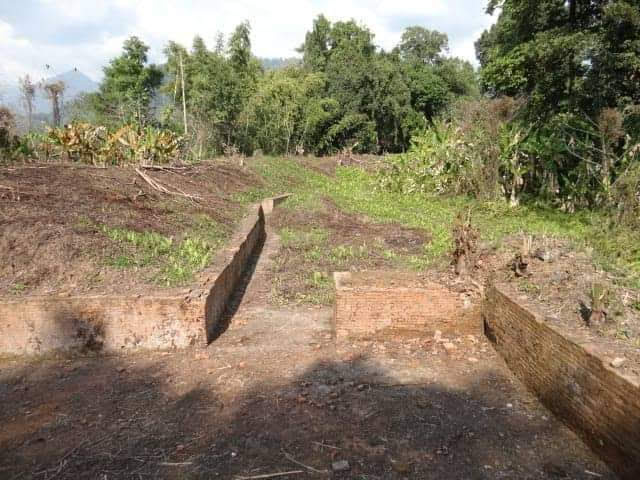
Western gateway with the upper damaged portions removed.

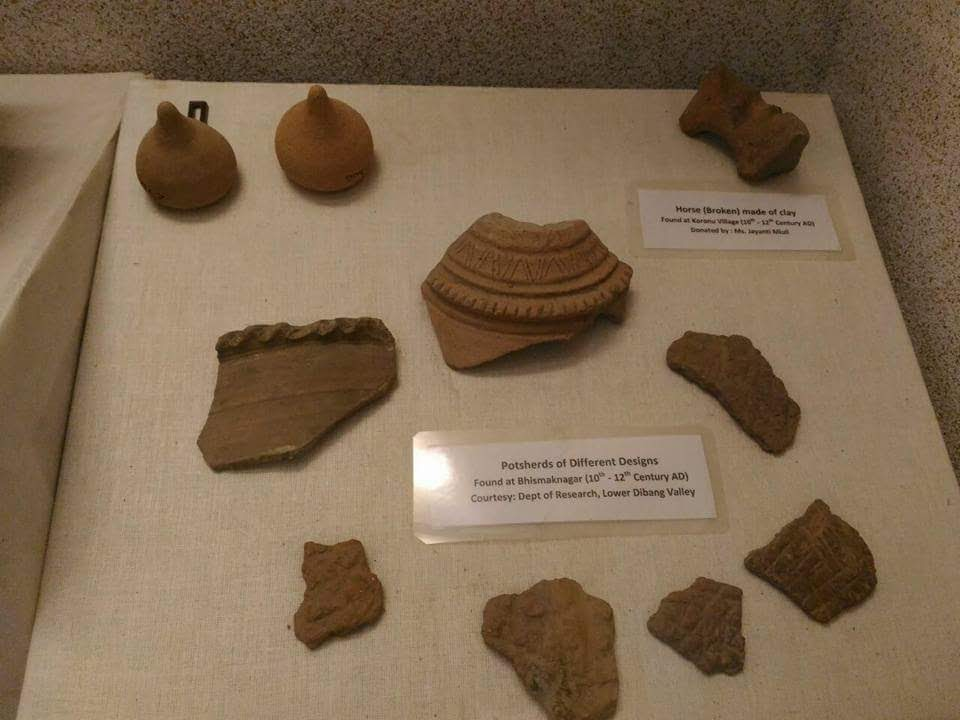
Potsherds found in Bhismaknagar.

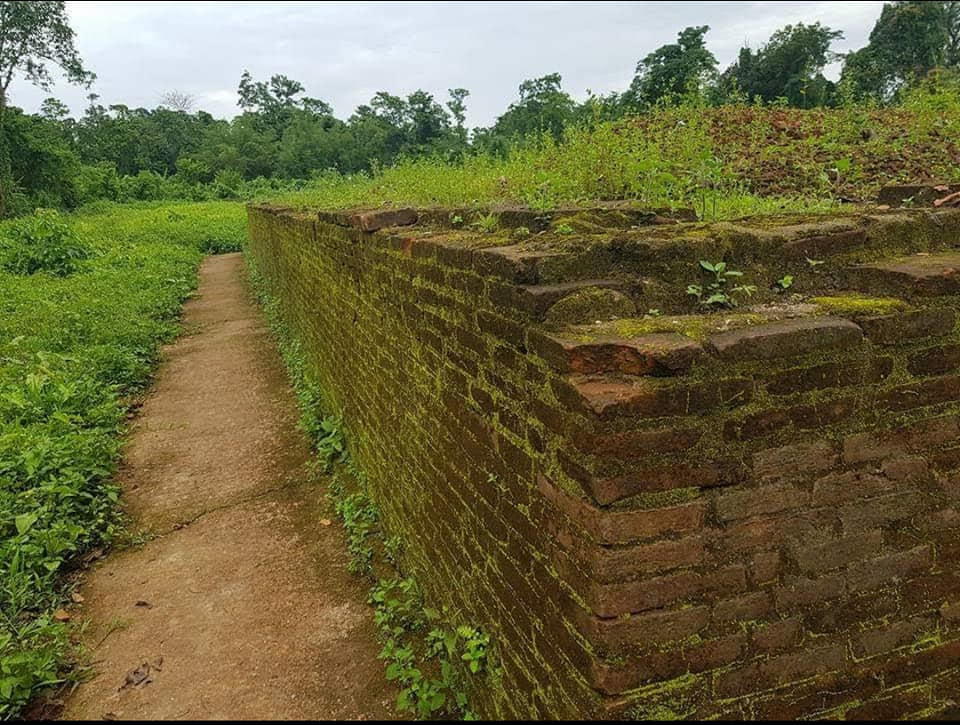
A section of the central building of Bhismaknagar.

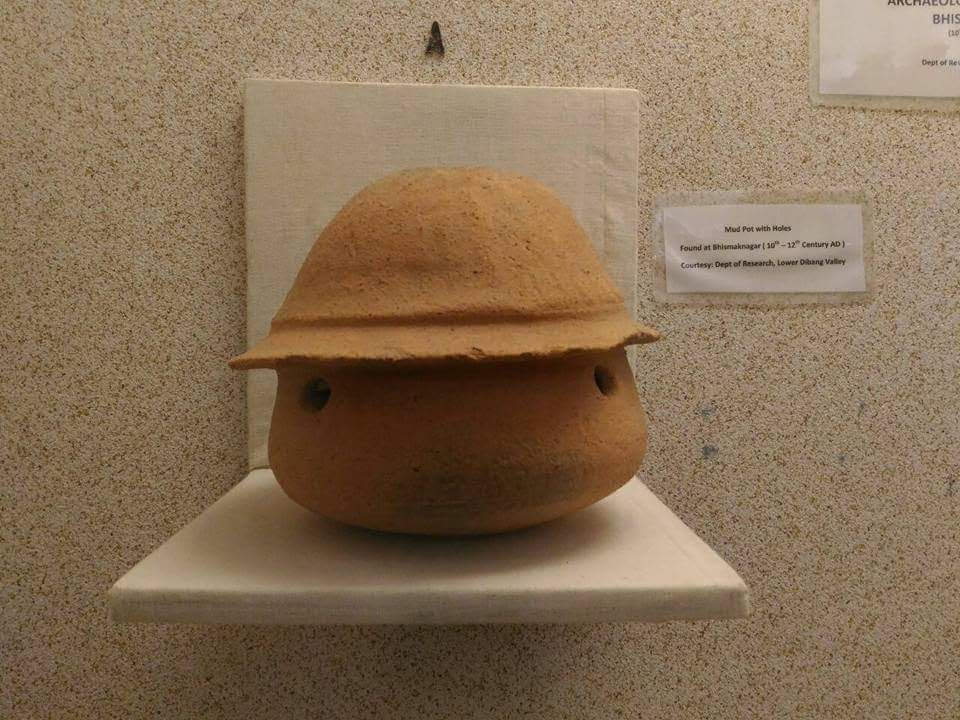
Mud pot with holes.

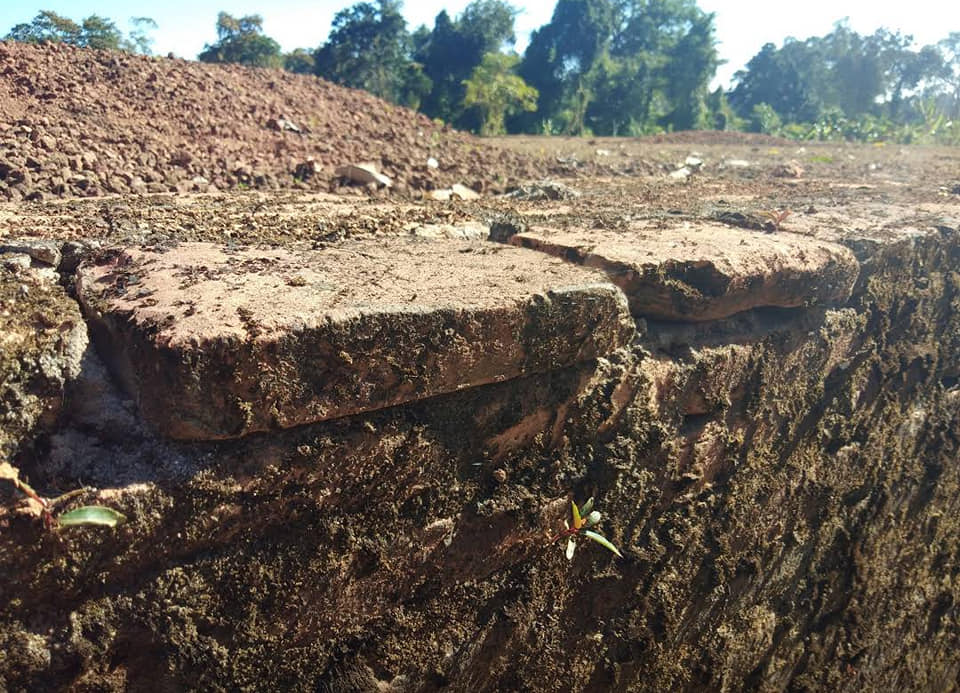
Brick of Bhismaknagar.

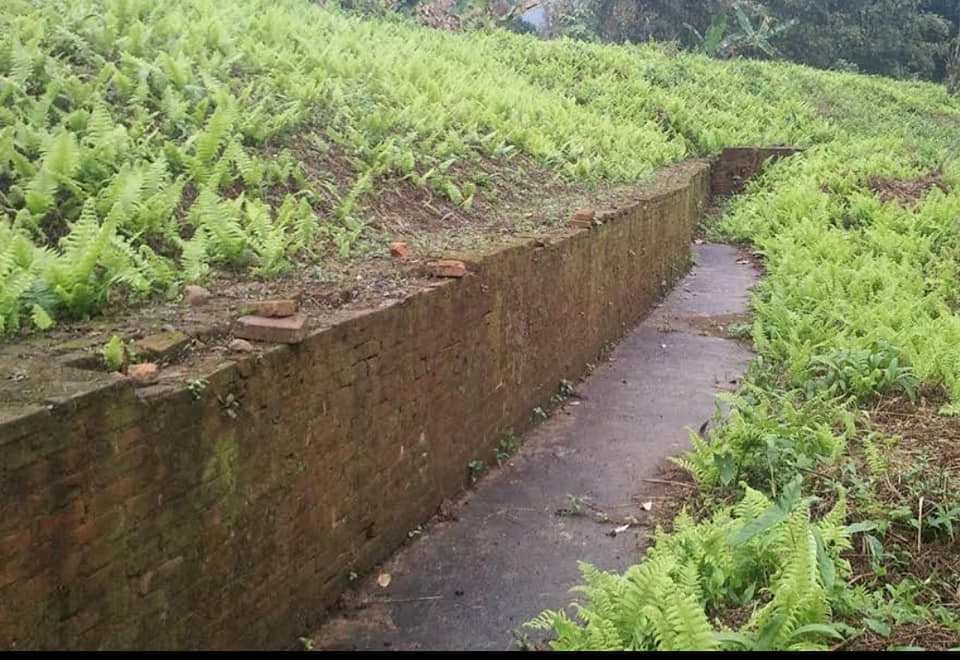
Section of the western brick wall.

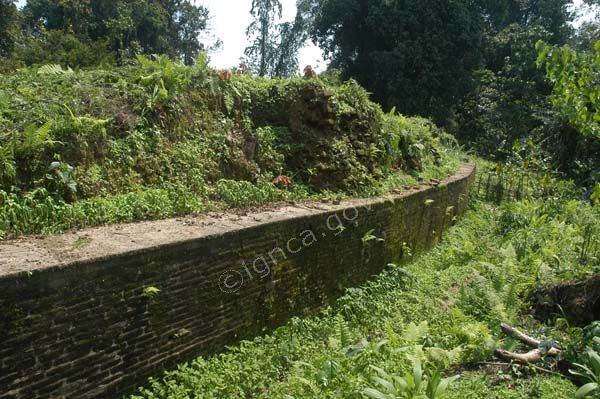
A section of western wall in Bhismaknagar

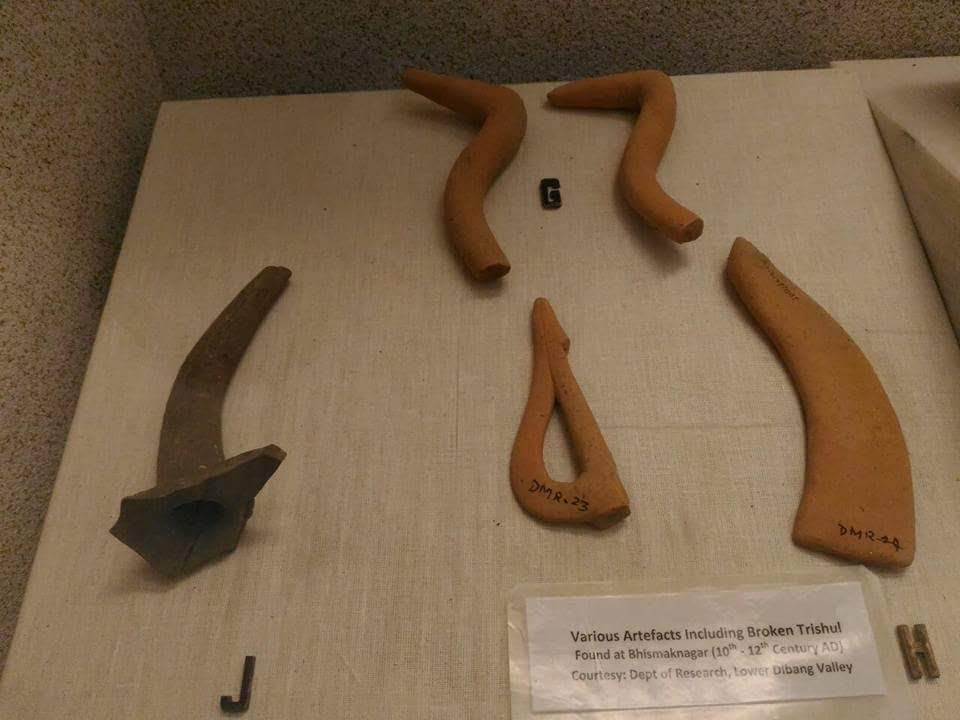
Various artifacts found in Bhismaknagar.

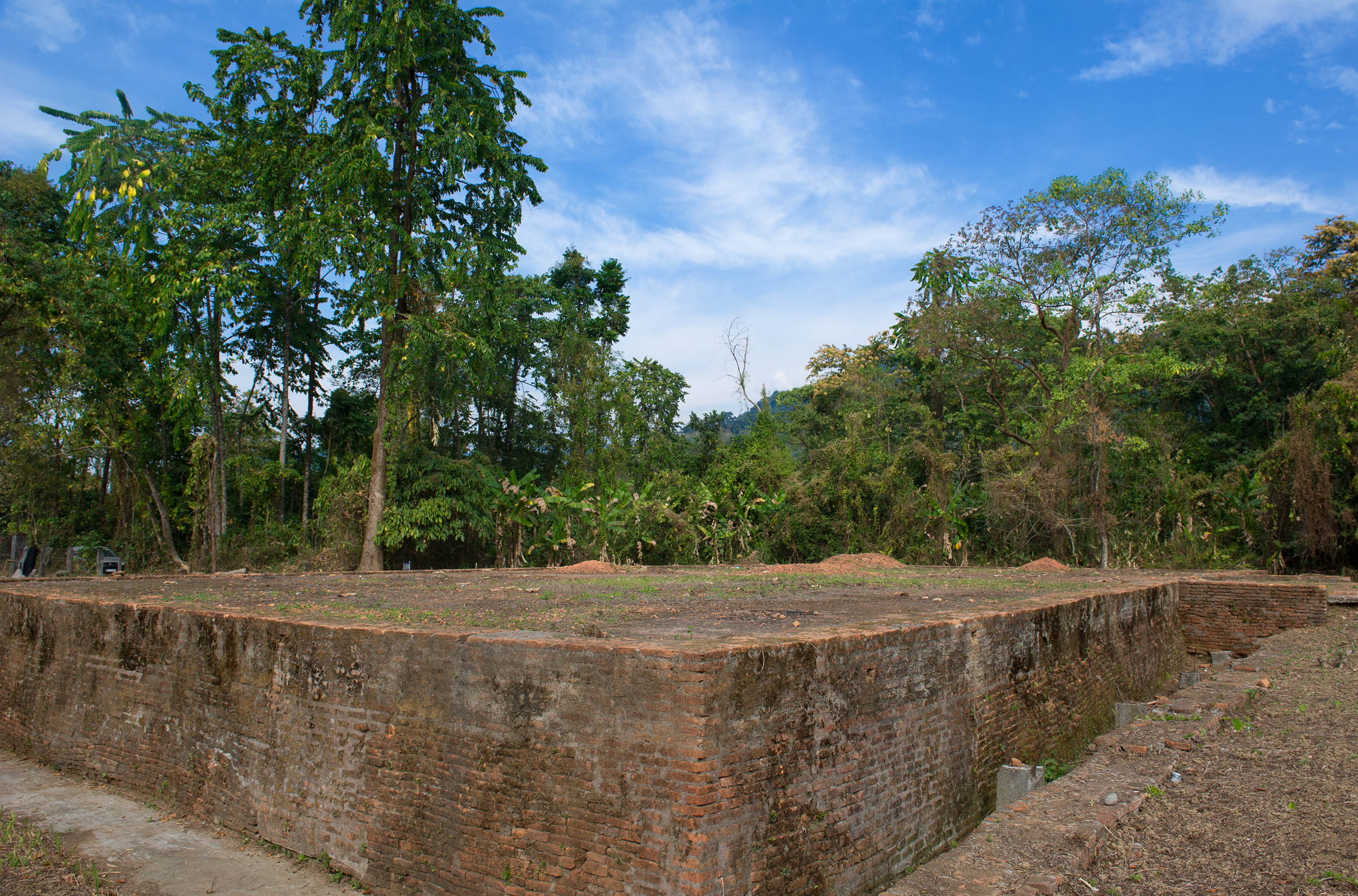
A brick platform of Bishmak Nagar temple in Arunachal Pradesh

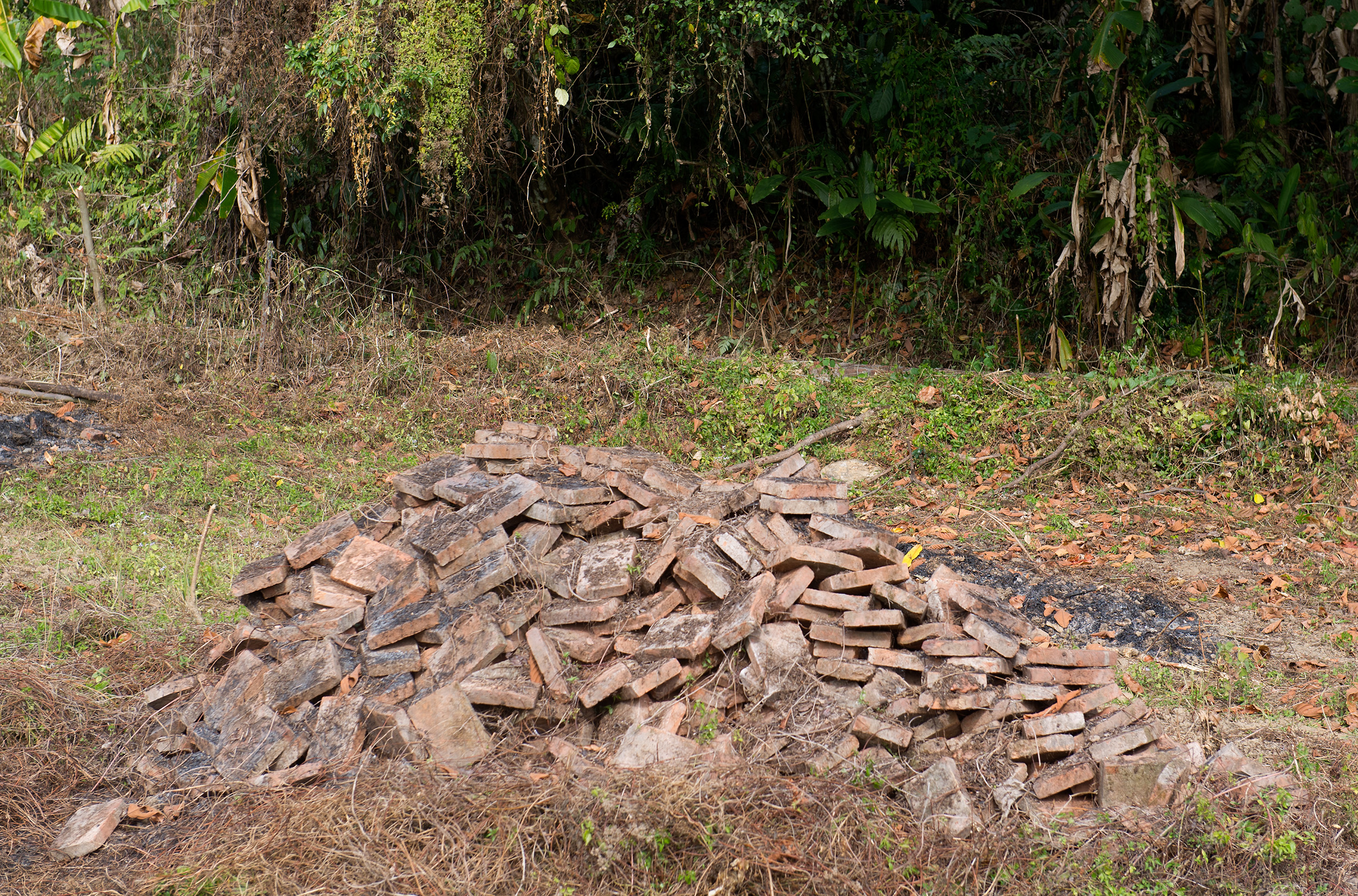
A stack of bricks of Bishmak Nagar ruins.
