= Talem Taboh =

Indian politician

Member of Arunachal Pradesh Legislative Assembly
- Incumbent
- Assumed office 2019
- Preceded by: Tamiyo Taga
- Constituency: Rumgong

Personal details
- Party: Bharatiya Janata Party

Talem Taboh is an Indian politician from Arunachal Pradesh belonging to the Bharatiya Janata Party. He is a member of the 11th Arunachal Pradesh Legislative Assembly from the Rumgong constituency. In the 2024 Arunachal Pradesh Legislative Assembly election, he won over NPP's candidate Taja Bonung, securing 5862 votes.
