= Ojing Tasing =

Member of the Arunachal Pradesh Legislative Assembly

Member of Arunachal Pradesh Legislative Assembly
- Incumbent
- Assumed office 1 June 2024
- Preceded by: Tapang Taloh
- Constituency: Pangin

Personal details
- Party: Bharatiya Janata Party

Ojing Tasing is an Indian politician from Arunachal Pradesh belonging to the Bharatiya Janata Party. He is a member of the 11th Arunachal Pradesh Legislative Assembly from the Pangin constituency.

== Education ==
He graduated from Jawaharlal Nehru College with a Bachelor of Arts idegree n 2001.
