= Deori people =

Tibeto-Burmese ethnic group of Northeast India

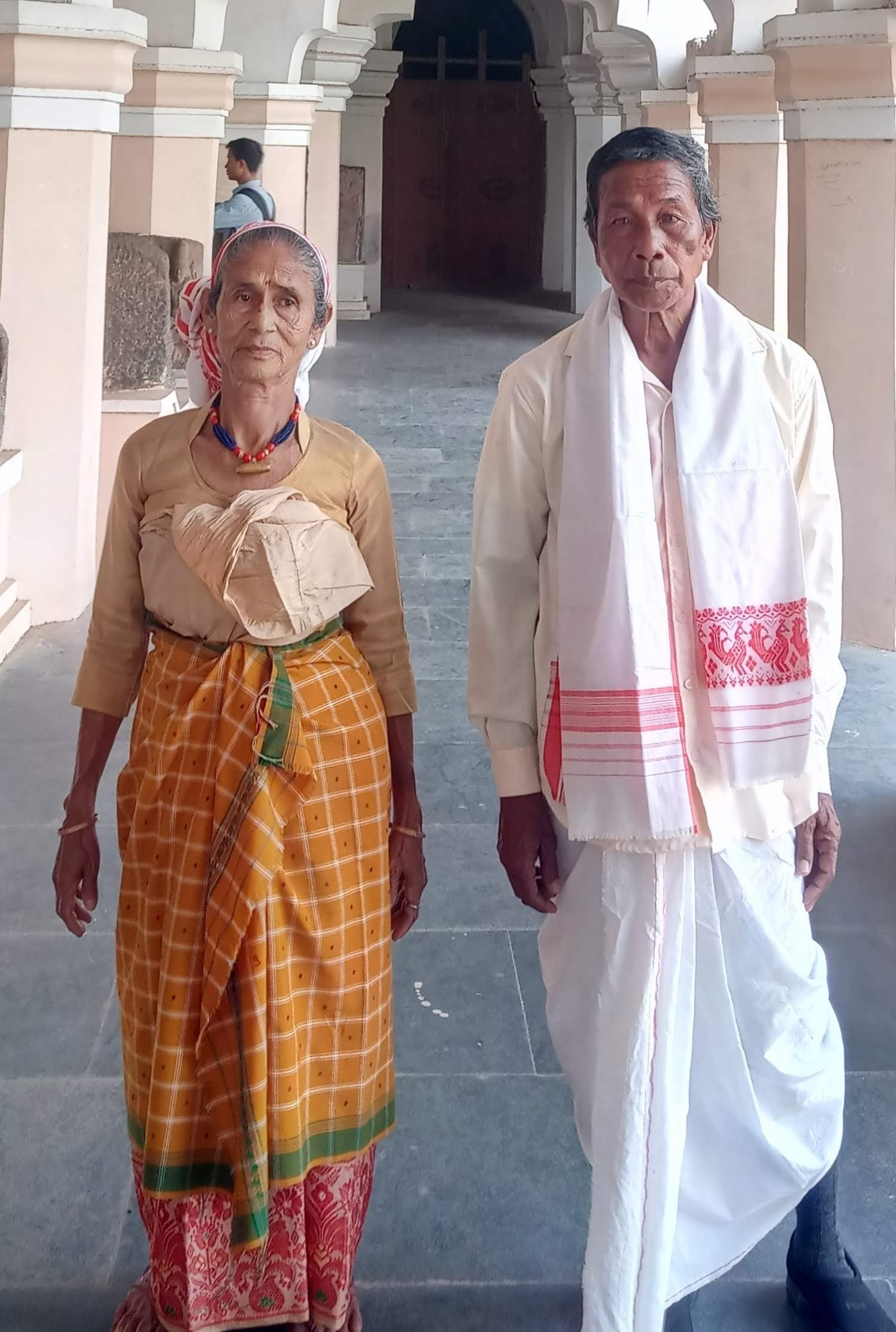

Regions with significant populations
- Assam, Arunachal Pradesh

Languages
- Assamese, Deori

Religion
- Folk religion

Related ethnic groups
- Chutias, Morans, Sonowal Kacharis

The Deori people are one of the major Sino-Tibetan ethnic groups of the Northeast Indian states of Assam and Arunachal Pradesh. They historically lived in the area of Sadiya, Joidaam, Patkai foothills and in the upper plains or also called as the hinterland of the Brahmaputra Valley. The Deori tribe is recognised as a scheduled tribe by the government of India.

Scanty information was found in few books and official records. The Deori language belongs to the Boro-Garo branch of the Tibeto-Burman language family. The community has maintained their racial traits, language, religion, folktales and traditional beliefs through the centuries. They were divided into Dibang-goñya (Dibongiya), Midoñya/Tengapaniya, Luitgoñya/Borgoñya, Patorgoñya. The native language is retained only by the Dibongiya group. They call themselves Jimochãya (literally: Children of the Sun).

== History ==
=== Origin folklore ===
Although the Deori tribe today form a separate community with Scheduled Tribe status and an autonomous council, the folklore of the Deori people connects their past with the Chutia kingdom. As per the origin folklore of the Deori tribe, once goddess Tamreswari took the form of a huge stone and floated in the water of Dibang River. The king, which they refer to as Bhismak, had sent many people in order to bring the stone to its assigned place but everyone failed. Four Chutia men came forward for the task. With a great sense of loyalty and devotion they started praying the goddess. The goddess became satisfied and the stone become automatically light. The four men brought the stone and placed it in the temple. The King became satisfied and appointed them as priests. They are the fore father of the four clans of the Deori people.

=== Homeland ===
The Deoris' homeland was in the eastern regions of undivided Assam. As per the folklore of the Deori people, they are settlers of the area of Joidaam and Patkai foothills and upper valley of Brahmaputra. Recorded Data and songs from the people dates back them as an early settlers in Sadiya where their oldest and most sacred temple is situated. During Burmese (Maan as called by Deoris) aggression (1817–1826), many Deoris perished. Many slaughtered and many taken as captive. Again the destructive earthquake of 1869 devastated the whole community. The uncertainty about future prevailed amongst those who floated down in the river using bamboo and banana plant made raft. They migrated to different places alongside the rivers they floated down. As they entered and landed in their new territory, they took the name of that particular river as their clan name. Deoris under the ruler of the new land had followed the law of the land. Those Deoris who migrated to places with less interest and influence of the outside rulers had followed their culture and traditions and continued their dialect.

Some experts, like Bishnu Prasad Rabha, claim that the Pator-goya clan assimilated with the Tiwa people in central Assam but there has been no scientific evidence to support the claim, which prompted a section of Deoris to begin a search. A preliminary investigation from 30 September to 5 October under the aegis of Jimachaya Giyan Aru Juktibadi Samaj has given a positive indication of the presence of Deori people in Kachin province and near Yangon in Myanmar. A team of researchers has decided to visit Myanmar in search of the lost clan. Most of the people of Dibongiya class can speak their own mother tongue along with Assamese, but the rest of the 3 other classes/clans ( except a few elderly persons) only understand and speak Assamese as their mother tongue. The three classes of Deoris live in the districts mentioned above.

== Language ==
The Deori language is one of the languages of the Tibeto-Burman languages family. Deori language is mainly spoken in Assam and Arunachal Pradesh. Over the years, Deori speakers, barring the Dibongia clan which uses it rigorously, have shifted to speaking the Assamese language, which can be attributed to the Language shift phenomenon.

== Religion ==
Traditionally Deori people follow Kundism (also Deori religion), is the Folk religion of the Deori tribe. Its a animistic, shamanic and ancestor worshipingpolytheistic religion .The religion is named after Kundi-Mama, the supreme deity of the Deori people. Kundi-Gira (the father) and Kundi-Girasi (the mother) together are known as Kundi-Mama or Gira-Girasi (the Old Ones) and are central to Deori spiritual beliefs.

Other major deities worshipped include Pisa-Dema (the eldest son), also known as Baliya-Baba or Baliya-Hemta, and Pisasi (the daughter), also called Tamreswari or Kechakati (Nang Hoo Toungh by khamtis). Their religious practices focus on natural forces, sacred groves, and clan-based rituals, with no ties to Hindu scriptures, idol worship. However, despite its distinct identity, the Indian government classifies the Deori people under Hinduism due to administrative policies, though their belief system remains independent and separate from mainstream Hinduism.

=== Miduku/kundiku (abode of deity) ===
Miduku or kundiku (also, Than/dauhal) are the site of worshiping for the people.

== Tradition ==
=== Clans ===
The Deori ethnic group are mainly divided into four clans, namely Dibongia, Borgoya, Tengaponiya and Pator-goya. The entire people of each main clan or main group are again subdivided into several sub-clans or sub-groups. The word "sub-clan" or "sub-group" is called "Boja" or "Bahor" in Deori language. Some of the commonly known sub-clans are like Ariya, Kumota, Bihiya, Naroda, Sundhariya, Patriya, Dupiya, Marangya, Chariya, Lagasu, Chitiga, Meheda, Kuliya, Khutiya/Buruk, Machiya, Bikomiya, Phaporiya, Fagimegia, Senaboriya, Chakucharu, Ekacharul/Busaru, Simocharu, Hizaru, Popharu, Gucharu etc. Each Deori people wants to know or wants to inform about their main clan and sub-clan (sub-group) in their first introduction. Otherwise, their introduction remains incomplete.

=== Priesthood ===
Deoris are known to serve as priests in three temples: the Tamreswari Temple, the Bura-Buri Than, the Boliya-hemata Temple and also in Malinithan.

The temple of Kecaikhaiti called Tamreswari Temple near Paya and Malinithan in Likabali of Arunachal Pradesh was worshipped by the Borgoya khel of the Deoris.

The Bura-Bura Than was worshipped by the Dibongia khel, while Boliya-hemanta Temple or Pisadema was worshipped by the Tengapania khel of the Deoris located on the Tengapani River.

== Notable people ==
- Bhimbor Deori, freedom fighter

== Sources ==
- Shin, Jae-Eun (2023), Kecaikhaiti, Eater of Raw Flesh: A Profile of the Multifaceted Goddess in the North-East, Manohar Publishers & Distributors
