= Tapang Taloh =

Indian politician

Member of the Arunachal Pradesh Legislative Assembly
- In office 2004–2019
- Preceded by: Bosiram Siram
- Succeeded by: Ojing Tasing
- Constituency: Pangin

Education Minister of Arunachal Pradesh

Personal details
- Born: Panging
- Party: INC
- Spouse: Omang Taloh
- Children: 3 sons, 2 daughters
- Occupation: Politician

Tapang Taloh is an Indian politician. He is a member of the Legislative Assembly of Arunachal Pradesh from the Pangin Assembly constituency. In the 2014 election, he defeated Ojing Tasing.

He joined Nationalist Congress Party (NCP) in March 2024.

== See also ==
- Arunachal Pradesh Legislative Assembly
