= Pangin =

- City
- Location in Arunachal Pradesh, India
- Coordinates: 28.14°N 95.276°E
- Country: India
- State: Arunachal Pradesh
- District: Siang
- Time zone: UTC+5:30 (IST)
- Vehicle registration: AR-09

Pangin is a town in Siang district, for which it is the headquarters. Prior to the creation of the Siang district in 2015, the town had been in East Siang district.

It is located at a distance of about 60 km (37 mi) from Pasighat, the earlier district headquarters by road. The settlement is at the junction point where Siyom River meets the Siang River. It is the home of the Adi people of Arunachal Pradesh.

As of 2016 the name of current MLA of Pangin constituency is Tapang Taloh.
