= Rumgong =

Village in Arunachal Pradesh, India

Coordinates: 28.311°N 94.887°E

Rumgong is a village in the Indian state of Arunachal Pradesh. Siang is the name of the district that contains village Rumgong.

Rumgong is a Tehsil and is located 24 km towards west from District headquarters Boleng, 209 km from state capital Itanagar towards South. Rumgong (Vidhan Sabha constituency) is one of the 60 constituencies of Legislative Assembly of Arunachal Pradesh. Name of current MLA of this constituency is Talem Taboh.

== See also ==
- Rumgong (Vidhan Sabha constituency)
- Kaying
