= Siang district =

Coordinates: 28.2056°N 94.9917°E

- District of Arunachal Pradesh
- Siang district Location in Arunachal Pradesh
- Country: India
- State: Arunachal Pradesh
- Headquarters: Boleng

Area
  - Total: 2,919 km^{2} (1,127 sq mi)

Population (2011)
  - Total: 31,920
  - Density: 10.94/km^{2} (28.32/sq mi)
- Time zone: UTC+05:30 (IST)

Siang district is the 21st district of Arunachal Pradesh State, India. This district was created in 2015 by carving it out of the West Siang and East Siang districts of Arunachal Pradesh. The regions included in the district were the legislative assembly constituencies, 32-Rumgong and 35-Pangin.

The district is predominantly inhabited by the Adi people of Arunachal Pradesh.

== Name ==
The Siang district is named after the River Siang (Yarlung Tsangpo, often identified with Brahmaputra) which flows through this district. Four other districts in Arunachal Pradesh are also named after the river: West Siang, East Siang, Upper Siang and Lower Siang.

The word siang is surmised to have originated from the Angsi glacier on the northern side of the Himalayas in Burang County of Tibet, where the Yarlung Tsangpo originates.

== Location ==
Geographically, Siang District is located almost in the centre of the Siang belt of Arunachal Pradesh.

Boleng is about 100 km from Pasighat, 45 km from Along and 22 km from Pangin.

== History ==
The creation of Siang district was approved by the Arunachal Pradesh government of Nabam Tuki on 21 March 2013. Eighteen months later the Pangin town was announced as the temporary headquarters of the district, amid claims that Boleng town had been promised the role.

Siang district was declared to be the 21st district of Arunachal Pradesh by Nabam Tuki on 27 November 2015. The new district was said to have been created to make the administration closer to the public. Funding was promised at that time for the construction of a district secretariat at Peram in Pangin, other offices in Pangin, also a small stadium, for school, hospital, housing, bridge, and road construction and other developments.

== Demographics ==
At the time of the 2011 census, the population was 31,920. Scheduled Tribes make up 28,922 (90.61%) of the population.

Religions in Siang district (2011)
Religion	Percent
Donyi-Polo	72.50%
Christianity	17.95%
Hinduism	8.24%
Other or not stated	1.31%

At the time of the 2011 census, 90.65% of the population spoke Adi, 2.69% Nepali and 2.05% Hindi as their first language.

== Administration ==
The main administrative centres which falls under the district are Additional Deputy Commissioner (ADCs) Rumgong, Kaying. Presently, it has 9 Zilla Parishad members i.e.: Jomlo Mobuk, Rumgong, Kaying, Payum, Boleng, Riga, Rebo-Perging, Pangin, and Kebang.

=== Divisions ===
The district has 4 Sub-Divisions:

- Boleng Division: Circles of Boleng, Riga, Rebo-Perging
- Pangin Sub-Division: Circles of Pangin, Kebang
- Rumgong Sub-Division: Circles of Jomlo Mobuk, Rumgong
- Kaying Sub-Division: Circles of Kaying, Payum

=== Assembly constituencies ===
There are 2 Arunachal Pradesh Legislative Assembly constituencies located in this district:

- Rumgong (32) - Arunachal West Lok Sabha Constituency
- Pangin (35) - Arunachal East Lok Sabha Constituency
