= Tengaponiya =

One of the major clans of the Deori tribe of India

Tengaponiya is one of the four main clans of the Deori tribe of India. The other three major clans are Dibongia, Bo-geenya and Pator-goya. In ancient time, the Tengaponiya clan lived on the bank of river Tengapani, hence their name.
