= Tamiyo Taga =

Indian politician

Minister in The Government of Arunachal Pradesh
- Incumbent
- Assumed office 2016

Tamiyo Taga is a leader of Bharatiya Janata Party from Arunachal Pradesh, India. He is a member of Arunachal Pradesh Legislative Assembly elected from Rumgong in West Siang district.

He was leader of opposition in Arunachal Legislative Assembly.

On 14-Oct-2016, Pema Khandu, Chief Minister of Arunachal Pradesh, formally joined hands with Bharatiya Janata Party, making Arunachal Pradesh 14th state to have BJP in power, and with this new coalition, Tamiyo Taga was sworn in as Cabinet minister of Arunachal Pradesh.

== See also ==
- Arunachal Pradesh Legislative Assembly
