= Dibongia =

One of the major clans of the Deori tribe of India

Dibongia is one of the major clans of the Deori tribe of India. The Deori tribe members are primarily found in Assam and Arunachal Pradesh. The other three major Deori clans are Tengaponiya, Bo-geenya and Pator-goya. A section of the Deori tribe who lived on the bank of the river Dibang, are now known as Dibongia. Deoris are a plains tribe in Assam. Deoris have four clans, Dibongia, Borgoyan, Tengaponia and Patorgoyan.
