= Tamreswari Temple =

Non-Hindu temple in India

Religion
- Affiliation: Ethnic religion
- District: Tinsukia district
- Deity: Kechai-Khati/Pishasi (tribal goddess) (equivalent to Nang Hoo Toungh)

Location
- Location: Sadiya
- State: Assam
- Country: India
- Interactive map of Tamreswari Temple

Architecture
- Creator: Chutia people

Tamreswari temple (also Dikkaravasini) is a temple for the tribal goddess called Kecaikhati, situated about 18 km away from Sadiya in Tinsukia district, Assam, India. The temple was in the custody of non-Brahmin tribal priests called Deoris (formerly a priestly class of Chutias). Some remains suggest that a Chutia king built a brick-cum-stone boundary wall in the year 1442. There were four different kinds of Deori priest who looked after the temple. The Bar Bharali and the Saru Bharali collected dues of the temple and provides animals for sacrifice. The Bar Deori (Deori Dema) and the Saru Deori (Deori Surba) performs the sacrifice and sung hymns. The temple was dedicated to Kechaikhati/Pishasi (kechai means raw and khati means eat), a powerful tribal deity or the Buddhist deity Tara, commonly found among different Bodo-Kachari groups. The worship of the goddess even after coming under Hindu influence was performed according to her old tribal customs. The temple was located on the right (western) bank of the river Paya and ruins of a Shiva temple still exist, opposite to it, on the left (eastern) bank.

The temple was abandoned during the reign of Suhitpangphaa (1780 - 1795), when the Ahom kingdom was attacked by the Konbaung dynasty of Burma. Scholars assert that Kesaikhaiti is equivalent to the Tai-Khamti female deity Nang Hoo Toungh.

Of note, the main Kecaikhati shrine at Tamreswari Temple once stood near Paya Reserve forest area in Arunachal Pradesh, next to Chunpura along Sadiya - Tezu route; is in ruins. The location of temple mentioned in this page under wikimedia (27° 32′ 50.86″ N, 94° 44′ 13.5″ E) in Bormuria Deori refers to another Tamreswari temple, which is very far from Sadiya. The Deori community, descendants of the temple’s priests, preserve its rituals in many relocated shrines, such as those in Lakhimpur and Dibrugarh.

== Stone inscription ==
The stone inscription found in the temple reads:

“Shiv-Charan-Prasadat Vridharajatan
Ya-Sri-Srimata-Mukta Dharmanarayana
Shri shrimati Digaravasini Ichtaka
Di-Virchit-Prakara-Nivaddha
Krit Agrahainike Saka 1364”

— Tamresari Wall inscription

The inscription describes that the walls of the temple have been built using bricks (Ichtaka) and other materials(Adi) by the son Mukta Dharmanarayan of the old Chutia king (name not specified) in the Saka year 1364 (1442 AD).

== The name Tamresari ==
The architectural design of the temple, particularly the wall and door elements, exhibited remarkable aesthetic quality, featuring intricate and exquisite craftsmanship. Two large elephant sculptures, each with silver tusks, were positioned at the main door. The construction of the walls was undertaken without the use of mortar. The temple roof was constructed from copper, which is the reason for its designation as Tamreswari.The temple was surrounded by brick walls, and on the western wall there was a space used for human sacrifice.

== Architecture ==
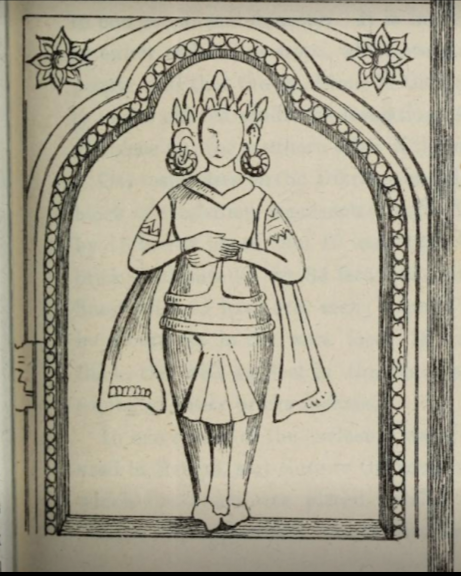
Sketch of a statue in Tamreswari Temple

The roof of the Tamresari temple was originally sheeted with copper as mentioned in the Changrung Phukan Buranji (1711 AD), from which the name is derived. In 1848, when Dalton visited the site, he found a stone structure, but the copper roof was already removed. As per T.Block who visited the site in 1905, this square structure in the corner cannot have been the main building inside the complex and the brick wall evidently enclosed some sort of a grand temple in the center which has disappeared with time. According to S.F. Hannay, the present temple complex was as near as possible square with the doorway to the west. There was a substantial brick wall, about 4.5 feet thick rising to the height of 8 feet, on the foundation of rudely cut blocks of sandstone. The entrance of the complex was on the west face, where there had been a stone enclosure and door. The ruins of the gateway which remains include the lintel carved on the edge in a chain of lotus flowers, some ornamented small pillars and an elephant statue. The three blocks forming the doorway, each of 7.5 feet long and 2 feet by 18 inches in girth, along with the blocks of the projecting wall, were reddish porphyritic granite of an adamantine hardness. There was another stone gateway at the southeast corner leading to the stream, in the bed of which are several carved and plain blocks of granite and sandstone.

According to Debala Mitra(1956), the temple was originally Chaturayatana, i.e. having four shrines, built of sandstone and granite and located in the south-east section of the rectangular brick enclosure, prakara roughly measuring 208 ft by 130 ft. The compound wall was 4 feet wide and 8 feet tall and had a stone gateway on the eastern side. In the floods of 1959, due to deposit of silt in the banks of Paya river the structure was completely submerged in the waters.
