= 2023 elections in India =

2023 Indian elections
- ← 2021 2022 2023 2024 2025 →

Rajya Sabha elections
- Overall control: None
- Seats contested: 10 (+2 by-elections)
- Net seat change: NDA +1

State elections
- States contested: 9
- Net state change: Steady

State by-elections
- Seats contested: 17
- Net seat change: NDA +1

Elections in India in 2023 were held in the Rajya Sabha, state legislative assemblies of nine states and several local bodies.

== Lok Sabha by-elections ==
| S.No | Date | Constituency | State/UT | MP before election | Party before election | Elected MP | Party after election | Reason |
|---|---|---|---|---|---|---|---|---|
| 1 | 10 May 2023 | Jalandhar | Punjab | Santokh Singh Chaudhary | Indian National Congress | Sushil Kumar Rinku | Aam Aadmi Party | Death of Santokh Singh Chaudhary |

== State legislative assembly elections ==
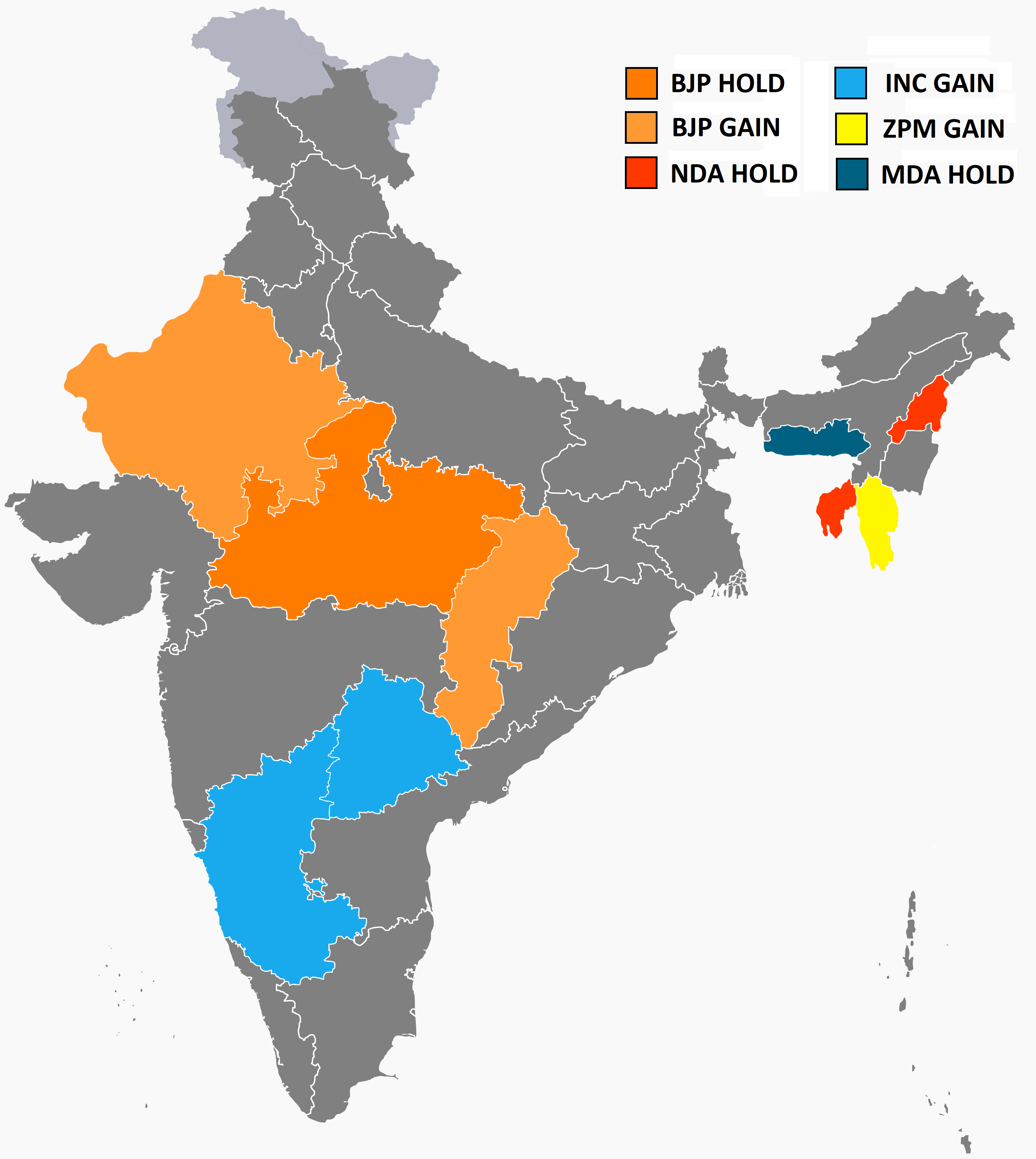
2023 Indian Election Results

| Polling Date(s) | State | Government before | Chief Minister before | Government after | Elected Chief Minister | Maps |
|---|---|---|---|---|---|---|
| 16 February 2023 | Tripura | Bharatiya Janata Party | Manik Saha | Bharatiya Janata Party | Manik Saha | |
| 27 February 2023 | Meghalaya | Meghalaya Democratic Alliance | Conrad Sangma | Meghalaya Democratic Alliance | Conrad Sangma | |
| 27 February 2023 | Nagaland | Nationalist Democratic Progressive Party | Neiphiu Rio | Nationalist Democratic Progressive Party | Neiphiu Rio | |
| 27 February 2023 | Nagaland | Bharatiya Janata Party | Neiphiu Rio | Bharatiya Janata Party | Neiphiu Rio | |
| 10 May 2023 | Karnataka | Bharatiya Janata Party | Basavaraj S. Bommai | Indian National Congress | Siddaramaiah | |
| 7 November 2023 | Mizoram | Mizo National Front | Zoramthanga | Zoram People's Movement | Lalduhoma | |
| 7 and 17 November 2023 | Chhattisgarh | Indian National Congress | Bhupesh Baghel | Bharatiya Janata Party | Vishnu Deo Sai | |
| 17 November 2023 | Madhya Pradesh | Bharatiya Janata Party | Shivraj Singh Chouhan | Bharatiya Janata Party | Mohan Yadav | |
| 25 November 2023 | Rajasthan | Indian National Congress | Ashok Gehlot | Bharatiya Janata Party | Bhajan Lal Sharma | |
| 30 November 2023 | Telangana | Bharat Rashtra Samithi | K. Chandrasekhar Rao | Indian National Congress | Anumula Revanth Reddy | |

== Legislative Assembly by-elections ==
=== Arunachal Pradesh ===
| Date | S.No | Constituency | MLA before election | Party before election | Elected MLA | Party after election | Reason |
|---|---|---|---|---|---|---|---|
| 27 February 2023 | 1 | Lumla | Jambey Tashi | Bharatiya Janata Party | Tsering Lhamu | Bharatiya Janata Party | Death of Jambey Tashi |

=== Jharkhand ===
| Date | S.No | Constituency | MLA before election | Party before election | Elected MLA | Party after election | Reason |
|---|---|---|---|---|---|---|---|
| 27 February 2023 | 23 | Ramgarh | Mamta Devi | Indian National Congress | Sunita Choudhary | All Jharkhand Students Union | Conviction of Mamta Devi |
| 5 September 2023 | 33 | Dumri | Jagannath Mahto | Jharkhand Mukti Morcha | Baby Devi | Jharkhand Mukti Morcha | Death of Jagannath Mahto |

=== Kerala ===
| Date | S.No | Constituency | MLA before election | Party before election | Elected MLA | Party after election | Reason |
|---|---|---|---|---|---|---|---|
| 5 September 2023 | 98 | Puthuppally | Oommen Chandy | Indian National Congress | Chandy Oommen | Indian National Congress | Death of Oommen Chandy |

=== Maharashtra ===
| Date | S.No | Constituency | MLA before election | Party before election | Elected MLA | Party after election | Reason |
|---|---|---|---|---|---|---|---|
| 26 February 2023 | 205 | Chinchwad | Laxman Jagtap | Bharatiya Janata Party | Ashwini Jagtap | Bharatiya Janata Party | Death of Laxman Jagtap |
| 26 February 2023 | 215 | Kasba Peth | Mukta Tilak | Bharatiya Janata Party | Ravindra Dhangekar | Indian National Congress | Death of Mukta Tilak |

=== Nagaland ===
| Date | S.No | Constituency | MLA before election | Party before election | Elected MLA | Party after election | Reason |
|---|---|---|---|---|---|---|---|
| 7 November 2023 | 48 | Tapi | Noke Wangnao | Nationalist Democratic Progressive Party | Wangpang Konyak | Nationalist Democratic Progressive Party | Death of Noke Wangnao |

=== Odisha ===
| Date | S.No | Constituency | MLA before election | Party before election | Elected MLA | Party after election | Reason |
|---|---|---|---|---|---|---|---|
| 10 May 2023 | 7 | Jharsuguda | Naba Kishore Das | Biju Janata Dal | Dipali Das | Biju Janata Dal | Death of Naba Kishore Das |

=== Tamil Nadu ===
| Date | S.No | Constituency | MLA before election | Party before election | Elected MLA | Party after election |
|---|---|---|---|---|---|---|
| 27 February 2023 | 98 | Erode (East) | Thirumagan Evera | Indian National Congress | E. V. K. S. Elangovan | Indian National Congress |

=== Tripura ===
| Date | S.No | Constituency | MLA before election | Party before election | Elected MLA | Party after election |
|---|---|---|---|---|---|---|
| 5 September 2023 | 20 | Boxanagar | Samsul Haque | Communist Party of India (Marxist) | Tafajjal Hossain | Bharatiya Janata Party |
| 5 September 2023 | 23 | Dhanpur | Pratima Bhoumik | Bharatiya Janata Party | Bindu Debnath | Bharatiya Janata Party |

=== Uttarakhand ===
| Date | S.No | Constituency | MLA before election | Party before election | Elected MLA | Party after election |
|---|---|---|---|---|---|---|
| 5 September 2023 | 47 | Bageshwar | Chandan Ram Das | Bharatiya Janata Party | Parwati Das | Bharatiya Janata Party |

=== Uttar Pradesh ===
| Date | S.No | Constituency | MLA before election | Party before election | Elected MLA | Party after election |
|---|---|---|---|---|---|---|
| 10 May 2023 | 34 | Suar | Abdullah Azam Khan | Samajwadi Party | Shafeek Ahmed Ansari | Apna Dal (Sonelal) |
| 10 May 2023 | 395 | Chhanbey | Rahul Prakash Kol | Apna Dal (Sonelal) | Rinki Kol | Apna Dal (Sonelal) |
| 5 September 2023 | 354 | Ghosi | Dara Singh Chauhan | Samajwadi Party | Sudhakar Singh | Samajwadi Party |

=== West Bengal ===
| Date | Constituency | | Previous MLA | | Reason | Elected MLA | |
|---|---|---|---|---|---|---|---|
| 27 February 2023 | 60 | Sagardighi | Subrata Saha | Trinamool Congress | Died on 29 December 2022 | Bayron Biswas | Indian National Congress |
| 5 September 2023 | 15 | Dhupguri | Bishnu Pada Roy | Bharatiya Janata Party | Died on 25 July 2023 | Nirmal Chandra Roy | Trinamool Congress |

== Local body elections ==
=== Himachal Pradesh ===
| Date | Municipal corporation | Government before | Government after |
|---|---|---|---|
| 2 May 2023 | Shimla Municipal Corporation | Bharatiya Janata Party | Indian National Congress |

=== Ladakh ===
| Date | Autonomous Council | Government before | Government after |
|---|---|---|---|
| 4 October 2023 | Ladakh Autonomous Hill Development Council, Kargil | Jammu & Kashmir National Conference | Jammu & Kashmir National Conference |

=== Mizoram ===
| Date | Autonomous Council | Government before | Government after |
|---|---|---|---|
| 9 May 2023 | Chakma Autonomous District Council | Mizo National Front | Mizo National Front |

=== Uttar Pradesh ===
| Date | Municipal Corporation | Government before | Government after |
|---|---|---|---|
| 4 May 2023 | Lucknow Municipal Corporation | Bharatiya Janata Party | Bharatiya Janata Party |
| 4 May 2023 | Varanasi Municipal Corporation | Bharatiya Janata Party | Bharatiya Janata Party |
| 4 May 2023 | Prayagraj Municipal Corporation | Bharatiya Janata Party | Bharatiya Janata Party |
| 4 May 2023 | Agra Municipal Corporation | Bharatiya Janata Party | Bharatiya Janata Party |
| 4 May 2023 | Jhansi Municipal Corporation | Bharatiya Janata Party | Bharatiya Janata Party |
| 4 May 2023 | Saharanpur Municipal Corporation | Bharatiya Janata Party | Bharatiya Janata Party |
| 4 May 2023 | Moradabad Municipal Corporation | Bharatiya Janata Party | Bharatiya Janata Party |
| 4 May 2023 | Mathura–Vrindavan Municipal Corporation | Bharatiya Janata Party | Bharatiya Janata Party |
| 4 May 2023 | Firozabad Municipal Corporation | Bharatiya Janata Party | Bharatiya Janata Party |
| 4 May 2023 | Gorakhpur Municipal Corporation | Bharatiya Janata Party | Bharatiya Janata Party |
| 11 May 2023 | Ayodhya Municipal Corporation | Bharatiya Janata Party | Bharatiya Janata Party |
| 11 May 2023 | Ghaziabad Municipal Corporation | Bharatiya Janata Party | Bharatiya Janata Party |
| 11 May 2023 | Kanpur Municipal Corporation | Bharatiya Janata Party | Bharatiya Janata Party |
| 11 May 2023 | Bareilly Municipal Corporation | Bharatiya Janata Party | Bharatiya Janata Party |
| 11 May 2023 | Aligarh Municipal Corporation | Bahujan Samaj Party | Bharatiya Janata Party |
| 11 May 2023 | Meerut Municipal Corporation | Bahujan Samaj Party | Bharatiya Janata Party |
| 11 May 2023 | Shahjahanpur Municipal Corporation | did not exist | Bharatiya Janata Party |

== See also ==
- 2024 elections in India
- 2022 elections in India
- 2023 Rajya Sabha elections
