= 2028 elections in India =

2028 Indian elections
- ← 2026 2027 2028 2029 2030 →

State elections
- States contested: 9

The 2028 elections in India are expected to include the elections of the Rajya Sabha and 9 states legislative assemblies.

== State legislative assembly elections ==
Date(s)	State/UT	Incumbent		Elected		Maps
Date(s)	State/UT	Parties	CM	Parties	CM	Maps
February 2028*	Tripura	Bharatiya Janata Party	Manik Saha	TBD		
February 2028*	Meghalaya	National People's Party	Conrad Sangma	TBD		
February 2028*	Nagaland	Naga People's Front	Neiphiu Rio	TBD		
May 2028*	Karnataka	Indian National Congress	D. K. Shivakumar	TBD		
November 2028*	Telangana	Indian National Congress	Revanth Reddy	TBD		
November 2028*	Chhattisgarh	Bharatiya Janata Party	Vishnu Deo Sai	TBD		
November 2028*	Madhya Pradesh	Bharatiya Janata Party	Mohan Yadav	TBD		
November 2028*	Rajasthan	Bharatiya Janata Party	Bhajan Lal Sharma	TBD		
November 2028*	Mizoram	Zoram People's Movement	Lalduhoma	TBD		

* Tentative schedule as per assembly tenure

== Local body elections ==
=== Himachal Pradesh ===
Date	Municipal corporation	Government before	Government after
TBD	Shimla	INC	TBD

=== Mizoram ===
Date	Autonomous Council	Government before	Government after
TBD	Chakma	BJP	TBD

=== Uttar Pradesh ===
Date	Municipal Corporation	Government before	Government after
TBD	Lucknow	BJP	TBD
TBD	Varanasi	BJP	TBD
TBD	Prayagraj	BJP	TBD
TBD	Agra	BJP	TBD
TBD	Jhansi	BJP	TBD
TBD	Saharanpur	BJP	TBD
TBD	Moradabad	BJP	TBD
TBD	Mathura–Vrindavan	BJP	TBD
TBD	Firozabad	BJP	TBD
TBD	Gorakhpur	BJP	TBD
TBD	Ayodhya	BJP	TBD
TBD	Ghaziabad	BJP	TBD
TBD	Kanpur	BJP	TBD
TBD	Bareilly	BJP	TBD
TBD	Aligarh	BJP	TBD
TBD	Meerut	BJP	TBD
TBD	Shahjahanpur	BJP	TBD

== See also ==
- 2027 elections in India
