= 2023 Uttar Pradesh local elections =

- 4 and 11 May 2023
- 760 municipalities in Uttar Pradesh
Party	Leader	Vote %	Seats	+/–
BJP	Yogi Adityanath		297	
SP	Akhilesh Yadav		114	
BSP	Mayawati		53	
INC	Brijlal Khabri		18	
AAP	Sanjay Singh		9	
RLD	Jayant Chaudhary		14	
AIMIM	Shaukat Ali		5	
Others			14	
Independents			236	
This lists parties that won seats. See the complete results below.

Municipal elections were held in Uttar Pradesh in two phases on 4 and 11 May 2023 to elect members of 760 municipalities - 17 Nagar Nigams, 199 Nagar Palika Parishad and 544 Nagar Panchayats.

The BJP swept the election, winning all the mayoral seats and winning a majority in municipal councils and municipal committees.

== Political parties ==
18 recognized political parties are contesting the elections.

- Nationalist Congress Party
- Bahujan Samaj Party
- Communist Party of India
- Bharatiya Janata Party
- Indian National Congress
- Janata Dal (United)
- Communist Party of India (Marxist)
- Communist Party of India (ML)
- Samata Party
- Samajwadi Party
- Rashtriya Lok Dal
- Rashtriya Janata Dal
- Lok Janshakti Party
- Janata Dal (Secular)
- All India Forward Bloc
- All India Majlis-e-Ittehadul Muslimeen
- Aam Admi Party
- Indian Union Muslim League

== Total seats for contest ==
Type	Chairman/ Mayor	Ward Members
Nagar Nigam	17	1420
Nagar Palika Parishad	199	5327
Nagar Panchayat	544	7177

== Mayoral candidates ==
No.	Municipal Corporation	District	BJP candidate	SP candidate	BSP candidate	INC candidate
1	Agra Municipal Corporation	Agra	Hemalata Diwakar	Juhi Prakash Jatav	Lata Balmiki	Lata
2	Aligarh Municipal Corporation	Aligarh	Prashant Singhal	Jameer Ullah Khan	Salman Shahid	C P Gautam
3	Ayodhya Municipal Corporation	Ayodhya	Girishpati Tripathi	Ashish Pandey	Rammurti Yadav	Pramila Rajput
4	Bareilly Municipal Corporation	Bareilly	Umesh Gautam	(Note: Support to Independent candidate Iqbal Singh Tomar)	Yusuf Khan	K B Tripathi
5	Firozabad Municipal Corporation	Firozabad	Kamini Rathore	Mashroor Fatima	Rukhsana Begum	Nuzhat Ansari
6	Ghaziabad Municipal Corporation	Ghaziabad	Sunita Dayal	Poonam Yadav	Nisara Khan	Pushpa Rawat
7	Gorakhpur Municipal Corporation	Gorakhpur	Dr. Manglesh Srivastava	Kajal Nishad	Nawal Kishore Nathani	Naveen Sinha
8	Jhansi Municipal Corporation	Jhansi	Biharilal Verma	Satish Jataria	Bhagwan Das Phule	Arvind Kumar
9	Kanpur Municipal Corporation	Kanpur Nagar	Pramila Pandey	Vandana Bajpai	Archana Nishad	Ashani Awasthi
10	Lucknow Municipal Corporation	Lucknow	Sushma Kharkwal	Vandana Mishra	Shaheen Bano	Sangeeta Jaiswal
11	Meerut Municipal Corporation	Meerut	Harikant Ahluwalia	Seema Pradhan	Hasmat Ali	Naseem Kuraishi
12	Moradabad Municipal Corporation	Moradabad	Vinod Agrawal	Syed Raisuddin	Mohd. Yameen	Rizwan Kuraishi
13	Prayagraj Municipal Corporation	Prayagraj	Ganesh Kesarwani	Ajay Srivastava	Saeed Ahmed	Prabhashankar Mishra
14	Saharanpur Municipal Corporation	Saharanpur	Dr. Ajay Kumar	Noor Hassan Mallik	Khadeeja Masood	Pradeep Verma
15	Shahjahanpur Municipal Corporation	Shahjahanpur	Archana Verma	Mala Rathore	Shagufta Anjum	Nikhat Iqbal
16	Varanasi Municipal Corporation	Varanasi	Ashok Tiwari	Dr. O P Singh	Subhash Chandra Majhi	Anil Srivastava
17	Mathura Vrindavan Municipal Corporation	Mathura	Vinod Sharma	Pt. Tulsiram Sharma	Raja Mohtasim Ahmed	Ram Kumar Rawat

== Results ==
Type	Chairman/ Mayor	BJP	SP	BSP	INC	AAP	OTH	IND	Ward Members	BJP	SP	BSP	INC	IND
Nagar Nigam	17	17	0	0	0	0	0	0	1420	813	191	85	77	254
Nagar Palika Parishad	199	89	35	16	4	3	11	41	5327	1360	425	191	91	3260
Nagar Panchayat	544	191	79	37	14	6	22	195	7177	1403	485	215	77	4997

=== Municipal Corporations ===
There are 17 Municipal Corporations in Uttar Pradesh with 1420 wards. The results were announced on 13 May 2023.

==== Mayor results ====
No.	Municipal Corporation	Winning Candidate	Winning Party	Losing candidate	Losing Party
1	Agra Municipal Corporation	Hemalata Diwakar	Bharatiya Janata Party	Lata Balmiki	Bahujan Samaj Party
2	Aligarh Municipal Corporation	Prashant Singhal	Bharatiya Janata Party	Jameer Ullah Khan	Samajwadi Party
3	Ayodhya Municipal Corporation	Girishpati Tripathi	Bharatiya Janata Party	Ashish Pandey	Samajwadi Party
4	Bareilly Municipal Corporation	Umesh Gautam	Bharatiya Janata Party	Iqbal Singh Tomar	Independent politician
5	Firozabad Municipal Corporation	Kamini Rathore	Bharatiya Janata Party	Mashroor Fatima	Samajwadi Party
6	Ghaziabad Municipal Corporation	Sunita Dayal	Bharatiya Janata Party	Nisara Khan	Bahujan Samaj Party
7	Gorakhpur Municipal Corporation	Dr. Manglesh Srivastava	Bharatiya Janata Party	Kajal Nishad	Samajwadi Party
8	Jhansi Municipal Corporation	Bihari Lal Arya	Bharatiya Janata Party	Arvind Kumar	Indian National Congress
9	Kanpur Municipal Corporation	Pramila Pandey	Bharatiya Janata Party	Vandana Bajpai	Samajwadi Party
10	Lucknow Municipal Corporation	Sushma Kharkwal	Bharatiya Janata Party	Vandana Mishra	Samajwadi Party
11	Meerut Municipal Corporation	Harikant Ahluwalia	Bharatiya Janata Party	Anas	All India Majlis-e-Ittehadul Muslimeen
12	Moradabad Municipal Corporation	Vinod Agrawal	Bharatiya Janata Party	Rizwan Kuraishi	Indian National Congress
13	Prayagraj Municipal Corporation	Ganesh Kesarwani	Bharatiya Janata Party	Ajay Srivastava	Samajwadi Party
14	Saharanpur Municipal Corporation	Dr. Ajay Kumar Singh	Bharatiya Janata Party	Khadeeja Masood	Bahujan Samaj Party
15	Shahjahanpur Municipal Corporation	Archana Verma	Bharatiya Janata Party	Nikhat Iqbal	Indian National Congress
16	Varanasi Municipal Corporation	Ashok Tiwari	Bharatiya Janata Party	Anil Srivastava	Samajwadi Party
17	Mathura–Vrindavan Municipal Corporation	Vinod Agarwal	Bharatiya Janata Party	Raja Mohtasim Ahmed	Bahujan Samaj Party

==== Ward-wise results ====
Corporation Election Data Published by State Election Commission of Uttar Pradesh

No.	Municipal Corporation	Total Wards	BJP	SP	BSP	INC	Others
1	Agra Municipal Corporation	100	58	03	27	01	11
2	Aligarh Municipal Corporation	90	45	33	07	01	4
3	Ayodhya Municipal Corporation	60	27	17	03	00	13
4	Bareilly Municipal Corporation	80	51	13	00	03	13
5	Firozabad Municipal Corporation	70	32	15	07	01	15
6	Ghaziabad Municipal Corporation	100	66	05	05	03	21
7	Gorakhpur Municipal Corporation	80	42	15	05	01	17
8	Jhansi Municipal Corporation	60	38	00	07	04	11
9	Kanpur Municipal Corporation	110	73	17	00	05	15
10	Lucknow Municipal Corporation	110	80	21	01	04	4
11	Meerut Municipal Corporation	90	42	13	06	03	26
12	Moradabad Municipal Corporation	70	35	03	02	22	8
13	Prayagraj Municipal Corporation	100	56	16	02	04	22
14	Saharanpur Municipal Corporation	70	38	03	07	00	22
15	Shahjahanpur Municipal Corporation	60	41	00	01	03	15
16	Varanasi Municipal Corporation	100	62	13	00	08	17
17	Mathura–Vrindavan Municipal Corporation	70	36	02	05	06	21
	Total	1420	813	191	85	77	254

== See also ==
- 2023 elections in India
- List of urban local bodies in Uttar Pradesh
