= Sigra =

Locality in Varanasi, Uttar Pradesh

- Locality
- Location in Uttar Pradesh, India Sigra (Uttar Pradesh)
- Coordinates: 25°18′N 82°59′E
- Country: India
- State: Uttar Pradesh
- District: Varanasi
- City: Varanasi

Government
  - Type: Municipal Corporation
  - Body: Varanasi Nagar Nigam

Languages
  - Official: Hindi
- Time zone: UTC+5:30 (IST)
- PIN: 221010
- Website: UP Official Website

Sigra is an urban locality in the city of Varanasi, Uttar Pradesh, India. The residence of the Mayor of Varanasi is also located on Ghanti Mill Road in Sigra.

== Facilities ==
The famous 10,000-seater Dr Sampurnanand Sports Stadium, used mostly for cricket, is located in Sigra.
