= List of mayors of Varanasi =

Varanasi Mayoral Constituency is one of the 14 mayoral constituencies of Uttar Pradesh.

== Total Number of Voters ==
Election	Polling Stations	Male Voters	Female Voters	Total Voters
2017	274	5,91,606	4,93,694	10,85,300

== List of Mayors ==
Year	Member	Political Party
1995	Saroj Singh	Bharatiya Janata Party
2000	Amar Nath Yadav	Bharatiya Janata Party
2006	Kaushalendra Singh Patel	Bharatiya Janata Party
2012	Ram Gopal Mohale	Bharatiya Janata Party
2017	Mridula Jaiswal	Bharatiya Janata Party
2023	Ashok Kumar tiwari	Bharatiya Janata Party

== Election results ==
Uttar Pradesh Local Body Election, 2017: Varanasi
Party	Candidate	Votes	%	±%
BJP	Mridula Jaiswal	1,92,188	42.53	
INC	Shalini Yadav	1,13,345	25.08	
SP	Sadhana Gupta	99,272	21.97	
BSP	Sudha Chaurasiya	28,959	6.41	
SBSP	Arti Devi	8,082	1.79	
IND.	Anita	4,756	1.05	
NOTA	None of the Above	5,335	1.18	
Majority		78,843	17.45	
Turnout		4,51,937	41.64	
BJP hold		Swing		
