= Rikabganj =

Coordinates: 26.7800°N 82.1430°E

- Suburb
- Location in Uttar Pradesh, India Rikabganj (India)
- Country: India
- State: Uttar Pradesh
- District: Ayodhya
- City: Ayodhya

Government
  - Type: Municipal Corporation
  - Body: Ayodhya Municipal Corporation
- Elevation: 1,346 m (4,416 ft)

Population (2011)
  - Total: 15,985
  - Rank: 3

Languages
  - Official: Hindi
- Time zone: UTC+5:30 (IST)
- PIN: 224001
- Vehicle registration: UP 42
- Sex ratio: 1000/992 ♂/♀
- Website: up.gov.in

Rikabganj is a Suburb located in Ayodhya city in the Indian state of Uttar Pradesh and is sub post office of Ayodhya.

== Demographics ==
As of 2011 India census, Rikabganj had a population of 15,990. Males constitute 51% of the population and females 49%. Rikabganj has an average literacy rate of 62%, lower than the national average of 74.04% (Census 2011): male literacy is 71%, and female literacy is 52%. In Rikabganj, 17% of the population is under 6 years of age.

Religions in Rikabganj
Religion	Percent
Hindus	85%
Muslims	2%
Jains	13%
Others†	0%
Distribution of religions †Includes Sikhs (0%), Buddhists (<0%).
