= Lumla Assembly constituency =

Constituency of the Arunachal Pradesh legislative assembly in India

Coordinates: 27.53°N 91.72°E

Lumla
- Constituency No. 1 for the Arunachal Pradesh Legislative Assembly

Constituency details
- Country: India
- Region: Northeast India
- State: Arunachal Pradesh
- District: Tawang
- Lok Sabha constituency: Arunachal West
- Established: 1978
- Total electors: 9,917
- Reservation: ST

Member of Legislative Assembly
- 11th Arunachal Pradesh Legislative Assembly
- Incumbent Tsering Lhamu
- Party: BJP
- Alliance: NDA
- Elected year: 2024

Lumla Assembly constituency is one of the 60 assembly constituencies of Arunachal Pradesh, a northeastern state of India. It is part of Arunachal East Lok Sabha constituency.

== Boundaries ==
As per Delimitation Commission of India report 2008, No 1 Lumla(ST) consists of Lumla circle excluding villages Bongleng and Kharung, Zemithang circle and Kudung, Pamaghar, Sakpret and Thongleng villages of Tawang Circle.

== Members of the Legislative Assembly ==
Year	Member	Party
1990	Karma Wangchu	Indian National Congress
1995	T. G. Rinpoche	Independent politician
1999	T. G. Rinpoche	Indian National Congress
2004	T. G. Rinpoche	Indian National Congress
2009	Jambey Tashi	Indian National Congress
2014	Jambey Tashi	Indian National Congress
2019	Jambey Tashi	Bharatiya Janata Party
2023 By-election	Tsering Lhamu	Bharatiya Janata Party
2024	Tsering Lhamu	Bharatiya Janata Party

== Election results ==
=== Assembly Election 2024 ===
2024 Arunachal Pradesh Legislative Assembly election: Lumla
Party	Candidate	Votes	%	±%
BJP	Tsering Lhamu	5,040	58.51%	New
INC	Jampa Thirnly Kunkhap	3,509	40.74%	New
NOTA	Nota	65	0.75%	New
Margin of victory		1,531	17.77%	
Turnout		8,614	86.86%	▲86.86
Registered electors		9,917		▲8.16
BJP hold		Swing		

=== Assembly By-election 2023 ===
2023 Arunachal Pradesh Legislative Assembly by-election : Lumla
Party	Candidate	Votes	%	±%
BJP	Tsering Lhamu	Unopposed		
Registered electors		9,169		▲2.81
BJP hold		Swing		

=== Assembly Election 2019 ===
2019 Arunachal Pradesh Legislative Assembly election: Lumla
Party	Candidate	Votes	%	±%
BJP	Jambey Tashi	4,567	57.15%	New
NPP	Jampa Thirnly Kunkhap	3,279	41.03%	New
NOTA	Nota	145	1.81%	New
Margin of victory		1,288	16.12%	▼4.86
Turnout		7,991	89.61%	▲2.20
Registered electors		8,918		▲9.06
BJP gain from INC		Swing		

=== Assembly Election 2014 ===
2014 Arunachal Pradesh Legislative Assembly election: Lumla
Party	Candidate	Votes	%	±%
INC	Jambey Tashi	4,254	59.52%	New
Independent	Heg Tse Rinpoche	2,755	38.55%	New
NOTA	None of the Above	138	1.93%	New
Margin of victory		1,499	20.97%	
Turnout		7,147	87.40%	▲87.40
Registered electors		8,177		▲1.93
INC hold		Swing		

=== Assembly Election 2009 ===
2009 Arunachal Pradesh Legislative Assembly election: Lumla
Party	Candidate	Votes	%	±%
INC	Jambey Tashi	Unopposed		
Registered electors		8,022		▲14.49
INC hold		Swing		

=== Assembly Election 2004 ===
2004 Arunachal Pradesh Legislative Assembly election: Lumla
Party	Candidate	Votes	%	±%
INC	T. G. Rinpoche	3,318	53.79%	▼2.24
Independent	Jambey Wangdi	2,851	46.21%	New
Margin of victory		467	7.57%	▼4.48
Turnout		6,169	87.37%	▼1.93
Registered electors		7,007		▲7.62
INC hold		Swing		

=== Assembly Election 1999 ===
1999 Arunachal Pradesh Legislative Assembly election: Lumla
Party	Candidate	Votes	%	±%
INC	T. G. Rinpoche	3,282	56.03%	▲21.64
AC	Sange Nawang	2,576	43.97%	New
Margin of victory		706	12.05%	▼10.39
Turnout		5,858	91.54%	▼2.76
Registered electors		6,511		▲13.22
INC gain from Independent		Swing		

=== Assembly Election 1995 ===
1995 Arunachal Pradesh Legislative Assembly election: Lumla
Party	Candidate	Votes	%	±%
Independent	T. G. Rinpoche	3,031	56.83%	New
INC	Jambey Wangdi	1,834	34.39%	▼28.73
Independent	Rinchin Norbu Gengla	468	8.78%	New
Margin of victory		1,197	22.45%	▼3.79
Turnout		5,333	94.64%	▲13.91
Registered electors		5,751		▲2.26
Independent gain from INC		Swing		

=== Assembly Election 1990 ===
1990 Arunachal Pradesh Legislative Assembly election: Lumla
Party	Candidate	Votes	%	±%
INC	Karma Wangchu	2,798	63.12%	New
JD	Rinchin Norbu Gengla	1,635	36.88%	New
Margin of victory		1,163	26.24%	
Turnout		4,433	81.21%	
Registered electors		5,624		
INC win (new seat)				

== See also ==
- Tawang district
- List of constituencies of Arunachal Pradesh Legislative Assembly
