= 2029 elections in India =

2029 Indian elections
- ← 2027 2028 2029 2030 2031 →
- Incumbent Prime Minister: Narendra Modi (BJP)
- Next Lok Sabha: 19th

State elections
- States contested: 8

The 2029 Elections in India are expected to include the elections of the House of the People, Council of States , 7 State Legislative Assembly Elections, 1 Union Territory Legislative Assembly Election, 6 State Legislative Council Elections and various Local Body Elections.

== Lok Sabha Election ==
Tentative Date	Incumbent		Elected
Tentative Date	Party	PM	PM
May or June 2029	Bharatiya Janata Party	Narendra Modi	TBD

== Legislative Assembly Elections ==
Date(s)	State/UT	Incumbent		Elected		Maps
Date(s)	State/UT	Party	CM	Party	CM	Maps
April 2029	Andhra Pradesh	Telugu Desam Party	Nara Chandrababu Naidu	TBD		
April 2029	Arunachal Pradesh	Bharatiya Janata Party	Pema Khandu	TBD		
April 2029	Odisha	Bharatiya Janata Party	Mohan Charan Majhi	TBD		
April 2029	Sikkim	Sikkim Krantikari Morcha	Prem Singh Tamang	TBD		
October/ November 2029	Jammu and Kashmir	Jammu and Kashmir National Conference	Omar Abdullah	TBD		
October/ November 2029	Jharkhand	Jharkhand Mukti Morcha	Hemant Soren	TBD		
October/ November 2029	Haryana	Bharatiya Janata Party	Nayab Singh Saini	TBD		
October/ November 2029	Maharashtra	Bharatiya Janata Party	Devendra Fadnavis	TBD		

== Local Body Elections ==
=== Assam ===
Date	Autonomous Council	Government Before	Government After
TBD	Dima Hasao	BJP	TBD

=== Punjab ===
Date	Municipal Corporation	Government Before	Government After
TBD	Amritsar	AAP	TBD
TBD	Jalandhar	AAP	TBD
TBD	Patiala	AAP	TBD
TBD	Ludhiana	AAP	TBD
TBD	Phagwara	AAP	TBD

== See also ==
- 2028 elections in India
