= Manglesh Kumar Srivastava =

Indian politician

Dr Manglesh Kumar Srivastava
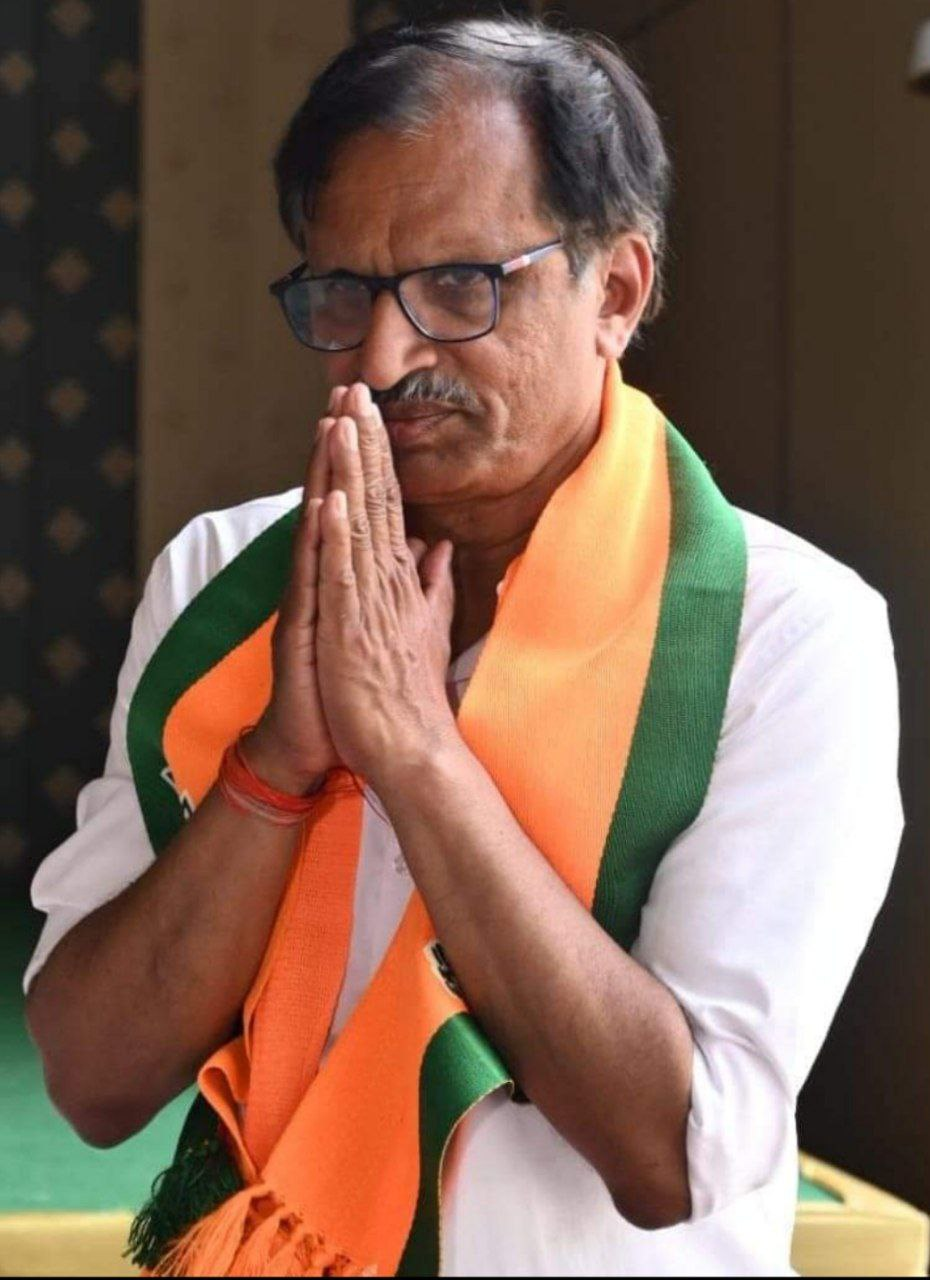

Mayor of Gorakhpur
- Incumbent
- Assumed office May 2023
- Appointed by: Elected by voters

Member of Gorakhpur Municipal Corporation
- Preceded by: Sitaram Jaiswal

Personal details
- Born: 1 July 1961 (age 65) Gorakhpur, Uttar Pradesh, India
- Party: Bharatiya Janata Party (2023–present)
- Spouse: Name not publicly available
- Children: Divyanshu Srivastava
- Education: Ganesh Shankar Vidyarthi Memorial Medical College
- Profession: Politician; Physician

Manglesh Kumar Srivastava (born 1 July 1961) is an Indian politician and physician serving as the Mayor of Gorakhpur since 2023. He is also the Senior Vice-President of the All India Council of Mayors and a former director of Tilak Pathology. A member of the Bharatiya Janata Party, he has been active in the medical community and municipal governance for several decades.

== Personal life ==
Manglesh was born on 1 July 1961 in Gorakhpur to Adya Prasad and Shushila Devi. He completed his MBBS and MD in Pathology from Ganesh Shankar Vidyarthi Memorial Medical College.

He is married and has children. His younger son, Divyanshu Srivastava, is an Assistant Professor in the Department of Dermatology at BRD Medical College, Gorakhpur.

His family has longstanding ties to the Gorakhnath Temple, and both his father and he have been involved in local community and educational institutions.

== Medical career ==
Srivastava has served as the director of Tilak Pathology. He was president of the Indian Medical Association (IMA) Gorakhpur in 2020, and has been Secretary of the Pathology Association, Gorakhpur. He is also a member of the Indian Association of Pathologists and Microbiologists and the Indian Association of Cytology.

== Political career ==
=== Early political involvement ===
Srivastava is a member of the Rashtriya Swayamsevak Sangh and became vice president of Saraswati Shishu Mandir, Saraswati Shiksha Samiti.

=== Mayor election 2023 ===
He won the 2023 Uttar Pradesh municipal elections for Mayor of Gorakhpur with 2,14,983 votes against the Samajwadi Party candidate Kajal Nishad, who received 1,47,957 votes.

Bidding adieu to the gown-wearing tradition, the Mayor Manglesh Srivastav took oath as the new mayor of Gorakhpur, donning a saffron Pagri and a scarf with the BJP symbol, on 27 May 2023. He said it is the right time to shun the gown as the country had completed 75 years of independence.

=== Awards and recognition ===
- 4th rank nationally in Swachh Survekshan 2023.
- National honour for water conservation efforts.
- International WaterTech Award for smart flood management.
- 'Prez Award' for central scheme benefits distribution.

== Election results ==
Year	Constituency	Party	Votes	Opponent	Opponent votes	Result
2023	Gorakhpur Mayor	Bharatiya Janata Party	2,14,983	Samajwadi Party	1,47,957	Won

== See also ==
- 2023 Uttar Pradesh municipal elections
- List of urban local bodies in Uttar Pradesh
