= Dr Sampurnanand Sports Stadium =

Football stadium in Uttar Pradesh, India

Coordinates: 25.314897°N 82.986597°E

Dr. Sampurnanand Sports Stadium
- Sigra Stadium
- Location: Sigra, Varanasi, Uttar Pradesh
- Country: India
- Establishment: 2022; 3 years ago
- Capacity: 500
- Tenants: Inter Kashi; Uttar Pradesh football team

Dr Sampurnanand Multipurpose Sports Stadium, nicknamed Sigra Stadium, is located in Varanasi, Uttar Pradesh. It is the main city stadium where most of football matches are held.

== History ==
The ground is managed by the Government of Uttar Pradesh. This stadium is a multi-dimensional sports facility with excellent support features. The ground was host to a varied set of state and national level events; this complex has volleyball, association football, and kabaddi grounds. Also known as Sigra Stadium, this facility hosts a range of cultural and entertainment events of the locality as well. Training sessions of different events are held here on a daily basis and lot of youngsters from the area are the beneficiaries.

== Ranji Trophy matches ==
#	Team 1	Team 2	Winner	Year
1	Uttar Pradesh	Madhya Pradesh	Uttar Pradesh	1964
2	Uttar Pradesh	Rajasthan	Rajasthan	1970
3	Uttar Pradesh	Madhya Pradesh	Uttar Pradesh	1978
4	Uttar Pradesh	Baroda	Match Draw	1988
5	Uttar Pradesh	Baroda	Match Draw	2003
6	Uttar Pradesh	Railways	Railways	2003
