= Shramik Vikas Sangathan =

Indian trade union in Delhi

- Shramik Vikas Sangathan
- श्रमिक विकास संगठन
- Founded: 25 October 2016; 9 years ago
- Affiliations: Aam Aadmi Party

Shramik Vikas Sangathan (SVS; transl. Labour Development Organization) is a trade union in the state of Keralam, India. It was launched as the labour wing of the Aam Aadmi Party in October 2016.
