= Prayagraj Municipal Corporation =

Local civic body in Prayagraj, India

Prayagraj Municipal Corporation Prayagraj Nagar Nigam
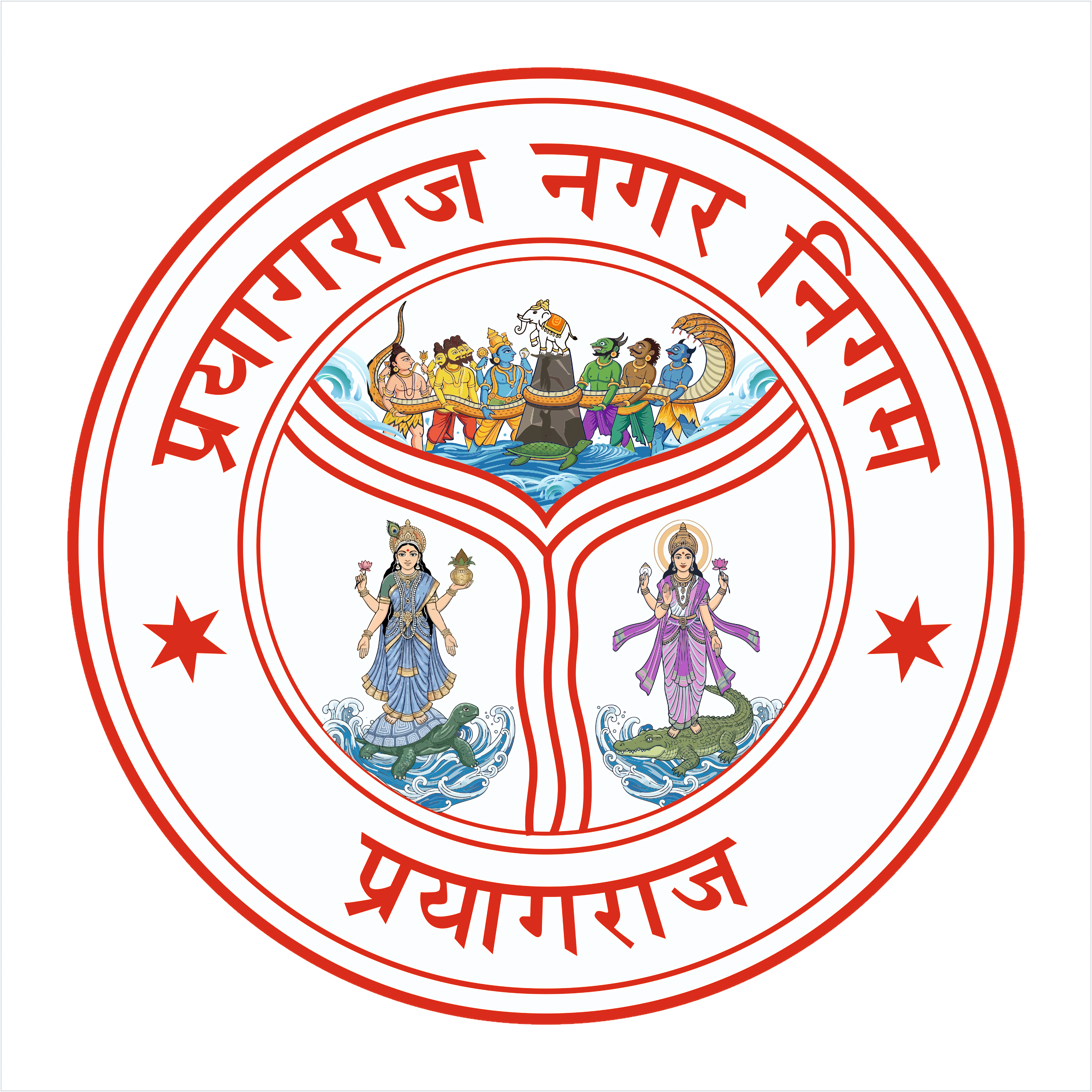
- Emblem of the Prayagraj Municipal Corporation

Type
- Type: Municipal Corporation

Leadership
- Mayor: Ganesh Kesarwani, BJP
- District Magistrate: Navneet Singh Chahal, IAS

Structure
- Seats: 100
- Political groups: Government (57): BJP (56); NISHAD (1); Opposition (43): SP (16); INC (4); BSP (2); AIMIM (2); IND (19)

Elections
- Voting system: First past the post
- Last election: 4 May 2023
- Next election: 2028

Meeting place
- Prayagraj, Uttar Pradesh

Prayagraj Municipal Corporation (formerly known as Allahabad Municipal Corporation) is the governing civic body of Prayagraj city in Uttar Pradesh. It is responsible for the civic infrastructure and administration of the city. It was established in 1863 as the Municipal Board of Allahabad under the act of 26 of 1850. The board was changed to corporation in 1959. It administers an area of 365 km^{2} (141 sq mi).

== List of Mayors ==
Year	Member	Political Party
1995	Prof. Rita Bahuguna Joshi	Independent
2000	Dr. K. P. Srivastava	Samajwadi Party
2006	Chaudhary Jitendra Nath Singh	Indian National Congress
2012	Abhilasha Gupta Nandi	Independent
2017	Abhilasha Gupta Nandi	Bharatiya Janata Party
2023	Ganesh Chandra Kesarwani	Bharatiya Janata Party

== Election results ==
Uttar Pradesh Local Body Election, 2023: Allahabad
Party	Candidate	Votes	%	±%
BJP	Ganesh Kesarwani	235,675		
SP	Ajay Kumar Srivastava	106,286		
INC	Prabha Shankar Mishra	40,486		
BSP	Saeed Ahmad	36,799		
Majority		129,389		
Turnout				
BJP hold		Swing		

Uttar Pradesh Local Body Election, 2017: Allahabad
Party	Candidate	Votes	%	±%
BJP	Abhilasha Gupta	131,297	40.30	
SP	Vinod Chandra Dubey	67,913	20.84	
INC	Vijay Mishra	64,579	19.82	
BSP	Ramesh Chandra Kesarwani	24,969	7.66	
IND.	Phool Chandra Dubey	10,086	3.10	
AAP	Salil Srivastava	4,695	1.44	
NOTA	None of the Above	1,544	0.47	
Majority		63,384	19.46	
Turnout		325,811	30.32	
BJP gain from Independent		Swing		
