= Harikant Ahluwalia =

Indian politician

Mayor of the Meerut Municipal Corporation
- Incumbent
- Assumed office 2023

Personal details
- Party: Bhartiya Janata Party

Harikant Ahluwalia is an Indian politician from Uttar Pradesh who represented the Bharatiya Janata Party in the recent Meerut Municipal Corporation election. He is elected as the Mayor of Meerut.
