= Tsering Lhamu =

Indian politician

Assembly Member for Legislative Assembly of Arunachal Pradesh
- Incumbent
- Assumed office 10 February 2023

Personal details
- Party: Bharatiya Janata Party (BJP)
- Spouse: Jambey Tashi
- Children: 3
- Profession: Politician

Tsering Lhamu is an Indian politician who is serving as Member of Arunachal Pradesh Legislative Assembly from the Lumla Assembly constituency.

Tsering Lhamu was the wife of former MLA Jambey Tashi.
