= Agra Municipal Corporation =

Local civic body in Agra, Uttar Pradesh, India

Agra Municipal Corporation Agra Nagar Nigam

Type
- Type: Municipal Corporation

Leadership
- Mayor: Hemlata Divakar, BJP
- Municipal Commissioner: Ankit Khandelwal, IAS

Structure
- Seats: 100
- Political groups: Government (58): BJP (58); Opposition (42): BSP (27); SP (3); INC (1); IND (11)

Elections
- Voting system: First past the post
- Last election: 4 May 2023
- Next election: 2028

Meeting place
- Agra, Uttar Pradesh

Website
- nagarnigamagra.com

Agra Municipal Corporation or Agra Nagar Nigam is the Municipal Corporation responsible for the civic infrastructure and administration of the city of Agra in India. The organisation is also known as AMC or ANN. This civic administrative body administers the city's cleanliness and other public services like public health and parks. The head of the AMC is the mayor.

The AMC is responsible for public education, correctional institutions, libraries, public safety, recreational facilities, sanitation, water supply, local planning and welfare services. The mayor and councillors are elected to five-year terms.

== List of mayors ==
| Year | Member | Winning party | Votes | Winning Margin | Runner-up Party |
|---|---|---|---|---|---|
| 2006 | Anjula Singh Mahaur | Bharatiya Janata Party | 1,36,637 | 26,335 | Independent |
| 2012 | Inderjeet Singh Arya | Bharatiya Janata Party | 1,35,647 | 12,434 | Bahujan Samaj Party |
| 2017 | Naveen Kumar Jain | Bharatiya Janata Party | 2,17,881 | 74,000 | Bahujan Samaj Party |
| 2023 | Hemalata Diwakar | Bharatiya Janata Party | 2,67,925 | – | Bahujan Samaj Party |

== Wards ==
| Zone | Ward Number | Ward Name | Assembly Constituency | Councillor | Political Group |
|---|---|---|---|---|---|
| Chatta | 1 | Kajipada | | Gyanwati | |
| Taj Ganj | 2 | Gummat Takh Pahalwan | | Sunita Devi | |
| Loha Mandi | 3 | Jagdishpura Pachim | | Mahesh Kumar Sanvedi | |
| Taj Ganj | 4 | Sewla Jat | | Anjana Chaurasiya | |
| Taj Ganj | 5 | Himachal Colony | | Sunita Arya | |
| Loha Mandi | 6 | Ghas Ki Mandi | | Shivam Sagar | |
| Hari Parvat | 7 | Jagdishpura Purvi | | Machala Devi | |
| Loha Mandi | 8 | Khataina | | Kavita | |
| Taj Ganj | 9 | Idgah | | Kamlesh Saun | |
| Hari Parvat | 10 | Charsu Darwaza | | Mansha Devi Rajoura | |
| Loha Mandi | 11 | Nagla Mohan | | Anita Khare | |
| Hari Parvat | 12 | Nagla Harmukh | | Ashok Kumar | |
| Chatta | 13 | Kachhpura | | Harimohan | |
| Taj Ganj | 14 | Saray Malukchand | | Ajay Kumar | |
| Chatta | 15 | Dholikhar | | Brijmohan | |
| Chatta | 16 | Ratanpura | | Dharamveer Singh | |
| Loha Mandi | 17 | Rajnagar | | Bunti Mahour | |
| Loha Mandi | 18 | Ram Nagar | | Manoj Kumar | |
| Taj Ganj | 19 | Bundu Katra | | Mahesh Chandra Bhaskar | |
| Chatta | 20 | Freeganj | | Manoj Kumar | |
| Loha Mandi | 21 | Barakhamba | | Nitya Prakash | |
| Taj Ganj | 22 | Souhalla | | Sonu | |
| Taj Ganj | 23 | Mahdev Nagar | | | |
| Taj Ganj | 24 | Mohanpura | | Rajendra Singh Mahour | |
| Loha Mandi | 25 | Gadhi Bhadouriya | | Rishabh Raja | |
| Loha Mandi | 26 | Bhogipura | | Ashish Parashar | |
| Chatta | 27 | Bagh Muzaffar Khan | | Bhagwan Singh | |
| Hari Parvat | 28 | Jageshwar Nagar | | Amit Kumar | |
| Taj Ganj | 29 | Dhandhupura | | Jagmohan | |
| Loha Mandi | 30 | Kedar Nagar | | Umesh Kumar Perwani | |
| Loha Mandi | 31 | Ajeet Nagar | | Jai Singh Sardara | |
| Chatta | 32 | Nai Ki Saray | | Mithlesh | |
| Hari Parvat | 33 | Khandari | | Ajay Kumar | |
| Hari Parvat | 34 | Lawyers Colony | | Fauran Singh | |
| Chatta | 35 | Dera Saras | | Ravindra | |
| Taj Ganj | 36 | Mustafa Quarter | | Anita | |
| Loha Mandi | 37 | Nagla Ajeeta | | Neeraj Parashar | |
| Hari Parvat | 38 | Gailana | | Viklesh Yadav | |
| Taj Ganj | 39 | Namner | | Laxmi Sharma | |
| Loha Mandi | 40 | Ajampada | | Rahul Chaudhary | |
| Taj Ganj | 41 | Baluganj | | Sapna Jain | |
| Loha Ganj | 42 | Rahul Nagar Bodla | | Deepak Agarwal | |
| Chatta | 43 | Bhagwati Bag | | Bhupendra Kumar Sharma | |
| Hari Parvat | 44 | Ghatwasan | | Hari Kumari | |
| Taj Ganj | 45 | Karta Fulel | | Radhika Agarwal | |
| Loha Mandi | 46 | Ashok Nagar | | Rajesh Kumar Prajapati | |
| Loha Mandi | 47 | Avas Vikas Poorvi | | Manjula Singh | |
| Hari Parvat | 48 | Ghatiya Azam Khan | | Shiromani Singh | |
| Taj Ganj | 49 | Naripura | | Seema Devi | |
| Chatta | 50 | Sita Nagar | | Jitendra Singh | |
| Hari Parvat | 51 | Dev Nagar | | Vivek Tomar | |
| Chatta | 52 | Mantola | | Gulshanovar Begum | |
| Chatta | 53 | Trans Yamuna Colony | | Prakash Keshwani | |
| Loha Mandi | 54 | Jaipur House | | Mukul Garg | |
| Chatta | 55 | Shahdara | | Meena Singh | |
| Hari Parvat | 56 | Lohiya Nagar | | Amit Agarwal (Gwala) | |
| Taj Ganj | 57 | Ukharra | | Usha Indoliya | |
| Chatta | 58 | Naraich Pachim | | Shashi | |
| Taj Ganj | 59 | Nagla Mewati | | Mohan Singh Lodhi | |
| Chatta | 60 | Naraich Poorva | | Pushpa Kushwaha | |
| Taj Ganj | 61 | Khwaspura | | Zarina Begum | |
| Hari Parvat | 62 | Sarla Bagh | | Rajeshwari Chaudhary | |
| Taj Ganj | 63 | Telipara | | Hemendra Pal Singh | |
| Taj Ganj | 64 | Chawli | | Bhavutosh Chaudhary | |
| Chatta | 65 | Belanganj | | Anurag Chaturvedi | |
| Chatta | 66 | Yamuna Par Prakash Nagar | | Sarvesh Devi | |
| Chatta | 67 | Nawal ganj | | Abdul Salam | |
| Chatta | 68 | Noori Darwaza | | Praveen Patel | |
| Loha Mandi | 69 | Awas Vikas South | | Kalpana Sikarwar | |
| Taj Ganj | 70 | Tal Firoz Khan | | Karm Veer Singh | |
| | 71 | Dahtora | | | |
| Hari Parvat | 72 | Nagla Padi | | Rekha Kushwaha | |
| Loha Mandi | 73 | Alvatiya | | | |
| Hari Parvat | 74 | Sikandra | | Binu Sikarwar | |
| Loha Mandi | 75 | Awas Vikas West | | Sushma Jain | |
| Loha Mandi | 76 | Dhakran | | Om Prakash Dhakad | |
| Taj Ganj | 77 | Shaheed Nagar | | Jagdish Sharma (Pachauri) | |
| Chatta | 78 | Motiganj | | Rakesh Jain | |
| Hari Parvat | 79 | Jatpura | | Sharad Chauhan | |
| Hari Parvat | 80 | Kamla Nagar Block A-B-C-D | | Savita Agrawal | |
| Hari Parvat | 81 | Bheem Nagar | | Arpit Saraswat | |
| Chatta | 82 | Tedi Bagiya | | Hori Lal | |
| Loha Mandi | 83 | Raja Mandi | | Mohan Sharma | |
| Hari Parvat | 84 | Kaveri Kunj | | Hariom Goyal | |
| Loha Mandi | 85 | Khati Pada | | Priyanka Prajapati | |
| Hari Parvat | 86 | Vijay Nagar Colony | | Neha Gupta | |
| Hari Parvat | 87 | Bhood Ka Bag Kamla Nagar | | Ravi Sharma | |
| | 88 | KK Nagar | | | |
| Taj Ganj | 89 | Hajjupura | | Sobha Ram Rathore | |
| Loha Mandi | 90 | Rammohan Nagar | | Shyam Veer Singh | |
| Hari Parvat | 91 | Balkeshwar | | Vimal Gupta | |
| Chatta | 92 | Rawatpada | | Varsha Sharma | |
| Hari Parvat | 93 | Wajirpura | | Gulab Singh | |
| Hari Parvat | 94 | Kamla Nagar Block E-F-G | | Pradeep Agarwal | |
| Hari Parvat | 95 | Bagh Farzana | | Sanjay Rai | |
| Chatta | 96 | Dhankot Fubbara | | Bachhu Singh | |
| Taj Ganj | 97 | Gover Chowki | | Kamlesh Rathore | |
| Taj Ganj | 98 | Vibhav Nagar | | Sunil Rathore | |
| Chatta | 99 | Pipal Mandi | | Ravi Bihari Mathur | |
| Chatta | 100 | Nai Ki Mandi | | Manish Kumar Dhakad | |

== Some of the key projects ==
- Solar City Plan for Agra
- Nala Safai Project
- Metro Rail in Agra
- Agra Lucknow Expressway
- Night Markets in Agra

== See also ==
- List of municipal corporations in India
