= Ghaziabad Municipal Corporation =

Civic body that governs Ghaziabad city

Ghaziabad Municipal Corporation Ghaziabad Nagar Nigam

Type
- Type: Municipal Corporation

History
- Founded: 31 August 1994

Leadership
- Mayor: Sunita Dayal, BJP
- Municipal Commissioner: Vikramaditya Singh Malik, IAS

Structure
- Seats: 100
- Political groups: Government (66): BJP (66); Opposition (34): SP (5); BSP (5); INC (3); AAP (3); AJP (2); AIMIM (2); IND (14)

Elections
- Voting system: First past the post
- Last election: 11 May 2023
- Next election: 2028

Motto
- (Hindi: ईमानदारी सत्यनिष्ठा कर्तव्यपरायणता) "(Honesty, Integrity, Dutifulness)"

Meeting place
- Ghaziabad, Uttar Pradesh

Website
- www.ghaziabadnagarnigam.in

The Ghaziabad Nagar Nigam (GNN), also known as Ghaziabad Municipal Corporation (GMC) is the civic body that governs Ghaziabad city. Established under the Uttar Pradesh Municipal Corporation Act-1959, it is responsible for the civic infrastructure and administration of the city.It covers area equal to 210 square kilometres.

== Demographic ==
According to Official voter data published by the Election Commission of India,has provided community-wise estimates for the Ghaziabad Lok Sabha constituency. Ghaziabad Lok Sabha constituency has a diverse caste composition with Rajputs considered the most dominant community in the district. The constituency is estimated to have nearly 600,000 to 7 lakh Rajput voters, around 550,000 Muslims, 450,000 Brahmins, 450,000 Scheduled Caste voters, 250,000 Banias, 125,000 Jats, 100,000 Punjabis, 75,000 Tyagis and 70,000 Gujjars. The district has more than 150 Tomar (Tanwar) Rajput villages and over 84 Gehlot Rajput villages. The historic Satha-Chaurasi region also falls within the district, taking the total number of Rajput-dominated villages to over 250 across Ghaziabad district. Several prominent Rajput leaders have represented the constituency, including Rajnath Singh, who was elected twice as Member of Parliament from Ghaziabad, General V. K. Singh, who also served two terms as MP, and Dr. Ramesh Chandra Singh Tomar, who represented the constituency five times in the Lok Sabha. Former MLA Sukhbir Singh Gehlot was also a notable Rajput leader from the region, reflecting the political influence of the Rajput community in Ghaziabad district.

== Wards ==
Ghaziabad Municipal corporation is divided into 5 zones - City Zone, Kavi Nagar Zone, Vijay Nagar Zone, Mohan Nagar Zone and Vasundhara Zone. The Municipal Corporation comprises 100 wards, with councillors elected from each ward. The local elections to all wards was last held in 2023.

== Departments ==
1. PUBLIC WORKS DEPARTMENT
2. I.T. DEPARTMENT
3. PROPERTY TAX DEPARTMENT
4. HEALTH DEPARTMENT
5. STREET LIGHT DEPARTMENT
6. WATER WORKS DEPARTMENT
7. LAW
8. GARDEN / HORTICULTURE
9. SWACHH BHARAT MISSION

== Total number of voters ==
Election	Polling Stations	Male Voters	Female Voters	Total Voters
2017	273	7,41,957	6,17,188	13,59,14+

== List of mayors ==
Year	Member	Political Party
2006	Damayanti Goel	Bharatiya Janata Party
2012	Teluram Kamboj	Bharatiya Janata Party
2016 (by-election)	Ashu Verma	Bharatiya Janata Party
2017	Asha Sharma	Bharatiya Janata Party
2023	Sunita Dayal	Bharatiya Janata Party

== List of current municipal councilors ==
These are 2017 results, latest list is unknown

No	Ward Name	Name	Political Party
1	Bagu Krishna Nagar	Neetu	BSP
2	Rahul Vihar	Manju	INDEPENDENT
3	Old Vijay Nagar	Bhagwat Swaroop	INDEPENDENT
4	Mata Colony	Gopal	BJP
5	Vihar	Pinky	BJP
6	Deen Dayal Puri	Sunaina Devi	BJP
7	Bihari Pura	Munni Devi	BJP
8	Nehru Nagar II	Mitalesh Titoria	BJP
9	Sibbanpura	Sheetal Deol	BJP
10	DLF Colony	Rekha Goswami	BJP
11	Nandgram Deen Dayal Puri	Chaya Tyagi	BJP
12	Kalka Garhi	Praveen Kumar	BJP
13	Ghukna	Rajni	BJP
14	New Vijay Nagar	Om Prakash Singh	BJP
15	Charan Singh Colony	Poonam Singh	BJP
16	Morta	Neelam	BJP
17	Seva Nagar	Jai Kishan	BJP
18	Shashtri Nagar Razapur	Shashi Singh	BSP
19	Patel Nagar Mukand Nagar	Urmila Chauhan	BJP
20	Bhopura	Yashpal	BJP
21	Bhowapur	Anand Kumar Gautam	INDEPENDENT
22	Daulatpura	Vineel Dutt	BJP
23	Kailash Nagar	Jagat Singh	INDEPENDENT
24	Mehrauli	Pawan Kumar Gautam	BJP
25	Ambedkar Nagar	Kanhaiya Lal	BJP
26	Madhopur	Rajkumar	BJP
27	Dundahera	Naresh Kumar	INDEPENDENT
28	Rajiv Colony	Sudhir	BJP
29	Kuri	Ompal Singh	BSP
30	Sadarpur	Rina	BJP
31	Nandgram Sihani	Nitin Kumar	INDEPENDENT
32	Krishna Nagar	Subash Singh	BSP
33	Sarai Nazar Ali	Dhirendra Yadav	INDEPENDENT
34	Shahid Nagar I	Khurshida Begum	SP
35	Akbarpur	Ritu Chaudhary	INDEPENDENT
36	Prahalad Garhi	Pratima Chaudhary	BJP
37	Shalimar Garden	Ravi Bhati	BJP
38	Arthala	Manoj Pal	BJP
39	Nasirpur	Udit Mohan	BJP
40	Sahibabad	Himanshu Chaudhary	BSP
41	Maharajpur	Bhupendra Kumar	BJP
42	Shahpur Bamheta	Parmosh Yadav	INDEPENDENT
43	Kadkad Model	Joginder Singh	INDEPENDENT
44	Sanjay Colony	Pavitra Devi	SP
45	Karhera	Sunanda Singh	BJP
46	Guldhar	Ajayvir Singh	BJP
47	Shahtri Nagar Mahendra Enclave	Amit Tyagi	BJP
48	Mirzapur	Sajida	SP
49	Nandgram Mariyam Nagar	Virendra Tyagi	BJP
50	Sadiq Nagar	Suman Lata	INC
51	Pratap Vihar Sector 11	Seema	BJP
52	Arya Nagar Kotgaon	Abhishek Chaudhary	BJP
53	Raispur	Suman	BJP
54	Vasundhara I	Satendra Pal Singh	BJP
55	Vijay Nagar Sec 11 E Block	Santosh Kumar Singh	BJP
56	Chiranjeev Vihar Avantika	Manoj Tyagi	BJP
57	Makanpur	Radheshyam Tyagi	BSP
58	Shivpuri	Dev Narayan Sharma	BJP
59	Chandrapuri	Rajiv Sharma	BJP
60	Shyam Park Main	Sachin Kumar	BJP
61	Vasundhara II	Shilpa Chaudhary	BJP
62	Govindpuram Harsaon	Manu Kumar	BJP
63	Pasaunda	Shehroz Parveen	AAP
64	Garima Garden	Tabassum Jahan	AIMIM
65	Vivekanand Nagar Jivan Vihar	Rajkumar Nagar	BJP
66	Mausam Vihar	Chowdhary Mustakim	AAP
67	Kamla Nehru Nagar Sanjay Nagar I	Ajay Sharma	INC
68	Brij Vihar	Vinay Kumar Chaudhary	BJP
69	Lohiya Nagar	Kuldeep	BJP
70	Janakpuri	Ram Niwas Bansal	BJP
71	Sanjay Nagar II	Umesh Nagar	BJP
72	Kaushambi	Kusum Goyal	INDEPENDENT
73	Shalimar Garden Extension	Rajiv Bhati	INDEPENDENT
74	Vasundhara III	Naresh Kumar Bhati	BJP
75	Lajpat Nagar I	Himanshu Sharma	AJP
76	Vaishali I	Gaurav Solanki	BJP
77	Vaishali II	Neelam Bhardwaj	BJP
78	Shalimar Garden Extension I	Omvati	BJP
79	Abhay Khand	Harish Chandra Singh	BJP
80	Rajendra Nagar sec 2	Rahul Sharma	BJP
81	Shakti Khand	Dheeraj Aggarwal	BJP
82	Jawahar Park	Kiran	BJP
83	Shyam Park Extension	Kavita	BJP
84	Raj Nagar	Praveen Kumar	BJP
85	Lajpat Nagar II	Pramod Kumar Raghav	BJP
86	Rajendra Nagar Sec 5	Madan Roy	BJP
87	Gyankhand Indirapuram	Anuj Tyagi	INDEPENDENT
88	Gandhi Nagar Turab Nagar	Neeraj	BJP
89	Vaishali III	Rajkumar Singh	BJP
90	Shahid Nagar II	Adil Malik	SP
91	Kavi Nagar	Shivam Sharma	BJP
92	Kaila Islam Nagar	Rubina	AIMIM
93	Kaila Bhatta	Simran Malik	SP
94	Surya Nagar	Krishna Mohan	BJP
95	Prem Nagar Kaila	Ruksana Saifi	AAP
96	Nehru Nagar III	Ajit Nigam	AJP
97	Ramprastha	Shri Bhagwan Agarwal	BJP
98	Ahinsa Khand	Anil Kumar Tomar	BJP
99	Vaibhav Khand I	Priti Jain	BJP
100	Shipra Suncity Indirapuram	Sanjay Kumar	BJP

== Mayor election results ==
Uttar Pradesh Local Body Election, 2023: Ghaziabad
Party	Candidate	Votes	%	±%
BJP	Sunita Dayal	3,50,905	58.12	
BSP	Nisara Khan	63,249	10.48	
INC	Pushpa Rawat	58,951	9.76	
SP	Poonam Yadav	57,608	9.54	
AIMIM	Shehnaz Dilshad	26,045	4.31	
AAP	Janki Bisht	21,232	3.52	
NOTA	None of the Above	4,950	0.82	
Majority		2,87,656	47.64	
Turnout		6,03,730	39.15	
BJP hold		Swing		

Uttar Pradesh Local Body Election, 2017: Ghaziabad
Party	Candidate	Votes	%	±%
BJP	Asha Sharma	2,82,793	49.86	
INC	Dolly Sharma	1,19,118	21.00	
BSP	Munni Chaudhary	77,033	13.58	
SP	Rashi Garg	40,623	7.16	
AAP	Dr. Pragati Tyagi	13,656	2.41	
NOTA	None of the Above	4,122	0.73	
Majority		1,63,675	28.86	
Turnout		5,67,118	41.73	
BJP hold		Swing		

By Election, 2016: Ghaziabad
Party	Candidate	Votes	%	±%
BJP	Ashu Kumar Verma	1,15,879	50.94	
SP	Sudhan Kumar Rawat	70,651	31.06	
INC	Lalman Singh	23,317	10.25	
Majority		45,228	19.88	
Turnout		2,27,484	18.54	
BJP hold		Swing		

Uttar Pradesh Local Body Election, 2012: Ghaziabad
Party	Candidate	Votes	%	±%
BJP	Telu Ram Kamboj	1,35,911		
IND.	Sudhan Kumar Rawat	1,26,328		
Majority		9,583		
Turnout		N/A		
BJP hold		Swing		
