= Varanasi Municipal Corporation =

Governing civic body of Varanasi, Uttar Pradesh

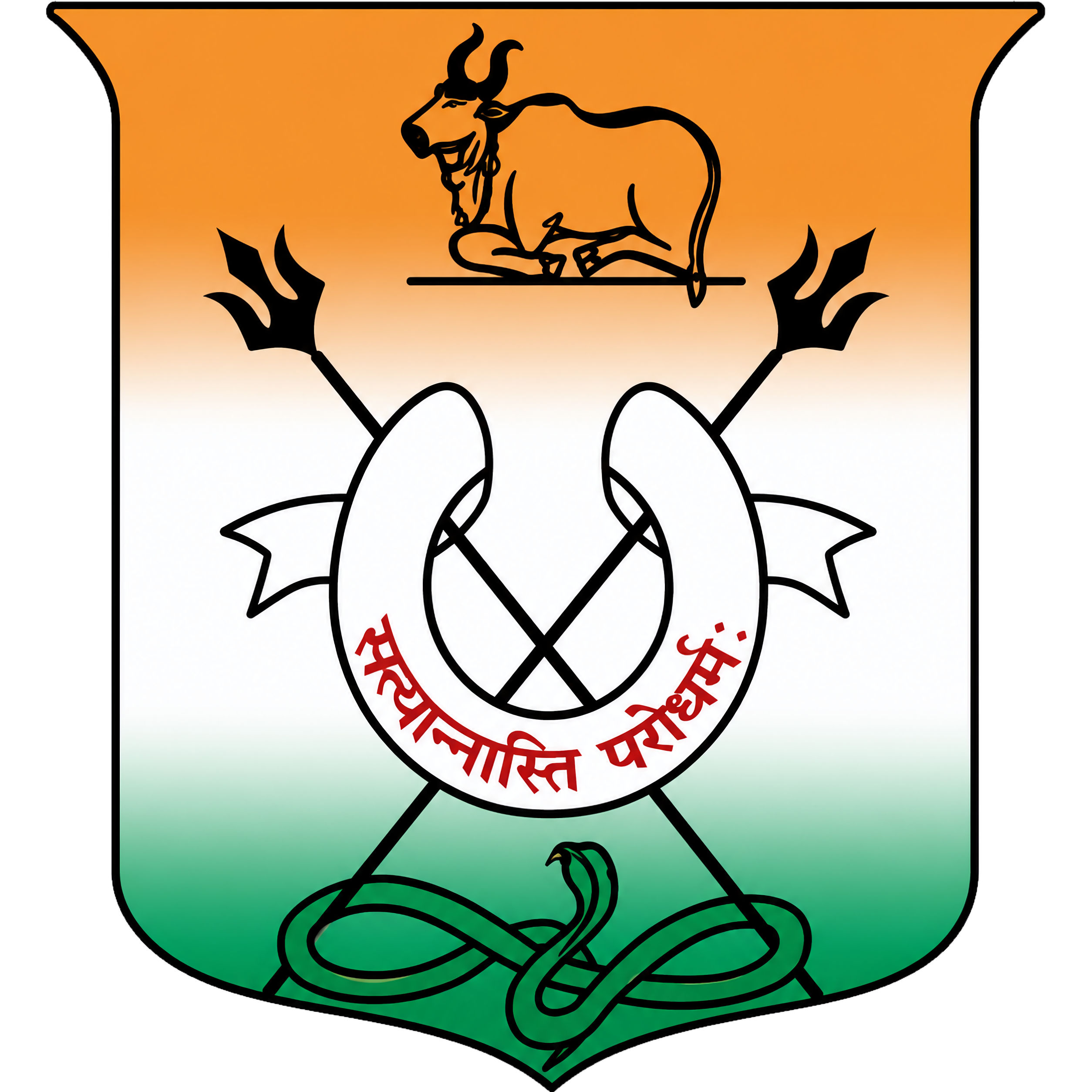
- Emblem of Varanasi Municipal Corporation

Type
- Type: Municipal Corporation of Varanasi

Leadership
- Mayor: Ashok Tiwari, BJP
- Municipal Commissioner: Himanshu Nagpal, IAS

Structure
- Seats: 100
- Political groups: Government (62): BJP (62); Opposition (38): SP (13); INC (9); IND (16)

Elections
- Voting system: First past the post
- Last election: 4 May 2023
- Next election: 2028

Meeting place
- Varanasi, Uttar Pradesh

Website
- https://nnvns.org.in:/

Varanasi Municipal Corporation is the governing body of the city of Varanasi in the Indian state of Uttar Pradesh. The municipal corporation consists of democratically elected members, is headed by a mayor, and administers the city's infrastructure and public services. Members from the state's leading various political parties hold elected offices in the corporation.

== History ==
Varanasi has been a metropolitan municipality with a mayor-council form of government. Varanasi Municipal Corporation was established on 24 January 1959 as a Nagar Mahapalika under the Municipal Corporation Act of 1959 and in 1994 it was ungraded to Nagar Nigam. With 110 wards and currently the total area under it is around 130 km^{2} (50 sq mi) and Kunj Bihari Gupta as cities first Mayor and P.K. Kaul as a Municipal Commissioner. The Varanasi Municipal Corporation is responsible for public education, correctional institutions, libraries, public safety, recreational facilities, sanitation, water supply, local planning, and welfare services. The mayor and councillors are elected to five-year terms.

Varanasi Municipal Corporation is part of various government schemes like Swachh Bharat Mission, Hriday, Amrut as well as Smart Cities Mission.

== List of Mayors ==
Year	Member	Political Party
1995	Saroj Singh	Bharatiya Janata Party
2000	Amar Nath Yadav	Bharatiya Janata Party
2006	Kaushalendra Singh Patel	Bharatiya Janata Party
2012	Ram Gopal Mohale	Bharatiya Janata Party
2017	Mridula Jaiswal	Bharatiya Janata Party
2023	Ashok Kumar tiwari	Bharatiya Janata Party

== Election results ==
Uttar Pradesh Local Body Election, 2023: Varanasi
Party	Candidate	Votes	%	±%
BJP	Ashok Kumar Tiwari	2,91,852		
SP	O P Singh	1,58,715		
INC	Anil Srivastava	94,288		
Majority		1,33,137		
Turnout				
BJP hold		Swing		

Uttar Pradesh Local Body Election, 2017: Varanasi
Party	Candidate	Votes	%	±%
BJP	Mridula Jaiswal	1,92,188	42.53	
INC	Shalini Yadav	1,13,345	25.08	
SP	Sadhana Gupta	99,272	21.97	
BSP	Sudha Chaurasiya	28,959	6.41	
SBSP	Arti Devi	8,082	1.79	
IND.	Anita	4,756	1.05	
NOTA	None of the Above	5,335	1.18	
Majority		78,843	17.45	
Turnout		4,51,937	41.64	
BJP hold		Swing		
