= Jambey Tashi =

Indian politician (died 2022)

Assembly Member for Legislative Assembly of Arunachal Pradesh
- In office May 2019 – 2 November 2022
- Preceded by: His Eminence Tsona Gontse Rinpoche

Personal details
- Born: c. 1978
- Died: 2 November 2022 (aged 44) Guwahati, Assam, India
- Party: Bharatiya Janata Party (BJP) (2016 - present); PPA (September 2016 - December 2016)
- Spouse: Tsering Lhamu
- Children: 3
- Relatives: Dorjee Khandu (father); Pema Khandu (brother)
- Education: Government Higher Secondary School Tawang and University of Delhi.
- Occupation: Public Leader
- Profession: Politician

Jambey Tashi (c. 1978 – 2 November 2022) was an Indian politician of the Bharatiya Janata Party in Arunachal Pradesh, serving as the MLA of 1-Lumla constituency. He was also a Member of National Minority Morcha, BJP. Tashi had previously been a member of the Indian National Congress and People's Party of Arunachal. He was the brother of the current Chief Minister of Arunachal Pradesh Pema Khandu.

In 2009, he was elected unopposed from 1-Lumla S/T Assembly Constituency on a Congress ticket. In the 2014 election for the 1-Lumla Legislative Assembly of Arunachal Pradesh he defeated Independent candidate Theg Tse Rinpoche, on a Congress ticket, by 1499 votes. In 2019 Legislative Assembly elections, he rode on a BJP ticket and defeated Jampa Thrinly Kunkhap of NPP by 1288 votes. Jambey Tashi garnered 4567 votes while Jampa Thrinly Kunkhap got 3279 votes. He was the incumbent Member of Legislative Assembly of the 1 Lumla (Arunachal Pradesh) constituency.

Tashi was one of 6 MLAs along with Chief Minister Pema Khandu to be suspended by the PPA for anti-party activities.

Tashi died on 2 November 2022, at the age of 44.
