= Firozabad Municipal Corporation =

Local civic body in Firozabad, Uttar Pradesh, India

Firozabad Municipal Corporation Firozabad Nagar Nigam

Type
- Type: Municipal Corporation

Leadership
- Mayor: Kamini Rathore, BJP
- Municipal Commissioner: Prerna Sharma, IAS

Structure
- Seats: 70
- Political groups: Government (32): BJP (32); Opposition (38): SP (15); IND (13); BSP (7); INC (1); AAP (1); AIMIM (1)

Elections
- Voting system: First past the post
- Last election: 4 May 2023
- Next election: 2028

Meeting place
- Firozabad, Uttar Pradesh

Website
- firozabadnagarnigam.com

Firozabad Municipal Corporation is the municipal corporation governing the Indian city of Firozabad. The Municipal Corporation mechanism in India was introduced during British Rule with the formation of municipal corporation in Madras (Chennai) in 1688, later followed by municipal corporations in Bombay (Mumbai) and Calcutta (Kolkata) by 1762. Firozabad Municipal Corporation is headed by the Mayor of city and governed by the Commissioner.

== History and administration ==
Firozabad Municipal Corporation was formed to improve the infrastructure of the town as per the needs of local population. Firozabad Municipal Corporation has been categorized into wards and each ward is headed by councillor for which elections are held every 5 years.

Firozabad Municipal Corporation is governed by mayor Smt Kamini Rathore and administered by Municipal Commissioner Smt Prerna Sharma.

== Functions ==
Firozabad Municipal Corporation was created for the following functions:

- Planning for the town including its surroundings which are covered under its Department's Urban Planning Authority.
- Approving construction of new buildings and authorising use of land for various purposes.
- Improvement of the town's economic and social status.
- Arrangements of water supply towards commercial, residential and industrial purposes.
- Planning for fire contingencies through Fire Service Departments.
- Creation of solid waste management, public health system and sanitary services.
- Working for the development of ecological aspects such as development of Urban Forestry and making guidelines for environmental protection.
- Working for the development of weaker sections of the society like mentally and physically handicapped, old age and gender-biased people.
- Making efforts for improvement of slums and poverty removal in the town.

== Revenue sources ==
The following are the income sources for the corporation from the Central and State Government.

=== Revenue from taxes ===
Following is the Tax related revenue for the corporation.

- Property tax.
- Profession tax.
- Entertainment tax.
- Grants from Central and State Government like Goods and Services Tax.
- Advertisement tax.

=== Revenue from non-tax sources ===
Following is the Non Tax related revenue for the corporation.

- Water usage charges.
- Fees from Documentation services.
- Rent received from municipal property.
- Funds from municipal bonds.

== See also ==
- List of municipal corporations in India
