= Aligarh Municipal Corporation =

Local civic body in Aligarh, Uttar Pradesh, India

Aligarh Municipal Corporation Aligarh Nagar Nigam

Type
- Type: Municipal Corporation

History
- Founded: November 1994

Leadership
- Mayor: Prashant Singhal, BJP
- Municipal Commissioner: Satya Prakash Patel

Structure
- Seats: 90
- Political groups: NDA (45): BJP (45); Opposition (45): SP (33); BSP (7); IND (4); INC (1)

Elections
- Voting system: First-past-the-post
- Last election: 11 May 2023
- Next election: 2028

Motto
- (Hindi: नगर का विकास, नगर निगम के साथ) (Development of City, With Municipal Corporation)

Meeting place
- Sewa Bhawan, Aligarh, Uttar Pradesh

Website
- www.nnaligarh.in

The Aligarh Nagar Nigam (ANN) – also known as Aligarh Municipal Corporation (AMC) – is the civic body that governs Aligarh city. Established under the Uttar Pradesh Municipal Corporation Act-1959, it is responsible for the civic infrastructure and administration of the city. The municipal corporation covers an area of 40 km^{2} (15 sq mi). The first mayor of Aligarh elections were held in 1995. As of 2023, Prashant Singhal from the Bharatiya Janata Party is current mayor of Aligarh Municipal Corporation.

== History ==
Aligarh Municipal Board (Nagar Palika) was established on 1 August 1885. In November 1994 after enactment of Uttar Pradesh Municipal Corporation Act 1959, it was further upgraded as Municipal Corporation (Nagar Nigam).

== Objective ==
AMC work for providing necessary community services like health care, educational institution, housing, transport etc. by collecting property tax and fixed grant from the Finance Commission and Government of Uttar Pradesh. Its sources of income are taxes on water, houses, markets, entertainment and vehicles paid by residents of the town and grants from the state government.

=== Wards ===
As of 2017, the Aligarh Municipal Corporation's legislature, also known as the Corporation Council, consists of 70 directly elected corporators.

List of wards in AMC in 2017 election
S. No.	Name of Ward	Name of Corporator	Political Party
1	Nagla Kalar	Yogesh Devi	BSP

== See also ==
- Aligarh division
- Aligarh district
- Aligarh (Lok Sabha constituency)
- Aligarh (Assembly constituency)
