= Aam Aadmi Party =

Political party in India

- Abbreviation: AAP
- Leader: Arvind Kejriwal
- Spokesperson: Saurabh Bhardwaj and others
- Rajya Sabha Leader: Sanjay Singh
- Lok Sabha Leader: Gurmeet Singh Meet Hayer
- Founder: Arvind Kejriwal, Prasant Bhushan, Yogendra Yadav and others
- Founded: 26 November 2012; 13 years ago
- Headquarters: 206, Deen Dayal Upadhyay Marg, New Delhi, Delhi, India 110002
- Student wing: Association of Students for Alternative Politics (ASAP); Chhatra Yuva Sangharsh Samiti (CYSS)
- Youth wing: AAP Youth Wing (AYW)
- Women's wing: AAP Mahila Shakti (AMS)
- Labour wing: Shramik Vikas Sangathan (SVS)
- Ideology: Populism; Secularism; Nationalism
- Political position: Centre
- Colours: Blue
- ECI status: National Party
- Alliance: INDIA (2023–25)
- Seats in Rajya Sabha: 3 / 245
- Seats in Lok Sabha: 3 / 543
- Seats in State Legislative Assemblies: 121 / 4,036 List 22 / 70 (Delhi) 94 / 117 (Punjab) 2 / 40 (Goa) 4 / 182 (Gujarat) 1 / 90 (Jammu and Kashmir)
- Number of states and union territories in government: 1 / 31

Election symbol
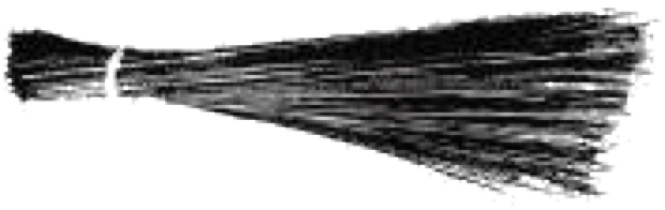

Party flag
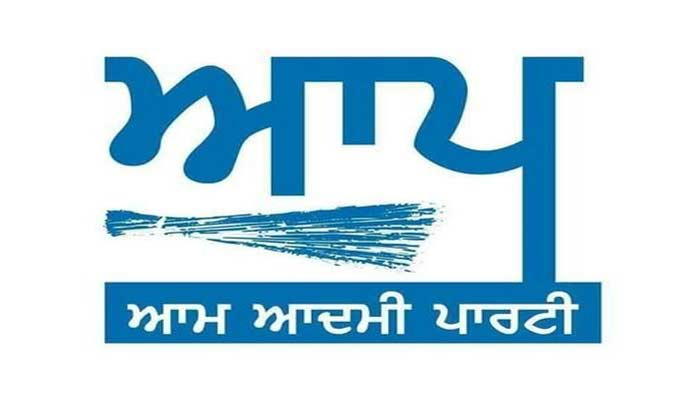

Website
- aamaadmiparty.org

The Aam Aadmi Party (AAP; lit. 'Common Man Party') is a political party in India founded by Arvind Kejriwal and his then-allies on 26 November 2012. The AAP is currently the governing party in the Indian state of Punjab, has representation in both houses of the Parliament of India, and forms the official opposition in Delhi. On 10 April 2023, the AAP was officially granted national party status by the Election Commission of India. Its election symbol is a broom.

The party came into existence following a difference of opinion between Kejriwal and activist Anna Hazare regarding the incorporation of electoral politics into the popular 2011 Indian anti-corruption movement, which had been demanding a Jan Lokpal Bill since 2011. Hazare preferred the movement should remain politically unaligned, whereas Kejriwal felt the failure of the agitation route necessitated changes in the government's representation itself.

Making its electoral debut in the 2013 Delhi Legislative Assembly election, the AAP emerged as the second-largest party. It formed the government with support from members of the Indian National Congress (INC) in the assembly; the AAP had previously opposed Manmohan Singh's INC government during the protests. Kejriwal became the Chief Minister of Delhi, but his government resigned 49 days after he could not pass the Jan Lokpal Bill in the assembly, because of the lack of support from the INC. After the President's rule in Delhi, in the following 2015 elections, the AAP won 67 of the 70 seats in the assembly and Kejriwal was again sworn in as the Chief Minister of Delhi On 3 December 2015, the Jan Lokpal Bill was passed by the AAP government with a majority in the Delhi Legislative Assembly. In the subsequent 2020 Delhi Legislative Assembly election, AAP was re-elected as the governing party after winning 62 seats out of 70. The party suffered a sharp decline in the 2025 Delhi Legislative Assembly election, winning only 22 seats. It ultimately lost power to the Bharatiya Janata Party (BJP), which obtained an absolute majority; Kejriwal and several other notable leaders lost their seats.

Outside Delhi, the AAP cemented its popularity when it emerged as the principal opposition party in the 2017 Punjab Legislative Assembly election after securing 20 seats. In the subsequent 2022 Punjab Legislative Assembly election, AAP was elected as the main governing party after winning 92 seats. Following this, Bhagwant Mann was sworn in as the Chief Minister of Punjab. The party currently also has representation in Goa, Jammu and Kashmir, and Gujarat. The APP was formerly a member of the Indian National Developmental Inclusive Alliance until its withdrawal in 2025.

== History ==
The party's former logo

=== Formation ===
In the years immediately preceding the 2011 anti-corruption protests under the erstwhile Second Manmohan Singh ministry led by UPA , there were examples of alleged corruption in the country; these included the Adarsh Housing Society Scam, the 2010 housing loan scam, the Radia tapes controversy, and the 2G spectrum case. Massive anti-corruption protests and strikes were initiated by Anna Hazare in 2011 as a response to exposure of these financial scams and corruption. The aim was to press the government to enact a strong and effective Lokpal (Federal Ombudsman) through a Jan Lokpal Bill. Hazare was supported by a clutch of activists and professionals which became popularly known as Team Anna. Team Anna also included a civil-servant turned activist Arvind Kejriwal. Hazare had wanted to keep the movement politically neutral but Kejriwal considered that direct involvement in politics was necessary because attempts to obtain progress regarding the Jan Lokpal Bill through talks with existing political parties had, in his opinion, achieved nothing. A survey conducted on a Facebook page that purported to be operated by India Against Corruption and other social networking services had indicated that there was wide support for politicisation. Hazare rejected the poll, saying "elections require huge funds, which will be tough for activists to organise without compromising on their values". He also said it would be difficult to ensure that candidates are not corrupted once elected. Hazare and Kejriwal agreed on 19 September 2012 that their differences regarding a role in politics were irreconcilable. Kejriwal had support from some anti-corruption movement activists, such as Prashant Bhushan and Shanti Bhushan, but was opposed by others such as Kiran Bedi and Santosh Hegde. On 2 October, Kejriwal announced that he was forming a political party and that he intended the formal launch to be on 26 November, coinciding with the anniversary of India's adoption of its Constitution in 1949.

The party's name reflects the phrase Aam Aadmi (transl. common man), whose interests Kejriwal proposed to represent. A party constitution was adopted on 24 November 2012, when a National Council comprising 320 people and a National Executive of 23 were also formed. Both the Council and the Executive were expected to have more members in due course, with the intention being that all districts and all classes of people would have a voice. Various committees were proposed to be formed to draft proposals for adoption by the party in a process that was expected to take several months. Although one aim was to limit nepotism, there were complaints at this initial meeting that the selection of people invited to attend was itself an example of such practices. The party was formally launched in Delhi on 26 November and in March 2013, it was registered as a political party by the Election Commission of India. (Note: The Election Commission of India gazetted the AAP as a "registered unrecognised party" on 9 April 2013.)

On 26 November 2012, the formal launch day of the AAP, former law minister Shanti Bhushan donated ₹10 million (US$110,000) to the party. Prashant Bhushan, his son, was a member of the party's National Executive Committee. The party raised ₹20 crore (US$2.1 million) by November 2013 and received ₹18 crore (US$1.9 million) in 2015 assembly polls.

On 18 May 2013, a group of Indian Americans from 20 different cities in the US held a convention in Chicago and extended support to the AAP. The convention was attended by two AAP leaders, Kumar Vishwas and Yogendra Yadav, and Kejriwal addressed it via video conferencing. Aruna Roy and Medha Patkar, who had differences with Kejriwal on certain issues, supported him after his 15-day fast against inflated electricity bills. On 22 March 2014, the Janata Dal (Secular) party of Delhi announced it would merge with the Aam Aadmi Party, citing Kejriwal's tenure as Chief Minister of Delhi. Later two of the founders of the party, Prashant Bhushan and Yogendra Yadav, left the Aam Aadmi Party in 2017 and formed Swaraj Abhiyan.

On 23 March 2013, Kejriwal began an indefinite fast in an attempt to mobilise people against inflated power and electricity bills at a house in Sundar Nagri, a low-income group resettlement colony in North-East Delhi. During the protest, he urged Delhi citizens not to pay "inflated" water and electricity bills. The AAP also demanded an audit of power and electricity supply in Delhi by the Comptroller and Auditor General of India, something that was also supported by civil society groups like the National Alliance of People's Movement (NAPM). The AAP claimed that the protest gathered support from 100,000 people in Delhi on a single day and more than 300,000 people up to 28 March 2013. Anna Hazare urged Kejriwal to end the fast on 29 March and he did so on 6 April.

On 10 June 2013, Kejriwal supported agitation by Delhi auto rickshaw drivers, who were protesting the Delhi government's ban on advertisements on auto rickshaws. Kejriwal claimed the government's ban was because the drivers supported his party and carried AAP's advertisements on their vehicles. He said that the AAP would put 10,000 advertisements on auto rickshaws as a protest. In retrospect, after Kejriwal had been elected and then resigned his position, a union representing the drivers expressed dissatisfaction, saying: "Arvind Kejriwal, who had won the elections because of the support of the auto drivers, has betrayed them by not fulfilling any of the promises made before the elections". On 22 April 2015, the AAP organised a rally in Delhi against a land acquisition bill.

=== In Delhi ===
==== 2013 ====
The 2013 Delhi state assembly elections were the party's first electoral contest. The Election Commission approved the symbol of a broom for use by the AAP in that campaign. The party said that its candidates were honest and had been screened for potential criminal backgrounds. It published its central manifesto on 20 November 2013, promising to implement the Jan Lokpal Bill within 15 days of coming to power.

In November 2013, a sting operation conducted by Media Sarkar alleged that several leaders of the AAP, including Kumar Vishwas and Shazia Ilmi, had agreed to extend their support to some people seeking assistance with land deals and other financial arrangements in return for donations in cash to the AAP. Ilmi offered to withdraw her candidature as a result, but the party refused to accept her offer, describing the footage as fabricated and a violation of the Model Code of Conduct. The Election Commission ordered an inquiry regarding the legitimacy of the video where the political leaders have raised funding through "illegal" means. However immediately after the general elections, Shazia Ilmi (PAC member) resigned from the party.

The AAP emerged as the second-largest party in Delhi, winning 28 of the 70 Assembly seats; the Bharatiya Janata Party, as the largest party, won 31, while its ally Shiromani Akali Dal, won 1; Indian National Congress won 8, and two were won by others. On 28 December 2013, the AAP formed a minority government in the hung Assembly, with what Sheila Dikshit describes as "not unconditional" support from Indian National Congress. Kejriwal became the second-youngest Chief Minister of Delhi. As a result of the Delhi elections, the AAP became a recognised state party in Delhi.

Vote share of different parties in the 2015 Delhi election:
1. Aam Aadmi Party (53.4%)
2. BJP (32.2%)
3. INC (9.70%)
4. BSP (1.30%)
5. INLD (0.60%)
6. Independents (0.50%)
7. SAD (0.50%)
8. NOTA (0.40%)
9. Other (1.40%)

==== 2015 ====
The Delhi state assembly elections for the Sixth Legislative Assembly of Delhi were held on 7 February 2015, as declared by the Election Commission of India. The Aam Aadmi Party scored a landslide victory by winning a majority of 67 of the 70 seats. The BJP was able to win 3 seats and the Congress party saw all its candidates lose. Kejriwal became the Chief Minister for the second time. The AAP had started campaigning in Delhi in November 2014 and declared candidates for all 70 seats.

During the campaign, Kejriwal claimed that the BJP had been trying to bribe AAP volunteers. He asked Delhi voters to not deny the bribes offered to them. He suggested that voters should accept the bribe from others and yet vote for AAP through the secret ballot in the election. The situation caused the Election Commission of India to instruct Kejriwal to desist from breaking laws governing the model code of conduct for elections in India, but the Delhi court then allowed Kejriwal to challenge this.

The President's Rule was subsequently rescinded and Kejriwal became the Chief Minister of Delhi with six cabinet ministers (Manish Sisodia, Asim Ahmed Khan, Sandeep Kumar, Satyendar Jain, Gopal Rai, and Jitender Singh Tomar).

Major differences surfaced within the party leadership soon after its victory. It created deep fissures between the founding members who had together championed the anti-corruption movement. Problems emerged in February 2015 when Yogendra Yadav and Prashanth Bhushan wrote a joint letter to the National Executive, highlighting Kejriwal's tendency to unilateral decision-making, which they alleged had compromised the party's core principle of Swaraj. After continued allegations, counter-allegations and several failed attempts at reconciliation between the two sides, Yadav and Bhushan were first removed from the PAC and later from the National Executive after the party's National Council passed a resolution to expel them for their alleged anti-party activities. Party leaders refuted accusations made by Yadav and Bhushan at the meeting that the party was murdering democracy and resorting to intimidation. In April 2015, Yadav, Bhushan, Anand Kumar, and Ajit Jha were removed from the party.

==== 2020 ====
Vote share of major political parties in Delhi Assembly Election 2020:
1. AAP (53.6%)
2. BJP (38.5%)
3. INC (4.26%)
4. NOTA (0.46%)
5. Others (3.20%)

Voting for the Delhi Assembly elections took place on 8 February 2020, following vehement campaigns run by the major political parties contesting the election. The counting of votes and subsequent announcement of results happened on 11 February.

The Aam Aadmi Party retained the government as the party won 62 out of 70 seats. Arvind Kejriwal became the Chief Minister of Delhi for the third consecutive time. The party's vote share was 53.5%, according to the results.

==== 2025 ====
Vote share by party in 2025 Delhi Legislative assembly election:
1. National Democratic Alliance (47.1%)
2. Aam Aadmi Party (43.6%)
3. Indian National Congress (6.34%)
4. Others (2.37%)
5. NOTA (0.57%)

The incumbent Aam Aadmi Party, which was in power for the previous ten years, lost the election, with several prominent leaders and cabinet ministers including national convener Arvind Kejriwal, Manish Sisodia, Satyendra Kumar Jain, Somnath Bharti, Saurabh Bhardwaj, Rakhi Birla, and Durgesh Pathak losing their seats. AAP managed to win only 22 seats, which was the party's worst performance in Delhi to date. Its vote share plummeted to 43.57%. The BJP formed the government with 48 seats.

=== In Punjab ===
For the 2017 Punjab Legislative Assembly election, the Lok Insaaf Party allied with the AAP. This alliance was called the AAP Alliance and was represented on news channels as AAP+. It won 22 seats in total, two of which were won by the Lok Insaaf Party and the other twenty by the AAP.

The party won a landslide victory in Punjab, defeating the incumbent Congress government of Charanjit Singh Channi, and state party convener Bhagwant Mann was sworn in as the new CM. The party also gained two seats in Goa and five seats in Gujarat.

=== Across India ===
==== State elections ====
For the first time, the AAP contested the 2017 Goa Legislative Assembly election. In Goa, the AAP could not win any seats, and 38 out of 39 candidates failed to save their security deposits.

The AAP contested in 2021 Chandigarh Municipal Corporation election for the first time, won 14 seats and became the single largest party in the council of total 35 elected seats. Sitting mayor Ravi Kant Sharma from BJP lost his seat to AAP candidate Damanpreet Singh. In ward number 21, former mayor and BJP candidate Davesh Moudgil was defeated by AAP's Jasbir.

In January 2021, Arvind Kejriwal announced that AAP would be contesting six state elections in 2022. The six states were Uttar Pradesh, Himachal Pradesh, Goa, Gujarat, Uttarakhand, and Punjab. The party would later win the 2022 Delhi Municipal Corporation election and other municipal elections in Punjab.

In December 2022, the party emerged as the third front in the politics of Gujarat after 2022 Gujarat Legislative Assembly election. It secured 12.92% of the votes polled and five seats in the Assembly. Apart from Gujarat, AAP was also accorded the status of state party in Goa.

In the 2024 Jammu and Kashmir Legislative Assembly election, AAP opened its account in Jammu and Kashmir by the victory of Mehraj Malik from Doda Assembly constituency in the Jammu region by a margin of 4538 votes, making him the union territory's first AAP MLA.

==== National elections ====
The AAP fielded 434 candidates in the 2014 Indian general election, in which it did not expect to do well. It recognised that its support was based primarily in urban areas and that different strategies might be required for different regions of the country. The party pointed out that its funding was limited and that there were too many demands for local visits from Kejriwal. The intention was to field candidates in large numbers to maximise the likelihood of recognition as a national party by the Election Commission. The outcome was that four AAP candidates won, all from Punjab.

Consequently, the AAP became a recognised state party in Punjab. The party obtained 2% of all votes cast nationwide and 414 of its candidates forfeited their deposit by failing to secure one-sixth of the vote in their constituencies. Although the party secured 32.9 per cent of the votes in Delhi, it failed to win any seats there. AAP convenor, Arvind Kejriwal fought from Varanasi against BJP's Prime Ministerial candidate Narendra Modi, but lost by a margin of 371,784 (20.30%) votes and came second ahead of BSP, Congress, SP.

The National Executive member, Yogendra Yadav, in a letter to his party members criticised Kejriwal's style of leadership. After the National Executive meeting on 8 June, the party and Kejriwal acknowledged these differences and announced the launch of "Mission Vistar" (Mission Expand), to include more people in local as well as national decision making.

Unlike the 2014 Indian general election, the Political Affairs Committee (PAC) of the party decided to contest elections on limited seats of some of the states and all the seats in Delhi, Goa, and Punjab. In the state of Haryana, the AAP formed an alliance with Dushyant Chautala's Jannayak Janata Party to contest three Lok Sabha constituencies. The PAC also decided to support and campaign for CPI (M) in Kerala. The party also fielded its first transgender candidate from Allahabad in Uttar Pradesh. The AAP won only 1 constituency of Sangrur. The party later won the Jalandhar Lok Sabha constituency in 2023 after Sushil Kumar Rinku's victory.

The 2024 Indian general election period also coincided with investigations by authorities into state officials belonging to opposition parties, including Delhi Chief Minister Kejriwal, who was under investigation for alleged corruption in the allocation of liquor licences. Following Kejriwal's arrest on 21 March over the liquor licence scam charges, Delhi's finance minister Atishi Marlena Singh accused the BJP of orchestrating a "political conspiracy" against Kejriwal. His arrest also led to clashes between party leaders, supporters and the police on 22 March. Rahul Gandhi, reacting to Kejriwal's arrest, said that a "scared dictator" wants to create a "dead democracy", without naming anyone. After he was released on bail and allowed to vote, Kejriwal urged citizens to "vote against dictatorship". He then returned to prison as part of his bail conditions. Atishi later became CM of Delhi in September 2024 after Kejriwal's resignation. With the Congress-led INDIA Alliance, the AAP won 3 seats in 2024, all in Punjab.

In 2026, Raghav Chadha, AAP's deputy leader in the Rajya Sabha, was removed from the post. He and 7 other AAP MPs later quit the party and joined the BJP.

== Ideology ==
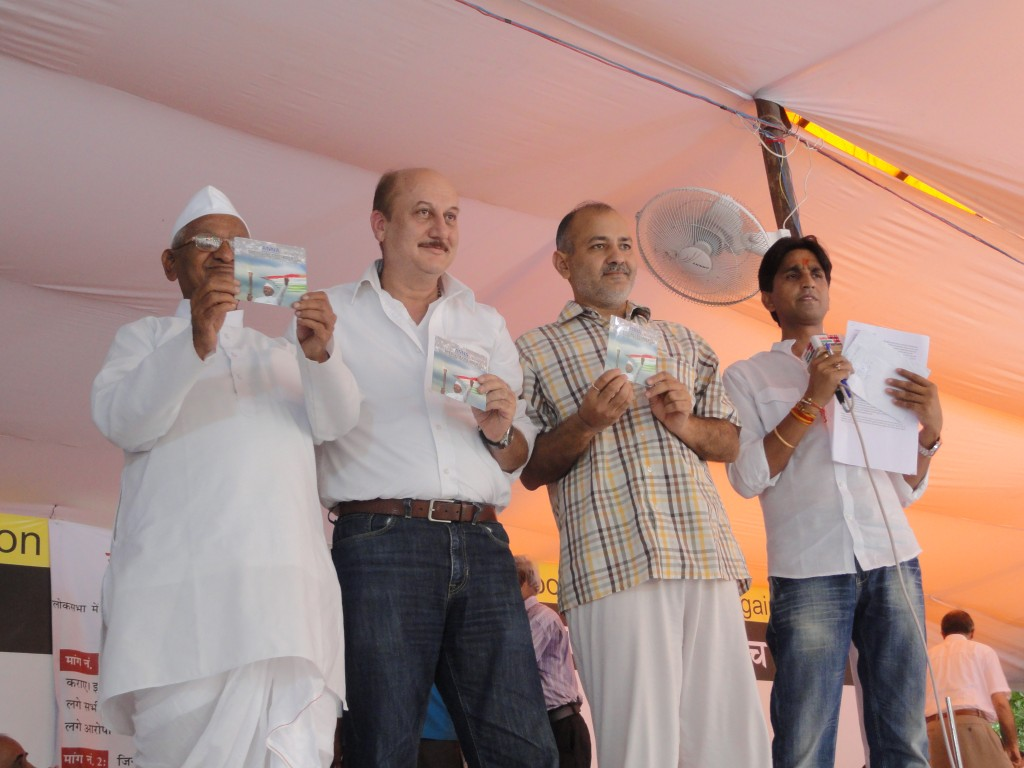
Anna Hazare, Anupam Kher, Manish Sisodia and Kumar Vishwas during the Jan Lokpal Bill movement

Though the party doesn't follow any specific ideology, at the time of its formation, the AAP said that the promise of equality and justice that forms a part of the Constitution of India and of its preamble has not been fulfilled and that the Independence of India has replaced enslavement to an oppressive foreign power with that to a political elite. It claimed that the common people of India remain unheard and unseen except when it suits politicians. The AAP's goal is to reverse the way that government accountability operates, and the party takes an interpretation of the Gandhian socialist concept of swaraj as a tenet. It believes that through swaraj, the government will be directly accountable to the people instead of higher officials. The swaraj model lays stress on self-governance, community building, and decentralisation.

Kejriwal has stated that the AAP refuses to be guided by ideologies and that they are entering politics to change the system, saying, "We are common men. If we find our solution in the left, we are happy to borrow it from there. If we find our solution in the right, we are happy to borrow it from there." Kejriwal has put forward 3 pillars of Aam Aadmi Party's core ideology: staunch patriotism, staunch honesty and humanity.

The party advocates scrapping Section 377 of the Indian Penal Code and legalising both homosexuality and same-sex marriage. The party is also regarded as being populist and centrist.

== Organisation ==
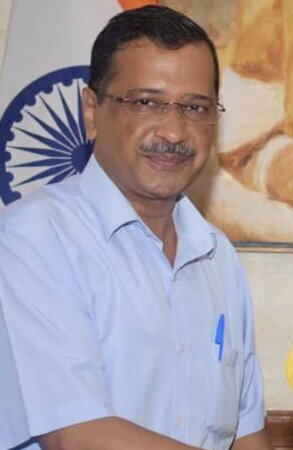
Arvind Kejriwal

The party leadership consists of the following bodies:

- National Convener: Arvind Kejriwal
- National Secretary: Pankaj Gupta
- National Treasurer: Narain Dass Gupta

=== Political Affairs Committee ===
Political Affairs Committee is the highest decision-making body of the party. The current member of the PAC are Arvind Kejriwal, Manish Sisodia, Sanjay Singh, Gopal Rai, Atishi, Imran Hussain, Durgesh Pathak, and Rakhi Bidlan. Pankaj Kr Gupta (National Secretary) and Narain Dass Gupta (National Treasurer) are the ex officio members of the PAC.

=== National Executive Committee ===
The party's National Executive Committee had 34 members in 2022.

=== State leadership ===
The AAP has state wings in Andhra Pradesh, Assam, Bihar, Chandigarh, Chhattisgarh, Delhi, Goa, Gujarat, Haryana, Himachal Pradesh, Jammu and Kashmir, Karnataka, Kerala, Madhya Pradesh, Maharashtra, Manipur, Mizoram, Punjab, Puducherry, Rajasthan, Tamil Nadu, Telangana, Uttar Pradesh, Uttarakhand and West Bengal.

State/UT	State President	State General Secretary	State Incharge	State Co-incharge
Andhra Pradesh	Mani Naidu			
Arunachal Pradesh	Yamra Taya	Toko Nikam	Rajesh Sharma	
Assam	Dr. Bhaben Choudhury		Rajesh Sharma	
Bihar				
Chhattisgarh	Komal Hupendi		Sandeep Pathak	Amolak Singh, Amritpal Singh Sukhanand
Goa	Amit Palekar		Pankaj Gupta	
Gujarat	Isudan Gadhvi		Gopal Rai	
Haryana	Sushil Gupta			
Himachal Pradesh	Surjeet Singh Thakur			
Jharkhand	Dr. Ajay Kumar singh			
Karnataka	Mukhyamantri Chandru			
Kerala	Adv. Vinod Wilson Mathew			
Madhya Pradesh	Rani Agrawal			Rajnish Kumar Dahiya, Jagtar Singh Diyalpura
Maharashtra				
Manipur
Meghalaya
Mizoram	Andrew Lalremkima Pachuau		Rajesh Sharma	
Nagaland	Asu Keyho		Rajesh Sharma	
Odisha	Nishikanta Mohapatra		Sandeep Pathak	
Punjab	Aman Arora			
Rajasthan	Naveen Paliwal		Vinay Mishra	
Sikkim				
Tamil Nadu
Telangana
Tripura
Uttar Pradesh
Uttarkhand	Sawinderjeet Singh Kaler		Dinesh Mohaniya	
West Bengal			Sanjoy Basu	
Andaman and Nicobar Islands				
Chandigarh
Dadra and Nagar Haveli and Daman and Diu
Lakshadweep
Delhi	Saurabh Bhardwaj			
Jammu and Kashmir	Mehraj Malik			
Ladakh				
Puducherry

== Election results ==
=== General election results ===
Election Year	Lok Sabha	Leader	Seats contested	Seats won	+/- seats	Overall Votes	Percentage of votes	+/- Vote	Ref.
2014	16th	Arvind Kejriwal	432	4 / 543	New	11,325,635	2.1%	New	
2019	17th	Arvind Kejriwal	35	1 / 543	▼3	2,716,629	0.4%	▼1.7%	
2024	18th	Arvind Kejriwal	22	3 / 543	▲2	7,147,800	1.11%	▲0.71	

=== State Assembly election results ===
Election Year	Leader	seats contested	seats won	+/- in seats	Overall votes	% of overall votes	+/- in vote share	Sitting side
Assam Legislative Assembly
2026 (debut)	Dr. Bhaben Chaudhary	18	0 / 126	Steady	29,473	0.14	▲0.14	Steady
Bihar Legislative Assembly
2025 (debut)	Rakesh Yadav	83	0 / 243	Steady	150,913	0.30	▲0.30	Steady
Chhattisgarh Legislative Assembly
2018 (debut)		85	0 / 90	Steady	123,525	0.87	▲0.87	Steady
2023	Komal Hupendi	57	0 / 90	Steady	144,710	0.93	▲0.06	Steady
Delhi Legislative Assembly
2013 (debut)	Arvind Kejriwal	69	28 / 70	Steady	2,322,330	29.49	Steady	Government
2015	Arvind Kejriwal	69	67 / 70	▲39	4,838,397	54.3	▲24.8	Government
2020	Arvind Kejriwal	70	62 / 70	▼5	4,974,522	53.57	▼0.73	Government
2025	Arvind Kejriwal	70	22 / 70	▼40	4,133,898	43.57%	▼10.0	Opposition
Goa Legislative Assembly
2017 (debut)		39	0 / 40	Steady	57,420	6.3	Steady	Steady
2022	Amit Palekar	39	2 / 40	▲2	64,354	6.77	▲0.5	Opposition
2027	Valmiki Naik		0 / 40	▲			▲	Opposition
Gujarat Legislative Assembly
2017 (debut)		29	0 / 182	Steady	29,509	0.10	Steady	Steady
2022	Isudan Gadhvi	180	5 / 182	▲5	4,112,055	12.92	▲12.82	Opposition
2027	Isudan Gadhvi		0 / 182	▲			▲	Opposition
Haryana Legislative Assembly
2019 (debut)		46	0 / 90	Steady	59,839	0.48	Steady	Steady
2024	Sushil Gupta	88	0 / 90	Steady	227817	1.79	▲1.31	Steady
Himachal Pradesh Legislative Assembly
2022 (debut)	Surjeet Singh Thakur	67	0 / 68	Steady	46,270	1.10	▲1.10	Steady
2027	Surjeet Singh Thakur		0 / 68	Steady			▲	Steady
Jammu and Kashmir Legislative Assembly
2024 (debut)	Mehraj Malik	7	1 / 90	▲1	29,733	0.52	▲0.52	Opposition
Jharkhand Legislative Assembly
2019 (debut)		26	0 / 81	Steady	35,252	0.23	Steady	Steady
Karnataka Legislative Assembly
2018 (debut)		28	0 / 224	Steady	23,468	0.06	Steady	Steady
2023	Prithvi Reddy	209	0 / 224	Steady	225,869	0.58	▲0.42	Steady
Keralam Legislative Assembly
2026 (debut)	Vinod Mathew Wilson	53	0 / 140	Steady	37,754	0.17	▲0.17	Steady
Madhya Pradesh Legislative Assembly
2018 (debut)	Alok Agrawal	208	0 / 230	Steady	253,106	0.66	Steady	Steady
2023	Rani Agrawal	69	0 / 230	Steady	233,458	0.54	▼0.12	Steady
Maharashtra Legislative Assembly
2019 (debut)		24	0 / 288	Steady	57,855	0.10	Steady	Steady
Meghalaya Legislative Assembly
2018 (debut)		6	0 / 60	Steady	1,410	0.09	Steady	Steady
Mizoram Legislative Assembly
2023 (debut)	Andrew Lalremkima	4	0 / 40	Steady	915	0.09	Steady	Steady
Nagaland Legislative Assembly
2018 (debut)		3	0 / 60	Steady	7,491	0.75	Steady	Steady
Odisha Legislative Assembly
2019 (debut)		15	0 / 147	Steady	14,916	0.06	Steady	Steady
2024	Nishikanta Mohapatra	41	0 / 147	Steady	42,281	0.17	▲0.11	Steady
Punjab Legislative Assembly
2017 (debut)	Gurpreet Ghuggi	112	20 / 117	Steady	3,662,665	23.7	Steady	Opposition
2022	Bhagwant Mann	117	92 / 117	▲72	6,538,783	42.01	▲18.3	Government
2027	Bhagwant Mann		0 / 117	▲			▲	Government
Rajasthan Legislative Assembly
2018 (debut)		142	0 / 200	Steady	136,345	0.38	Steady	Steady
2023	Naveen Paliwal	85	0 / 200	Steady	148,709	0.38	Steady	Steady
Telangana Legislative Assembly
2018 (debut)		41	0 / 119	Steady	13,134	0.06	Steady	Steady
Uttarakhand Legislative Assembly
2022 (debut)	Ajay Kothiyal	70	0 / 70	Steady	178,134	3.31	▲3.31	Steady
2027	TBA		0 / 70	Steady			▲	Steady
Uttar Pradesh Legislative Assembly
2022 (debut)	Sanjay Singh	349	0 / 403	Steady	347,187	0.38	▲0.38	Steady
2027	Sanjay Singh		0 / 403	Steady			▲	Steady

=== Municipal Corporation election results ===
Year	Municipal Corporation	Seats contested	Seats won	Change in seats	Percentage of votes	Vote swing	Ref.
Assam
2022	Guwahati	39	1 / 60	▲1	10.69	Steady	
Chandigarh
2021	Chandigarh	35	14 / 35	▲14	27.08	Steady	
Delhi
2017	North Delhi	104	21 / 104	▲21	27.88	Steady	
2017	South Delhi	104	16 / 104	▲16	26.44	Steady	
2017	East Delhi	64	12 / 64	▲12	23.40	Steady	
2022	Delhi	250	134 / 250	▲85	42.05	▲15.82	
Gujarat
2021	Surat	120	27 / 120	▲27	28.47	Steady	
2021	Gandhinagar	40	1 / 44	▲1	21.77	Steady	
Madhya Pradesh
2022	Singrauli		5 / 45				
Punjab
2018	Amritsar	85	9 / 85	▲9			
2018	Ludhiana	95	1 / 95	▲1			
2021	Batala	51	4 / 51	▲4			
2021	Moga	50	8 / 50	▲8			
2024	Amritsar	85	24 / 85	▲15			
2024	Ludhiana	40	40 / 95	▲39			
2026	Barnala	50	35 / 50	▲35			
2026	Batala	51	30 / 51	▲30			
2026	Mohali	50	35 / 50	▲27			
2026	Bathinda	50	35 / 50	▲35			
2026	Abohar	50	20 / 50	▲20			
2026	Kapurthala	50	11 / 50	▲11			
2026	Moga	50	30 / 50	▲22			
2026	Hoshiarpur	50	35 / 50	▲35			
Uttar Pradesh
2023	Ayodhya	60	1 / 60	▲1			
2023	Firozabad	70	1 / 70	▲1			
2023	Ghaziabad	100	3 / 100	▲3			
2023	Jhansi	60	1 / 60	▲1			
2023	Kanpur	110	1 / 110	▲1			

== List of state/union territorial governments ==
=== Punjab ===
Assembly	Chief Minister	Tenure			Ministry
16th	Bhagwant Mann	16 March 2022	Incumbent	4 years, 247 days	Mann I

=== Delhi ===
Assembly	Chief Minister	Deputy Chief Minister	Tenure			Ministry
5th	Arvind Kejriwal	Vacant	28 December 2013	14 February 2014	48 days	Kejriwal I
6th	Arvind Kejriwal	Manish Sisodia (till 28 February 2023)	14 February 2015	15 February 2020	5 years, 1 day	Kejriwal II
7th	Arvind Kejriwal	Manish Sisodia (till 28 February 2023)	16 February 2020	21 September 2024	4 years, 218 days	Kejriwal III
7th	Arvind Kejriwal	Vacant (since 28 February 2023)	16 February 2020	21 September 2024	4 years, 218 days	Kejriwal III
7th	Atishi	Vacant (since 28 February 2023)	21 September 2024	20 February 2025	152 days	Atishi

== List of Leaders of Opposition ==
=== Leaders of Opposition ===
Year	Sr.no.	Portrait	Name	State Assembly	Term	Duration
2017	15th Leader of the Opposition		Harvinder Singh Phoolka	Punjab	16 March 2017 – 12 October 2018	155 days
2017	16th Leader of the Opposition		Sukhpal Singh Khaira	Punjab	20 July 2017 – 26 July 2018	1 year, 17 days
2017	17th Leader of the Opposition		Harpal Singh Cheema	Punjab	27 July 2018 – 10 March 2022	3 years, 232 days
2025	9th Leader of the Opposition		Atishi Marlena Singh	Delhi	23 February 2025 – present	1 year, 268 days

=== Deputy Leaders of Opposition ===
Year	Sr.no.	Portrait	Name	Constituency	State Assembly	Term	Duration
2017	15th Deputy Leader of the Opposition		Saravjit Kaur Manuke	Jagraon	Punjab	May 2017 – 11 March 2022	5 years
2025	9th Deputy Leader of the Opposition		Mukesh Kumar Ahlawat	Sultanpur Majra	Delhi	23 February 2025-Incumbent	1 year, 268 days

== List of MPs ==
=== Lok Sabha ===
State	Lok sabha	Constituency	Portrait	Name	Election
Punjab	16th	Sangrur		Bhagwant Mann	2014
Punjab	16th	Fatehgarh Sahib (SC)		Harinder Singh Khalsa	2014
Punjab	16th	Faridkot (SC)		Sadhu Singh	2014
Punjab	16th	Patiala		Dharamvir Gandhi	2014
Punjab	17th	Sangrur		Bhagwant Mann	2019
Punjab	17th	Jalandhar		Sushil Kumar Rinku	2023 (by poll) (Note: Joined BJP in 2024)
Punjab	18th	Sangrur		Gurmeet Singh Meet Hayer	2024
Punjab	18th	Hoshiarpur		Raj Kumar Chabbewal	2024
Punjab	18th	Anandpur Sahib		Malvinder Singh Kang	2024

==== Leaders in the Lok Sabha ====
S. No.	Name	Portrait	Term start	Term end	Lok Sabha	Constituency	State
1	Bhagwant Mann		2014	2019	16th	Sangrur	Punjab
1	Bhagwant Mann		2019	2022	17th	Sangrur	Punjab
2	Sushil Kumar Rinku		2023	2024	17th	Jalandhar	Punjab
3	Gurmeet Singh Meet Hayer		2024	Incumbent	18th	Sangrur	Punjab

=== Rajya Sabha ===
State	Name	Portrait	Term start	Term end
Delhi	Sanjay Singh		28 January 2018	27 January 2024
Delhi	Sanjay Singh		28 January 2024	27 January 2030
Delhi	N. D. Gupta		28 January 2018	27 January 2024
Delhi	N. D. Gupta		28 January 2024	27 January 2030
Punjab	Balbir Singh Seechewal		5 July 2022	4 July 2028

==== Leaders in the Rajya Sabha ====
Name	Portrait	Term start	Term end	State	Deputy Leader	State
Sanjay Singh		28 January 2018	Incumbent	Delhi	N. D. Gupta (2018–22); Raghav Chadha (2022–26); Ashok Mittal (2026)	

== See also ==
- AAP Delhi
- AAP Punjab
- Swaraj (book)
- List of political parties in India
