= Jhansi Municipal Corporation =

Local civic body in Jhansi, Uttar Pradesh, India

Jhansi Municipal Corporation Jhansi Nagar Nigam

Type
- Type: Municipal Corporation

Leadership
- Mayor: Bihari Lal Arya, BJP
- Municipal Commissioner: Pulkit Garg, IAS

Structure
- Seats: 60
- Political groups: Government (38): BJP (38); Opposition (22): BSP (7); INC (4); AAP (1); IND (10)

Elections
- Voting system: First past the post
- Last election: 4 May 2023
- Next election: 2028

Meeting place
- Jhansi, Uttar Pradesh

Website
- jnnjhansi.com

Jhansi Municipal Corporation is the municipal corporation responsible for the civic infrastructure and administration of the city of Jhansi. It administers the city's services like public health and parks. The head of the corporation is the mayor. The current mayor is Bihari Lal Arya of the BJP while the municipal commissioner is Pulkit Garg.

The corporation is responsible for public education, correctional institutions, libraries, public safety, recreational facilities, sanitation, water supply, local planning, and welfare services. The mayor and councilors are elected to five-year terms.

In August 2015, Jhansi was selected among 98 cities for the smart city initiative by Government of India.

== See also ==
- List of municipal corporations in India
