= Mridula Jaiswal =

Mayor of Varanasi, Uttar Pradesh

Mayor of Varanasi
- In office December 2017 – May 2022
- Preceded by: Ram Gopal Mohale

Personal details
- Party: Bharatiya Janata Party
- Occupation: Politician
- Known for: Mayor of Varanasi (2017–2022)

Mridula Jaiswal is an Indian politician and the current mayor of Varanasi, Uttar Pradesh.

== Political life ==
Jaiswal is a Bharatiya Janata Party politician. In 2017, she became the mayor of Varanasi, Uttar Pradesh. In the corporation election, she defeated Indian National Congress candidate Shalini Yadav by a margin of 78,843 votes.
