= Ayodhya Municipal Corporation =

Governing civic body of Ayodhya, India

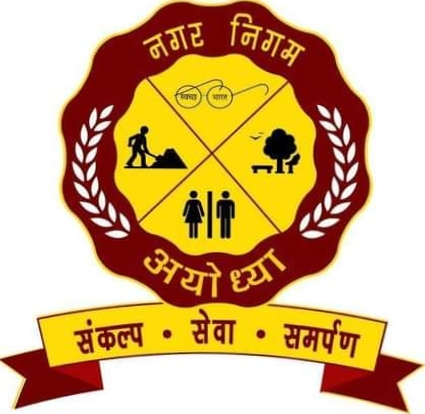
- Seal of the Ayodhya Municipal Corporation

Type
- Type: Municipal Corporation

History
- Founded: 1865 (161 years ago)

Leadership
- Mayor: Girish Pati Tripathi, BJP
- Municipal Commissioner: Jayendra Kumar, IAS

Structure
- Seats: 60
- Political groups: NDA (28): BJP (27); RLD (1); SP (17): SP (17); Others (15): IND (10); BSP (3); AAP (1); PECP (1)
- Length of term: 5 years

Elections
- Voting system: First past the post
- Last election: 11 May 2023
- Next election: 2028

Meeting place
- Ayodhya, Uttar Pradesh

Website
- www.nagarnigamayodhya.in/en

The Ayodhya Municipal Corporation or Ayodhya Nagar Nigam is the governing civic body of the cities of Ayodhya and Faizabad in the Indian state of Uttar Pradesh.

== History ==
Local self-government for Ayodhya and Faizabad was introduced in 1865. The two cities were administered jointly as a municipality. The joint municipality was split on 7 January 1978 into Ayodhya Municipal Council (Nagar Nigam Parishad Ayodhya) and Faizabad Municipal Corporation (Nagar Nigam Faizabad). The Government of Uttar Pradesh made an order in May 2017, merging the two municipal corporations as Ayodhya Municipal Corporation. The governance framework, jurisdiction and function of municipal corporations in Uttar Pradesh (UP) are governed by the UP Municipalities Act 1916, and the UP Municipal Corporations Act 1959. The election for the governing body is conducted by the State Election Commission, which has its office in Faizabad.

The Uttar Pradesh state government established an agency called the Ayodhya-Faizabad Development Authority (AFDA) on 2 November 1985, "to enhance the level of sustainable development of the historic twin cities of Ayodhya and Faizabad." In 2018, the Ayodhya–Faizabad Development Authority approved a proposal to add 2.0 km^{2} (500 acres). The agency is now called the Ayodhya Development Authority (ADA). The Ayodhya Development Authority produced the Ayodhya Master Plan 2031. The first phase of the plan added 133 km^{2} (33,000 acres) and 65 villages. The second phase added 189 villages from Basti and Gonda districts, increasing the area governed by the municipal corporation to 873 km^{2} (216,000 acres), and would be expected to increase the population to 1.4 million by 2031.

== Current members ==
Ayodhya Municipal Corporation has a total of 60 members or corporators, who are directly elected after a term of 5 years. The council is led by the Mayor. The latest elections were held on 11 May 2023. Girish Pati Tripathi of the Bharatiya Janata Party is the current mayor of the city of Ayodhya.

Ward No	Ward Name	Name of Corporator	Party
Mayor: Girish Pati Tripathi
1	Abhiramdas	Sultan Ansari	IND
2	Purushottam Nagar	Gyanmati	SP
3	Jhalkari Bai	Geeta	BJP
4	Darshan Nagar	Gayatri	BJP
5	Avaidyanath	Rajkaran	BJP
6	Shyama Prasad Mukherjee	Vikas Kumar	BJP
7	Chaudhary Charan Singh	Mukesh Kumar	SP
8	Kaushal Puri	Dharma Veer	SP
9	Shivnagar	Shiv Kumar	BJP
10	Lala Lajpat Rai Nagar	Ramtirath	BJP
11	Krishna Nagar	Ramashankar Nishad	BJP
12	Paramhansa Ramchandra Das	Krishna Gopal	SP
13	Acharya Narendra Dev	Anoop Srivastava	BJP
14	Karpuri Thakur	Vikas Kumar	IND
15	Savarkar Nagar	Manish Singh	BJP
16	Maharana Pratap	Abrunnisha	AAP
17	Pt. Deendayal Nagar	Vishwajeet Yadav	BSP
18	Vashishtha Gund	Ranjana Yadav	IND
19	Sitakund	Vinay Kumar Jaiswal	BJP
20	Sant Ravidas Nagar	Deep Kumar	BJP
21	Hanuman Kund	Archana	BJP
22	Sardar Bhagat Singh	Santosh Singh	BJP
23	Sardar Patel Nagar	Indravati	SP
24	Chitragupt Nagar	Manisha Yadav	BJP
25	Atal Nagar	Jaynarayan Singh	BJP
26	Janaura	Dharmendra	BJP
27	Hanumat Nagar	Mohammad Rashid Salim	SP
28	Ashwini Puram	Jagat Narayan Yadav	SP
29	Ashfaq Ullah Khan	Akhilesh Pandey	SP
30	Dashrath Kund	Gyanmati	SP
31	Devkali	Anuj Das	BJP
32	Kabir Nagar	Chandan Singh	BJP
33	Saket Nagar	Kausar	SP
34	Nishadraj Nagar	Gunja Nishad	BSP
35	Ambedkar Nagar	Kafeel Ahmed	IND
36	Awadhpuri	Saurabh Singh Suryavanshi	IND
37	Kalyan Singh	Surya Kumar	RLD
38	Badi Devkali	Sarvjit Kumar	SP
39	Amaniganj	Suman Yadav	BJP
40	Mahatma Gandhi	Farheen Saba	BSP
41	Ram Manohar Lohia	Ram Bhavan	SP
42	Vikramaditya Nagar	Mithlesh Mishra	BJP
43	Shaheed Abdul Hameed	Salman Haider	IND
44	Jay Prakash Narayan	Anil Singh	BJP
45	Ramkot	Chameli Devi	BJP
46	Pateshwari Nagar	Kunti Pandey	IND
47	Jharkhandi	Brijendra	BJP
48	Lakshmi Sagar Nagar	Bakar Ahmed	SP
49	Mangal Pandey	Rajesh Kumar Gaur	BJP
50	Shivaji Nagar	Garima	BJP
51	Ashok Singhal Nagar	Ankit Tripathi	BJP
52	Laxman Ghat	Priya Shukla	SP
53	Chandra Shekhar Nagar	Vishal Pal	SP
54	Agrasen Nagar	Shahnoor Bano	SP
55	Maniramdas Cantonment	Abha Pandey	IND
56	Subhash Chandra Bose	Arjun Yadav	SP
57	Chandragupta Nagar	Mohammad Salim	PECP
58	Nanakpura	Meera	IND
59	Jhule Lal Nagar	Abhinav	IND
60	Swami Vivekananda	Harish Chandra	BJP

== Elections ==
=== 2023 AMC election ===
S.No.	Party name	Party symbol	Number of Corporators
01	Bharatiya Janata Party (BJP)		27
02	Samajwadi Party (SP)		17
03	Bahujan Samaj Party (BSP)		3
04	Rashtriya Lok Dal (RLD)		1
05	Aam Aadmi Party (AAP)		1
06	Peace Party of India (PECP)		1
07	Independents		10

=== 2017 AMC election ===
S.No.	Party name	Party symbol	Number of Corporators
01	Bharatiya Janata Party (BJP)		35
02	Shiv Sena (SHS)		1
03	Indian National Congress (INC)		2
04	Samajwadi Party (SP)		17
05	Bahujan Samaj Party (BSP)		1
06	Independents		4
