= Meerut Municipal Corporation =

Local civic body in Meerut, Uttar Pradesh, India

Meerut Municipal Corporation Meerut Nagar Nigam

Type
- Type: Municipal Corporation

History
- Founded: 31 May 1994

Leadership
- Mayor: Harikant Ahluwalia, BJP
- Municipal Commissioner: Amit Pal, IAS

Structure
- Seats: 90
- Political groups: NDA (42): BJP (42); Opposition (49): SP (13); AIMIM (11); BSP (6); INC (3); RLD (2); ASP(K) (3); IND (10)

Motto
- (Hindi: नगर का विकास, नगर निगम के साथ) (Development of City, With Municipal Corporation)

Meeting place
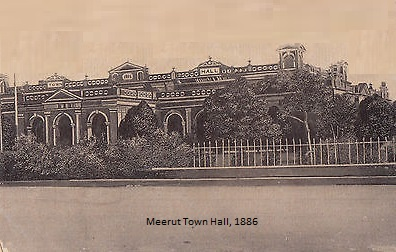
- Town Hall, Jali Kothi, Meerut, Uttar Pradesh

Website
- www.meerutnagarnigam.com/main/default.aspx

The Meerut Nagar Nigam (MNN) also known as Meerut Municipal Corporation (MMC) is the civic body that governs the Meerut city. Established under the Uttar Pradesh Municipal Corporation Act-1959, it is responsible for the civic infrastructure and administration of the city.

The municipal corporation covers an area of 450 km^{2} (170 sq mi). The first mayor of Meerut was Late Mr. Arun Jain from independent and first Deputy Mayor was Late Mr. Mohd. Ashraf Advocate. Since then, the Municipal Body has always been alive in its constitution and functioning to the growing needs of citizens.

Meerut is the second largest city in the National Capital region, and as of 2011 the 33rd most populous urban agglomeration and the 26th most populous city in India. It ranked 292 in 2006 and is projected to rank 242 in 2020 in the list of largest cities and urban areas in the world.

== History ==
Meerut Town Hall was constructed in 1886 while Municipal Board (Nagar Palika) was established in 1892. On 15 June 1982 it was upgraded as Municipal Council (Nagar Mahapalika). On 31 May 1994 after enactment of Uttar Pradesh Municipal Corporation Act 1959, it was further upgraded as Municipal Corporation (Nagar Nigam).

== Objective ==
MMC work for providing necessary community services like health care, educational institution, housing, transport etc. by collecting property tax and fixed grant from the Finance Commission and Government of Uttar Pradesh. Its sources of income are taxes on water, houses, markets, entertainment and vehicles paid by residents of the town and grants from the state government. Its annual budget in 2017–18 was ₹4812.2 million.

=== Amendment ===
The 73rd and 74th Constitutional Amendments were introduced in 1992 and were meant to facilitate greater decentralization at the rural and urban level respectively. They did so through providing legal status to local assemblies and entrusting them with greater functions and powers. The inclusion of certain social categories that had historically been marginalized from policy making and implementing structures was fundamental to the project of decentralization. These social categories were the Scheduled Castes, Scheduled Tribes and women. While the 73rd Amendment applies to the Panchayati Raj system, the 74th Amendment applies to Municipal Corporations, Municipal Councils and Nagar Panchayats depending on the size of the city. The 74th Amendment states:

"Not less than one – third (including the number of seats reserved for women belonging to the Scheduled Castes and Scheduled Tribes) of the total number of seats to be filled by direct election in every Municipality shall be reserved for women and such seats may be allotted by rotation to different constituencies in a Municipality.

=== Functions ===
The Twelfth Schedule to the Constitution lists the subjects that Meerut Municipal Corporation is responsible for. The Corporation is entrusted to perform functions and implement schemes including those in relation to the matters listed in the Twelfth Schedule.

== Legislative Branch ==
Mayor is elected to serve as the de jure head of the municipal corporation. He is the head of the house (Meerut Town Hall) and belong to the party which is in majority. The office of the Mayor has ceremonial role associated with being the First Citizen of the city.

In every five years an election is held to elect corporators to power. The corporators are responsible for overseeing that their constituencies have the basic civic infrastructure in place, and that there is no lacuna on the part of the authorities. Position of Mayor is currently reserved for woman from Scheduled Caste category. Mrs. Sunita Verma from BSP is the incumbent Mayor of the city. Her husband Mr. Yogesh Verma is former MLA from Hastinapur.

=== Wards ===
As of 2017, the Meerut Municipal Corporation's legislature, also known as the Corporation Council, consists of 90 directly elected corporators while additional 10 corporators are nominated by state government. Out of 90 directly elected corporators; 35 seats are unreserved, 17 seats are reserved for women coming from any category, 16 seats are reserved for people belong to Other Backward Class category, 7 seats are reserved for women from Other Backward Class category, 10 seats are reserved for people belong to Scheduled Caste category and 5 seats are reserved for women from Scheduled Caste category.

List of wards in MMC in 2017 election
S.No.	Name of Ward	Name of Corporator	Political Party
1	Nai Basti Lallapura	Tulsavati	BSP
2	Maliyana	Kamla Devi	BSP
3	Bhagwatpura	Raj Kumar Singh	BSP
4	Shergarhi	Suman	BJP
5	Shivlokpuri	Sumit	BSP
6	Mohakampur	Jyoti	BJP
7	Pilna Sofipur	Mahendra Singh Bharti	BJP
8	Lisari	Dharamvir Singh	BSP
9	Kasampur	Priya Shakya	BJP
10	Kashi	Vishal Chaudhary	RLD
11	Shivpuram	Rajkumari Chandna	BSP
12	Shobhapur	Surendra Kumar	BSP
13	Jai Bheem Nagar	Ajay	BJP
14	Jagriti Vihar Sector-8	Sameer Singh	BJP
15	Multan Nagar	Kuldeep Singh	BSP
16	Ajanta Colony	Priya	BSP
17	Abdullahpur	Shaukat Ali	BJP
18	Sarai Qazi	Ravindra Kumar	BSP
19	Dayampur	Ashutosh Malik	BJP
20	Kaseru Khera	Vijay Sonkar	BJP
21	Tulsi Colony	Parmanand	BSP
22	Golabarh	Dimpy Alias Dimple	BJP
23	Subhashpuri	Rajesh Khanna	Independent
24	Kaseru Baxur	Savita	BSP
25	Anoopnagar Fazalpur	Rangeeta	Independent
26	Tejgarhi	Sunita Rani	BJP
27	Pallavpuram Phase-1	Pradeep	BSP
28	Rithani	Saroj	BSP
29	Subhash Nagar	Pawan Chaudhary	Independent
30	Modipuram	Lokesh	BJP
31	Shatabdi Nagar	Himanshi	Independent
32	Civil Lines	Lalit Nagdev	BJP
33	Qazipur	Sitara Begum	BSP
34	Shiv Shakti Nagar	Neelam Sharma	BJP
35	Hafizabad Mewla	Poonam Gupta	BJP
36	Jahidpur	Shaukat Ali	BSP
37	Ganganagar	Gulveer Singh	BJP
38	Khadoli	Renu	BJP
39	Brahmapuri West	Rajeev	BJP
40	Jatoli	Munish Kumar	BJP
41	Nagala Tashi	Maheshpal Singh	BSP
42	Jain Nagar	Beena	BJP
43	Brahmapuri East	Ranjan	INC
44	Mohanpuri	Prasanjeet	Independent
45	Jagriti Vihar Sector-3	Sachin Tyagi	BJP
46	Yadgar Nagar	Swati	BJP
47	Shah Peer Gate	Mobin Khan	Independent
48	Madhavpuram	Shikha	Independent
49	Purwa Mahaveer	Kashim	BSP
50	Nagala Battu	Sanjay Singh	BJP
51	Sabun Godown	Deepika Gupta	BJP
52	Bhopal Singh Road	Manmohan Johri	BJP
53	Shastri Nagar Sector-3	Nidhi	BJP
54	Purwa Illahi Baqsh	Shehzad	Independent
55	Fatehullahpur	Asgari	BSP
56	Prahlad Nagar	Jitendra	BJP
57	Pallavpuram Phase-2	Vikrant Dhaka	BJP
58	Surajkund Road	Anshul Gupta	BJP
59	Jaidevi Nagar	Kishan Kumar	BJP
60	Phool Bagh Colony	Neeraj	Independent
61	Shastri Nagar L-2	Rajesh	BJP
62	Indra Nagar	Vipin Jindal	BJP
63	L-Block Shastri Nagar	Anuj Vashisht	BJP
64	North Patel Nagar (Thapar Nagar)	Sunita	BJP
65	Khair Nagar	Saudi Faizi	Independent
66	Sarai Behleem	Salma Malik	BSP
67	Kailashpuri	Rakesh Kumar	BJP
68	Maqbara Diggi	Mohd. Akram	Independent
69	Sarai Laal Das	Pankaj Goyal	BJP
70	Ismail Nagar	Mohd. Iqram	INC
71	South Islamabad	Mohd. Asif	Independent
72	East Islamabad	Aisaan Ansari	Independent
73	Manzoor Nagar	Abdul Gaffar	BSP
74	Purwa Faiyaz Ali	Irfaan	Independent
75	Shahjahan Colony	Jahara	BSP
76	Shyam Nagar West	Dilshad	BSP
77	Lakhipura	Zaibunisha	SP
78	Swamipara	Sandeep	BJP
79	Kidwai Nagar	Mohd. Rashid	SP
80	Kareem Nagar	Zubair	AIMIM
81	Tarapuri	Mohd. Shehzad	Independent
82	Fakruddin Ali Ahmad Nagar East	Saed Akhtar	BSP
83	Fakruddin Ali Ahmad Nagar West-1	Qaiyum Ansari	Independent
84	Fakruddin Ali Ahmad Nagar West-2	Aas Mohd.	Independent
85	Zakir Hussain Colony	Shabbir	BSP
86	Zakir Hussain Colony North	Iqramuddin	SP
87	Zakir Hussain Colony South	Zareena	BSP
88	Shyam Nagar East	Shabara	BSP
89	Rashid Nagar	Nazreen	SP
90	Feroz Nagar	Shaqeela	BSP

=== Vande Mataram row ===
Following the crackdown on slaughterhouses and the harassment unleashed by the anti-Romeo squad, the Mayor of Meerut told Municipal Commissioner to act to those who refused to sing Vande Mataram at the beginning of the Nagar Nigam board meeting in the city. Mayor Harikant Ahluwalia allegedly did not let seven corporators take part in a meeting after they refused to participate in the singing of the national song. He has also allegedly declared that anyone who does not comply with this rule will not be allowed to cross the threshold of the board room or join meetings. The decision has enraged some members of the council, which has around 80 members, for its undemocratic overtone.

The situation came to a boiling point when some members, mostly Muslims, were leaving the room before the recital of the national song commenced. They were informed by some BJP members that "Hindustan mein rehna hai to Vande Mataram kehna hoga (If you want to live in India, you have to sing Vande Mataram)." To placate the enraged majority, the mayor was allegedly forced to pass a resolution through voice votes to make the singing of the national song mandatory at the council.

== Executive Branch ==
The Meerut Municipal Corporation is administratively headed by Municipal Commissioner, who is the de facto head of the municipal corporation, the form of government which is granted to a city of over one million in population. He is an IAS Or PCS officer appointed by the state government to head the staff of the Municipal Corporation, vested with all executive powers of Municipal Corporation and implement the decisions of the Corporation and prepare its annual budget. Municipal Commissioner is assisted by two Additional Municipal Commissioners and one Joint Municipal Commissioner at headquarters located near Ghanta Ghar, Kaiser Ganj Road, Meerut. All departmental heads reports to Municipal Commissioner.

=== Zones ===
Meerut Municipal Corporation is divided into three zones each head either by a Deputy Municipal Commissioner or by an Assistant Municipal Commissioner. The Municipal Corporation is divided into 90 wards, which is managed through 4 zones.

The three Zones are :-

1. Headquarters
2. Shastri Nagar
3. Kanker Khera

=== Finance and Accounts Department ===
Finance and Accounts Department is headed by Chief Finance Officer (CFO). There is one Account Officer and Assistant Account Officer in the department.

=== Health Department ===
Health Department is headed by City Health Officer (CHO). There are many Additional City Health Officers, Veterinary Doctors, Zonal Health Officers etc.

=== Engineering Department ===
Engineering Department is headed by Chief Engineer (CE) who is assisted by three Executive Engineers, one Assistant Engineer and eight Junior Engineers. Department also has many supervisors, clerks, mates and peons.

=== Water Works Department ===
This department is headed by Senior Engineer (SE). Two Executive Engineers, one Assistant Engineer and one supervisor usually manages water related problems in the city.

=== Sanitation Department ===
Sanitation Department is headed by Chief Sanitary Inspector (CSI) who is assisted by many Sanitary Inspectors, Safai Nayak, sweepers.

=== Street Lighting Department ===
This department is headed by Inspector, Street Lighting (ISL). Solar Lights, LED lights are used in major parts of the city.

=== Taxation Department ===
Taxation Department is headed by Chief Tax Assessment Officer (CTAO). There are two Tax Assessment Officer and four Tax Superintendents in the department. Department also has many Assistant Tax Superintendents, Revenue Inspectors, clerks and peons.

== See also ==
- Meerut division
- Meerut district
- Meerut (Lok Sabha constituency)
- Meerut (Assembly constituency)
- Meerut Cantt. (Assembly constituency)
- Meerut South (Assembly constituency)
