= List of constituencies of the Arunachal Pradesh Legislative Assembly =

Arunachal Pradesh Legislative Assembly
- 11th Arunachal Pradesh Assembly

Type
- Type: Unicameral
- Term limits: 5 years
- Seats: 60

Elections
- Voting system: First past the post
- Last election: 2024

Meeting place
- Vidhan Bhavan, Itanagar, Arunachal Pradesh

Website
- https://arla.neva.gov.in/

Location of Arunachal Pradesh (in red) within India

The Arunachal Pradesh Legislative Assembly is the unicameral legislature of the state of Arunachal Pradesh in northeast India. Its seat is at Itanagar, the capital of the state, and it sits for a term of five years unless it is dissolved early. (Note: A Legislative Assembly can be dissolved early, under Article 174 of the Indian Constitution, in a few situations, including a hung assembly and the inability of any alliance to form a majority.) Arunachal Pradesh is India's third smallest state by population and the fifteenth smallest by area. The Arunachal Pradesh Legislative Assembly has had 11 terms since its creation. After the latest election in 2024, the assembly is governed by the Bharatiya Janata Party, which has 43 out of the 60 seats. The Janata Dal, the largest opposition party, has 6 seats.

Constituency boundaries are periodically redrawn by the delimitation commission, which tries to keep them as geographically compact areas, and with due consideration to existing boundaries of administrative units. The latest census is used to draw the boundaries and every assembly constituency has to be completely within a parliamentary constituency. Since 1987, the Arunachal Pradesh Assembly has had 60 single-seat constituencies, each of which directly elects a representative based on a first past the post election.

Since the independence of India from the United Kingdom in 1947, the Scheduled Castes (SC) and Scheduled Tribes (ST) have been given reservation status, guaranteeing political representation, and the Constitution lays down the general principles of positive discrimination for SCs and STs. According to the 2011 census of India the Scheduled Tribes constitute 68.8% of the population of the state, while there were no people of any Scheduled caste. The Scheduled Tribes have been granted a reservation of 59 seats in the assembly, while the only remaining seat (Bordumsa-Diyun) is unreserved.

== History ==
Changes in the constituencies of the Arunachal Pradesh Legislative Assembly over time
| Year | Act/Order | Explanation | Total seats | ST-reserved seats | Election(s) |
|---|---|---|---|---|---|
| 1971 | North-Eastern Areas (Reorganisation) Act, 1971 | The North-East Frontier Agency, a region of Assam, was converted into a separate union territory. | 30 | 2 | 1978, 1980, 1984 |
| 1987 | State of Arunachal Pradesh Act | Arunachal Pradesh was converted from a union territory to a state. The number of seats in its assembly was increased to 60. | 60 | 59 | 1990, 1995, 1999, 2004 |
| 2008 | Delimitation Commission Order, 2008 | There were changes in the areas covered by constituencies. | 60 | 59 | 2009, 2014, 2019, 2024 |

== Constituencies ==
Assembly constituencies of Arunachal Pradesh

Reservation
Scheduled Tribes (ST)

Constituencies of the Arunachal Pradesh Legislative Assembly
| No. | Name | Reservation | District | Lok Sabha constituency | Electorate (2024) |
|---|---|---|---|---|---|
| 1 | Lumla | ST | Tawang | Arunachal West | 9,917 |
| 2 | Tawang | ST | Tawang | Arunachal West | 10,649 |
| 3 | Mukto | ST | Tawang | Arunachal West | 7,995 |
| 4 | Dirang | ST | West Kameng | Arunachal West | 15,262 |
| 5 | Kalaktang | ST | West Kameng | Arunachal West | 10,992 |
| 6 | Thrizino-Buragaon | ST | West Kameng | Arunachal West | 14,717 |
| 7 | Bomdila | ST | West Kameng | Arunachal West | 10,840 |
| 8 | Bameng | ST | Bichom | Arunachal West | 13,960 |
| 9 | Chayangtajo | ST | East Kameng | Arunachal West | 13,873 |
| 10 | Seppa East | ST | East Kameng | Arunachal West | 12,461 |
| 11 | Seppa West | ST | East Kameng | Arunachal West | 8,408 |
| 12 | Pakke-Kessang | ST | Pakke-Kessang | Arunachal West | 9,297 |
| 13 | Itanagar | ST | Papum Pare | Arunachal West | 63,995 |
| 14 | Doimukh | ST | Papum Pare | Arunachal West | 25,369 |
| 15 | Sagalee | ST | Papum Pare | Arunachal West | 14,625 |
| 16 | Yachuli | ST | Keyi Panyor | Arunachal West | 17,521 |
| 17 | Ziro–Hapoli | ST | Lower Subansiri | Arunachal West | 25,285 |
| 18 | Palin | ST | Kra-Daadi | Arunachal West | 17,368 |
| 19 | Nyapin | ST | Kurung Kumey | Arunachal West | 16,464 |
| 20 | Tali | ST | Kra-Daadi | Arunachal West | 14,564 |
| 21 | Koloriang | ST | Kurung Kumey | Arunachal West | 14,546 |
| 22 | Nacho | ST | Upper Subansiri | Arunachal West | 12,385 |
| 23 | Taliha | ST | Upper Subansiri | Arunachal West | 11,397 |
| 24 | Daporijo | ST | Upper Subansiri | Arunachal West | 17,044 |
| 25 | Raga | ST | Kamle | Arunachal West | 16,938 |
| 26 | Dumporijo | ST | Upper Subansiri | Arunachal West | 12,912 |
| 27 | Liromoba | ST | West Siang | Arunachal West | 14,004 |
| 28 | Likabali | ST | Lower Siang | Arunachal West | 12,398 |
| 29 | Basar | ST | Lepa Rada | Arunachal West | 19,208 |
| 30 | Along West | ST | West Siang | Arunachal West | 14,811 |
| 31 | Along East | ST | West Siang | Arunachal West | 14,490 |
| 32 | Rumgong | ST | Siang | Arunachal West | 12,689 |
| 33 | Mechuka | ST | Shi Yomi | Arunachal West | 11,000 |
| 34 | Tuting–Yingkiong | ST | Upper Siang | Arunachal East | 13,169 |
| 35 | Pangin | ST | Siang | Arunachal East | 14,239 |
| 36 | Nari-Koyu | ST | Lower Siang | Arunachal East | 8,220 |
| 37 | Pasighat West | ST | East Siang | Arunachal East | 14,637 |
| 38 | Pasighat East | ST | East Siang | Arunachal East | 21,899 |
| 39 | Mebo | ST | East Siang | Arunachal East | 12,410 |
| 40 | Mariyang-Geku | ST | Upper Siang | Arunachal East | 12,212 |
| 41 | Anini | ST | Dibang Valley | Arunachal East | 4,747 |
| 42 | Dambuk | ST | Lower Dibang Valley | Arunachal East | 13,012 |
| 43 | Roing | ST | Lower Dibang Valley | Arunachal East | 11,815 |
| 44 | Tezu | ST | Lohit | Arunachal East | 20,761 |
| 45 | Hayuliang | ST | Anjaw | Arunachal East | 13,160 |
| 46 | Chowkham | ST | Namsai | Arunachal East | 14,338 |
| 47 | Namsai | ST | Namsai | Arunachal East | 24,554 |
| 48 | Lekang | ST | Namsai | Arunachal East | 20,864 |
| 49 | Bordumsa-Diyun | None | Changlang | Arunachal East | 22,943 |
| 50 | Miao | ST | Changlang | Arunachal East | 22,296 |
| 51 | Nampong | ST | Changlang | Arunachal East | 9,710 |
| 52 | Changlang South | ST | Changlang | Arunachal East | 6,365 |
| 53 | Changlang North | ST | Changlang | Arunachal East | 10,341 |
| 54 | Namsang | ST | Tirap | Arunachal East | 9,491 |
| 55 | Khonsa East | ST | Tirap | Arunachal East | 10,142 |
| 56 | Khonsa West | ST | Tirap | Arunachal East | 11,737 |
| 57 | Borduria–Bagapani | ST | Tirap | Arunachal East | 9,101 |
| 58 | Kanubari | ST | Longding | Arunachal East | 12,480 |
| 59 | Longding–Pumao | ST | Longding | Arunachal East | 14,607 |
| 60 | Pongchau-Wakka | ST | Longding | Arunachal East | 16,060 |

== See also ==
- List of constituencies of the Assam Legislative Assembly
- List of constituencies of the Nagaland Legislative Assembly
