= Wangnam Wangshu =

Wangnam Wangshu (1950-2010/2011) was an Indian politician. He was born in 1950 in Chopnu village of Tirap District, the son of Wangdun Wangshu. He studied at J.N. College in Pasighat, and became a sergeant in the Senior NCC Unit. He became involved in socio-political issues as a student. He was elected to the first Arunachal Pradesh Legislative Assembly in the 1978 election, standing as the Janata Party candidate in the Pongchau-Wakka constituency. He obtained 1,344 votes (59.63%).

In the 1980 Arunachal Pradesh Legislative Assembly election, he was elected unopposed from the Niausa–Kanubari constituency, standing as a People's Party of Arunachal candidate. He later joined the Indian National Congress. In the subsequent 1984 Arunachal Pradesh Legislative Assembly election, the Niausa-Kanubari seat was not uncontested, on the contrary it had the highest number (ten) of candidates in the fray. Wangnam Wangshu, standing as an independent finished in fourth place with 497 votes (8.64%).

Wangnam Wangshu lived in Longding, Tirap District. His interests included hunting, fishing, reading and sports like football and volleyball. He died in the early 2010s.
