= 2004 Arunachal Pradesh Legislative Assembly election =

Arunachal Pradesh Assembly Election, 2004
- 7 October 2004

All 60 seats in the Arunachal Pradesh Legislative Assembly 31 seats needed for a majority
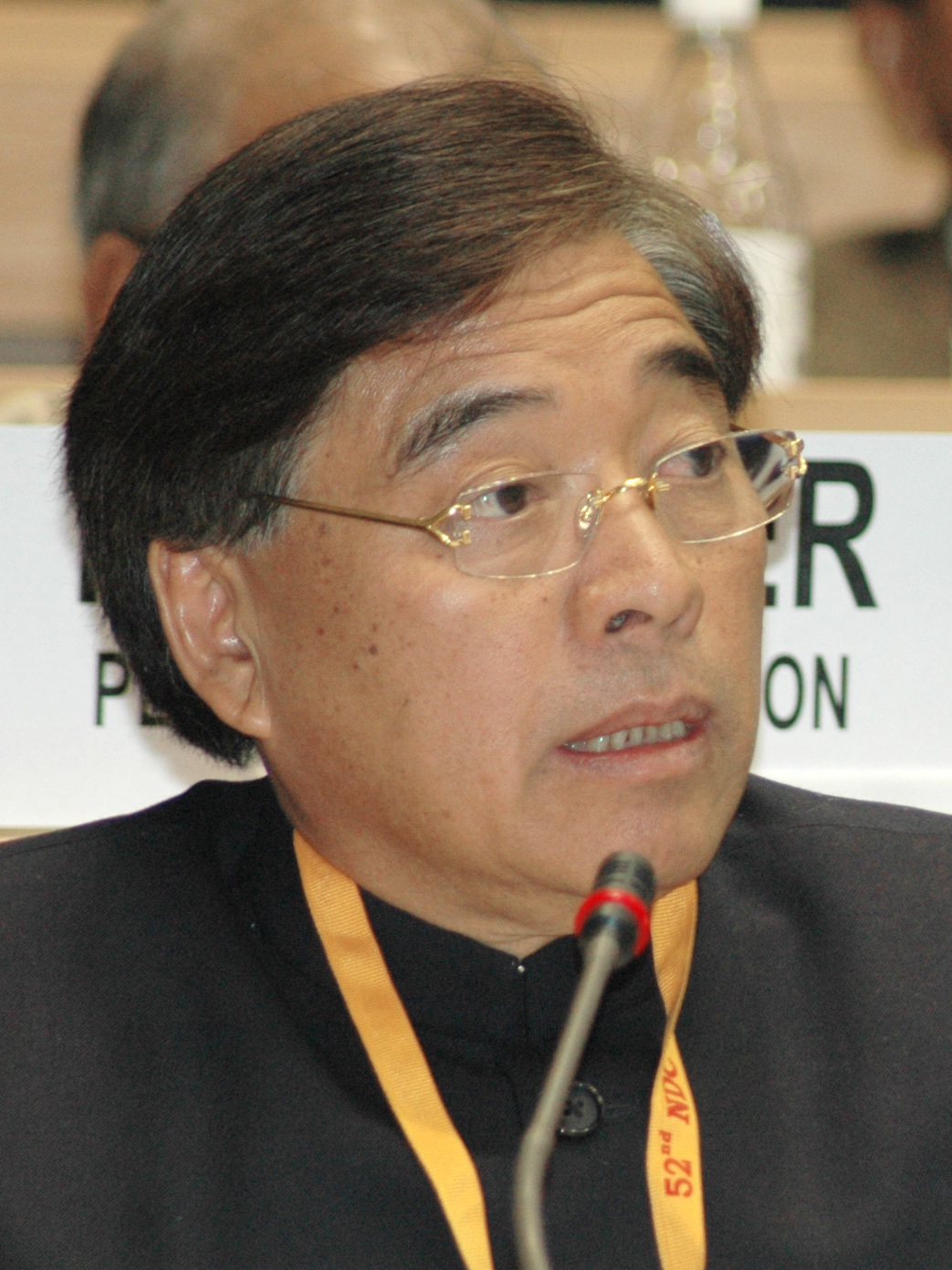

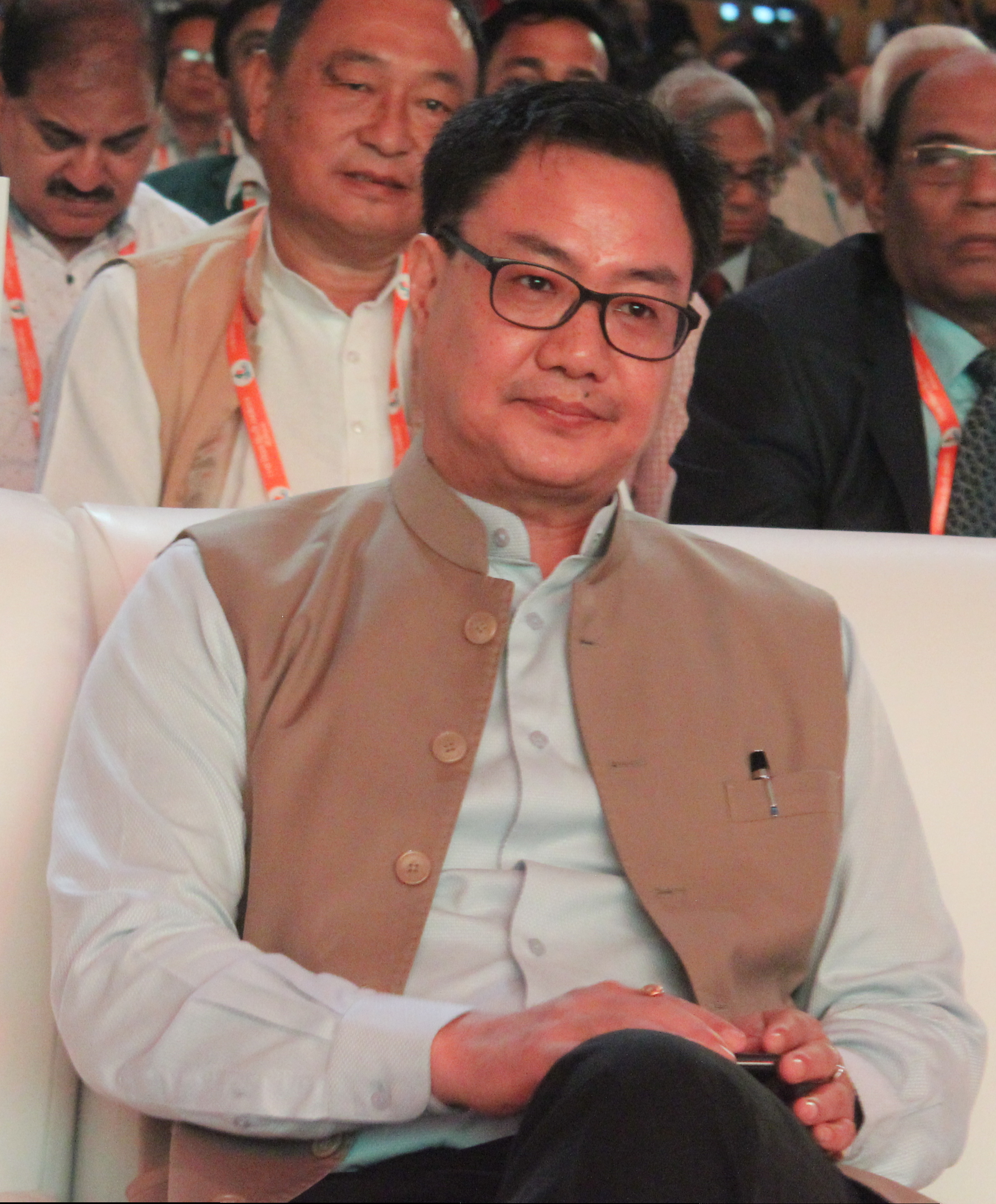

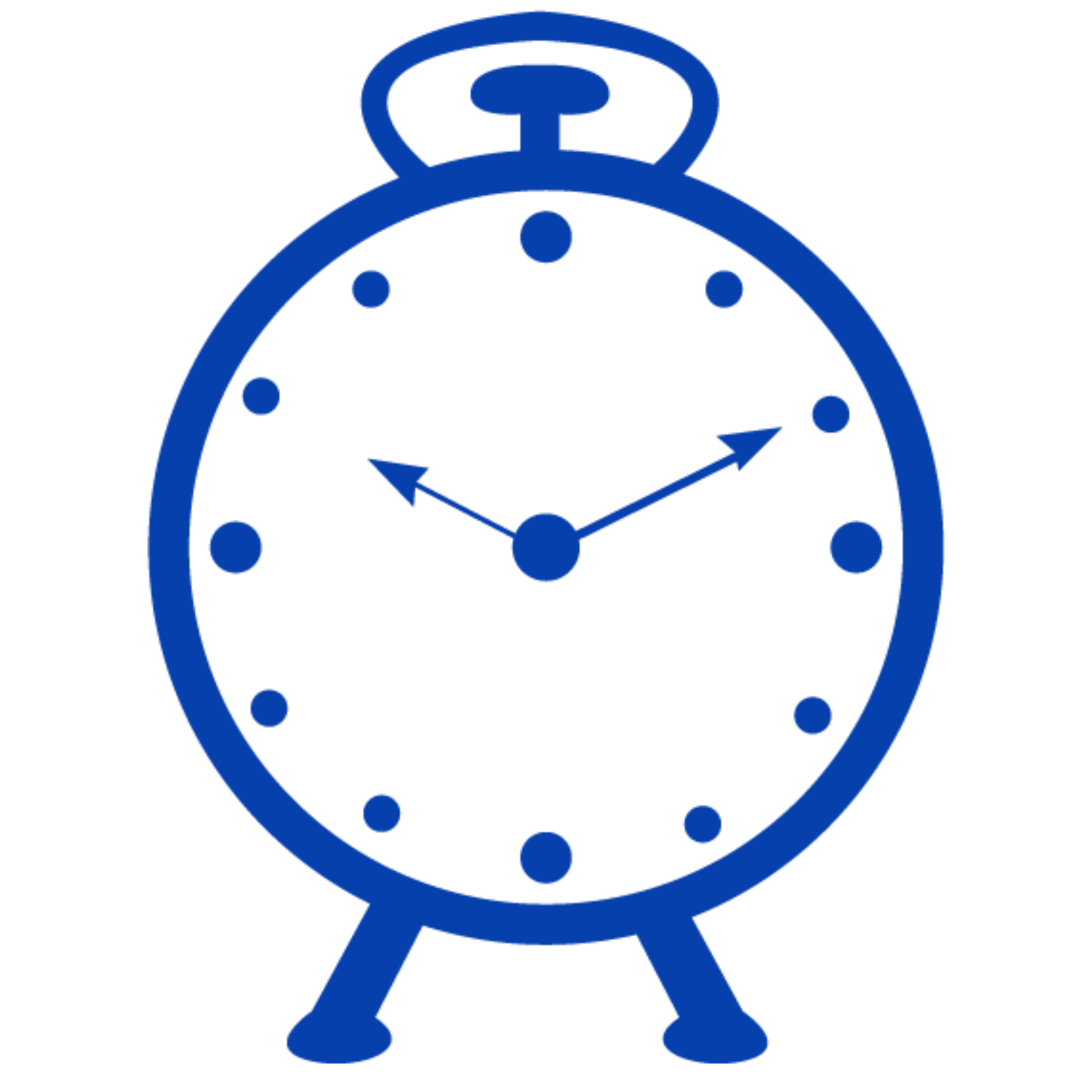
	Majority party	Minority party
Leader	Gegong Apang	Kiren Rijiju
Party	INC	BJP
Alliance	UPA	NDA
Leader's seat	Tuting Yingkiong	Did not contest
Last election	53	0
Seats won	34	9
Seat change	▼19	▲9
Percentage	44.41%	19%
	Third party	Fourth party
Party	NCP	AC
Alliance	UPA	NDA
Last election	4	1
Seats won	2	2
Seat change	▼2	▲1
Percentage	4.28%	3.88%
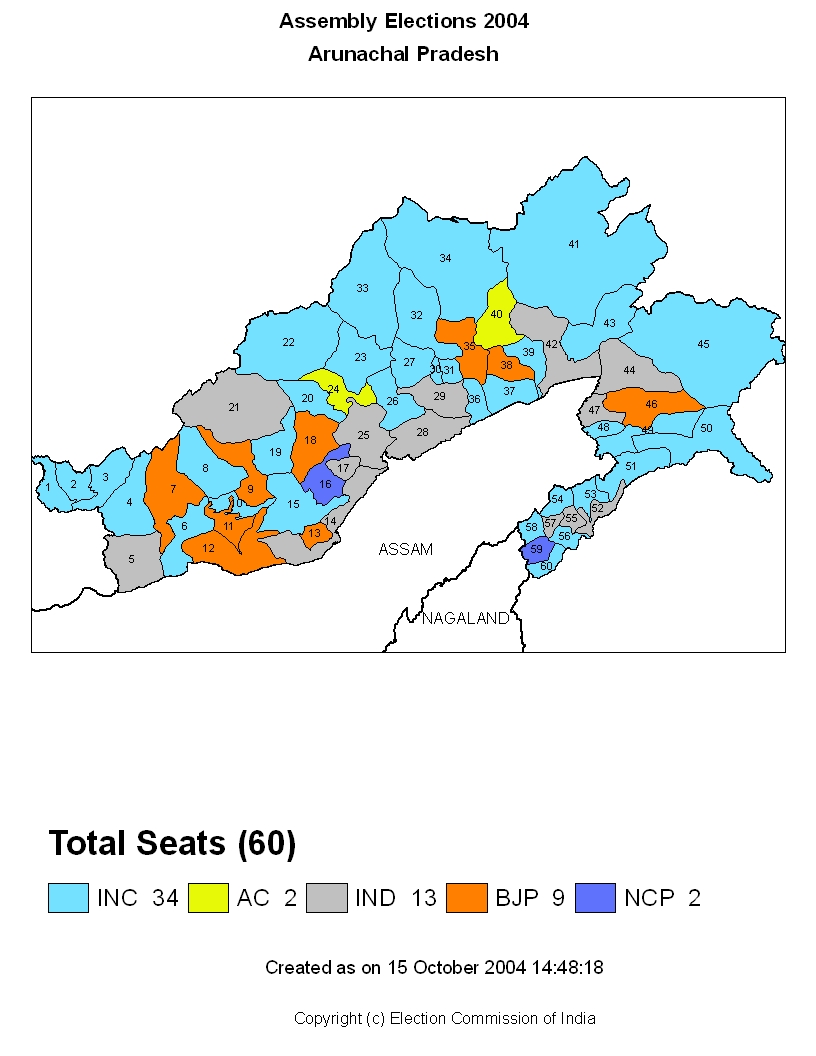
- 2004 Arunachal Pradesh Legislative Assembly election results
CM before election
Gegong Apang
INC
Elected CM
Gegong Apang
INC

The Arunachal Pradesh Legislative Assembly election, 2004 took place in 2004 to elect 60 seats in the Arunachal Pradesh Legislative Assembly. The results were declared on 10 October 2004. The Indian National Congress won the popular vote and a majority of seats and Gegong Apang was re-elected as Chief Minister of Arunachal Pradesh.

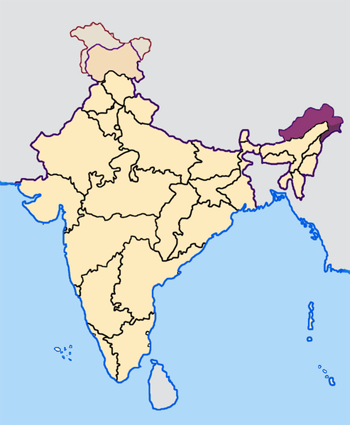
Arunachal Pradesh, a state of India located in north.

== Parties contested ==
Party	Flag	Symbol	Leader	Seats contested
Indian National Congress			Gegong Apang	60
Bharatiya Janata Party			Kiren Rijiju	39
Arunachal Congress			Kamen Ringu	11
Nationalist Congress Party			Sharad Pawar	10

== Result ==
Party	Candidates	Seats	Votes	%
Bharatiya Janata Party	39	9	87312	19%
Indian National Congress	60	34	204102	44.41%
Nationalist Congress Party	10	2	19673	4.28%
Arunachal Congress	11	2	17817	3.88%
Independents	48	13	130654	28.43%
Total:	168	60	459558	

=== Results by constituency ===
Winner, runner-up, voter turnout, and victory margin in every constituency
Assembly Constituency		Turnout	Winner				Runner Up				Margin
#k	Names	%	Candidate	Party	Votes	%	Candidate	Party	Votes	%	Margin
1	Lumla	87.37%	T. G. Rinpoche	INC	3,318	53.79%	Jambey Wangdi	Independent	2,851	46.21%	467
2	Tawang	70.05%	Tsewang Dhondup	INC	3,786	39.2%	Thupten Tempa	Independent	2,441	60.8%	1,345
3	Mukto	-	Dorjee Khandu	INC	Elected Unopposed						
4	Dirang	-	Tsering Gyurme	INC	Elected Unopposed						
5	Kalaktang	64.3%	Rinchin Khandu Khrimey	Independent	3,149	44.45%	D. K. Thongdok	INC	2,520	55.55%	629
6	Thrizino-Buragaon	65.15%	Naresh Glow	INC	3,366	49.65%	Govardhan Nimasow	BJP	3,319	50.35%	47
7	Bomdila	61.17%	R. T. Khunjuju	BJP	2,955	38.16%	Japu Deru	INC	2,417	46.65%	538
8	Bameng	63.08%	Kumar Waii	INC	3,860	47.04%	Mekup Dolo	BJP	3,428	52.96%	432
9	Chayangtajo	64.01%	Kameng Dolo	BJP	4,068	45.32%	Tara Bagang	INC	3,371	54.68%	697
10	Seppa East	50.52%	Atum Welly	INC	3,939	53.12%	Tame Phassang	Independent	3,476	46.88%	463
11	Seppa West	77.22%	Tani Loffa	BJP	3,123	43.78%	Hari Notung	INC	2,432	56.22%	691
12	Pakke-Kessang	75.83%	Techi Hemu	BJP	2,898	41.36%	Niani Natung	INC	2,044	58.64%	854
13	Itanagar	45.6%	Kipa Babu	BJP	9,575	40.82%	Lichi Legi	INC	7,950	10.01%	1,625
14	Doimukh	66.63%	Ngurang Pinch	Independent	5,243	3.88%	T.C. Teli	INC	3,988	49.4%	1,255
15	Sagalee	-	Nabam Tuki	INC	Elected Unopposed						
16	Yachuli	80.8%	Nikh Kamin	NCP	6,191	54.39%	Likha Maj	INC	5,099	44.79%	1,092
17	Ziro–Hapoli	65.69%	Nani Ribia	Independent	7,125	55.3%	Padi Richo	INC	5,760	44.7%	1,365
18	Palin	72.37%	Balo Raja	BJP	5,545	54.37%	Takam Sanjoy	INC	4,653	45.63%	892
19	Nyapin	60.64%	Tatar Kipa	INC	3,794	43.61%	Bamang Felix	AC	3,615	45.77%	179
20	Tali	67.62%	Takam Sorang	INC	3,155	45.6%	Gichak Thaji Kiogi	BJP	2,645	54.4%	510
21	Koloriang	64.62%	Lokam Tassar	Independent	3,823	48.46%	Kahfa Bengia	INC	3,594	51.54%	229
22	Nacho	74.52%	Tanga Byaling	INC	3,235	24.11%	Tarik Rava	Independent	1,519	51.34%	1,716
23	Taliha	69.67%	Nyato Rigia	INC	2,881	57.48%	Taning Tasiring	Independent	2,034	40.58%	847
24	Daporijo	59.73%	Daklo Nidak	AC	3,652	36.29%	Yari Dulom	INC	3,260	31.32%	392
25	Raga	79.06%	Nido Pavitra	Independent	4,258	39.58%	Talo Mugli	BJP	3,029	28.16%	1,229
26	Dumporijo	69.27%	Takar Marde	INC	3,379	37.56%	Takar Doni	Independent	3,224	12.85%	155
27	Liromoba	79.8%	Jarbom Gamlin	INC	4,404	46.55%	Lijum Ronya	Independent	3,965	51.7%	439
28	Likabali	73.62%	Jomde Kena	Independent	4,081	57.5%	Rima Taipodia	INC	3,017	42.5%	1,064
29	Basar	71.06%	Gojen Gadi	Independent	7,755	35.62%	Eken Riba	INC	4,291	64.38%	3,464
30	Along West	84.79%	Gadam Ete	INC	3,926	.38%	Jumbi Bagra	Independent	3,636	44.77%	290
31	Along East	69.18%	Kito Sora	INC	4,604	53.38%	Yomto Jini	BJP	3,938	45.66%	666
32	Rumgong	73.1%	Dibang Tatak	INC	3,742	44.74%	Tamiyo Taga	Independent	3,254	38.91%	488
33	Mechuka	79.71%	Tadik Chije	INC	3,680	55.08%	Pasang Wangchuk Sona	Independent	3,001	44.92%	679
34	Tuting–Yingkiong	67.59%	Gegong Apang	INC	6,286	79.17%	Ojing Komboh	BJP	1,654	20.83%	4,632
35	Pangin	73.6%	Tapang Taloh	BJP	5,163	54.7%	Tanyong Tatak	INC	4,275	45.3%	888
36	Nari-Koyu	80.76%	Tako Dabi	INC	1,969	40.18%	Karto Kaye	Independent	1,754	18.84%	215
37	Pasighat West	82.%	Omak Apang	INC	4,894	42.73%	Dr. Tangor Tapak	BJP	3,651	57.27%	1,243
38	Pasighat East	57.89%	Bosiram Siram	BJP	5,267	14.36%	Ninong Ering	INC	4,145	47.38%	1,122
39	Mebo	85.17%	Lombo Tayeng	INC	3,607	50.82%	Ralom Borang	Independent	3,490	49.18%	117
40	Mariyang-Geku	78.84%	J. K. Panggeng	AC	4,376	10.22%	Kabang Borang	INC	2,491	9.94%	1,885
41	Anini	64.06%	Rajesh Tacho	INC	1,263	25.41%	Paro Molo	AC	1,003	41.57%	260
42	Dambuk	75.64%	Roding Pertin	Independent	3,513	5.14%	Jomin Tayeng	INC	3,462	46.88%	51
43	Roing	62.09%	Mutchu Mithi	INC	3,837	39.45%	Laeta Umbrey	BJP	2,500	60.55%	1,337
44	Tezu	59.6%	Karikho Kri	Independent	5,684	3.87%	Nakul Chai	INC	3,272	35.12%	2,412
45	Hayuliang	80.76%	Kalikho Pul	INC	4,658	39.63%	Khapriso Krong	BJP	3,058	60.37%	1,600
46	Chowkham	62.95%	Chowna Mein	BJP	2,431	19.31%	Chow Indrajit Namchoom	Independent	1,796	20.58%	635
47	Namsai	68.%	Chow Pingthika Namchoom	Independent	6,069	46.48%	Chow Pingthika Namchoom	INC	5,559	42.57%	510
48	Lekang	72.36%	Chowna Mein	INC	5,091	14.91%	Chow Naching Loongchot	Independent	2,073	52.1%	3,018
49	Bordumsa-Diyun	73.36%	C. C. Singpho	INC	3,816	34.84%	Mayong Maio	Independent	3,272	2.95%	544
50	Miao	64.55%	Kamlung Mossang	INC	5,587	53.09%	Kittang Kitnal Muklom	Independent	4,936	46.91%	651
51	Nampong	68.7%	Setong Sena	INC	3,910	59.38%	Komoli Mosang	Independent	2,675	40.62%	1,235
52	Changlang South	82.42%	Phosum Khimhun	Independent	1,994	50.04%	Ngungtim Changmi	INC	1,991	49.96%	3
53	Changlang North	64.3%	Wangnia Pongte	INC	3,356	21.94%	Thinghaap Taiju	Independent	2,553	44.33%	803
54	Namsang	61.23%	Wangki Lowang	INC	3,449	23.13%	Wangpha Lowang	Independent	1,284	62.13%	2,165
55	Khonsa East	62.%	Kamthok Lowang	Independent	4,459	3.48%	Chopnei Chimyang	AC	1,060	77.98%	3,399
56	Khonsa West	89.66%	Thajam Aboh	INC	3,239	44.38%	Yumsem Matey	Independent	3,134	45.87%	105
57	Borduria–Bagapani	78.84%	Wanglin Lowangdong	Independent	2,909	40.49%	Lowangcha Wanglat	INC	1,979	59.51%	930
58	Kanubari	80.49%	Newlai Tingkhatra	INC	2,194	29.35%	Laichoi Wangpan	NCP	2,055	16.2%	139
59	Longding–Pumao	83.11%	Thangwang Wangham	NCP	2,567	29.8%	Tingpong Wangham	INC	2,188	21.83%	379
60	Pongchau-Wakka	88.49%	Honchun Ngandam	INC	4,821	12.41%	Anok Wangsa	NCP	3,324	42.83%	1,497
