= 1995 Arunachal Pradesh Legislative Assembly election =

- 21 March 1995

All 60 seats in the Arunachal Pradesh Legislative Assembly 31 seats needed for a majority
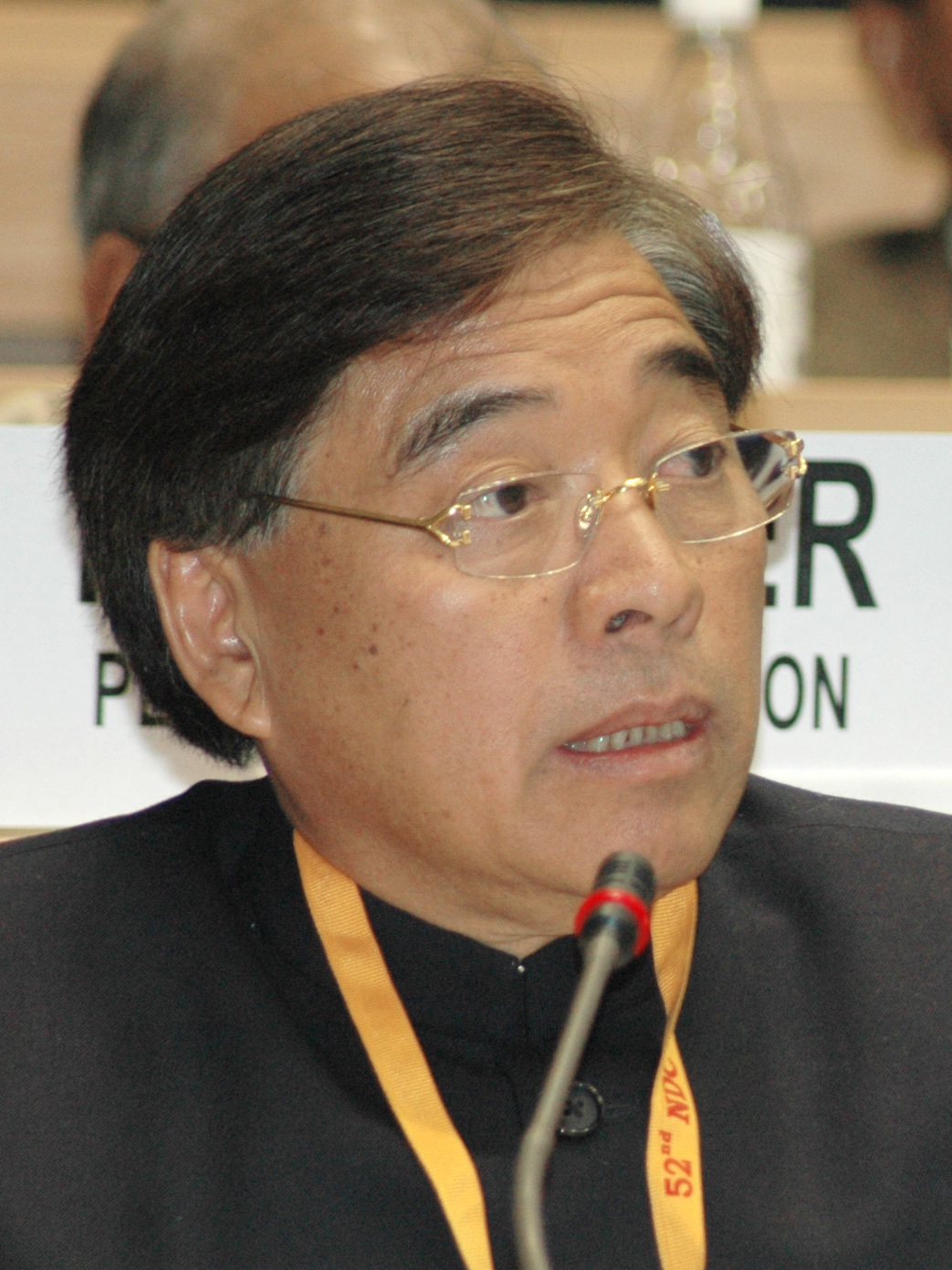

	Majority party	Minority party
Leader	Gegong Apang
Party	INC	JD
Seats before	37	11
Seats won	43	3
Seat change	▲6	▼8
CM before election
Gegong Apang
INC
Elected CM
Gegong Apang
INC

The 5th Arunachal Pradesh Legislative Assembly election was held in 1995. The Indian National Congress won the popular vote and a majority of seats and Gegong Apang was re-elected as Chief Minister of Arunachal Pradesh.

Voting was staged at 1,728 polling stations. The average number of electors per polling station was 309.

== Election results ==
Party	CONTESTED	WON	FD	VOTES	%	SEATS
1 . BJP	15	0	11	14335	3.37%	11.45%
2 . INC	60	43	0	214543	50.50%	50.50%
3 . JD	34	3	8	73248	17.24%	29.65%
4 . JP	5	2	1	10743	2.53%	28.49%
INDEPENDENTS						
5 . IND	59	12	19	111958	26.35%	39.11%
Grand Total :	173	60	39	424827		

=== Results by constituency ===
Winner, runner-up, voter turnout, and victory margin in every constituency
Assembly Constituency		Turnout	Winner				Runner Up				Margin
#k	Names	%	Candidate	Party	Votes	%	Candidate	Party	Votes	%	Margin
1	Lumla	94.64%	T. G. Rinpoche	Independent	3,031	55.69%	Jambey Wangdi	INC	1,834	34.39%	1,197
2	Tawang	87.5%	Thupten Tempa	INC	3,024	51.79%	Theg Tse Rinpoche	Independent	2,815	48.21%	209
3	Mukto	90.37%	Dorjee Khandu	INC	3,532	74.4%	Rinchen Dorjee	JD	1,215	25.6%	2,317
4	Dirang	84.59%	Tsering Gyurme	INC	4,054	50.51%	Lobsang Tsering	Independent	2,791	34.77%	1,263
5	Kalaktang	79.49%	Rinchin Khandu Khrimey	INC	4,071	61.16%	Nima Tsering Khrime	BJP	2,585	38.84%	1,486
6	Thrizino-Buragaon	81.5%	Naresh Glow	Independent	2,493	42.04%	Sinam Dususow	INC	1,563	26.36%	930
7	Bomdila	77.54%	Japu Deru	INC	3,358	56.96%	R. T. Khunjuju	Independent	2,537	43.04%	821
8	Bameng	64.29%	Medhi Dodum	INC	4,525	73.18%	Donglo Sonam	JD	1,658	26.82%	2,867
9	Chayangtajo	78.32%	Kameng Dolo	INC	3,849	54.84%	Tame Phassang	JD	3,170	45.16%	679
10	Seppa East	76.49%	Bida Tako	JP	3,193	45.73%	Atum Welly	JD	2,062	29.53%	1,131
11	Seppa West	85.87%	Hari Notung	INC	1,620	36.15%	Rachob Taba	JD	1,326	29.59%	294
12	Pakke-Kessang	84.1%	Dera Natung	INC	2,838	56.34%	Techi Hemu	Independent	1,715	34.05%	1,123
13	Itanagar	63.53%	Lichi Legi	INC	11,740	52.27%	Nabum Rebia	JD	6,717	29.9%	5,023
14	Doimukh	79.61%	T.C. Teli	JD	4,814	55.02%	Ngurang Tazap	INC	3,936	44.98%	878
15	Sagalee	81.94%	Nabam Tuki	INC	4,579	62.73%	Taba Haniya	Independent	2,472	33.86%	2,107
16	Yachuli	79.37%	Neelam Taram	INC	5,933	79.03%	Bida Taba Goyee	JD	1,574	20.97%	4,359
17	Ziro–Hapoli	68.24%	Tapi Batt	JP	3,894	36.01%	Kuru Hasang	INC	3,681	34.04%	213
18	Palin	72.01%	Takam Sanjoy	JD	4,072	57.92%	Dugi Tajik	INC	2,805	39.9%	1,267
19	Nyapin	71.59%	Tadar Taniang	INC	3,062	41.05%	Tatar Kipa	JD	2,538	34.03%	524
20	Tali	63.23%	Zara Tata	INC	2,182	53.34%	Rigio Tache	Independent	1,752	42.83%	430
21	Koloriang	75.52%	Kahfa Bengia	Independent	3,286	50.22%	Chera Talo	INC	3,197	48.86%	89
22	Nacho	87.36%	Tarik Rava	INC	1,940	42.86%	Tanga Byaling	JD	1,624	35.88%	316
23	Taliha	82.37%	Punji Mara	Independent	1,677	40.33%	Tara Payeng	INC	1,031	24.8%	646
24	Daporijo	74.34%	Daklo Nidak	Independent	3,911	51.37%	Tadak Dulom	INC	3,702	48.63%	209
25	Raga	81.68%	Talo Mugli	INC	5,147	71.31%	Lonku Tania	JD	2,071	28.69%	3,076
26	Dumporijo	89.13%	Takar Doni	INC	3,405	56.31%	Tadam Lida	JD	2,642	43.69%	763
27	Liromoba	84.42%	Lijum Ronya	INC	3,566	63.38%	Libi Yomgam	Independent	1,995	35.46%	1,571
28	Likabali	81.03%	Kardu Taipodia	INC	3,774	66.16%	Rima Taipodia	Independent	1,820	31.91%	1,954
29	Basar	82.71%	Tomo Riba	Independent	5,138	52.72%	Gojen Gadi	INC	4,360	44.74%	778
30	Along West	88.77%	Kento Ete	INC	3,086	47.39%	Kirge Eshi	JD	2,110	32.4%	976
31	Along East	77.82%	Doi Ado	INC	2,815	37.33%	Gumli Lollen	Independent	2,462	32.65%	353
32	Rumgong	88.62%	Dibang Tatak	INC	2,901	46.34%	Tamiyo Taga	JD	2,709	43.27%	192
33	Mechuka	91.35%	Pasang Wangchuk Sona	INC	1,843	39.81%	Tadik Chije	JD	1,632	35.26%	211
34	Tuting–Yingkiong	85.26%	Gegong Apang	INC	6,189	80.3%	Oteng Jongkey	JD	1,518	19.7%	4,671
35	Pangin	88.74%	Tahung Tatak	INC	3,358	43.53%	Tanyong Tatak	BJP	2,337	30.29%	1,021
36	Nari-Koyu	86.92%	Tako Dabi	INC	1,947	49.86%	Tanya Dabi	Independent	1,726	44.2%	221
37	Pasighat West	88.33%	Yadap Apang	INC	4,165	51.39%	Tatong Padung	Independent	3,861	47.64%	304
38	Pasighat East	77.17%	Tobar Jamoh	INC	5,410	54.2%	Ninong Ering	Independent	3,907	39.14%	1,503
39	Mebo	85.54%	Lombo Tayeng	INC	2,772	48.08%	Bakin Pertin	JD	1,872	32.47%	900
40	Mariyang-Geku	86.18%	Kabang Borang	INC	3,684	49.44%	J. K. Panggeng	Independent	2,501	33.56%	1,183
41	Anini	82.34%	Tade Tacho	INC	1,274	42.13%	Rajesh Tacho	JD	1,215	40.18%	59
42	Dambuk	85.37%	Roding Pertin	Independent	3,513	51.81%	Bidi Lego	INC	3,267	48.19%	246
43	Roing	79.35%	Mutchu Mithi	INC	4,258	58.55%	Akane Linggi	Independent	2,421	33.29%	1,837
44	Tezu	80.59%	Sobeng Tayang	INC	4,694	55.13%	Sotai Kri	BJP	2,769	32.52%	1,925
45	Hayuliang	87.%	Kalikho Pul	INC	5,261	67.24%	Khapriso Krong	JD	2,563	32.76%	2,698
46	Chowkham	82.34%	Chow Tewa Mein	INC	3,793	47.56%	Indrajit Namchoom	JD	2,949	36.97%	844
47	Namsai	86.61%	Chow Rajingda Namshum	INC	6,791	52.84%	Chow Pingthika Namchoom	JD	6,061	47.16%	730
48	Lekang	91.88%	Chowna Mein	JD	5,913	60.12%	Omem Moyong Deori	INC	3,923	39.88%	1,990
49	Bordumsa-Diyun	87.62%	C. C. Singpho	INC	3,811	51.03%	Singdu Nong Singpho	Independent	2,544	34.07%	1,267
50	Miao	87.72%	Samchom Ngemu	INC	6,140	59.32%	Kamlung Mossang	Independent	4,210	40.68%	1,930
51	Nampong	81.94%	Setong Sena	Independent	4,054	61.%	Komoli Mosang	INC	2,592	39.%	1,462
52	Changlang South	89.74%	Tengam Ngemu	INC	1,774	55.94%	Ngungtim Changmi	Independent	1,397	44.06%	377
53	Changlang North	87.24%	Thinghaap Taiju	Independent	3,373	50.62%	Wangnia Pongte	INC	3,291	49.38%	82
54	Namsang	84.7%	Wangcha Rajkumar	Independent	3,842	60.56%	Wangpha Lowang	INC	2,502	39.44%	1,340
55	Khonsa East	82.81%	T. L. Rajkumar	INC	3,062	49.93%	Kamthok Lowang	Independent	3,033	49.45%	29
56	Khonsa West	89.68%	Sijen Kongkang	INC	3,506	59.%	Wangdi Hakhun	Independent	2,436	41.%	1,070
57	Borduria–Bagapani	87.37%	Lowangcha Wanglat	INC	3,653	71.53%	Dinwang Lowang	Independent	1,454	28.47%	2,199
58	Kanubari	91.65%	Noksong Boham	INC	2,351	40.64%	Hejam Ponglaham	Independent	1,858	32.12%	493
59	Longding–Pumao	90.06%	Tingpong Wangham	Independent	4,256	63.13%	Langfu Lukham	INC	2,486	36.87%	1,770
60	Pongchau-Wakka	90.58%	Honchun Ngandam	Independent	4,136	40.94%	Anok Wangsa	INC	3,908	38.68%	228
