= 1999 Arunachal Pradesh Legislative Assembly election =

- 3 October 1999

All 60 seats in the Arunachal Pradesh Legislative Assembly 31 seats needed for a majority
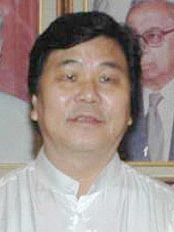
	Majority party	Minority party
Leader	Mukut Mithi
Party	INC	NCP
Leader's seat	Roing
Last election	43	new
Seats won	53	4
Seat change	▲10	▲4
Chief Minister before election
Gegong Apang
AC
Elected Chief Minister
Mukut Mithi
INC

The 6th Arunachal Pradesh Legislative Assembly election was held in October 1999. The Indian National Congress won 53 out of 60 seats and Mukut Mithi became the new Chief Minister, replacing Gegong Apang.

== Election schedule ==
The polling schedule for the 1999 General Elections and State Assembly elections was announced by the Chief Election Commissioner on 11 July 1999.

Poll event	Phase
Poll event	V
Notification date	7 September 1999
Last date for filing nomination	14 September 1999
Scrutiny of nomination	15 September 1999
Last Date for withdrawal of nomination	17 September 1999
Date of poll	3 October 1999
Date of counting of votes/Result	6 October 1999

== Results ==
Party	Votes	%	Seats	+/–
Indian National Congress	213,097	51.78	53	▲10
Arunachal Congress	68,645	16.68	1	–
Bharatiya Janata Party	44,556	10.83	0	–
Nationalist Congress Party	35,967	8.74	4	–
Ajeya Bharat Party	425	0.10	0	–
Independents	48,842	11.87	2	–
Total	411,532	100.00	60	0
Valid votes	411,532	96.99		
Invalid/blank votes	12,770	3.01		
Total votes	424,302	100.00		
Registered voters/turnout	611,481	69.39		
Source: ECI

=== Results by constituency ===
Winner, runner-up, voter turnout, and victory margin in every constituency
Assembly Constituency		Turnout	Winner				Runner Up				Margin
#k	Names	%	Candidate	Party	Votes	%	Candidate	Party	Votes	%	Margin
1	Lumla	91.54%	T. G. Rinpoche	INC	3,282	56.03%	Sange Nawang	AC	2,576	43.97%	706
2	Tawang	-	Thupten Tempa	INC	Elected Unopposed						
3	Mukto	88.9%	Dorjee Khandu	INC	2,777	56.88%	Theg Tse Rinpoche	NCP	2,105	43.12%	672
4	Dirang	77.49%	Tsering Gyurme	INC	4,472	58.%	Tongchen Jomba Khrimey	BJP	2,949	38.25%	1,523
5	Kalaktang	69.28%	D. K. Thongdok	INC	2,630	43.68%	Rinchin Khandu Khrimey	BJP	2,359	39.18%	271
6	Thrizino-Buragaon	74.44%	Naresh Glow	INC	3,334	50.57%	Govardhon Nimasow	AC	3,259	49.43%	75
7	Bomdila	66.54%	Japu Deru	INC	2,515	44.68%	R. T. Khunjuju	Independent	2,155	38.28%	360
8	Bameng	64.89%	Mekup Dolo	Independent	2,916	43.86%	Medi Ram Dodum	INC	2,032	30.57%	884
9	Chayangtajo	65.%	Kameng Dolo	INC	3,569	59.94%	Sama Yangfo	AC	2,322	39.%	1,247
10	Seppa East	60.53%	Atum Welly	NCP	3,491	53.24%	Bida Tako	INC	3,066	46.76%	425
11	Seppa West	78.64%	Hari Notung	INC	2,594	57.49%	Tani Loffa	AC	1,918	42.51%	676
12	Pakke-Kessang	72.%	Dera Natung	INC	2,421	53.57%	Techi Hemu	AC	2,098	46.43%	323
13	Itanagar	51.26%	Lichi Legi	INC	6,766	35.83%	Mallo Tarin	BJP	4,612	24.42%	2,154
14	Doimukh	72.17%	T.C. Teli	INC	3,864	40.97%	Ngurang Pinch	AC	2,630	27.89%	1,234
15	Sagalee	79.31%	Nabam Tuki	INC	5,699	79.53%	Nabam Nikia	AC	1,467	20.47%	4,232
16	Yachuli	79.75%	Jotom Toko Takam	NCP	3,816	43.58%	Neelam Taram	INC	3,358	38.35%	458
17	Ziro–Hapoli	70.66%	Padi Richo	INC	5,536	49.79%	Nani Ribia	BJP	2,595	23.34%	2,941
18	Palin	71.41%	Takam Sanjoy	INC	6,471	82.93%	Charu Tuglo	NCP	1,266	16.22%	5,205
19	Nyapin	69.37%	Tatar Kipa	INC	5,231	68.87%	Tako Changriang	AC	2,365	31.13%	2,866
20	Tali	66.35%	Takam Sorang	INC	2,919	64.67%	Tarang Tagru	AC	1,547	34.27%	1,372
21	Koloriang	68.18%	Kahfa Bengia	INC	6,658	97.67%	Lokam Tassar	AC	159	2.33%	6,499
22	Nacho	77.13%	Tanga Byaling	INC	2,646	47.86%	Taring Dui	BJP	1,835	33.19%	811
23	Taliha	72.96%	Nyato Rigia	INC	1,829	38.36%	Punji Mara	AC	1,386	29.07%	443
24	Daporijo	62.11%	Tadak Dulom	INC	4,116	46.09%	Daklo Nidak	AC	2,439	27.31%	1,677
25	Raga	73.71%	Talo Mugli	INC	4,939	61.47%	Kabak Tacho	Independent	2,744	34.15%	2,195
26	Dumporijo	83.07%	Takar Marde	INC	5,006	61.65%	Takar Doni	AC	3,114	38.35%	1,892
27	Liromoba	81.78%	Lijum Ronya	INC	4,316	60.4%	Gegong Apang	AC	2,830	39.6%	1,486
28	Likabali	78.46%	Rima Taipodia	INC	1,920	33.79%	Jomde Kena	Independent	1,775	31.24%	145
29	Basar	74.41%	Eken Riba	INC	3,760	36.68%	Gojen Gadi	Independent	3,372	32.89%	388
30	Along West	82.14%	Kento Ete	INC	4,647	65.37%	Kirge Eshi	AC	2,462	34.63%	2,185
31	Along East	72.53%	Kito Sora	INC	3,009	41.07%	Gumli Lollen	NCP	2,457	33.54%	552
32	Rumgong	81.89%	Tamiyo Taga	INC	4,031	55.6%	Dibang Tatak	AC	2,673	36.87%	1,358
33	Mechuka	86.47%	Tadik Chije	INC	3,791	63.58%	Pasang Wangchuk Sona	AC	2,172	36.42%	1,619
34	Tuting–Yingkiong	72.87%	Gegong Apang	AC	4,591	60.66%	Anong Jongkey	INC	2,978	39.34%	1,613
35	Pangin	82.92%	Tanyong Tatak	INC	4,173	48.89%	Tapang Taloh	BJP	3,204	37.54%	969
36	Nari-Koyu	81.26%	Tako Dabi	INC	2,994	68.%	Tajum Ringu	AC	1,403	31.86%	1,591
37	Pasighat West	74.17%	Dr. Tangor Tapak	INC	3,759	48.84%	Yadap Apang	AC	2,296	29.83%	1,463
38	Pasighat East	68.28%	Ninong Ering	INC	6,302	58.17%	Bosiram Siram	BJP	4,350	40.15%	1,952
39	Mebo	75.64%	Lombo Tayeng	INC	3,612	56.32%	Katon Borang	AC	2,392	37.3%	1,220
40	Mariyang-Geku	82.75%	Kabang Borang	INC	3,178	43.14%	J. K. Panggeng	AC	2,813	38.19%	365
41	Anini	-	Rajesh Tacho	INC	Elected Unopposed						
42	Dambuk	73.59%	Roding Pertin	INC	4,064	60.31%	Tony Pertin	AC	2,675	39.69%	1,389
43	Roing	-	Mutchu Mithi	INC	Elected Unopposed						
44	Tezu	67.58%	Nakul Chai	INC	3,313	37.58%	Karikho Kri	Independent	3,089	35.04%	224
45	Hayuliang	81.26%	Kalikho Pul	INC	6,778	86.18%	Khuje Drai	BJP	566	7.2%	6,212
46	Chowkham	67.81%	Indrajit Namchoom	Independent	4,429	54.68%	Chowna Mein	INC	3,200	39.51%	1,229
47	Namsai	73.42%	Chow Pingthika Namchoom	INC	6,609	58.49%	Chow Empu Chowpoo	BJP	2,219	19.64%	4,390
48	Lekang	82.4%	Chowna Mein	INC	5,482	53.68%	Sotai Kri	BJP	4,730	46.32%	752
49	Bordumsa-Diyun	79.92%	C. C. Singpho	INC	2,604	33.64%	Khumral Lungphi	Independent	2,152	27.8%	452
50	Miao	71.96%	Samchom Ngemu	INC	5,334	51.75%	Kamlung Mossang	Independent	4,973	48.25%	361
51	Nampong	70.82%	Setong Sena	INC	3,024	50.13%	Komoli Mosang	BJP	3,008	49.87%	16
52	Changlang South	86.%	Phosum Khimhun	INC	2,122	60.05%	Ngungtim Changmi	BJP	1,412	39.95%	710
53	Changlang North	71.58%	Thinghaap Taiju	INC	3,516	48.16%	Wangnia Pongte	Independent	2,522	34.55%	994
54	Namsang	61.61%	Wangki Lowang	NCP	2,623	52.2%	Changkom Hondik	INC	2,402	47.8%	221
55	Khonsa East	-	T. L. Rajkumar	INC	Elected Unopposed						
56	Khonsa West	88.63%	Thajam Aboh	INC	2,754	45.2%	Hangliam Sumnyan	NCP	2,208	36.24%	546
57	Borduria–Bagapani	71.42%	Lowangcha Wanglat	INC	2,289	50.14%	Wanglin Lowangdong	Independent	2,276	49.86%	13
58	Kanubari	85.62%	Newlai Tingkhatra	INC	2,386	39.51%	Laichoi Wangpan	Independent	1,123	18.6%	1,263
59	Longding–Pumao	82.67%	Tingpong Wangham	INC	2,567	38.81%	Thangwang Wangham	NCP	1,892	28.6%	675
60	Pongchau-Wakka	81.1%	Anok Wangsa	NCP	4,902	52.4%	Honchun Ngandam	INC	4,453	47.6%	449
