= 1980 Arunachal Pradesh Legislative Assembly election =

1980 legislative assembly elections in Arunachal Pradesh

← 1978	3 January 1980	1984 →

All 30 seats in the Arunachal Pradesh Legislative Assembly 16 seats needed for a majority
- Registered: 258,112
- Turnout: 69.76%
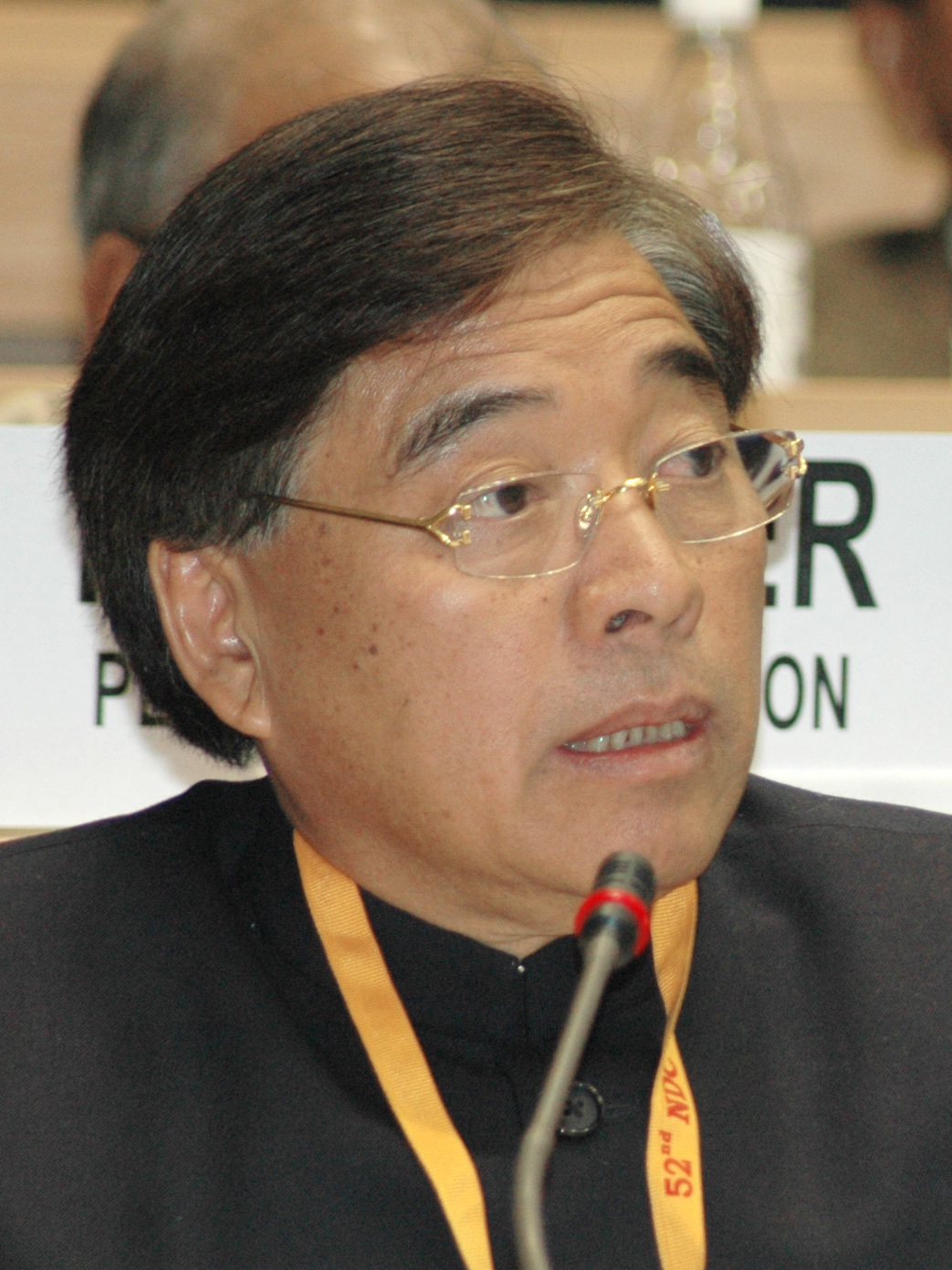
	Majority party	Minority party
		PPA
Leader	Gegong Apang
Party	INC(I)	PPA
Leader's seat	Yingkiong Pangin
Last election	0	8
Seats won	13	13
Seat change	▲13	▲5
Popular vote	42.58%	40.98%
CM before election
President's rule
Elected CM
Gegong Apang
INC

The second elections to the Arunachal Pradesh Legislative Assembly were held on 3 January 1980. The election was held simultaneously to the 1980 Lok Sabha election. 30 seats were up for election. A total of 95 candidates contested; 28 from the Indian National Congress (Indira), 28 from the People's Party of Arunachal, 11 from the Indian National Congress (Urs) and 28 independents. The PPA candidate in the Niausa Kanubari constituency, Wangnam Wangshu, was elected unopposed.

INC(I) won 13 seats (with 72,734 votes, 42.58%). The PPA also won 13 seats, with 70,006 votes (40.98%). The remaining four seats went to independents. In total independent candidates mustered 19,716 votes (11.54%). INC(U) failed to win any seats. The party obtained 8,361 votes (4.89%). For the first time a woman, Nyari Welly, was elected to the assembly. After the election there were massive defections to the INC(I). Gegong Apang was elected Chief Minister after the election.

== Results ==
Party	Votes	%	Seats	+/–
Indian National Congress (Indira)	72,734	42.58	13	New
People's Party of Arunachal	70,006	40.98	13	▲5
Indian National Congress (Urs)	8,361	4.89	0	New
Independents	19,716	11.54	4	▼1
Total	170,817	100.00	30	0
Valid votes	170,817	94.87		
Invalid/blank votes	9,235	5.13		
Total votes	180,052	100.00		
Registered voters/turnout	258,112	69.76		
Source: ECI

== Elected members ==
Winner, runner-up, voter turnout, and victory margin in every constituency
Assembly Constituency		Turnout	Winner				Runner Up				Margin
#k	Names	%	Candidate	Party	Votes	%	Candidate	Party	Votes	%	Margin
1	Tawang-I	71.33%	Karma Wangchu	PPA	2,555	69.64%	Pem Gombu	INC(I)	1,114	30.36%	1,441
2	Tawang-II	81.59%	Tsering Tashi	PPA	1,900	48.17%	Tashi Khandu	INC(I)	1,886	47.82%	14
3	Dirang–Kalaktang	78.92%	Nima Tsering Rupa	INC(I)	3,169	54.4%	Dorjee Tsering Samphung	INC(U)	1,501	25.77%	1,668
4	Bomdila	72.16%	Sinam Dususow Bomdila	PPA	2,133	52.69%	Rinchin Kharu Nafra	INC(I)	1,915	47.31%	218
5	Seppa	57.09%	Nyari Welly	PPA	2,817	43.28%	Modi Sengi	INC(I)	2,339	35.93%	478
6	Chayangtajo	58.43%	Kameng Dolo	Independent	1,894	34.89%	Tame Yangfo	PPA	1,859	34.24%	35
7	Koloriang	63.35%	Lokam Tado	INC(I)	2,377	57.61%	Chera Talo	Independent	1,749	42.39%	628
8	Nyapin-Palin	55.92%	Tadar Tang	INC(I)	2,362	49.6%	Tadar Taniang	PPA	2,086	43.81%	276
9	Doimukh–Sagalee	71.59%	Techi Takar	INC(I)	4,225	51.97%	Khoda Tana	PPA	3,904	48.03%	321
10	Ziro–Hapoli	58.65%	Padi Yubbe	Independent	2,231	26.92%	Gyati Takka	PPA	2,179	26.29%	52
11	Riga-Tali	56.28%	Boa Tamo	PPA	2,983	61.57%	Kabak Mem	INC(I)	1,015	20.95%	1,968
12	Daporijo	83.02%	Tadak Dulom	INC(I)	5,077	58.04%	Kebom Nguba	PPA	3,646	41.68%	1,431
13	Daksing-Taliha	71.01%	Punji Mara	INC(I)	3,292	55.86%	Tara Payeng	PPA	2,601	44.14%	691
14	Mechuka	79.65%	Pasang Wangchuk Sona	Independent	1,541	41.15%	Tadik Chije	INC(I)	1,159	30.95%	382
15	Along North	74.45%	Talong Taggu	INC(I)	3,311	51.19%	Lijum Ronya	PPA	3,157	48.81%	154
16	Along South	75.8%	Tumpakete	PPA	3,602	51.58%	Boken Ette	INC(I)	2,077	29.74%	1,525
17	Basar	86.3%	Tomo Riba	PPA	3,913	51.49%	Todak Basar	INC(I)	3,511	46.2%	402
18	Pasighat	77.17%	Talo Kadu	PPA	5,603	63.41%	Talom Rukbo	INC(I)	3,233	36.59%	2,370
19	Yingkiong–Pangin	75.92%	Geogong Apang	INC(I)	4,799	56.57%	Bani Danggen	PPA	2,184	25.74%	2,615
20	Meriang-Mebo	72.94%	Onyok Rome	PPA	4,191	62.53%	Kabang Borang	INC(I)	2,511	37.47%	1,680
21	Anini	47.53%	Tade Tacho	Independent	1,177	62.41%	Ita Pulu	Independent	709	37.59%	468
22	Roing	85.86%	Aken Lego	PPA	2,260	50.35%	Mutchu Mithi	Independent	1,285	28.63%	975
23	Nomsai–Chowkham	77.47%	Chau Khouk Manpoong	PPA	6,089	52.99%	Chow Tewa Mien	INC(I)	5,402	47.01%	687
24	Tezu Hayuliang	72.45%	Khaprise Krong	INC(I)	5,497	66.87%	Yiasang Mihim	PPA	1,533	18.65%	3,964
25	Noadehing–Nampong	78.35%	Samchom Ngemu	INC(I)	2,538	54.32%	Nongtu Lungphi	PPA	1,419	30.37%	1,119
26	Changlang	78.88%	Tengam Ngemu	INC(I)	2,018	44.72%	Khongman	PPA	1,708	37.85%	310
27	Khonsa South	66.36%	T. L. Rajkumar	INC(I)	2,806	56.92%	Sijen Kong Kang	PPA	1,737	35.23%	1,069
28	Khonsa North	72.3%	Wanglat Lowangcha	PPA	2,685	47.75%	Nokmey Namati	INC(U)	1,996	35.5%	689
29	Niausa–Kanubari	-	Wanghlu Wangshu	PPA	Elected Unopposed						
30	Pongchau-Wakka	26.98%	Hejam Ponglaham	INC(I)	1,136	57.96%	Atem Biham	PPA	297	15.15%	839
