= Seppa Assembly constituency =

Constituency of the Arunachal Pradesh legislative assembly in India

Seppa
- Former constituency for the Arunachal Pradesh Legislative Assembly

Constituency details
- Country: India
- Region: Northeast India
- State: Arunachal Pradesh
- Established: 1978
- Abolished: 1984
- Total electors: 13,793

Seppa Assembly constituency was an assembly constituency in the India state of Arunachal Pradesh. After delimitation it was split into Seppa East Assembly constituency and Seppa West Assembly constituency.

== Members of the Legislative Assembly ==
Election	Member	Party
1978	Donglo Sonam	Janata Party
1980	Nyari Welly	People's Party of Arunachal
1984	Nyari Welly	Indian National Congress

== Election results ==
=== Assembly Election 1984 ===
1984 Arunachal Pradesh Legislative Assembly election : Seppa
Party	Candidate	Votes	%	±%
INC	Nyari Welly	3,419	35.35%	New
Independent	Mape Dada	3,376	34.90%	New
PPA	Sishu Natung	1,412	14.60%	▼28.68
Independent	Gaging Doka	1,202	12.43%	New
Independent	Lukup Sono Yangfo	264	2.73%	New
Margin of victory		43	0.44%	▼6.90
Turnout		9,673	76.19%	▲15.93
Registered electors		13,793		▲14.86
INC gain from PPA		Swing	▼7.93	

=== Assembly Election 1980 ===
1980 Arunachal Pradesh Legislative Assembly election : Seppa
Party	Candidate	Votes	%	±%
PPA	Nyari Welly	2,817	43.28%	▲17.84
INC(I)	Modi Sengi	2,339	35.93%	New
INC(U)	Goumseng Rimo	1,353	20.79%	New
Margin of victory		478	7.34%	▼32.50
Turnout		6,509	57.09%	▼5.65
Registered electors		12,009		▲10.88
PPA gain from JP		Swing	▼22.00	

=== Assembly Election 1978 ===
1978 Arunachal Pradesh Legislative Assembly election : Seppa
Party	Candidate	Votes	%	±%
JP	Donglo Sonam	4,232	65.28%	New
PPA	Nyari Welly	1,649	25.44%	New
Independent	Nima Notung	311	4.80%	New
Independent	Sengne Sengde	291	4.49%	New
Margin of victory		2,583	39.84%	
Turnout		6,483	62.06%	
Registered electors		10,831		
JP win (new seat)				
