= Khonsa South Assembly constituency =

Constituency of the Arunachal Pradesh legislative assembly in India

Khonsa South
- Former constituency for the Arunachal Pradesh Legislative Assembly

Constituency details
- Country: India
- Region: Northeast India
- State: Arunachal Pradesh
- Established: 1978
- Abolished: 1984
- Total electors: 8,392

Khonsa South Assembly constituency was an assembly constituency in the India state of Arunachal Pradesh.

== Members of the Legislative Assembly ==
Election	Member	Party
1978	Sijen Kongkang	People's Party of Arunachal
1980	T. L. Rajkumar	Indian National Congress
1984	T. L. Rajkumar	Indian National Congress

== Election results ==
=== Assembly Election 1984 ===
1984 Arunachal Pradesh Legislative Assembly election : Khonsa South
Party	Candidate	Votes	%	±%
INC	T. L. Rajkumar	2,656	42.67%	New
PPA	Sijen Kongkang	1,478	23.75%	▼11.49
Independent	Hangliam Sumnyam	1,098	17.64%	New
Independent	Khonnyuak	992	15.94%	New
Margin of victory		1,178	18.93%	▼2.76
Turnout		6,224	79.92%	▲11.06
Registered electors		8,392		▲7.42
INC gain from INC(I)		Swing	▼14.24	

=== Assembly Election 1980 ===
1980 Arunachal Pradesh Legislative Assembly election : Khonsa South
Party	Candidate	Votes	%	±%
INC(I)	T. L. Rajkumar	2,806	56.92%	New
PPA	Sijen Kong Kang	1,737	35.23%	▼1.33
Independent	Wanglin	387	7.85%	New
Margin of victory		1,069	21.68%	▲17.93
Turnout		4,930	66.36%	▼8.83
Registered electors		7,812		▲0.98
INC(I) gain from PPA		Swing	▲20.35	

=== Assembly Election 1978 ===
1978 Arunachal Pradesh Legislative Assembly election : Khonsa South
Party	Candidate	Votes	%	±%
PPA	Sijen Kongkang	2,035	36.57%	New
JP	Wangpha Lowang	1,826	32.81%	New
Independent	T. L. Rajkumar	1,704	30.62%	New
Margin of victory		209	3.76%	
Turnout		5,565	75.98%	
Registered electors		7,736		
PPA win (new seat)				
