= Mechuka Assembly constituency =

Constituency of the Arunachal Pradesh legislative assembly in India

Coordinates: 28.600°N 94.135°E

Mechuka
- Constituency No. 33 for the Arunachal Pradesh Legislative Assembly

Constituency details
- Country: India
- Region: Northeast India
- State: Arunachal Pradesh
- District: Shi Yomi
- Lok Sabha constituency: Arunachal East
- Established: 1978
- Total electors: 11,000
- Reservation: ST

Member of Legislative Assembly
- 11th Arunachal Pradesh Legislative Assembly
- Incumbent Pasang Dorjee Sona
- Party: Bharatiya Janata Party
- Elected year: 2024

Mechuka is one of the 60 assembly constituencies of Arunachal Pradesh, a northeastern state of India. It is part of Arunachal East Lok Sabha constituency.

== Members of the Legislative Assembly ==
Year	Member	Party
1978	Tadik Chije	Independent politician
1980	Pasang Wangchuk Sona	Independent politician
1984	Tadik Chije	Independent politician
1990	Pasang Wangchuk Sona	Independent politician
1995	Pasang Wangchuk Sona	Indian National Congress
1999	Tadik Chije	Indian National Congress
2004	Tadik Chije	Indian National Congress
2009	Pasang Dorjee Sona	Indian National Congress
2014	Pasang Dorjee Sona	People's Party of Arunachal
2019	Pasang Dorjee Sona	Bharatiya Janata Party
2024	Pasang Dorjee Sona	Bharatiya Janata Party

== Election results ==
=== Assembly Election 2024 ===
2024 Arunachal Pradesh Legislative Assembly election : Mechuka
Party	Candidate	Votes	%	±%
BJP	Pasang Dorjee Sona	6,320	62.42%	▲12.23
NCP	Aju Chije	3,762	37.16%	New
NOTA	None of the Above	43	0.42%	▲0.01
Margin of victory		2,558	25.26%	▲24.46
Turnout		10,125	92.05%	▲2.70
Registered electors		11,000		▲15.78
BJP hold		Swing	▲12.23	

=== Assembly Election 2019 ===
2019 Arunachal Pradesh Legislative Assembly election : Mechuka
Party	Candidate	Votes	%	±%
BJP	Pasang Dorjee Sona	4,261	50.19%	▲47.19
NPP	Tori Ragyor	4,193	49.39%	New
NOTA	None of the Above	35	0.41%	▲0.15
Margin of victory		68	0.80%	▲0.22
Turnout		8,489	89.35%	▲4.44
Registered electors		9,501		▲1.83
BJP gain from PPA		Swing	▲1.91	

=== Assembly Election 2014 ===
2014 Arunachal Pradesh Legislative Assembly election : Mechuka
Party	Candidate	Votes	%	±%
PPA	Pasang Dorjee Sona	3,825	48.28%	▲33.00
INC	Tori Ragyor	3,779	47.70%	▼3.97
BJP	Maung Koje	238	3.00%	New
NPF	Bote Yuto	59	0.74%	New
NOTA	None of the Above	21	0.27%	New
Margin of victory		46	0.58%	▼19.58
Turnout		7,922	84.91%	▼0.02
Registered electors		9,330		▲3.06
PPA gain from INC		Swing	▼3.39	

=== Assembly Election 2009 ===
2009 Arunachal Pradesh Legislative Assembly election : Mechuka
Party	Candidate	Votes	%	±%
INC	Pasang Dorjee Sona	3,973	51.67%	▼3.41
NCP	Tsering Naksang	2,423	31.51%	New
PPA	Bote Yuto	1,175	15.28%	New
AITC	Tako Puning	118	1.53%	New
Margin of victory		1,550	20.16%	▲10.00
Turnout		7,689	84.93%	▲5.23
Registered electors		9,053		▲8.01
INC hold		Swing	▼3.41	

=== Assembly Election 2004 ===
2004 Arunachal Pradesh Legislative Assembly election : Mechuka
Party	Candidate	Votes	%	±%
INC	Tadik Chije	3,680	55.08%	▼8.49
Independent	Pasang Wangchuk Sona	3,001	44.92%	New
Margin of victory		679	10.16%	▼16.99
Turnout		6,681	79.71%	▼5.48
Registered electors		8,382		▲19.74
INC hold		Swing		

=== Assembly Election 1999 ===
1999 Arunachal Pradesh Legislative Assembly election : Mechuka
Party	Candidate	Votes	%	±%
INC	Tadik Chije	3,791	63.58%	▲23.76
AC	Pasang Wangchuk Sona	2,172	36.42%	New
Margin of victory		1,619	27.15%	▲22.59
Turnout		5,963	86.47%	▼4.77
Registered electors		7,000		▲36.03
INC hold		Swing		

=== Assembly Election 1995 ===
1995 Arunachal Pradesh Legislative Assembly election : Mechuka
Party	Candidate	Votes	%	±%
INC	Pasang Wangchuk Sona	1,843	39.81%	New
JD	Tadik Chije	1,632	35.26%	New
Independent	Tanya Mosing	1,154	24.93%	New
Margin of victory		211	4.56%	▼1.20
Turnout		4,629	91.35%	▲6.88
Registered electors		5,146		▼8.81
INC gain from Independent		Swing		

=== Assembly Election 1990 ===
1990 Arunachal Pradesh Legislative Assembly election : Mechuka
Party	Candidate	Votes	%	±%
Independent	Pasang Wangchuk Sona	2,395	51.09%	New
Independent	Tadik Chije	2,125	45.33%	New
Independent	Tako Koje	168	3.58%	New
Margin of victory		270	5.76%	▲1.41
Turnout		4,688	84.23%	▲6.15
Registered electors		5,643		▲3.67
Independent hold		Swing		

=== Assembly Election 1984 ===
1984 Arunachal Pradesh Legislative Assembly election : Mechuka
Party	Candidate	Votes	%	±%
Independent	Tadik Chije	1,492	35.63%	New
INC	Pasang Wangchuk Sona	1,310	31.29%	New
Independent	Tasi Gaduk	720	17.20%	New
Independent	Tanya Mosing	422	10.08%	New
Independent	Tapik Rinya	243	5.80%	New
Margin of victory		182	4.35%	▼5.85
Turnout		4,187	80.76%	▼0.31
Registered electors		5,443		▲12.25
Independent hold		Swing	▼5.51	

=== Assembly Election 1980 ===
1980 Arunachal Pradesh Legislative Assembly election : Mechuka
Party	Candidate	Votes	%	±%
Independent	Pasang Wangchuk Sona	1,541	41.15%	New
INC(I)	Tadik Chije	1,159	30.95%	New
PPA	Tapik Rinya	847	22.62%	▼5.48
INC(U)	Lamey Pusang	198	5.29%	New
Margin of victory		382	10.20%	▼9.49
Turnout		3,745	79.65%	▼4.99
Registered electors		4,849		▲0.12
Independent hold		Swing	▼6.64	

=== Assembly Election 1978 ===
1978 Arunachal Pradesh Legislative Assembly election : Mechuka
Party	Candidate	Votes	%	±%
Independent	Tadik Chije	1,903	47.79%	New
PPA	Tapik Rinya	1,119	28.10%	New
JP	Pasnag Wangchuk Sona	960	24.11%	New
Margin of victory		784	19.69%	
Turnout		3,982	84.80%	
Registered electors		4,843		
Independent win (new seat)				

== See also ==
- Mechuka
- Shi Yomi district
- List of constituencies of Arunachal Pradesh Legislative Assembly
