= Khonsa North Assembly constituency =

Constituency of the Arunachal Pradesh legislative assembly in India

Khonsa North
- Former constituency for the Arunachal Pradesh Legislative Assembly

Constituency details
- Country: India
- Region: Northeast India
- State: Arunachal Pradesh
- Established: 1978
- Abolished: 1984
- Total electors: 9,581

Khonsa North Assembly constituency was an assembly constituency in the India state of Arunachal Pradesh.

== Members of the Legislative Assembly ==
Election	Member	Party
1978	Nokmey Namati	Janata Party
1980	Wanglat Lowangcha	People's Party of Arunachal
1984	Kapchen Rajkumar	Indian National Congress

== Election results ==
=== Assembly Election 1984 ===
1984 Arunachal Pradesh Legislative Assembly election : Khonsa North
Party	Candidate	Votes	%	±%
INC	Kapchen Rajkumar	2,284	33.59%	New
Independent	Wanglat Lowangcha	1,786	26.26%	New
Independent	W. Ajoy Rajkumar	1,480	21.76%	New
Independent	Nokmey Namati	1,132	16.65%	New
Independent	Rohang Ramra	118	1.74%	New
Margin of victory		498	7.32%	▼4.93
Turnout		6,800	74.54%	▲1.17
Registered electors		9,581		▲18.94
INC gain from PPA		Swing	▼14.16	

=== Assembly Election 1980 ===
1980 Arunachal Pradesh Legislative Assembly election : Khonsa North
Party	Candidate	Votes	%	±%
PPA	Wanglat Lowangcha	2,685	47.75%	▲20.23
INC(U)	Nokmey Namati	1,996	35.50%	New
INC(I)	Tonhang Tongluk	820	14.58%	New
Independent	Rohang Ramra	122	2.17%	New
Margin of victory		689	12.25%	▲3.12
Turnout		5,623	72.30%	▼2.17
Registered electors		8,055		▲13.88
PPA gain from JP		Swing	▲11.10	

=== Assembly Election 1978 ===
1978 Arunachal Pradesh Legislative Assembly election : Khonsa North
Party	Candidate	Votes	%	±%
JP	Nokmey Namati	1,866	36.65%	New
PPA	Wanglat Lowangcha	1,401	27.52%	New
Independent	Ngongbey Kanglom	1,029	20.21%	New
Independent	Tesa Tangjang	795	15.62%	New
Margin of victory		465	9.13%	
Turnout		5,091	74.52%	
Registered electors		7,073		
JP win (new seat)				
