= Nyari Welly =

Indian politician

Member of the Arunachal Pradesh Legislative Assembly from Seppa constituency
- In office 1980–1988

Personal details
- Born: 2 October 1945 Beyong village, Seppa Sub-Division
- Died: 21 October 1988 (aged 43)
- Party: People's Party of Arunachal, Indian National Congress

Nyari Welly (2 October 1945 – 21 October 1988) was an Indian politician. She was the first woman elected to the Arunachal Pradesh Legislative Assembly.

== Social activist ==
Welly was born in Beyong village, Seppa Sub-Division, Kameng District, and did not have any formal education. Before joining politics she was a social activist. She served as president of the Women Welfare Centre, Seppa Branch between 1970 and 1974. In 1976 she worked as Lady Organiser of the Seppa branch of the Congress Sevadal.

== 1978 election ==
Welly was one of two female candidates in the fray in the 1978 Arunachal Pradesh Legislative Assembly election (out of a total of 86 candidates). She stood as the People's Party of Arunachal candidate in the Seppa constituency. She finished in second place, with 1,649 votes (25.44% of the votes in the constituency).

== 1980 election ==
She again contested the Seppa seat in the 1980 Arunachal Pradesh Legislative Assembly election. She stood as a PPA candidate. She won the seat, obtaining 2,817 votes (43.28%) and becoming the first elected female Member of the Legislative Assembly in the state. However, she wasn't the first woman to sit in the Assembly as Sibo Kai had been a nominated member of the 1978 Assembly. Welly defeated Modi Sengi from the Indian National Congress (Indira) and Goumseng Rino from the Indian National Congress (Urs). Welly's election victory was attributed to the influence of her husband, who was a powerful man in the area.

In the Assembly Welly confronted issues like child marriage, polygamy and bride price. When she brought a Bill to outlaw these practices, male members of the Assembly protested loudly.

== 1984 election ==
Welly retained the Seppa seat in the 1984 Arunachal Pradesh Legislative Assembly election. This time she stood as an Indian National Congress candidate. She obtained 3,419 votes (35.35%), narrowly defeating the independent candidate Mape Dada by a margin of 43 votes. In the 1984 election a second woman was elected to the Assembly, Kamoli Mossang from the Noadihing Nampong constituency.

== Personal life ==
Welly belonged to the Nyishi. She was the mother of Atum Welly, who as of 2013 served as Health and Family Minister in the Arunachal Pradesh state government. Her main hobbies were gardening and knitting.
