= Tawang-I Assembly constituency =

Constituency of the Arunachal Pradesh legislative assembly in India

Tawang-I
- Former constituency for the Arunachal Pradesh Legislative Assembly

Constituency details
- Country: India
- Region: Northeast India
- State: Arunachal Pradesh
- Established: 1978
- Abolished: 1984
- Total electors: 6,059

Tawang-1 was an assembly constituency in the India state of Arunachal Pradesh.

== Members of the Legislative Assembly ==
Election	Member	Party
1978	Karma Wangchu	Independent politician
1980	Karma Wangchu	People's Party of Arunachal
1984	Karma Wangchu	Indian National Congress

== Election results ==
=== Assembly Election 1984 ===
1984 Arunachal Pradesh Legislative Assembly election : Tawang-I
Party	Candidate	Votes	%	±%
INC	Karma Wangchu	2,992	65.16%	New
PPA	Tashi Norbu	1,600	34.84%	▼34.79
Margin of victory		1,392	30.31%	▼8.96
Turnout		4,592	80.62%	▲8.75
Registered electors		6,059		▲10.71
INC gain from PPA		Swing	▼4.48	

=== Assembly Election 1980 ===
1980 Arunachal Pradesh Legislative Assembly election : Tawang-I
Party	Candidate	Votes	%	±%
PPA	Karma Wangchu	2,555	69.64%	New
INC(I)	Pem Gombu	1,114	30.36%	New
Margin of victory		1,441	39.28%	▲8.93
Turnout		3,669	71.33%	▼4.51
Registered electors		5,473		▲10.34
PPA gain from Independent		Swing	▲4.46	

=== Assembly Election 1978 ===
1978 Arunachal Pradesh Legislative Assembly election : Tawang-I
Party	Candidate	Votes	%	±%
Independent	Karma Wangchu	2,313	65.17%	New
JP	Tashi Lama	1,236	34.83%	New
Margin of victory		1,077	30.35%	
Turnout		3,549	74.50%	
Registered electors		4,960		
Independent win (new seat)				
