= Meriang–Mebo Assembly constituency =

Constituency of the Arunachal Pradesh legislative assembly in India

Meriang–Mebo
- Former constituency for the Arunachal Pradesh Legislative Assembly

Constituency details
- Country: India
- Region: Northeast India
- State: Arunachal Pradesh
- Established: 1978
- Abolished: 1984
- Total electors: 10,498

Meriang–Mebo was an assembly constituency in the India state of Arunachal Pradesh.

== Members of the Legislative Assembly ==
Election	Member	Party
1978	Onyok Rome	People's Party of Arunachal
1980	Onyok Rome	People's Party of Arunachal
1984	Bakin Pertin	People's Party of Arunachal

== Election results ==
=== Assembly Election 1984 ===
1984 Arunachal Pradesh Legislative Assembly election : Meriang-Mebo
Party	Candidate	Votes	%	±%
PPA	Bakin Pertin	4,167	51.42%	▼11.11
INC	Kabang Borang	3,937	48.58%	New
Margin of victory		230	2.84%	▼22.23
Turnout		8,104	80.46%	▲6.91
Registered electors		10,498		▲10.09
PPA hold		Swing	▼11.11	

=== Assembly Election 1980 ===
1980 Arunachal Pradesh Legislative Assembly election : Meriang-Mebo
Party	Candidate	Votes	%	±%
PPA	Onyok Rome	4,191	62.53%	▲2.59
INC(I)	Kabang Borang	2,511	37.47%	New
Margin of victory		1,680	25.07%	▼9.28
Turnout		6,702	72.94%	▼1.81
Registered electors		9,536		▲10.86
PPA hold		Swing	▲2.59	

=== Assembly Election 1978 ===
1978 Arunachal Pradesh Legislative Assembly election : Meriang-Mebo
Party	Candidate	Votes	%	±%
PPA	Onyok Rome	3,717	59.94%	New
Independent	Kabang Borang	1,587	25.59%	New
Independent	Mamil Tayeng	897	14.47%	New
Margin of victory		2,130	34.35%	
Turnout		6,201	74.96%	
Registered electors		8,602		
PPA win (new seat)				
