= Nomsai–Chowkham Assembly constituency =

Constituency of the Arunachal Pradesh legislative assembly in India

Nomsai–Chowkham
- Former constituency for the Arunachal Pradesh Legislative Assembly

Constituency details
- Country: India
- Region: Northeast India
- State: Arunachal Pradesh
- Established: 1978
- Abolished: 1984
- Total electors: 18,772

Nomsai–Chowkham Assembly constituency was an assembly constituency in the India state of Arunachal Pradesh.

== Members of the Legislative Assembly ==
| Election | Member | Party |
|---|---|---|
| 1978 | Chow Tewa Mien | Janata Party |
| 1980 | Chau Khouk Manpoong | People's Party of Arunachal |
| 1984 | C. P. Namshoom | Independent politician |

== Election results ==
=== Assembly Election 1984 ===
1984 Arunachal Pradesh Legislative Assembly election : Nomsai–Chowkham
| Party | Candidate | Votes | % | ±% |
|---|---|---|---|---|
| Independent | C. P. Namshoom | 5,816 | 43.71% | New |
| INC | Chau Khouk Manpoong | 5,634 | 42.34% | New |
| Independent | Sinai | 1,347 | 10.12% | New |
| Independent | G. C. Deori Lapfroo | 509 | 3.83% | New |
| Margin of victory | | 182 | 1.37% | ▼4.61 |
| Turnout | | 13,306 | 75.67% | ▼2.36 |
| Registered electors | | 18,772 | | ▲19.65 |
| Independent gain from PPA | | Swing | ▼9.28 | |

=== Assembly Election 1980 ===
1980 Arunachal Pradesh Legislative Assembly election : Nomsai–Chowkham
| Party | Candidate | Votes | % | ±% |
|---|---|---|---|---|
| PPA | Chau Khouk Manpoong | 6,089 | 52.99% | ▲24.92 |
| INC(I) | Chow Tewa Mien | 5,402 | 47.01% | New |
| Margin of victory | | 687 | 5.98% | ▼7.95 |
| Turnout | | 11,491 | 77.47% | ▼4.68 |
| Registered electors | | 15,689 | | ▲13.03 |
| PPA gain from JP | | Swing | ▲11.00 | |

=== Assembly Election 1978 ===
1978 Arunachal Pradesh Legislative Assembly election : Nomsai–Chowkham
| Party | Candidate | Votes | % | ±% |
|---|---|---|---|---|
| JP | Chow Tewa Mien | 4,542 | 41.99% | New |
| PPA | Chau Khouk Manpoong | 3,036 | 28.07% | New |
| Independent | Omam Deori | 2,781 | 25.71% | New |
| Independent | C. A. Gohain | 457 | 4.23% | New |
| Margin of victory | | 1,506 | 13.92% | |
| Turnout | | 10,816 | 81.72% | |
| Registered electors | | 13,880 | | |
| JP win (new seat) | | | | |
