= Tawang-II Assembly constituency =

Constituency of the Arunachal Pradesh legislative assembly in India

Tawang-Ii
- Former constituency for the Arunachal Pradesh Legislative Assembly

Constituency details
- Country: India
- Region: Northeast India
- State: Arunachal Pradesh
- Established: 1978
- Abolished: 1984
- Total electors: 6,421

Tawang-2 was an assembly constituency in the India state of Arunachal Pradesh.

== Members of the Legislative Assembly ==
Election	Member	Party
1978	Tashi Khandu	Independent politician
1980	Tsering Tashi	People's Party of Arunachal
1984	Tsering Tashi	Indian National Congress

== Election results ==
=== Assembly Election 1984 ===
1984 Arunachal Pradesh Legislative Assembly election : Tawang-II
Party	Candidate	Votes	%	±%
INC	Tsering Tashi	3,139	64.35%	New
PPA	Tsering Chuki	1,739	35.65%	▼12.52
Margin of victory		1,400	28.70%	▲28.35
Turnout		4,878	80.13%	▼0.52
Registered electors		6,421		▲24.53
INC gain from PPA		Swing	▲16.18	

=== Assembly Election 1980 ===
1980 Arunachal Pradesh Legislative Assembly election : Tawang-II
Party	Candidate	Votes	%	±%
PPA	Tsering Tashi	1,900	48.17%	New
INC(I)	Tashi Khandu	1,886	47.82%	New
Independent	Pema Droga	158	4.01%	New
Margin of victory		14	0.35%	▼6.43
Turnout		3,944	81.59%	▲1.01
Registered electors		5,156		▲10.88
PPA gain from Independent		Swing	▼5.22	

=== Assembly Election 1978 ===
1978 Arunachal Pradesh Legislative Assembly election : Tawang-II
Party	Candidate	Votes	%	±%
Independent	Tashi Khandu	1,874	53.39%	New
JP	Tsering Tashi	1,636	46.61%	New
Margin of victory		238	6.78%	
Turnout		3,510	76.92%	
Registered electors		4,650		
Independent win (new seat)				
