= Doimukh–Sagalee Assembly constituency =

Constituency of the Arunachal Pradesh legislative assembly in India

Doimukh–Sagalee
- Former constituency No. 9 for the Arunachal Pradesh Legislative Assembly

Constituency details
- Country: India
- Region: Northeast India
- State: Arunachal Pradesh
- Established: 1978
- Abolished: 1989
- Total electors: 19,525 (1984)

Doimukh–Sagalee was an assembly constituency in the India state of Arunachal Pradesh.

== Members of the Legislative Assembly ==
Election	Member	Party
1978	Tara Sinda	Janata Party
1980	Techi Takar	Indian National Congress
1984	Techi Takar	Indian National Congress

== Election results ==
=== Assembly Election 1984 ===
1984 Arunachal Pradesh Legislative Assembly election : Doimukh–Sagalee
Party	Candidate	Votes	%	±%
INC	Techi Takar	5,203	39.97%	New
Independent	Nabam Atum	3,075	23.62%	New
BJP	Techi Toka	2,843	21.84%	New
Independent	Tarin Mallo	848	6.52%	New
JP	Hage Bida	380	2.92%	New
Independent	M. R. Dodum	378	2.90%	New
Independent	O. Dai	289	2.22%	New
Margin of victory		2,128	16.35%	▲12.40
Turnout		13,016	70.93%	▼1.13
Registered electors		19,525		▲62.83
INC gain from INC(I)		Swing	▼12.00	

=== Assembly Election 1980 ===
1980 Arunachal Pradesh Legislative Assembly election : Doimukh–Sagalee
Party	Candidate	Votes	%	±%
INC(I)	Techi Takar	4,225	51.97%	New
PPA	Khoda Tana	3,904	48.03%	▲29.53
Margin of victory		321	3.95%	▼5.60
Turnout		8,129	71.59%	▼11.10
Registered electors		11,991		▲43.57
INC(I) gain from JP		Swing	▲19.36	

=== Assembly Election 1978 ===
1978 Arunachal Pradesh Legislative Assembly election : Doimukh–Sagalee
Party	Candidate	Votes	%	±%
JP	Tara Sinda	2,149	32.61%	New
Independent	Khoda Tana	1,520	23.07%	New
Independent	Tarin Mallo	1,243	18.86%	New
PPA	Buda Tana	1,219	18.50%	New
Independent	Tem Tai	458	6.95%	New
Margin of victory		629	9.55%	
Turnout		6,589	80.72%	
Registered electors		8,352		
JP win (new seat)				
