= Along South Assembly constituency =

Along South
- Former constituency for the Arunachal Pradesh Legislative Assembly

Constituency details
- Country: India
- Region: Northeast India
- State: Arunachal Pradesh
- Established: 1978
- Abolished: 1984
- Total electors: 11,390

Along South Assembly constituencywas an assembly constituency in the India state of Arunachal Pradesh.

== Members of the Legislative Assembly ==
Election	Member	Party
1978	Boken Ette	Independent politician
1980	Tumpakete	People's Party of Arunachal
1984	Doi Ado	People's Party of Arunachal

== Election results ==
=== Assembly Election 1984 ===
1984 Arunachal Pradesh Legislative Assembly election : Along South
Party	Candidate	Votes	%	±%
PPA	Doi Ado	4,523	52.51%	▲0.93
Independent	Boken Ette	3,270	37.96%	New
INC	Kardu Taipodia	821	9.53%	New
Margin of victory		1,253	14.55%	▼7.29
Turnout		8,614	78.09%	▲2.02
Registered electors		11,390		▲20.05
PPA hold		Swing	▲0.93	

=== Assembly Election 1980 ===
1980 Arunachal Pradesh Legislative Assembly election : Along South
Party	Candidate	Votes	%	±%
PPA	Tumpakete	3,602	51.58%	▲36.80
INC(I)	Boken Ette	2,077	29.74%	New
INC(U)	Togum Lollen	1,305	18.69%	New
Margin of victory		1,525	21.84%	▲15.22
Turnout		6,984	75.80%	▼7.34
Registered electors		9,488		▲8.58
PPA gain from Independent		Swing	▲23.69	

=== Assembly Election 1978 ===
1978 Arunachal Pradesh Legislative Assembly election : Along South
Party	Candidate	Votes	%	±%
Independent	Boken Ette	1,972	27.88%	New
JP	Tumpakete	1,504	21.26%	New
Independent	Taken Riba	1,308	18.49%	New
Independent	Togum Lollen	1,244	17.59%	New
PPA	Dagmo Jini	1,045	14.77%	New
Margin of victory		468	6.62%	
Turnout		7,073	82.82%	
Registered electors		8,738		
Independent win (new seat)				
