= Dirang–Kalaktang Assembly constituency =

Constituency of the Arunachal Pradesh legislative assembly in India

Dirang–Kalaktang
- Former constituency for the Arunachal Pradesh Legislative Assembly

Constituency details
- Country: India
- Region: Northeast India
- State: Arunachal Pradesh
- Established: 1978
- Abolished: 1990
- Total electors: 10,284

Dirang–Kalaktang Assembly constituency was an assembly constituency in the India state of Arunachal Pradesh.

== Members of the Legislative Assembly ==
Election	Member	Party
1978	Prem Khandu Thungon	Janata Party
1980	Nima Tsering Rupa	Indian National Congress
1984	R. K. Khrimey	Independent politician

== Election results ==
=== Assembly Election 1984 ===
1984 Arunachal Pradesh Legislative Assembly election : Dirang–Kalaktang
Party	Candidate	Votes	%	±%
Independent	R. K. Khrimey	3,925	49.05%	New
INC	Nima Tsering Khrime	3,444	43.04%	New
Independent	Dorjee Tsering	633	7.91%	New
Margin of victory		481	6.01%	▼22.62
Turnout		8,002	81.64%	▲3.25
Registered electors		10,284		▲31.64
Independent gain from INC(I)		Swing	▼5.35	

=== Assembly Election 1980 ===
1980 Arunachal Pradesh Legislative Assembly election : Dirang–Kalaktang
Party	Candidate	Votes	%	±%
INC(I)	Nima Tsering Rupa	3,169	54.40%	New
INC(U)	Dorjee Tsering Samphung	1,501	25.77%	New
Independent	Lei Kunju Dirang	895	15.36%	New
Independent	Lobsang Tsering Dirang	142	2.44%	New
PPA	Dorjee Tseringh Bomdila	118	2.03%	New
Margin of victory		1,668	28.64%	
Turnout		5,825	78.92%	▲74.56
Registered electors		7,812		▲8.02
INC(I) gain from JP		Swing		

=== Assembly Election 1978 ===
1978 Arunachal Pradesh Legislative Assembly election : Dirang–Kalaktang
Party	Candidate	Votes	%	±%
JP	Prem Khandu Thungon	Unopposed		
Registered electors		7,232		
JP win (new seat)				
