= Nyapin–Palin Assembly constituency =

Constituency of the Arunachal Pradesh legislative assembly in India

Nyapin–Palin
- Former constituency for the Arunachal Pradesh Legislative Assembly

Constituency details
- Country: India
- Region: Northeast India
- State: Arunachal Pradesh
- Established: 1978
- Abolished: 1984
- Total electors: 10,795

Nyapin–Palin or Nyapin–Palim was an assembly constituency in the India state of Arunachal Pradesh.

== Members of the Legislative Assembly ==
Election	Member	Party
1978	Tadar Tang	Janata Party
1980	Tadar Tang	Indian National Congress
1984	Tadar Tang	Indian National Congress

== Election results ==
=== Assembly Election 1984 ===
1984 Arunachal Pradesh Legislative Assembly election : Nyapin-Palin
Party	Candidate	Votes	%	±%
INC	Tadar Tang	3,265	41.05%	New
PPA	Kamen Ringu	2,836	35.66%	▼8.15
Independent	Dozang Taging	1,371	17.24%	New
Independent	Tai Punung	380	4.78%	New
JP	Takio Sonia	101	1.27%	New
Margin of victory		429	5.39%	▼0.40
Turnout		7,953	80.08%	▲21.82
Registered electors		10,795		▲17.54
INC gain from INC(I)		Swing	▼8.55	

=== Assembly Election 1980 ===
1980 Arunachal Pradesh Legislative Assembly election : Nyapin-Palin
Party	Candidate	Votes	%	±%
INC(I)	Tadar Tang	2,362	49.60%	New
PPA	Tadar Taniang	2,086	43.81%	▲23.66
INC(U)	Techi Tuku	314	6.59%	New
Margin of victory		276	5.80%	▼53.92
Turnout		4,762	55.92%	▼4.88
Registered electors		9,184		▲5.04
INC(I) gain from JP		Swing	▼30.26	

=== Assembly Election 1978 ===
1978 Arunachal Pradesh Legislative Assembly election : Nyapin-Palin
Party	Candidate	Votes	%	±%
JP	Tadar Tang	3,961	79.86%	New
PPA	Tadar Taniang	999	20.14%	New
Margin of victory		2,962	59.72%	
Turnout		4,960	59.28%	
Registered electors		8,743		
JP win (new seat)				
