= Noadehing–Nampong Assembly constituency =

Constituency of the Arunachal Pradesh legislative assembly in India

Noadehing–Nampong
- Former constituency for the Arunachal Pradesh Legislative Assembly

Constituency details
- Country: India
- Region: Northeast India
- State: Arunachal Pradesh
- Established: 1978
- Abolished: 1984
- Total electors: 8,426

Noadehing–Nampong Assembly constituency was an assembly constituency in the India state of Arunachal Pradesh.

== Members of the Legislative Assembly ==
Election	Member	Party
1978	Jungpum Jugli	People's Party of Arunachal
1980	Samchom Ngemu	Indian National Congress
1984	Kamoli Mossang	Independent politician

== Election results ==
=== Assembly Election 1984 ===
1984 Arunachal Pradesh Legislative Assembly election : Noadehing–Nampong
Party	Candidate	Votes	%	±%
Independent	Kamoli Mossang	2,937	48.99%	New
INC	Samchom Ngemu	2,682	44.74%	New
Independent	Yan Tikhak	216	3.60%	New
Independent	Komkoi Taisam Lungchang	160	2.67%	New
Margin of victory		255	4.25%	▼19.70
Turnout		5,995	74.21%	▼4.23
Registered electors		8,426		▲35.95
Independent gain from INC(I)		Swing	▼5.33	

=== Assembly Election 1980 ===
1980 Arunachal Pradesh Legislative Assembly election : Noadehing–Nampong
Party	Candidate	Votes	%	±%
INC(I)	Samchom Ngemu	2,538	54.32%	New
PPA	Nongtu Lungphi	1,419	30.37%	▼4.21
Independent	Samhong Rekhung	572	12.24%	New
INC(U)	Komkoi Taisam Lungchang	143	3.06%	New
Margin of victory		1,119	23.95%	▲16.89
Turnout		4,672	78.35%	▲1.55
Registered electors		6,198		▲30.90
INC(I) gain from PPA		Swing	▲19.74	

=== Assembly Election 1978 ===
1978 Arunachal Pradesh Legislative Assembly election : Noadehing–Nampong
Party	Candidate	Votes	%	±%
PPA	Jungpum Jugli	1,209	34.58%	New
Independent	Samchom Ngemu	962	27.52%	New
JP	Puyog Tikhar	893	25.54%	New
Independent	Komkoi Taisam Lungchang	432	12.36%	New
Margin of victory		247	7.07%	
Turnout		3,496	76.22%	
Registered electors		4,735		
PPA win (new seat)				
