= Changlang Assembly constituency =

Constituency of the Arunachal Pradesh legislative assembly in India

Changlang
- Former constituency for the Arunachal Pradesh Legislative Assembly

Constituency details
- Country: India
- Region: Northeast India
- State: Arunachal Pradesh
- Established: 1978
- Abolished: 1984
- Total electors: 7,432

Changlang Assembly constituency was an assembly constituency in the India state of Arunachal Pradesh. After delimitation, it was divided into two new constituencies: Changlang South Assembly constituency and Changlang North Assembly constituency.

== Members of the Legislative Assembly ==
Election	Member	Party
1978	Tengam Ngemu	Janata Party
1980	Tengam Ngemu	Indian National Congress
1984	Tengam Ngemu	Indian National Congress

== Election results ==
=== Assembly Election 1984 ===
1984 Arunachal Pradesh Legislative Assembly election : Changlang
Party	Candidate	Votes	%	±%
INC	Tengam Ngemu	3,055	53.05%	New
Independent	Wangnia Pongte	2,573	44.68%	New
Independent	Jungpom Jugli	131	2.27%	New
Margin of victory		482	8.37%	▲1.50
Turnout		5,759	80.99%	▲1.37
Registered electors		7,432		▲25.35
INC gain from INC(I)		Swing	▲8.33	

=== Assembly Election 1980 ===
1980 Arunachal Pradesh Legislative Assembly election : Changlang
Party	Candidate	Votes	%	±%
INC(I)	Tengam Ngemu	2,018	44.72%	New
PPA	Khongman	1,708	37.85%	▼0.21
Independent	Lunpong	558	12.36%	New
INC(U)	Jungpom Jugli	229	5.07%	New
Margin of victory		310	6.87%	▼5.89
Turnout		4,513	78.88%	▲2.08
Registered electors		5,929		▲1.68
INC(I) gain from JP		Swing	▼6.11	

=== Assembly Election 1978 ===
1978 Arunachal Pradesh Legislative Assembly election : Changlang
Party	Candidate	Votes	%	±%
JP	Tengam Ngemu	2,194	50.82%	New
PPA	Nongcho	1,643	38.06%	New
Independent	Samhong	480	11.12%	New
Margin of victory		551	12.76%	
Turnout		4,317	76.30%	
Registered electors		5,831		
JP win (new seat)				
