= Riga–Tali Assembly constituency =

Constituency of the Arunachal Pradesh legislative assembly in India

Riga-Tali
- Former constituency for the Arunachal Pradesh Legislative Assembly

Constituency details
- Country: India
- Region: Northeast India
- State: Arunachal Pradesh
- Established: 1978
- Abolished: 1984
- Total electors: 10,259

Riga-Tali or Raga-Tali was an assembly constituency in the India state of Arunachal Pradesh.

== Members of the Legislative Assembly ==
Election	Member	Party
1978	Nido Techi	Janata Party
1980	Boa Tamo	People's Party of Arunachal
1984	Boa Tamo	Indian National Congress

== Election results ==
=== Assembly Election 1984 ===
1984 Arunachal Pradesh Legislative Assembly election : Riga-Tali
Party	Candidate	Votes	%	±%
INC	Boa Tamo	1,762	25.54%	New
BJP	Mem Kabak	1,686	24.44%	New
Independent	Nido Techi	1,510	21.89%	New
Independent	Tagrue Tanang	1,053	15.27%	New
Independent	Sorom Tatup	523	7.58%	New
JP	Yora Tanang	364	5.28%	New
Margin of victory		76	1.10%	▼39.52
Turnout		6,898	73.01%	▲15.16
Registered electors		10,259		▲10.26
INC gain from PPA		Swing	▼36.02	

=== Assembly Election 1980 ===
1980 Arunachal Pradesh Legislative Assembly election : Riga-Tali
Party	Candidate	Votes	%	±%
PPA	Boa Tamo	2,983	61.57%	▲16.56
INC(I)	Kabak Mem	1,015	20.95%	New
Independent	Rigic Tada	799	16.49%	New
Independent	Nido Techi	48	0.99%	New
Margin of victory		1,968	40.62%	▲30.63
Turnout		4,845	56.28%	▼22.22
Registered electors		9,304		▲7.41
PPA gain from JP		Swing	▲6.57	

=== Assembly Election 1978 ===
1978 Arunachal Pradesh Legislative Assembly election : Riga-Tali
Party	Candidate	Votes	%	±%
JP	Nido Techi	3,539	55.00%	New
PPA	Boa Tamo	2,896	45.00%	New
Margin of victory		643	9.99%	
Turnout		6,435	76.93%	
Registered electors		8,662		
JP win (new seat)				
