= Along North Assembly constituency =

Along North
- Former constituency for the Arunachal Pradesh Legislative Assembly

Constituency details
- Country: India
- Region: Northeast India
- State: Arunachal Pradesh
- Established: 1978
- Abolished: 1984
- Total electors: 10,903

Along North Assembly constituencywas an assembly constituency in the India state of Arunachal Pradesh.

== Members of the Legislative Assembly ==
Election	Member	Party
1978	Lijum Ronya	People's Party of Arunachal
1980	Talong Taggu	Indian National Congress
1984	Lijum Ronya	Bharatiya Janata Party

== Election results ==
=== Assembly Election 1984 ===
1984 Arunachal Pradesh Legislative Assembly election : Along North
Party	Candidate	Votes	%	±%
BJP	Lijum Ronya	2,811	32.21%	New
INC	Talong Taggu	2,763	31.66%	New
Independent	Tamyo Taga	2,460	28.19%	New
Independent	Doyom Likar	694	7.95%	New
Margin of victory		48	0.55%	▼1.83
Turnout		8,728	82.79%	▲7.42
Registered electors		10,903		▲22.44
BJP gain from INC(I)		Swing	▼18.98	

=== Assembly Election 1980 ===
1980 Arunachal Pradesh Legislative Assembly election : Along North
Party	Candidate	Votes	%	±%
INC(I)	Talong Taggu	3,311	51.19%	New
PPA	Lijum Ronya	3,157	48.81%	▼2.32
Margin of victory		154	2.38%	▼20.61
Turnout		6,468	74.45%	▼7.28
Registered electors		8,905		▲7.21
INC(I) gain from PPA		Swing	▲0.06	

=== Assembly Election 1978 ===
1978 Arunachal Pradesh Legislative Assembly election : Along North
Party	Candidate	Votes	%	±%
PPA	Lijum Ronya	3,394	51.13%	New
Independent	Talong Taggu	1,868	28.14%	New
JP	Nyodek Yonggam	1,376	20.73%	New
Margin of victory		1,526	22.99%	
Turnout		6,638	81.96%	
Registered electors		8,306		
PPA win (new seat)				
