= Yingkiong–Pangin Assembly constituency =

Constituency of the Arunachal Pradesh legislative assembly in India

Yingkiong–Pangin
- Former constituency for the Arunachal Pradesh Legislative Assembly

Constituency details
- Country: India
- Region: Northeast India
- State: Arunachal Pradesh
- Established: 1978
- Abolished: 1984
- Total electors: 13,389

Yingkiong–Pangin Assembly constituency was an assembly constituency in the India state of Arunachal Pradesh.

== Members of the Legislative Assembly ==
Election	Member	Party
1978	Gegong Apang	Janata Party
1980	Gegong Apang	Indian National Congress
1984	Gegong Apang	Indian National Congress

== Election results ==
=== Assembly Election 1984 ===
1984 Arunachal Pradesh Legislative Assembly election : Yingkiong–Pangin
Party	Candidate	Votes	%	±%
INC	Geogong Apang	6,880	66.22%	New
PPA	Tanung Mize	3,510	33.78%	▲8.04
Margin of victory		3,370	32.44%	▲1.61
Turnout		10,390	79.86%	▲5.00
Registered electors		13,389		▲14.58
INC gain from INC(I)		Swing	▲9.65	

=== Assembly Election 1980 ===
1980 Arunachal Pradesh Legislative Assembly election : Yingkiong–Pangin
Party	Candidate	Votes	%	±%
INC(I)	Geogong Apang	4,799	56.57%	New
PPA	Bani Danggen	2,184	25.74%	New
Independent	Tagang Taki	1,501	17.69%	New
Margin of victory		2,615	30.82%	▲8.65
Turnout		8,484	75.92%	▲5.72
Registered electors		11,685		▲7.65
INC(I) gain from JP		Swing	▼4.52	

=== Assembly Election 1978 ===
1978 Arunachal Pradesh Legislative Assembly election : Yingkiong–Pangin
Party	Candidate	Votes	%	±%
JP	Geogong Apang	4,435	61.09%	New
Independent	Tagang Taki	2,825	38.91%	New
Margin of victory		1,610	22.18%	
Turnout		7,260	69.52%	
Registered electors		10,855		
JP win (new seat)				
