= Koloriang Assembly constituency =

Legislative Assembly constituency in Arunachal Pradesh State, India

Coordinates: 27.9°N 93.35°E

Koloriang
- Constituency No. 21 for the Arunachal Pradesh Legislative Assembly

Constituency details
- Country: India
- Region: Northeast India
- State: Arunachal Pradesh
- District: Kurung Kumey
- Lok Sabha constituency: Arunachal West
- Established: 1978
- Total electors: 14,546
- Reservation: ST

Member of Legislative Assembly
- 11th Arunachal Pradesh Legislative Assembly
- Incumbent Pani Taram
- Party: Bharatiya Janata Party

Koloriang is one of the 60 Legislative Assembly constituencies of Arunachal Pradesh state in India.

It is part of Kurung Kumey district and is reserved for candidates belonging to the Scheduled Tribes.

== Members of the Legislative Assembly ==
Election	Name	Party
1978	Tade Tachc (ST)	Independent politician
1978	Chera Talo	Janata Party
1980	Lokam Tado	Indian National Congress
1984	Chera Talo	Indian National Congress
1990	Chera Talo	Indian National Congress
1995	Kahfa Bengia	Independent politician
1999	Kahfa Bengia	Indian National Congress
2004	Lokam Tassar	Independent politician
2009	Lokam Tassar	Indian National Congress
2014	Pani Taram	People's Party of Arunachal
2019	Lokam Tassar	Bharatiya Janata Party
2024	Pani Taram	Bharatiya Janata Party

== Election results ==
=== Assembly Election 2024 ===
2024 Arunachal Pradesh Legislative Assembly election : Koloriang
Party	Candidate	Votes	%	±%
BJP	Pani Taram	11,594	90.53%	▲38.64
PPA	Kahfa Bengia	1,044	8.15%	New
NOTA	None of the Above	169	1.32%	▲0.98
Margin of victory		10,550	82.38%	▲78.26
Turnout		12,807	88.04%	▲0.75
Registered electors		14,546		▲14.63
BJP hold		Swing	▲38.64	

=== Assembly Election 2019 ===
2019 Arunachal Pradesh Legislative Assembly election : Koloriang
Party	Candidate	Votes	%	±%
BJP	Lokam Tassar	5,748	51.89%	New
NPP	Pani Taram	5,292	47.77%	New
NOTA	None of the Above	38	0.34%	▼0.07
Margin of victory		456	4.12%	▲1.26
Turnout		11,078	87.30%	▲6.97
Registered electors		12,690		▲4.96
BJP gain from PPA		Swing	▲0.67	

=== Assembly Election 2014 ===
2014 Arunachal Pradesh Legislative Assembly election : Koloriang
Party	Candidate	Votes	%	±%
PPA	Pani Taram	4,974	51.22%	New
INC	Lokam Tassar	4,697	48.37%	▼7.68
NOTA	None of the Above	40	0.41%	New
Margin of victory		277	2.85%	▼9.24
Turnout		9,711	80.32%	▼3.95
Registered electors		12,090		▲12.07
PPA gain from INC		Swing		

=== Assembly Election 2009 ===
2009 Arunachal Pradesh Legislative Assembly election : Koloriang
Party	Candidate	Votes	%	±%
INC	Lokam Tassar	5,095	56.04%	▲7.59
NCP	Kahfa Bengia	3,996	43.96%	New
Margin of victory		1,099	12.09%	▲9.00
Turnout		9,091	84.27%	▲19.63
Registered electors		10,788		▼5.98
INC gain from Independent		Swing		

=== Assembly Election 2004 ===
2004 Arunachal Pradesh Legislative Assembly election : Koloriang
Party	Candidate	Votes	%	±%
Independent	Lokam Tassar	3,823	51.54%	New
INC	Kahfa Bengia	3,594	48.46%	▼49.21
Margin of victory		229	3.09%	▼92.25
Turnout		7,417	64.62%	▼2.48
Registered electors		11,474		▲12.98
Independent gain from INC		Swing		

=== Assembly Election 1999 ===
1999 Arunachal Pradesh Legislative Assembly election : Koloriang
Party	Candidate	Votes	%	±%
INC	Kahfa Bengia	6,658	97.67%	▲48.81
AC	Lokam Tassar	159	2.33%	New
Margin of victory		6,499	95.34%	▲93.97
Turnout		6,817	68.18%	▼6.74
Registered electors		10,156		▲14.65
INC gain from Independent		Swing		

=== Assembly Election 1995 ===
1995 Arunachal Pradesh Legislative Assembly election : Koloriang
Party	Candidate	Votes	%	±%
Independent	Kahfa Bengia	3,286	50.22%	New
INC	Chera Talo	3,197	48.86%	New
JD	Augung Bengia	60	0.92%	New
Margin of victory		89	1.36%	
Turnout		6,543	75.52%	▲73.87
Registered electors		8,858		▼15.93
Independent gain from INC		Swing		

=== Assembly Election 1990 ===
1990 Arunachal Pradesh Legislative Assembly election : Koloriang
Party	Candidate	Votes	%	±%
INC	Chera Talo	Unopposed		
Registered electors		10,536		▲34.63
INC hold		Swing		

=== Assembly Election 1984 ===
1984 Arunachal Pradesh Legislative Assembly election : Koloriang
Party	Candidate	Votes	%	±%
INC	Chera Talo	Unopposed		
Registered electors		7,826 ▲10.74		
INC gain from INC(I)		Swing		

=== Assembly Election 1980 ===
1980 Arunachal Pradesh Legislative Assembly election : Koloriang
Party	Candidate	Votes	%	±%
INC(I)	Lokam Tado	2,377	57.61%	New
Independent	Chera Talo	1,749	42.39%	New
Margin of victory		628	15.22%	▲7.30
Turnout		4,126	63.35%	▼5.94
Registered electors		7,067		▲10.44
INC(I) gain from JP		Swing	▲3.65	

=== Assembly Election 1978 ===
1978 Arunachal Pradesh Legislative Assembly election : Koloriang
Party	Candidate	Votes	%	±%
JP	Chera Talo	2,221	53.96%	New
PPA	Lokam Tado	1,895	46.04%	New
Independent	Tade Tachc	1,048	68.54%	New
JP	Mukut Mithi	330	21.58%	New
Independent	Sole Linggi	151	9.88%	New
Margin of victory		326	7.92%	
Turnout		4,116	67.31%	
Registered electors		6,399		
JP win (new seat)				

== See also ==
- List of constituencies of the Arunachal Pradesh Legislative Assembly
- Kurung Kumey district
