= Daksing–Taliha Assembly constituency =

Constituency of the Arunachal Pradesh legislative assembly in India

Daksing–Taliha
- Former constituency for the Arunachal Pradesh Legislative Assembly

Constituency details
- Country: India
- Region: Northeast India
- State: Arunachal Pradesh
- Established: 1978
- Abolished: 1984
- Total electors: 11,119

Daksing–Taliha or Taksing–Taliha was an assembly constituency in the India state of Arunachal Pradesh.

== Members of the Legislative Assembly ==
Election	Member	Party
1978	Tara Payeng	People's Party of Arunachal
1980	Punji Mara	Indian National Congress
1984	Punji Mara	Indian National Congress

== Election results ==
=== Assembly Election 1984 ===
1984 Arunachal Pradesh Legislative Assembly election : Daksing-Taliha
Party	Candidate	Votes	%	±%
INC	Punji Mara	3,504	43.06%	New
BJP	Tara Payeng	2,844	34.95%	New
Independent	Tache Nalo	1,790	22.00%	New
Margin of victory		660	8.11%	▼3.62
Turnout		8,138	77.79%	▲7.50
Registered electors		11,119		▲23.94
INC gain from INC(I)		Swing	▼12.81	

=== Assembly Election 1980 ===
1980 Arunachal Pradesh Legislative Assembly election : Daksing-Taliha
Party	Candidate	Votes	%	±%
INC(I)	Punji Mara	3,292	55.86%	New
PPA	Tara Payeng	2,601	44.14%	▲11.56
Margin of victory		691	11.73%	▲9.47
Turnout		5,893	71.01%	▼3.38
Registered electors		8,971		▲5.79
INC(I) gain from PPA		Swing	▲23.29	

=== Assembly Election 1978 ===
1978 Arunachal Pradesh Legislative Assembly election : Daksing-Taliha
Party	Candidate	Votes	%	±%
PPA	Tara Payeng	1,908	32.58%	New
Independent	Pakda Mayeng	1,776	30.32%	New
Independent	Taw Choker	1,495	25.53%	New
JP	Tajen Sengdu	678	11.58%	New
Margin of victory		132	2.25%	
Turnout		5,857	72.15%	
Registered electors		8,480		
PPA win (new seat)				
