= Sibo Kai =

Indian politician

Sibo Kai, an Indian politician. Kai was nominated by the Governor of Arunachal Pradesh to the Arunachal Pradesh Legislative Assembly in 1978 (just after the 1978 election), becoming the first female member of that body. Kai was nominated in order to represent the Singpho people, an otherwise unrepresented group in the Assembly.
