= Pasighat Assembly constituency =

Constituency of the Arunachal Pradesh legislative assembly in India

Pasighat
- Former constituency for the Arunachal Pradesh Legislative Assembly

Constituency details
- Country: India
- Region: Northeast India
- State: Arunachal Pradesh
- Established: 1980
- Abolished: 1984
- Total electors: 13,659

Pasighat Assembly constituency was an assembly constituency in the India state of Arunachal Pradesh. After delimitation, it was divided into two new constituencies: Pasighat East Assembly constituency and Pasighat West Assembly constituency

== Members of the Legislative Assembly ==
Election	Member	Party
1980	Talo Kadu	People's Party of Arunachal
1984	Tapum Jamoh	People's Party of Arunachal

== Election results ==
=== Assembly Election 1984 ===
1984 Arunachal Pradesh Legislative Assembly election : Pasighat
Party	Candidate	Votes	%	±%
PPA	Tapum Jamoh	5,231	51.39%	▼12.02
INC	Tarung Pabin	4,948	48.61%	New
Margin of victory		283	2.78%	▼24.04
Turnout		10,179	77.43%	▼0.46
Registered electors		13,659		▲15.91
PPA hold		Swing	▼12.02	

=== Assembly Election 1980 ===
1980 Arunachal Pradesh Legislative Assembly election : Pasighat
Party	Candidate	Votes	%	±%
PPA	Talo Kadu	5,603	63.41%	New
INC(I)	Talom Rukbo	3,233	36.59%	New
Margin of victory		2,370	26.82%	
Turnout		8,836	77.17%	
Registered electors		11,784		
PPA win (new seat)				
