= Pongchau-Wakka Assembly constituency =

Constituency of the Arunachal Pradesh legislative assembly in India

Coordinates: 26.790°N 95.434°E

Pongchau-Wakka
- Constituency No. 60 for the Arunachal Pradesh Legislative Assembly

Constituency details
- Country: India
- Region: Northeast India
- State: Arunachal Pradesh
- District: Longding
- Lok Sabha constituency: Arunachal East
- Established: 1978
- Total electors: 16,060
- Reservation: ST

Member of Legislative Assembly
- 11th Arunachal Pradesh Legislative Assembly
- Incumbent Honchun Ngandam
- Party: Bharatiya Janata Party
- Elected year: 2024

Pongchau-Wakka is one of the 60 assembly constituencies of Arunachal Pradesh, a northeastern state of India. It is part of Arunachal East Lok Sabha constituency.

== Members of the Legislative Assembly ==
Election	Member	Party
1978	Wnagnam Wangshu	Janata Party
1980	Hejam Ponglaham	Indian National Congress
1984	Hejam Ponglaham	Indian National Congress
1990	Anok Wangsa	Indian National Congress
1995	Honchun Ngandam	Independent politician
1999	Anok Wangsa	Nationalist Congress Party
2004	Honchun Ngandam	Indian National Congress
2009	Honchun Ngandam	Indian National Congress
2014	Honchun Ngandam	Indian National Congress
2019	Honchun Ngandam	Bharatiya Janata Party
2024	Honchun Ngandam	Bharatiya Janata Party

== Election results ==
=== Assembly Election 2024 ===
2024 Arunachal Pradesh Legislative Assembly election : Pongchau-Wakka
Party	Candidate	Votes	%	±%
BJP	Honchun Ngandam	9,623	65.44%	▲10.69
Independent	Holai Wangsa	4,961	33.73%	New
NOTA	None of the Above	122	0.83%	▲0.20
Margin of victory		4,662	31.70%	▲1.77
Turnout		14,706	91.57%	▼0.91
Registered electors		16,060		▲18.93
BJP hold		Swing	▲10.69	

=== Assembly Election 2019 ===
2019 Arunachal Pradesh Legislative Assembly election : Pongchau-Wakka
Party	Candidate	Votes	%	±%
BJP	Honchun Ngandam	6,837	54.75%	▲36.50
INC	Thangkai Khusumchai	3,099	24.82%	▼18.91
PPA	Longwang Wangham	2,473	19.80%	▼7.52
NOTA	None of the Above	79	0.63%	▲0.04
Margin of victory		3,738	29.93%	▲13.53
Turnout		12,488	92.48%	▲3.65
Registered electors		13,504		▼3.44
BJP gain from INC		Swing	▲11.02	

=== Assembly Election 2014 ===
2014 Arunachal Pradesh Legislative Assembly election : Pongchau-Wakka
Party	Candidate	Votes	%	±%
INC	Honchun Ngandam	5,432	43.73%	▼17.90
PPA	Longwang Wangham	3,394	27.32%	▲2.97
BJP	Holai Wangsa	2,267	18.25%	New
NPF	Thangkai Khusumchai	1,127	9.07%	New
Independent	Kapnai Wangsa	128	1.03%	New
NOTA	None of the Above	74	0.60%	New
Margin of victory		2,038	16.41%	▼20.87
Turnout		12,422	88.82%	▲1.95
Registered electors		13,985		▼0.58
INC hold		Swing	▼17.90	

=== Assembly Election 2009 ===
2009 Arunachal Pradesh Legislative Assembly election : Pongchau-Wakka
Party	Candidate	Votes	%	±%
INC	Honchun Ngandam	7,531	61.63%	▲18.80
PPA	Anok Wangsa	2,976	24.35%	New
NCP	Kapnai Wangsa	1,713	14.02%	▼15.51
Margin of victory		4,555	37.27%	▲23.98
Turnout		12,220	86.88%	▼1.14
Registered electors		14,066		▲9.98
INC hold		Swing		

=== Assembly Election 2004 ===
2004 Arunachal Pradesh Legislative Assembly election : Pongchau-Wakka
Party	Candidate	Votes	%	±%
INC	Honchun Ngandam	4,821	42.83%	▼4.77
NCP	Anok Wangsa	3,324	29.53%	▼22.87
AC	Nasib Gagang Gapaham	1,715	15.23%	New
BJP	Kapnai Wangsa	1,397	12.41%	New
Margin of victory		1,497	13.30%	▲8.50
Turnout		11,257	88.49%	▲9.16
Registered electors		12,790		▲7.81
INC gain from NCP		Swing	▼9.57	

=== Assembly Election 1999 ===
1999 Arunachal Pradesh Legislative Assembly election : Pongchau-Wakka
Party	Candidate	Votes	%	±%
NCP	Anok Wangsa	4,902	52.40%	New
INC	Honchun Ngandam	4,453	47.60%	▲8.92
Margin of victory		449	4.80%	▲2.54
Turnout		9,355	81.10%	▼10.17
Registered electors		11,863		▲4.54
NCP gain from Independent		Swing		

=== Assembly Election 1995 ===
1995 Arunachal Pradesh Legislative Assembly election : Pongchau-Wakka
Party	Candidate	Votes	%	±%
Independent	Honchun Ngandam	4,136	40.94%	New
INC	Anok Wangsa	3,908	38.68%	▲10.03
BJP	Wangma Wangsa	2,059	20.38%	New
Margin of victory		228	2.26%	▲0.24
Turnout		10,103	90.58%	▲24.80
Registered electors		11,348		▲3.58
Independent gain from INC		Swing		

=== Assembly Election 1990 ===
1990 Arunachal Pradesh Legislative Assembly election : Pongchau-Wakka
Party	Candidate	Votes	%	±%
INC	Anok Wangsa	2,016	28.65%	▼9.37
Independent	Wangma Wangsa	1,874	26.63%	New
JD	Pongbo Wangsa	1,695	24.09%	New
Independent	Wangpoi Wangsa	1,452	20.63%	New
Margin of victory		142	2.02%	▼7.50
Turnout		7,037	66.38%	▲21.27
Registered electors		10,956		▲24.08
INC hold		Swing	▼9.37	

=== Assembly Election 1984 ===
1984 Arunachal Pradesh Legislative Assembly election : Pongchau-Wakka
Party	Candidate	Votes	%	±%
INC	Hejam Ponglaham	1,442	38.02%	New
PPA	Anok	1,081	28.50%	▲13.35
Independent	Chanwang Wangsa	784	20.67%	New
Independent	Nokram Wangham	486	12.81%	New
Margin of victory		361	9.52%	▼33.29
Turnout		3,793	45.71%	▲17.81
Registered electors		8,830		▲13.26
INC gain from INC(I)		Swing	▼19.94	

=== Assembly Election 1980 ===
1980 Arunachal Pradesh Legislative Assembly election : Pongchau-Wakka
Party	Candidate	Votes	%	±%
INC(I)	Hejam Ponglaham	1,136	57.96%	New
PPA	Atem Biham	297	15.15%	New
Independent	Achingh Wangham	290	14.80%	New
Independent	Nokram Wangham	237	12.09%	New
Margin of victory		839	42.81%	▲23.55
Turnout		1,960	26.98%	▼3.90
Registered electors		7,796		▲0.45
INC(I) gain from JP		Swing	▼1.67	

=== Assembly Election 1978 ===
1978 Arunachal Pradesh Legislative Assembly election : Pongchau-Wakka
Party	Candidate	Votes	%	±%
JP	Wnagnam Wangshu	1,344	59.63%	New
Independent	Aching	910	40.37%	New
Margin of victory		434	19.25%	
Turnout		2,254	30.67%	
Registered electors		7,761		
JP win (new seat)				

== See also ==
- Pongchau-Wakka
- Longding district
- List of constituencies of Arunachal Pradesh Legislative Assembly
