= Chow Tewa Mein =

Indian politician (died 2023)

Chow Tewa Mein (c. 1942 – 15 May 2023) was an Indian politician from the state of Arunachal Pradesh.

Chow Tewa Mein was elected unopposed from the Chowkham constituency in the 2014 Arunachal Pradesh Legislative Assembly election, standing as a People's Party of Arunachal candidate. In terms of educational qualification, he was a graduate (B.A.).

Mein was one of six MLAs along with Chief Minister Pema Khandu to be suspended by the PPA for anti-party activities.

Mein died on 15 May 2023, at the age of 80.

== See also ==
- Arunachal Pradesh Legislative Assembly
