= Honchun Ngandam =

Indian politician

Member of the Arunachal Pradesh Legislative Assembly
- Constituency: Pongchau-Wakka
- In office 1995–1999
- Incumbent
- Assumed office 2004

Personal details
- Party: Bharatiya Janata Party

Honchun Ngandam (born 1966) is an Indian politician from Arunachal Pradesh. He is a member of the Arunachal Pradesh Legislative Assembly representing the Pongchau-Wakka constituency since 2004.

He contested the Pongchau-Wakka constituency in Longding district representing the Bharatiya Janata Party and won the 2024 Arunachal Pradesh Legislative Assembly election. He served as Minister of Education, Urban development and Rural Works Department in the Pema Khandu government.

== Early life and education ==
Ngandam hails from the tribal community in Pongchau in Longding district. He is a graduate.

== Career ==
Ngandam began his political journey as an independent, first being elected from Pongchau-Wakka in the 1995 Arunachal Pradesh Legislative Assembly election, before losing to Anok Wangsa of the Nationalist Congress Party in 1999. He joined the Indian National Congress for the 2004 when he was re-elected to the Pongchau-Wakka seat with a margin of almost 1500 votes. Subsequently, he retained the seat in the 2009 state assembly elections as well as in 2014. Before the 2019 elections, he shifted to the Bharatiya Janata Party, and won the seat on its ticket. He won the seat for the fifth time in the 2024 Arunachal Pradesh Legislative Assembly election.

He won as MLA for the fourth time winning the 2024 Arunachal Pradesh Legislative Assembly election representing BJP.
