= Niausa–Kanubari Assembly constituency =

Constituency of the Arunachal Pradesh legislative assembly in India

Niausa–Kanubari
- Former constituency for the Arunachal Pradesh Legislative Assembly

Constituency details
- Country: India
- Region: Northeast India
- State: Arunachal Pradesh
- Established: 1978
- Abolished: 1984
- Total electors: 9,584

Niausa–Kanubari Assembly constituency was an assembly constituency in the India state of Arunachal Pradesh.

== Members of the Legislative Assembly ==
Election	Member	Party
1978	Noksong Boham	Janata Party
1980	Wanghlu Wangshu	People's Party of Arunachal
1984	Noksong Boham	Indian National Congress

== Election results ==
=== Assembly Election 1984 ===
1984 Arunachal Pradesh Legislative Assembly election : Niausa–Kanubari
Party	Candidate	Votes	%	±%
INC	Noksong Boham	2,257	39.26%	New
Independent	Rawang Wangham	646	11.24%	New
Independent	Tingpong Wangham	552	9.60%	New
Independent	Wangnam Wangshu	497	8.64%	New
Independent	Newlai Tingkhatra	464	8.07%	New
Independent	Noksi Wangsu	442	7.69%	New
Independent	Pantoon Wangpan	439	7.64%	New
Independent	Hiahoi Bor Wangshu	218	3.79%	New
Independent	Laichat Arangham	128	2.23%	New
Independent	Atem Bihab	106	1.84%	New
Margin of victory		1,611	28.02%	
Turnout		5,749	63.98%	▲59.99
Registered electors		9,584		▲12.37
INC gain from PPA		Swing		

=== Assembly Election 1980 ===
1980 Arunachal Pradesh Legislative Assembly election : Niausa–Kanubari
Party	Candidate	Votes	%	±%
PPA	Wanghlu Wangshu	Unopposed		
Registered electors		8,529		▲6.95
PPA gain from JP		Swing		

=== Assembly Election 1978 ===
1978 Arunachal Pradesh Legislative Assembly election : Niausa–Kanubari
Party	Candidate	Votes	%	±%
JP	Noksong Boham	Unopposed		
Registered electors		7,975		
JP win (new seat)				
