= 1984 Arunachal Pradesh Legislative Assembly election =

- 24 December 1984

All 30 seats in the Arunachal Pradesh Legislative Assembly 16 seats needed for a majority
- Registered: 311,220
- Turnout: 76.34%
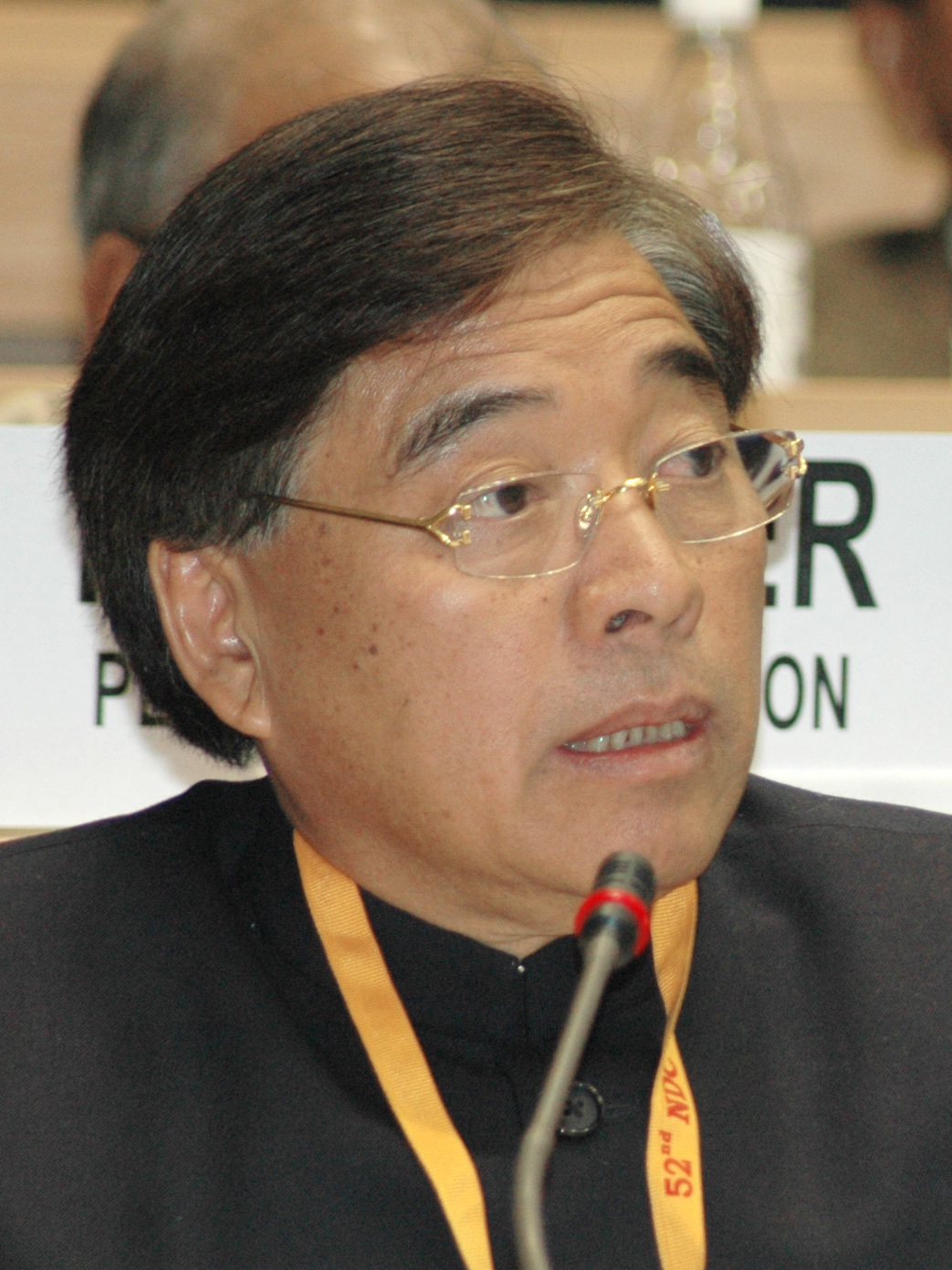
	Majority party	Minority party
		PPA
Leader	Gegong Apang
Party	INC	PPA
Last election	13	13
Seats won	21	4
Seat change	▲8	▼9
CM before election
Gegong Apang
INC
Elected CM
Gegong Apang
INC

The third Arunachal Pradesh Legislative Assembly election was held on the 24th December 1984. Indian National Congress (INC) won 21 seats out of 30 seats, while the People's Party of Arunachal (PPA) won four seats and independent candidates won four seats. Gegong Apang was sworn in as Chief Minister.

The election was held in 1,127 different polling stations and the average number of electors per polling station was 283. 28 men and 2 women were successful candidates.

== Electors ==
Number of valid votes	2,24,717
Number of rejected votes	12,868 ( 5.42% of Total Votes Polled)

== Results ==
PArty	Contested	Won	FD	Votes	%	Seats%
BJP	6	1	0	17,283	7.69%	29.45%
INC	30	21	1	96791	43.07%	43.07%
JNP	3	0	3	845	0.38%	3.03%
PPA	13	4	1	34910	15.54%	36.74%
Independents	63	4	40	74888	33.33%	42.15%
Total	115	30	45	224717		

=== Results by constituency ===
Winner, runner-up, voter turnout, and victory margin in every constituency
Assembly Constituency		Turnout	Winner				Runner Up				Margin
#k	Names	%	Candidate	Party	Votes	%	Candidate	Party	Votes	%	Margin
1	Tawang-I	80.62%	Karma Wangchu	INC	2,992	65.16%	Tashi Norbu	PPA	1,600	34.84%	1,392
2	Tawang-II	80.13%	Tsering Tashi	INC	3,139	64.35%	Tsering Chuki	PPA	1,739	35.65%	1,400
3	Dirang–Kalaktang	81.64%	R. K. Khrimey	Independent	3,925	49.05%	Nima Tsering Khrime	INC	3,444	43.04%	481
4	Bomdila	77.05%	Japu Deru	PPA	1,894	36.03%	Sinam Dususow	INC	1,737	33.04%	157
5	Seppa	76.19%	Nyari Welly	INC	3,419	35.35%	Mape Dada	Independent	3,376	34.9%	43
6	Chayangtajo	84.36%	Kameng Dolo	INC	4,744	54.05%	Mai Sonam	Independent	4,033	45.95%	711
7	Koloriang	-	Chera Talo	INC	Elected Unopposed						
8	Nyapin-Palin	80.08%	Tadar Tang	INC	3,265	41.05%	Kamen Ringu	PPA	2,836	35.66%	429
9	Doimukh–Sagalee	70.93%	Techi Takar	INC	5,203	39.97%	Nabam Atum	Independent	3,075	23.62%	2,128
10	Ziro–Hapoli	73.21%	Gyati Takka	INC	2,938	25.41%	Padi Yubbe	Independent	2,809	24.29%	129
11	Riga-Tali	73.01%	Boa Tamo	INC	1,762	25.54%	Mem Kabak	BJP	1,686	24.44%	76
12	Daporijo	82.14%	Tadak Dulom	INC	4,651	44.96%	Larbin Nachi	BJP	4,629	44.75%	22
13	Daksing-Taliha	77.79%	Punji Mara	INC	3,504	43.06%	Tara Payeng	BJP	2,844	34.95%	660
14	Mechuka	80.76%	Tadik Chije	Independent	1,492	35.63%	Pasang Wangchuk Sona	INC	1,310	31.29%	182
15	Along North	82.79%	Lijum Ronya	BJP	2,811	32.21%	Talong Taggu	INC	2,763	31.66%	48
16	Along South	78.09%	Doi Ado	PPA	4,523	52.51%	Boken Ette	Independent	3,270	37.96%	1,253
17	Basar	84.26%	Todak Basar	INC	5,701	63.97%	Tamar Karlo	PPA	3,211	36.03%	2,490
18	Pasighat	77.43%	Tapum Jamoh	PPA	5,231	51.39%	Tarung Pabin	INC	4,948	48.61%	283
19	Yingkiong–Pangin	79.86%	Geogong Apang	INC	6,880	66.22%	Tanung Mize	PPA	3,510	33.78%	3,370
20	Meriang-Mebo	80.46%	Bakin Pertin	PPA	4,167	51.42%	Kabang Borang	INC	3,937	48.58%	230
21	Anini	61.45%	Tade Tacho	INC	1,303	52.46%	Maru Mili	Independent	773	31.12%	530
22	Roing	75.69%	Mutchu Mithi	INC	3,023	46.89%	Abom Bornag	PPA	2,228	34.56%	795
23	Nomsai–Chowkham	75.67%	C. P. Namshoom	Independent	5,816	43.71%	Chau Khouk Manpoong	INC	5,634	42.34%	182
24	Tezu Hayuliang	76.23%	Khapriso Krong	INC	5,297	53.21%	Sobeng Tayang	Independent	4,343	43.63%	954
25	Noadehing–Nampong	74.21%	Kamoli Mossang	Independent	2,937	48.99%	Samchom Ngemu	INC	2,682	44.74%	255
26	Changlang	80.99%	Tengam Ngemu	INC	3,055	53.05%	Wangnia Pongte	Independent	2,573	44.68%	482
27	Khonsa South	79.92%	T. L. Rajkumar	INC	2,656	42.67%	Sijen Kongkang	PPA	1,478	23.75%	1,178
28	Khonsa North	74.54%	Kapchen Rajkumar	INC	2,284	33.59%	Wanglat Lowangcha	Independent	1,786	26.26%	498
29	Niausa–Kanubari	63.98%	Noksong Boham	INC	2,257	39.26%	Rawang Wangham	Independent	646	11.24%	1,611
30	Pongchau-Wakka	45.71%	Hejam Ponglaham	INC	1,442	38.02%	Anok	PPA	1,081	28.5%	361
