= 1978 Arunachal Pradesh Legislative Assembly election =

- 25 February 1978

All 30 seats in the Arunachal Pradesh Legislative Assembly 16 seats needed for a majority
- Registered: 224,839
- Turnout: 73.20%
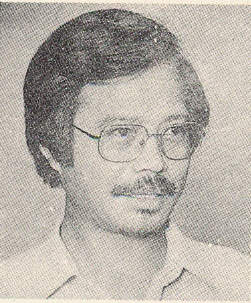

	Majority party	Minority party
Leader	Prem Khandu Thungan
Party	JP	PPA
Seats won	17	8
Seat change	New	New
Chief Minister before election
Office established
Elected Chief Minister
Prem Khandu Thungan
Janata Party

The first elections to the Arunachal Pradesh Legislative Assembly were held in on 25 February 1978.

There were 30 single-member constituencies at the time of the election, out of whom two were reserved for Scheduled Tribes. There was a total of 86 candidates participating. The maximum number of candidates was found in the Ziro constituency, with six candidates. In two constituencies (Prem Khandu Thungan from Dirang, Kalaktang and Noksong Boham from Niasua-Kanubari) there was only one candidate, who was elected unopposed. There were 29 Janata Party candidates, 21 People's Party of Arunachal candidates, 1 Indian National Congress candidate (Shri Tasso Grayu) and 35 independents in the fray. The speaker of the Legislative Assembly, Nonemati, contested as a Janata Party candidate from Khonsa North constituency. A total of 105 nominations had been presented, out of which 3 had been rejected by the Election Commission (a PPA candidate from Yingdiono-Pangin constituency, an independent from Ziro and an independent from Along North).

A peculiar situation for the tribal societies of the Union Territory was that in many constituencies members of the same families (even brothers) or clans fought against each other for different parties. There were only two female candidates (Nyari Welly and Omem Deori) standing in the election. Neither was elected.

Janata Party won 17 seats, compared to 8 seats for the PPA. Five seats were won by independents. Following the election, a five-member cabinet was sworn in on 14 March 1978, headed by Janata Party leader Prem Khandu Thungan as Chief Minister. Other ministers were Gegong Apang, Tadar Tang, Soben Tayang and Nokme. The newly elected assembly held its first session in Itanagar on 21 March 1978. Three members were nominated by the Governor to sit in the Assembly, amongst them was one woman (Sibo Kai).

== Results ==
Party	Votes	%	Seats	+/–
Janata Party	66,906	42.08	17	New
People's Party of Arunachal	48,075	30.24	8	New
Indian National Congress	720	0.45	0	New
Independents	43,287	27.23	5	New
Total	158,988	100.00	30	New
Valid votes	158,988	96.60		
Invalid/blank votes	5,599	3.40		
Total votes	164,587	100.00		
Registered voters/turnout	224,839	73.20		
Source: ECI

=== Results by constituency ===
Winner, runner-up, voter turnout, and victory margin in every constituency
Assembly Constituency		Turnout	Winner				Runner Up				Margin
#k	Names	%	Candidate	Party	Votes	%	Candidate	Party	Votes	%	Margin
1	Tawang-I	74.50%	Karma Wangchu	Independent	2,313	65.17%	Tashi Lama	JP	1,236	34.83%	1,077
2	Tawang-II	76.92%	Tashi Khandu	Independent	1,874	53.39%	Tsering Tashi	JP	1,636	46.61%	238
3	Dirang–Kalaktang	-	Prem Khandu Thungon	JP	Elected Unopposed						
4	Bomdila	75.69%	Rinchin Kharu	JP	2,734	73.49%	Dorjee Tsering	Independent	986	26.51%	1,748
5	Seppa	62.06%	Donglo Sonam	JP	4,232	65.28%	Nyari Welly	PPA	1,649	25.44%	2,583
6	Chayangtajo	64.33%	Kameng Dolo	JP	3,396	57.51%	Tame Yangfo	PPA	2,509	42.49%	887
7	Koloriang	67.31%	Chera Talo	JP	2,221	53.96%	Lokam Tado	PPA	1,895	46.04%	326
8	Nyapin-Palin	59.28%	Tadar Tang	JP	3,961	79.86%	Tadar Taniang	PPA	999	20.14%	2,962
9	Doimukh–Sagalee	80.72%	Tara Sinda	JP	2,149	32.61%	Khoda Tana	Independent	1,520	23.07%	629
10	Ziro–Hapoli	75.61%	Padi Yubbe	JP	4,529	44.80%	Grati Takka	Independent	2,014	19.92%	2,515
11	Riga-Tali	76.93%	Nido Techi	JP	3,539	55.00%	Boa Tamo	PPA	2,896	45.00%	643
12	Daporijo	87.07%	Tadak Dulom	JP	4,981	58.87%	Tabom Nguba	PPA	3,480	41.13%	1,501
13	Daksing-Taliha	72.15%	Tara Payeng	PPA	1,908	32.58%	Pakda Mayeng	Independent	1,776	30.32%	132
14	Mechuka	84.80%	Tadik Chije	Independent	1,903	47.79%	Tapik Rinya	PPA	1,119	28.10%	784
15	Along North	81.96%	Lijum Ronya	PPA	3,394	51.13%	Talong Taggu	Independent	1,868	28.14%	1,526
16	Along South	82.82%	Boken Ette	Independent	1,972	27.88%	Tumpakete	JP	1,504	21.26%	468
17	Basar	89.26%	Tomo Riba	PPA	4,109	59.93%	Tadak Basar	JP	2,747	40.07%	1,362
18	Pasighat	80.90%	Sutem Tasung	PPA	4,857	59.93%	Tarung Pabin	JP	1,906	23.52%	2,951
19	Yingkiong–Pangin	69.52%	Geogong Apang	JP	4,435	61.09%	Tagang Taki	Independent	2,825	38.91%	1,610
20	Meriang-Mebo	74.96%	Onyok Rome	PPA	3,717	59.94%	Kabang Borang	Independent	1,587	25.59%	2,130
21	Koloriang	44.49%	Tade Tachc	Independent	1,048	68.54%	Mukut Mithi	JP	330	21.58%	718
22	Roing	74.18%	Aken Lego	PPA	2,102	60.09%	Gora Partin	JP	930	26.59%	1,172
23	Nomsai–Chowkham	81.72%	Chow Tewa Mien	JP	4,542	41.99%	Chau Khouk Manpoong	PPA	3,036	28.07%	1,506
24	Tezu Hayuliang	66.02%	Sobeng Tayeng	JP	4,761	71.98%	Yiasing Minin	PPA	1,853	28.02%	2,908
25	Noadehing–Nampong	76.22%	Jungpum Jugli	PPA	1,209	34.58%	Samchom Ngemu	Independent	962	27.52%	247
26	Changlang	76.30%	Tengam Ngemu	JP	2,194	50.82%	Nongcho	PPA	1,643	38.06%	551
27	Khonsa South	75.98%	Sijen Kongkang	PPA	2,035	36.57%	Wangpha Lowang	JP	1,826	32.81%	209
28	Khonsa North	74.52%	Nokmey Namati	JP	1,866	36.65%	Wanglat Lowangcha	PPA	1,401	27.52%	465
29	Niausa–Kanubari	-	Noksong Boham	JP	Elected Unopposed						
30	Pongchau-Wakka	30.67%	Wnagnam Wangshu	JP	1,344	59.63%	Aching	Independent	910	40.37%	434
