= Lijum Ronya =

Indian politician

Lijum Ronya is a politician from Arunachal Pradesh in India. He was founding member of Bharatiya Janata Party in the state of Arunachal Pradesh along with M. R. Dodum in 1982. Later, he was elected in Arunachal Pradesh Legislative Assembly from 1990 to 1999 from Liromoba on Indian National Congress. He was also elected from Along North as a Bharatiya Janata Party member in 1984.
