= Japu Deru =

Indian politician

Japu Deru is an Indian politician from the state of Arunachal Pradesh.

Deru was elected unopposed from the Bomdila constituency in the 2014 Arunachal Pradesh Legislative Assembly election, standing as a BJP candidate.

== See also ==
- Arunachal Pradesh Legislative Assembly
