= Mutchu Mithi =

Indian politician

Member of the Arunachal Pradesh Legislative Assembly

Mutchu Mithi (born April 28, 1978 at Roing, Arunachal Pradesh) is an Indian politician from the state of Arunachal Pradesh.

Mithi was elected from the Roing constituency in the 2014, 2019 and 2024 Arunachal Pradesh Legislative Assembly elections. In terms of educational qualification, he is a graduate.

== See also ==
- Arunachal Pradesh Legislative Assembly
