= 2024 Arunachal Pradesh Legislative Assembly election =

2024 assembly elections in Arunachal Pradesh

- 19 April 2024

50 out of 60 seats in the Arunachal Pradesh Legislative Assembly (Note: 10 BJP MLAs were elected unopposed.) 31 seats needed for a majority
- Turnout: 82.95% (▲0.78 pp) (Note: does not include postal ballots)
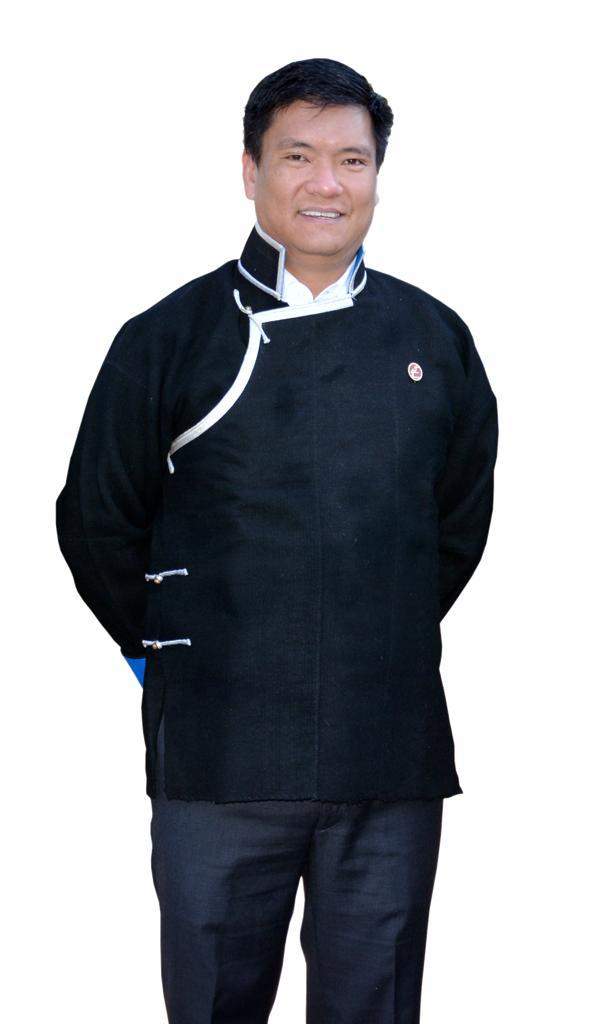

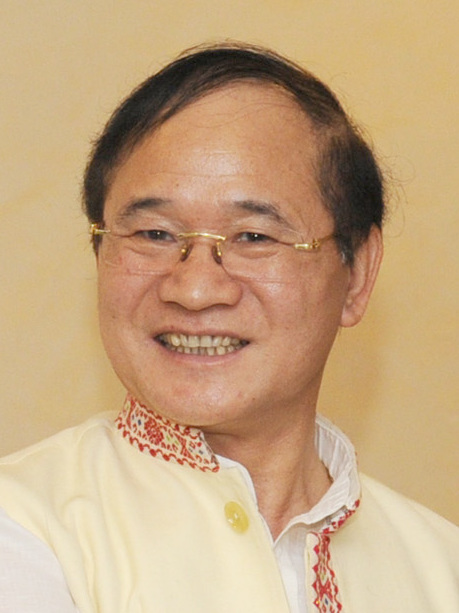
	Majority party	Minority party	Third party
Leader	Pema Khandu	Thangwang Wangham	Likha Saaya
Party	BJP	NPP	NCP
Leader since	2016	2023	2024
Leader's seat	Mukto (Won)	Longding–Pumao	Did not contest
Last election	50.86%, 41 seats	14.55%, 5 seats	New
Seats won	46	5	3
Seat change	▲5	Steady	▲3
Popular vote	3,32,773	98,254	63,630
Percentage	54.57%	16.11%	10.43%
Swing	▲3.71 pp	▲1.56 pp	▲10.43 pp
	Fourth party	Fifth party
Leader	Kahfa Bengia	Nabam Tuki
Party	PPA	INC
Leader since	2019	2011
Leader's seat	Koloriang (Lost)	Did not contest
Last election	1.71%, 1 seat	16.85%, 4 seats
Seats won	2	1
Seat change	▲1	▼3
Popular vote	44,176	33,877
Percentage	7.24%	5.56%
Swing	▲5.53 pp	▼11.29 pp

- Structure of the Arunachal Pradesh Legislative Assembly after the election
Chief Minister before election
Pema Khandu
BJP
Chief Minister after election
Pema Khandu
BJP

Legislative Assembly elections were held in Arunachal Pradesh on 19 April 2024 to elect the 60 members of the 11th Arunachal Pradesh Assembly. The votes were counted and the results were declared on 2 June 2024 the Bharatiya Janata Party has won the election massively with 46 out of 60 seats and Pema Khandu sworn in as Chief Minister of Arunachal Pradesh for the third time.

== Background ==
The tenure of Arunachal Pradesh Legislative Assembly was scheduled to end on 2 June 2024. The previous assembly elections were held in April 2019. After the election, Bharatiya Janata Party formed the state government, with Pema Khandu becoming the Chief Minister.

== Schedule ==
The schedule of the election was announced by the Election Commission of India on 16 March 2024.

Poll event	Schedule
Notification date	20 March 2024
Last date for filing nomination	27 March 2024
Scrutiny of nomination	28 March 2024
Last date for withdrawal of nomination	30 March 2024
Date of poll	19 April 2024
Date of Counting of Votes	2 June 2024

== Parties and alliances ==
Party	Flag	Symbol	Leader	Seats contested
Bharatiya Janata Party			Pema Khandu	60
National People's Party			Thangwang Wangham	20
Indian National Congress			Nabam Tuki	19
Nationalist Congress Party			Likha Saaya	15
People's Party of Arunachal			Kahfa Bengia	11

== Candidates ==
District	Constituency							
District	Constituency		BJP		INC		NPP	
Tawang	1	Lumla	BJP	Tsering Lhamu	INC	Jampa Thirnly Kunkhap		
Tawang	2	Tawang	BJP	Tsering Dorjee			NPP	Namgey Tsering
Tawang	3	Mukto	BJP	Pema Khandu				
West Kameng	4	Dirang	BJP	Phurpa Tsering			NPP	Yeshi Tsewang
West Kameng	5	Kalaktang	BJP	Tseten Chombay Kee				
West Kameng	6	Thrizino-Buragaon	BJP	Kumsi Sidisow				
West Kameng	7	Bomdila	BJP	Dongru Siongju				
Bichom	8	Bameng	BJP	Doba Lamnio	INC	Kumar Wali		
East Kameng	9	Chayangtajo	BJP	Hayeng Mangfi	INC	Kompu Dolo		
East Kameng	10	Seppa East	BJP	Eallimg Talang	INC	Tame Gyadi		
East Kameng	11	Seppa West	BJP	Mama Natung			NPP	Tani Loffa
Pakke-Kessang	12	Pakke-Kessang	BJP	Biyuram Wahge	INC	Gollo Yapang Tana		
Papum Pare	13	Itanagar	BJP	Techi Kaso				
Papum Pare	14	Doimukh	BJP	Tana Hali Tara	INC	Nabam Tado		
Papum Pare	15	Sagalee	BJP	Ratu Techi				
Keyi Panyor	16	Yachuli	BJP	Taba Tedir				
Lower Subansiri	17	Ziro-Hapoli	BJP	Hage Appa				
Kra-Daadi	18	Palin	BJP	Balo Raja	INC	Tarh Johny	NPP	Mayu Taring
Kurung Kumey	19	Nyapin	BJP	Tai Nikio				
Kra-Daadi	20	Tali	BJP	Jikke Tako				
Kurung Kumey	21	Koloriang	BJP	Pani Taram				
Upper Subansiri	22	Nacho	BJP	Nakap Nalo	INC	Tanga Byaling		
Upper Subansiri	23	Taliha	BJP	Nyato Rigia				
Upper Subansiri	24	Daporijo	BJP	Taniya Soki	INC	Reri Kirbe Dulom	NPP	Dikto Yekar
Kamle	25	Raga	BJP	Rotom Tebin			NPP	Ajay Murtem
Upper Subansiri	26	Dumporijo	BJP	Rode Bui			NPP	Tabe Doni
West Siang	27	Liromoba	NPP	Pesi Jilen				
Lower Siang	28	Likabali	BJP	Kardo Nyigyor				
Lepa Rada	29	Basar	BJP	Nyabi Jini Dirchi			NPP	Gokar Basar
West Siang	30	Along West	BJP	Topin Ete			NPP	Nyamo Ete
West Siang	31	Along East	BJP	Kento Jini				
Siang district	32	Rumgong	BJP	Talem Taboh	INC	Taling Yaying	NPP	Taja Bonung
Shi Yomi	33	Mechuka	BJP	Pasang Dorjee Sona				
Upper Siang	34	Tuting-Yingkiong	BJP	Alo Libang				
Siang district	35	Pangin	BJP	Ojing Tasing	INC	Takku Jerang	NPP	Tamo Taggu
Lower Siang	36	Nari-Koyu	BJP	Tojir Kadu				
East Siang	37	Pasighat West	BJP	Ninong Ering				
East Siang	38	Pasighat East	BJP	Kaling Moyong			NPP	Tapi Darang
East Siang	39	Mebo	BJP	Lombo Tayeng				
Upper Siang	40	Mariyang-Geku	BJP	Olom Panyang			NPP	Oni Panyang
Dibang Valley	41	Anini	BJP	Mopi Mihu				
Lower Dibang Valley	42	Dambuk	BJP	Puinnyo Apum	INC	Tobing Lego		
Lower Dibang Valley	43	Roing	BJP	Mutchu Mithi				
Lohit	44	Tezu	BJP	Mahesh Chai	INC	Jermai Krong	NPP	Karikho Kri
Anjaw	45	Hayuliang	BJP	Dasanglu Pul				
Namsai	46	Chowkham	BJP	Chowna Mein				
Namsai	47	Namsai	BJP	Chau Zingnu Namchoom				
Namsai	48	Lekang	BJP	Sujana Namchoom	INC	Tana Tamar Tara		
Changlang	49	Bordumsa-Diyun	BJP	Somlung Mossang				
Changlang	50	Miao	BJP	Kamlung Mosang	INC	Chatu Longri		
Changlang	51	Nampong	BJP	Izmir Tikhak	INC	Khimshom Mossang		
Changlang	52	Changlang South	BJP	Hamjong Tangha			NPP	Timpu Ngemu
Changlang	53	Changlang North	BJP	Tesam Pongte	INC	Marina Kenglang	NPP	Dihom Kitnya
Tirap	54	Namsang	BJP	Wangki Lowang				
Tirap	55	Khonsa East	BJP	Kamrang Tesia			NPP	Nokju Wanghop
Tirap	56	Khonsa West	BJP	Chakat Aboh	INC	Tangse Tekwa		
Tirap	57	Borduria-Bogapani	BJP	Wanglin Lowangdong				
Longding	58	Kanubari	BJP	Gabriel Denwang Wangsu	INC	Sompha Wangsa	NPP	Panjam Wangsa
Longding	59	Longding-Pumao	BJP	Tanpho Wangnaw			NPP	Thangwang Wangham
Longding	60	Pongchau-Wakka	BJP	Honchun Ngandam				

== Surveys and polls ==
=== Exit polls ===
Polling agency	BJP	INC	Others	Lead
Polling agency	Axis My India	44-51	1-4	4-12

== Results ==
=== Results by party ===
Party	Popular vote			Seats		
Party	Votes	%	±pp	Contested	Won	+/−
Bharatiya Janata Party	332,773	54.57%	▲3.71	60 (10 unopposed)	46	▲5
National People's Party	98,254	16.11%	▲1.55	20	5	Steady
Nationalist Congress Party	63,630	10.43%	▲10.43	14	3	▲3
People's Party of Arunachal	44,176	7.24%	▲5.51	11	2	▲1
Indian National Congress	33,877	5.56%	▼11.29	20	1	▼3
Other parties	4,875	0.8%	▼11.28	5	0	▼7
Independents	28,225	4.63%	▼2.36	13	3	▲1
NOTA	4,010	0.66%	▼0.28			
Total	609,820	100%	-	143	60	-

=== Results by district ===
District	Seats				
District	Seats	BJP	NPP	INC	OTH
Tawang	3	2	1	—N/a	—N/a
West Kameng	4	3	—N/a	—N/a	1
Bichom	1	—N/a	—N/a	1	—N/a
East Kameng	3	3	—N/a	—N/a	—N/a
Pakke-Kessang	1	1	—N/a	—N/a	—N/a
Papum Pare	3	2	—N/a	—N/a	1
Keyi Panyor	1	—N/a	—N/a	—N/a	1
Lower Subansiri	1	1	—N/a	—N/a	—N/a
Kra-Daadi	2	2	—N/a	—N/a	—N/a
Kurung Kumey	2	2	—N/a	—N/a	—N/a
Upper Subansiri	4	4	—N/a	—N/a	—N/a
Kamle	1	1	—N/a	—N/a	—N/a
West Siang	3	2	1	—N/a	—N/a
Lower Siang	2	2	—N/a	—N/a	—N/a
Lepa Rada	1	1	—N/a	—N/a	—N/a
Siang	2	2	—N/a	—N/a	—N/a
Shi Yomi	1	1	—N/a	—N/a	—N/a
Upper Siang	2	1	1	—N/a	—N/a
East Siang	3	1	1	—N/a	1
Dibang Valley	1	1	—N/a	—N/a	—N/a
Lower Dibang Valley	2	2	—N/a	—N/a	—N/a
Lohit	1	1	—N/a	—N/a	—N/a
Anjaw	1	1	—N/a	—N/a	—N/a
Namsai	3	2	—N/a	—N/a	1
Changlang	5	3	—N/a	—N/a	2
Tirap	4	3	—N/a	—N/a	1
Longding	3	2	1	—N/a	—N/a
Total	60	46	5	1	8

=== Results by constituency ===
Result by constituency
Constituency		Winner				Runner-up				Margin
#	Name	Candidate	Party	Votes	%	Candidate	Party	Votes	%	Margin
Tawang district
1	Lumla	Tsering Lhamu	BJP	5,040	58.51	Jampa Thirnly Kunkhap	INC	3,509	40.74	1,531
2	Tawang	Namgey Tsering	NPP	4,667	55.6	Tsering Dorjee	BJP	3,671	43.73	996
3	Mukto	Pema Khandu	BJP	Elected unopposed						
West Kameng district
4	Dirang	Phurpa Tsering	BJP	7,430	54.08	Yeshi Tsewang	NPP	6,228	44.33	1,202
5	Kalaktang	Tseten Chombay Kee	BJP	6,030	65.03	Wangdi Dorjee Khrimey	NCP	3,161	35.09	2,869
6	Thrizino-Buragaon	Tenzin Nyima Glow	IND	5,593	51.36	Kumsi Sidisow	BJP	5,193	47.69	400
7	Bomdila	Dongru Siongju	BJP	Elected unopposed						
Bichom district
8	Bameng	Kumar Waii	INC	6,554	52.36	Doba Lamnio	BJP	5,919	47.28	635
East Kameng district
9	Chayangtajo	Hayeng Mangfi	BJP	8,809	80.35	Kompu Dolo	INC	2,124	19.37	6,685
10	Seppa East	Ealing Tallang	BJP	7,412	79.95	Tame Gyadi	INC	1,812	19.54	5,600
11	Seppa West	Mama Natung	BJP	4,430	58.14	Tani Loffa	NPP	3,181	41.75	1,249
Pakke-Kessang district
12	Pakke-Kessang	Biyuram Wahge	BJP	3,933	47.48	Techi Hemu	NCP	3,120	37.66	813
Papum Pare district
13	Itanagar	Techi Kaso	BJP	Elected unopposed						
14	Doimukh	Nabam Vivek	PPA	11,409	54.48	Tana Hali Tara	BJP	8,879	42.4	2,530
15	Sagalee	Ratu Techi	BJP	Elected unopposed						
Keyi Panyor district
16	Yachuli	Toko Tatung	NCP	8,285	50.57	Taba Tedir	BJP	8,027	49.17	228
Lower Subansiri district
17	Ziro-Hapoli	Hage Appa	BJP	Elected unopposed						
Kra Daadi district
18	Palin	Balo Raja	BJP	10,029	65.19	Mayu Taring	NPP	4,989	32.43	5,040
Kurung Kumey district
19	Nyapin	Tai Nikio	BJP	7,896	54.01	Tadar Mangku	PPA	6,714	45.92	1,182
Kra Daadi district
20	Tali	Jikke Tako	BJP	Elected unopposed						
Kurung Kumey district
21	Koloriang	Pani Taram	BJP	11,594	90.53	Kahfa Bengia	PPA	1,044	8.15	10,550
Upper Subansiri district
22	Nacho	Nakap Nalo	BJP	5,415	57.08	Tanga Byaling	INC	4,042	42.61	1,373
23	Taliha	Nyato Rigia	BJP	Elected unopposed						
24	Daporijo	Taniya Soki	BJP	6,671	49.7	Dikto Yekar	NPP	6,443	48	228
Kamle district
25	Raga	Rotom Tebin	BJP	8,791	59.91	Ajay Murtem	NPP	5,857	39.91	2,934
Upper Subansiri district
26	Dumporijo	Rode Bui	BJP	6,400	57.01	Tabe Doni	NPP	4,809	42.84	1,591
West Siang district
27	Liromoba	Pesi Jilen	NPP	7,206	56.55	Nyamar Karbak	BJP	5,508	43.22	1,698
Lower Siang district
28	Likabali	Kardo Nyigyor	BJP	6,607	62	Moli Riba	IND	4,002	37.55	2,605
Lepa Rada district
29	Basar	Nyabi Jini Dirchi	BJP	9,174	55.26	Gokar Basar	NPP	7,383	44.47	1,791
West Siang district
30	Along West	Topin Ete	BJP	7,629	57.1	Nyamo Ete	NPP	5,678	42.5	1,951
31	Along East	Kento Jini	BJP	7,380	63.39	Jarkar Gamlin	NPP	4,222	36.27	3,158
Siang district
32	Rumgong	Talem Taboh	BJP	5,862	52.48	Taja Bonung	NPP	4,680	41.89	1,182
Shi Yomi district
33	Mechuka	Pasang Dorjee Sona	BJP	6,320	62.42	Aju Chije	NCP	3,762	37.16	2,558
Upper Siang
34	Tuting-Yingkiong	Alo Libang	BJP	6,095	53.76	Nobeng Burung	PPA	5,180	45.69	915
Siang district
35	Pangin	Ojing Tasing	BJP	7,500	58.53	Tapang Taloh	NCP	4,906	38.16	2,594
Lower Siang district
36	Nari-Koyu	Tojir Kadu	BJP	4,545	60.59	Gegong Apang	IND	2,896	38.61	1,649
East Siang district
37	Pasighat West	Ninong Ering	BJP	8,049	59.5	Tapyam Pada	NCP	5,178	38.28	2,871
38	Pasighat East	Tapi Darang	NPP	9,070	50.4	Kaling Moyong	BJP	8,749	48.62	321
39	Mebo	Oken Tayeng	PPA	6,287	53.77	Lombo Tayeng	BJP	5,270	45.07	1,017
Upper Siang district
40	Mariyang-Geku	Oni Panyang	NPP	6,115	52.78	Olom Panyang	BJP	5,442	46.97	673
Dibang Valley district
41	Anini	Mopi Mihu	BJP	2,711	63.62	Eri Tayu	IND	1,538	36.09	1,173
Lower Dibang Valley district
42	Dambuk	Puinnyo Apum	BJP	6,009	49.17	Raju Tayeng	PPA	5,787	47.35	222
43	Roing	Mutchu Mithi	BJP	Elected unopposed						
Lohit district
44	Tezu	Mahesh Chai	BJP	8,535	51.7	Karikho Kri	NPP	5,730	34.71	2,805
Anjaw district
45	Hayuliang	Dasanglu Pul	BJP	Elected unopposed						
Namsai district
46	Chowkham	Chowna Mein	BJP	Elected unopposed						
47	Namsai	Zingnu Namchoom	BJP	14,540	68.88	Likha Saaya	NCP	5,984	28.35	8,556
48	Lekang	Likha Soni	NCP	7,804	45.28	Chow Sujana Namchoom	BJP	7,150	41.49	654
Changlang district
49	Bordumsa-Diyun	Nikh Kamin	NCP	10,497	51.04	Somlung Mossang	BJP	9,145	44.46	1,352
50	Miao	Kamlung Mossang	BJP	11,021	57.62	Chatu Longri	INC	7,894	41.27	3,127
51	Nampong	Laisam Simai	IND	3,180	36.06	Izmir Tikhak	BJP	3,112	35.29	68
52	Changlang South	Hamjongh Tangha	BJP	3,654	61.84	Timpu Ngemu	NPP	2,172	36.76	1,482
53	Changlang North	Tesam Pongte	BJP	4,524	51.81	Dihom Kitnya	NPP	2,522	28.88	2,002
Tirap district
54	Namsang	Wangki Lowang	BJP	3,781	49.65	Ngonglin Boi	NCP	3,725	48.92	56
55	Khonsa East	Wanglam Sawin	IND	4,544	55.82	Kamrang Tesia	BJP	2,328	28.6	2,216
56	Khonsa West	Chakat Aboh	BJP	4,093	40.08	Yang Sen Matey	NCP	4,289	32.2	804
57	Borduria-Bogapani	Wangling Lowangdong	BJP	4,731	57.19	Jowang Hosai	NCP	3,279	39.63	1,452
Longding district
58	Kanubari	Gabriel Denwang Wangsu	BJP	5,584	47.1	Panjam Wangsa	NPP	3,525	29.73	2,059
59	Longding-Pumao	Thangwang Wangham	NPP	6,702	50.45	Tanpho Wangnaw	BJP	6,533	49.18	169
60	Pongchau-Wakka	Honchun Ngandam	BJP	9,623	65.44	Holai Wangsa	IND	4,961	33.73	4,662
