= 2019 Arunachal Pradesh Legislative Assembly election =

Indian state election

Arunachal Pradesh Assembly Elections 2019
← 2014	April 11, 2019	2024 →

57 seats to Arunachal Pradesh Legislative Assembly ( 3 uncontested and won) 31 seats needed for a majority
- Turnout: 82.17%
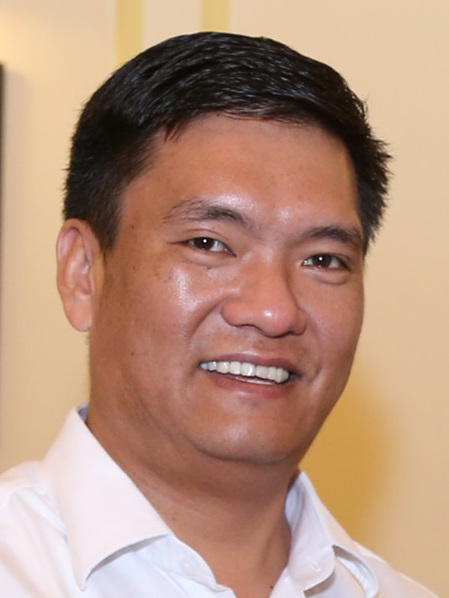

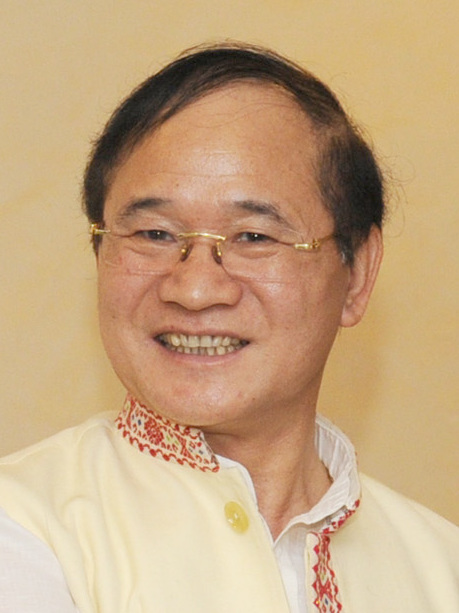

	First party	Second party	Third party
Leader	Pema Khandu		Gicho Kabak
Party	BJP	JD(U)	NPP
Alliance	NDA	NDA	NDA
Leader since	2016	-	-
Leader's seat	Mukto	-	Did not contest
Last election	11	New	New
Seats won	41	7	5
Seat change	▲30	New	New
Popular vote	3,15,540	61,325	90,347
Percentage	50.9%	9.89%	14.55%
Swing	▲20%	New	New
	Fourth party	Fifth party
Leader	Nabam Tuki	Kamen Ringu
Party	INC	PPA
Alliance	UPA	-
Leader's seat	Sagalee
Last election	42	5
Seats won	4	1
Seat change	▼38	▲1
Popular vote	1,04,540	10,714
Percentage	16.86%	1.71%
Swing	▼32.6%	▼7%
- Seatwise map of the results

- Structure of the Arunachal Pradesh Legislative Assembly after the election
Chief Minister before election
Pema Khandu
BJP
Elected Chief Minister
Pema Khandu
BJP

Legislative Assembly elections were held in Arunachal Pradesh on April 11 to elect the 60 members of Legislative Assembly. The term of Arunachal Pradesh Legislative Assembly ends on June 1, 2019. This resulted in a landslide victory for Bharatiya Janata Party and its allies. Pema Khandu took oath as Arunachal Pradesh Chief Minister on 29 May 2019.

== Parties contested ==
=== National Democratic Alliance ===
Party	Flag	Symbol	Leader	Seats contested
Bharatiya Janata Party			Pema Khandu	60

=== United Progressive Alliance ===
Party	Flag	Symbol	Leader	Seats contested
Indian National Congress			Nabam Tuki	46

=== National People's Party ===
Party	Flag	Symbol	Leader	Seats contested
National People's Party			Conrad Sangma	30

=== Janata Dal (United) ===
Party	Flag	Symbol	Leader	Seats contested
Janata Dal (United)			Nitish Kumar	15

=== People's Party of Arunachal ===
Party	Flag	Symbol	Leader	Seats contested
People's Party of Arunachal				9

== Results ==
Parties and Coalitions	Popular vote			Seats		
Parties and Coalitions	Vote	%	+/-	Contested	Won	+/-
Bharatiya Janata Party	315,540	50.86	▲19.89	60	41	▲30
Janata Dal (United)	61,325	9.88	▲9.88	15	7	▲7
National People's Party	90,347	14.56	▲14.56	30	5	▲5
Indian National Congress	104,540	16.85	▼32.65	46	4	▼38
People's Party of Arunachal	10,714	1.73	▼7.23	9	1	▼4
Janata Dal (Secular)	13,378	2.16	▲2.16	12	0	
All Indians Party	232	0.04	▲0.04	1	0	
Independents	18,528	2.99	▼1.93	11	2	Steady
None of the above	5,824	0.94	▼0.11	60		
Total	6,20,428	100.00		60	100.00	±0

=== By constituency ===
Three-member of the Bharatiya Janata Party, Phurpa Tsering from Dirang, Taba Tedir from Yachuli and Kento Jini from Along East were elected unopposed after others' candidature was rejected or the candidates withdrew themselves.

Results
Assembly Constituency		Winner			Runner Up			Margin
#	Name	Candidate	Party	Votes	Candidate	Party	Votes	Margin
1	Lumla	Jambey Tashi	Bharatiya Janata Party	4567	Jampa Thirnly Kunkhap	National People's Party	3279	1288
2	Tawang	Tsering Tashi	Bharatiya Janata Party	5547	Thupten Tempa	Indian National Congress	1955	3592
3	Mukto	Pema Khandu	Bharatiya Janata Party	4304	Thupten Kunphen	Indian National Congress	1685	2619
4	Dirang	Phurpa Tsering	Bharatiya Janata Party	Elected Unopposed				
5	Kalaktang	Dorjee Wangdi Kharma	Janata Dal (United)	5026	Tenzing Norbu Thongdok	Bharatiya Janata Party	3254	1772
6	Thrizino-Buragaon	Kumsi Sidisow	Bharatiya Janata Party	8772	Kalo Dususow	Indian National Congress	1637	7135
7	Bomdila	Dongru Siongju	Janata Dal (United)	2994	Japu Deru	Bharatiya Janata Party	2761	233
8	Bameng	Goruk Pordung	Bharatiya Janata Party	5043	Kumar Waii	National People's Party	4650	393
9	Chayangtajo	Hayeng Mangfi	Janata Dal (United)	5435	L K Yangfo	Bharatiya Janata Party	4801	634
10	Seppa East	Tapuk Taku	National People's Party	4184	Ealing Tallang	Bharatiya Janata Party	4155	29
11	Seppa West	Mama Natung	Bharatiya Janata Party	4059	Tani Loffa	Janata Dal (United)	2505	1554
12	Pakke-Kessang	Biyuram Wahge	Bharatiya Janata Party	4506	Atum Welly	Indian National Congress	2284	2222
13	Itanagar	Techi Kaso	Janata Dal (United)	12162	Kipa Babu	Bharatiya Janata Party	11860	302
14	Doimukh	Tana Hali Tara	Bharatiya Janata Party	8403	Nabam Vivek	National People's Party	6018	2385
15	Sagalee	Nabam Tuki	Indian National Congress	4886	Tarh Hari	National People's Party	3565	1321
16	Yachuli	Taba Tedir	Bharatiya Janata Party	Elected Unopposed				
17	Ziro-Hapoli	Tage Taki	Bharatiya Janata Party	9853	Nani Ribia	Indian National Congress	8079	1774
18	Palin	Balo Raja	Bharatiya Janata Party	5727	Takam Pario	Indian National Congress	4997	730
19	Nyapin	Bamang Felix	Bharatiya Janata Party	5517	Tai Nikio	Indian National Congress	5363	154
20	Tali	Jikke Tako	Janata Dal (United)	5518	Thaji Gichak Kiogi	Bharatiya Janata Party	5413	105
21	Koloriang	Lokam Tassar	Bharatiya Janata Party	5748	Pani Taram	National People's Party	5292	456
22	Nacho	Nakap Nalo	Bharatiya Janata Party	5053	Tanga Byaling	Indian National Congress	4355	698
23	Taliha	Nyato Rigia	Bharatiya Janata Party	5024	Rudham Sindhu	National People's Party	3821	1203
24	Daporijo	Taniya Soki	Bharatiya Janata Party	6019	Dikto Yekar	Janata Dal (United)	5897	122
25	Raga	Tarin Dapke	National People's Party	3229	Nido Pavitra	People's Party of Arunachal	3109	120
26	Dumporijo	Rode Bui	Bharatiya Janata Party	4635	Paknga Bage	National People's Party	3657	978
27	Liromoba	Nyamar Karbak	Bharatiya Janata Party	5616	Jarpum Gamlin	National People's Party	4870	746
28	Likabali	Kardo Nyigyor	People's Party of Arunachal	3714	Tapak Lendo	Bharatiya Janata Party	3536	178
29	Basar	Gokar Basar	National People's Party	6626	Gojen Gadi	Bharatiya Janata Party	6386	240
30	Along West	Tumke Bagra	Bharatiya Janata Party	6000	Topin Ete	Janata Dal (United)	5034	966
31	Along East	Kento Jini	Bharatiya Janata Party	Elected Unopposed				
32	Rumgong	Talem Taboh	Janata Dal (United)	4949	Tamiyo Taga	Bharatiya Janata Party	4864	85
33	Mechuka	Pasang Dorjee Sona	Bharatiya Janata Party	4261	Tori Ragyor	National People's Party	4193	68
34	Tuting-Yingkiong	Alo Libang	Bharatiya Janata Party	5800	Gegong Apang	Janata Dal (Secular)	4191	1609
35	Pangin	Ojing Tasing	Bharatiya Janata Party	7647	Tapang Taloh	Indian National Congress	3595	4052
36	Nari-Koyu	Kento Rina	Bharatiya Janata Party	2489	Tojir Kadu	Indian National Congress	2273	216
37	Pasighat West	Ninong Ering	Indian National Congress	5210	Tatung Jamoh	Bharatiya Janata Party	4639	571
38	Pasighat East	Kaling Moyong	Bharatiya Janata Party	8851	Bosiram Siram	Indian National Congress	7609	1242
39	Mebo	Lombo Tayeng	Indian National Congress	5238	Dangi Perme	Bharatiya Janata Party	4866	372
40	Mariyang-Geku	Kanggong Taku	Janata Dal (United)	5366	Anong Perme	Bharatiya Janata Party	4106	1260
41	Anini	Mopi Mihu	Bharatiya Janata Party	2416	Singe Milli	Indian National Congress	1282	1134
42	Dambuk	Gum Tayeng	Bharatiya Janata Party	5584	Tony Pertin	National People's Party	4711	873
43	Roing	Mutchu Mithi	National People's Party	4950	Laeta Umbrey	Bharatiya Janata Party	4550	400
44	Tezu	Karikho Kri	Independent	7538	Mahesh Chai	Bharatiya Janata Party	7383	200
45	Hayuliang	Dasanglu Pul	Bharatiya Janata Party	6149	Lupalum Kri	Indian National Congress	4817	1332
46	Chowkham	Chowna Mein	Bharatiya Janata Party	8908	Khunang Kri	Indian National Congress	1617	7291
47	Namsai	Chau Zingnu Namchoom	Bharatiya Janata Party	13392	Mualin Agan	National People's Party	2637	10755
48	Lekang	Jummum Ete Deori	Bharatiya Janata Party	8980	Takam Sanjoy	Indian National Congress	3487	5493
49	Bordumsa-Diyun	Somlung Mossang	Independent	6330	Jawra Maio	Bharatiya Janata Party	3951	2379
50	Miao	Kamlung Mossang	Bharatiya Janata Party	9760	Chatu Longri	Indian National Congress	5904	3856
51	Nampong	Laisam Simai	Bharatiya Janata Party	3761	Tainan James Jugli	National People's Party	2251	1510
52	Changlang South	Phosum Khimhun	Bharatiya Janata Party	2848	Latlang Tangha	Indian National Congress	2265	583
53	Changlang North	Tesam Pongte	Bharatiya Janata Party	5417	Thinghaap Taiju	Indian National Congress	2402	3015
54	Namsang	Wangki Lowang	Bharatiya Janata Party	3202	Ngonglin Boi	Indian National Congress	1520	1682
55	Khonsa East	Wanglam Sawin	Bharatiya Janata Party	5051	Danhang Phuksa	National People's Party	1670	3381
56	Khonsa West	Tirong Aboh	National People's Party	5366	Phawang Lowang	Bharatiya Janata Party	4311	1055
57	Borduria-Bagapani	Wanglin Lowangdong	Indian National Congress	2499	Jowang Hosai	Bharatiya Janata Party	2402	97
58	Kanubari	Gabriel Denwang Wangsu	Bharatiya Janata Party	6707	Nokchai Boham	Indian National Congress	2471	4236
59	Longding-Pumao	Tanpho Wangnaw	Bharatiya Janata Party	4463	Thangwang Wangham	National People's Party	3768	695
60	Pongchau-Wakka	Honchun Ngandam	Bharatiya Janata Party	6837	Thangkai Khusumchai	Indian National Congress	3099	3738

== Consequences ==
Some major political consequences were:

- National People's Party was accorded the status of National Party from Election Commission of India as it got 5 seats in the assembly with a vote share of 14.56% getting also the status of a Recognized State Party in Arunachal Pradesh.
- Janata Dal (United) party got the status of a Recognized State Party by the Election Commission of India as it secured 7 seats in the assembly winning a vote share of 9.88% in the state.

== See also ==
- 2019 elections in India
- 2019 Indian general election
- 2014 Arunachal Pradesh Legislative Assembly election
- Second Pema Khandu ministry
