= 2009 Arunachal Pradesh Legislative Assembly election =

- 13 October 2009

All 60 Assembly Constituencies
- Turnout: 72%
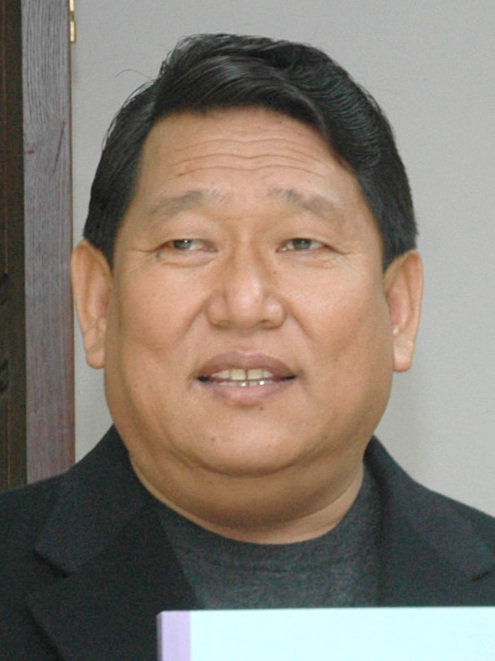

	First party	Second party	Third party
Leader	Dorjee Khandu
Party	INC	NCP	AITC
Alliance	UPA	UPA	UPA
Leader's seat	Mukto
Seats before	34	2	not contested
Seats won	42	5	5
Seat change	▲8	▲3	▲5
Popular vote	2,89,501	1,11,098	86,406
Percentage	50.38%	19.33%	15.04%
Swing	▲5.97%	▲15.05%	▲15.04%
	Fourth party	Fifth party
Party	PPA	BJP
Alliance	-	NDA
Seats before	not contested	9
Seats won	4	3
Seat change	▲4	▼6
Popular vote	41,780	29,929
Percentage	7.27%	5.21%
Swing	▲7.27%	▼13.79%
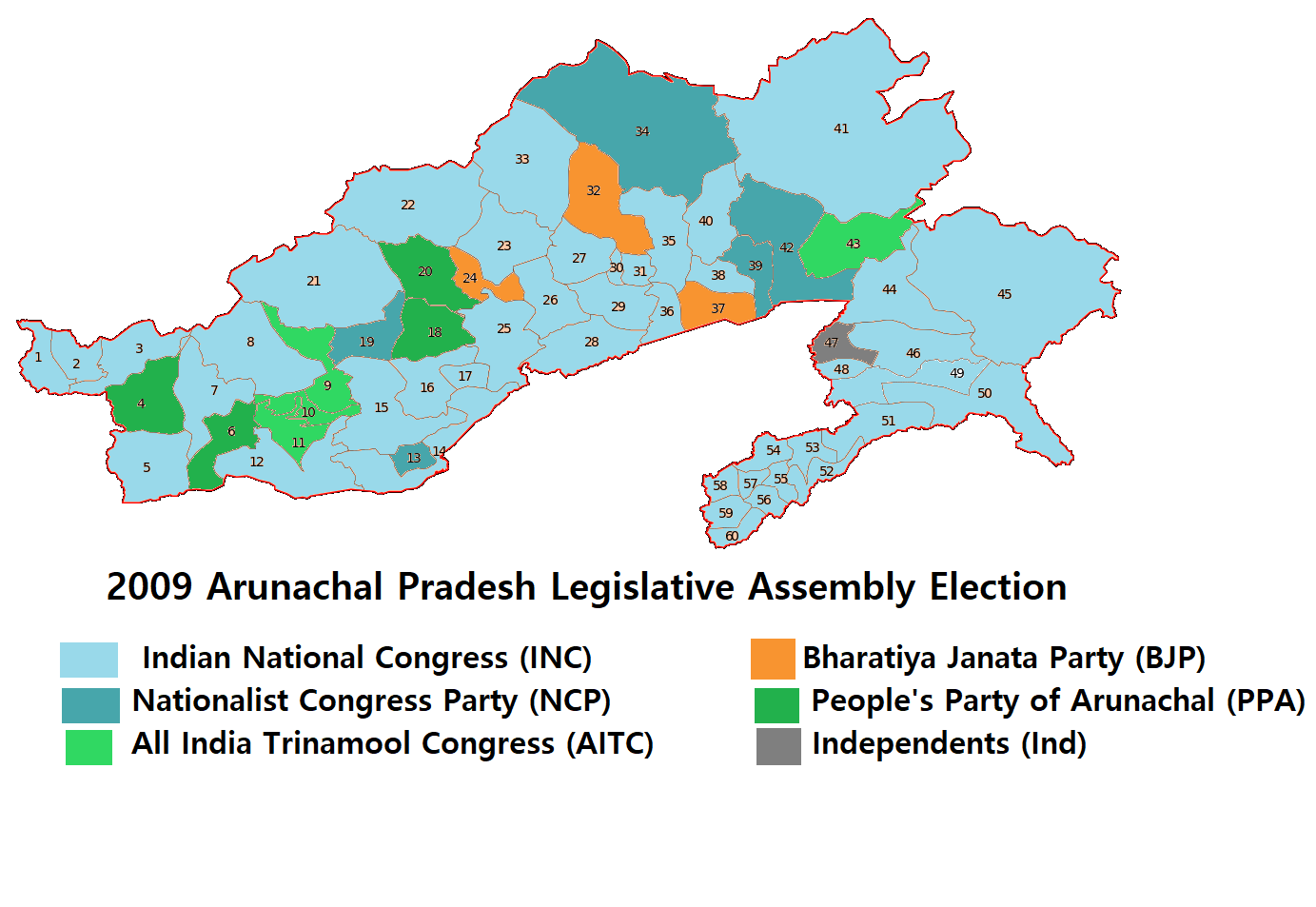
- Seatwise map of the results
CM before election
Dorjee Khandu
INC
CM-elect
Dorjee Khandu
INC

The 2009 Arunachal Pradesh Legislative Assembly election took place in October 2009, concurrently with the assembly elections in Maharashtra and Haryana. The elections were held in the state for all 60 Assembly seats on 13 October 2009. The results were declared on 22 October 2009. Chief Minister Dorjee Khandu's Indian National Congress party came back to power in the state with an increased majority, winning 42 seats in the 60 seat Assembly.

== Previous Assembly ==
In the 2004 Arunachal Pradesh Assembly election, Congress won 34 of the 60 seats and Congress leader Gegong Apang was elected as the Congress Legislative Party and was sworn in as the Chief Minister. Apang had defected from the Bharatiya Janata Party just a few weeks before the election. The BJP won win 9 seats.

However, in April 2007, 29 Congress legislators formally supported a change of leadership in the state Congress. The dissidents also claimed support from 2 NCP, 1 Arunachal Congress and 11 independent legislators. Apang, Arunachal's longest serving chief minister, was forced to step down on 9 April 2007 when the Congress legislators elected Power Minister Dorjee Khandu as the new Congress Legislative Party leader. Khandu was sworn in as the state's seventh Chief Minister by Nagaland Governor K. Sankaranarayanan on 10 April 2007.

In June of the same year, Khandu's Government received further strengthening when 8 out of the 9 BJP MLAs joined Congress, taking the strength of the party to 41.

== Background ==
The tenure of the Arunachal Pradesh Assembly was scheduled to expire on 24 October 2009. So the Election Commission of India announced on 31 August 2009 that the election to the Arunachal Pradesh Assembly would be held in October 2009.

Though Nationalist Congress Party and All India Trinamool Congress were Congress' allies at the Centre, in Arunachal Pradesh, they fought the election against Congress. The BJP was also in the fray in Arunachal, having formed their 1st Government in the North-East after Apang and his supporters had joined the BJP in August 2003.

== Schedule ==
Poll Event	Dates
Announcement & Issue of Press Note	Monday, 31 Aug 2009
Issue of Notification	Friday, 18 Sep 2009
Last Date for filing Nominations	Friday, 25 Sep 2009
Scrutiny of Nominations	Saturday, 26 Sep 2009
Last date for withdrawal of Candidature	Tuesday, 29 Sep 2009
Date of Poll	Tuesday, 13 Oct 2009
Counting of Votes on	Thursday, 22 Oct 2009
Date of election being completed	Sunday, 25 Oct 2009
Constituencies Polling on this day	60
Source: Election Commission of India

== Parties contested ==
Party	Flag	Symbol	Leader	Seats contested
Indian National Congress			Nabam Tuki	60
Nationalist Congress Party			P. A. Sangma	36
All India Trinamool Congress			Mamata Banerjee	26
Bharatiya Janata Party			Kiren Rijiju	18
People's Party of Arunachal				11

== Results ==
Summary of the Arunachal Pradesh Legislative Assembly election result
Parties and Coalitions	Popular vote			Seats		
Parties and Coalitions	Vote	%	+/-	Contested	Won	+/-
Indian National Congress	2,89,501	50.38		60	42	
Nationalist Congress Party	1,11,098	19.33		36	5	
All India Trinamool Congress	86,406	15.04		26	5	
People's Party of Arunachal	41,780	7.27		11	4	
Bharatiya Janata Party	29,929	5.21		18	3	
Janata Dal (United)	3,584	0.62		3	0	
Independents	12,364	2.15		3	1	
Total	5,74,662	100.00		60	100.00	±0

=== By constituency ===
Results
Assembly Constituency		Winner			Runner Up			Margin
#	Name	Candidate	Party	Votes	Candidate	Party	Votes	Margin
1	Lumla	Jambey Tashi	Indian National Congress	Elected Unopposed				
2	Tawang	Tsewang Dhondup	Indian National Congress	Elected Unopposed				
3	Mukto	Dorjee Khandu	Indian National Congress	Elected Unopposed				
4	Dirang	Phurpa Tsering	People's Party of Arunachal	6618	Tsering Gyurme	Indian National Congress	5085	1533
5	Kalaktang	Tenzing Norbu Thongdok	Indian National Congress	4189	Rinchin Khandu Khrimey	Nationalist Congress Party	2958	1231
6	Thrizino-Buragaon	Kumsi Sidisow	People's Party of Arunachal	8279	Naresh Glow	Indian National Congress	3281	4998
7	Bomdila	R T Khunjuju	Indian National Congress	4062	Japu Deru	Nationalist Congress Party	3670	392
8	Bameng	Kumar Waii	Indian National Congress	5647	Tagung Neri	All India Trinamool Congress	2283	3364
9	Chayangtajo	Karya Bagang	All India Trinamool Congress	3674	Kameng Dolo	Indian National Congress	3332	342
10	Seppa East	Tapuk Taku	All India Trinamool Congress	4666	Tame Phassang	Indian National Congress	4374	292
11	Seppa West	Tani Loffa	All India Trinamool Congress	2783	Mama Natung	Indian National Congress	2472	311
12	Pakke-Kessang	Atum Welly	Indian National Congress	2885	Techi Hemu	Nationalist Congress Party	2818	67
13	Itanagar	Techi Kaso	Nationalist Congress Party	13443	Kipa Babu	Indian National Congress	10057	3386
14	Doimukh	Nabam Rebia	Indian National Congress	6752	Ngurang Pinch	Nationalist Congress Party	6154	598
15	Sagalee	Nabam Tuki	Indian National Congress	6646	Tad Tana	Nationalist Congress Party	2954	3692
16	Yachuli	Likha Saaya	Indian National Congress	5638	Nikh Kamin	All India Trinamool Congress	5596	42
17	Ziro-Hapoli	Padi Richo	Indian National Congress	9569	Nani Ribia	All India Trinamool Congress	6697	2872
18	Palin	Takam Tagar	People's Party of Arunachal	6015	Balo Raja	Indian National Congress	5326	689
19	Nyapin	Bamang Felix	Nationalist Congress Party	4865	Tatar Kipa	Indian National Congress	4126	739
20	Tali	Markio Tado	People's Party of Arunachal	5261	Takam Sorang	Indian National Congress	2548	2713
21	Koloriang	Lokam Tassar	Indian National Congress	5095	Kahfa Bengia	Nationalist Congress Party	3996	1099
22	Nacho	Tanga Byaling	Indian National Congress	4878	Ajit Nacho	Bharatiya Janata Party	1052	3826
23	Taliha	Punji Mara	Indian National Congress	3570	Nyato Rigia	All India Trinamool Congress	3164	406
24	Daporijo	Tapen Siga	Bharatiya Janata Party	5009	Yari Dulom	Indian National Congress	3806	1203
25	Raga	Nido Pavitra	Indian National Congress	5460	Aath Tacho Kabak	Nationalist Congress Party	4274	1186
26	Dumporijo	Takar Marde	Indian National Congress	7493	Paknga Bage	Independent	1735	5758
27	Liromoba	Jarbom Gamlin	Indian National Congress	6640	Bai Gadi	Bharatiya Janata Party	2748	3892
28	Likabali	Jomde Kena	Indian National Congress	3420	Yai Mara	All India Trinamool Congress	2527	893
29	Basar	Gojen Gadi	Indian National Congress	8438	Dakter Basar	All India Trinamool Congress	5317	3121
30	Along West	Gadam Ete	Indian National Congress	5113	Duter Padu	All India Trinamool Congress	5082	31
31	Along East	Jarkar Gamlin	Indian National Congress	5175	Yomto Jini	All India Trinamool Congress	4576	599
32	Rumgong	Tamiyo Taga	Bharatiya Janata Party	3658	Karma Jerang	Janata Dal (United)	2915	743
33	Mechuka	Pasang Dorjee Sona	Indian National Congress	3973	Tsering Naksang	Nationalist Congress Party	2423	1550
34	Tuting-Yingkiong	Alo Libang	Nationalist Congress Party	4827	Gegong Apang	Indian National Congress	3457	1370
35	Pangin	Tapang Taloh	Indian National Congress	6826	Kaling Jerang	Nationalist Congress Party	4045	2781
36	Nari-Koyu	Tako Dabi	Indian National Congress	3398	Kenyir Ringu	Nationalist Congress Party	2656	742
37	Pasighat West	Tangor Tapak	Bharatiya Janata Party	5529	Omak Apang	Indian National Congress	4868	661
38	Pasighat East	Bosiram Siram	Indian National Congress	8908	Kaling Moyong	Nationalist Congress Party	5683	3225
39	Mebo	Ralom Borang	Nationalist Congress Party	5142	Lombo Tayeng	Indian National Congress	4555	587
40	Mariyang-Geku	J K Panggeng	Indian National Congress	4165	Raising Perme	Nationalist Congress Party	2885	1280
41	Anini	Rajesh Tacho	Indian National Congress	1730	Eri Tayu	Nationalist Congress Party	1649	81
42	Dambuk	Jomin Tayeng	Nationalist Congress Party	4967	Roding Pertin	Indian National Congress	4837	130
43	Roing	Laeta Umbrey	All India Trinamool Congress	5170	Pomoya Mithi	Indian National Congress	4337	833
44	Tezu	Karikho Kri	Indian National Congress	8397	Nakul Chai	All India Trinamool Congress	4552	3845
45	Hayuliang	Kalikho Pul	Indian National Congress	7788	Baritlum Ama	All India Trinamool Congress	998	6790
46	Chowkham	Chow Tewa Mein	Indian National Congress	6279	Chow Chinakong Namchoom	Nationalist Congress Party	4023	2256
47	Namsai	Nang Sati Mein	Independent	10447	Chow Pingthika Namchoom	All India Trinamool Congress	4778	5699
48	Lekang	Chowna Mein	Indian National Congress	6896	James Techi Tara	Nationalist Congress Party	3950	2946
49	Bordumsa-Diyun	C C Singpho	Indian National Congress	6193	Khumral Lungphi	Nationalist Congress Party	5238	955
50	Miao	Kamlung Mossang	Indian National Congress	9151	Samchom Ngemu	Nationalist Congress Party	6180	2971
51	Nampong	Setong Sena	Indian National Congress	5432	Tosham Mossang	Independent	1582	3850
52	Changlang South	Phosum Khimhun	Indian National Congress	2904	Tengam Ngemu	All India Trinamool Congress	950	1954
53	Changlang North	Thinghaap Taiju	Indian National Congress	4088	Wangnia Pongte	All India Trinamool Congress	2834	1254
54	Namsang	Wangki Lowang	Indian National Congress	4968	Wanglong Rajkumar	Nationalist Congress Party	2275	2693
55	Khonsa East	Kamthok Lowang	All India Trinamool Congress	3475	T.L. Rajkumar	Indian National Congress	3020	455
56	Khonsa West	Yumsem Matey	Indian National Congress	4030	Thajam Aboh	All India Trinamool Congress	3562	468
57	Borduria-Bagapani	Wanglin Lowangdong	Indian National Congress	4034	Tonhang Tongluk	Nationalist Congress Party	1908	2126
58	Kanubari	Newlai Tingkhatra	Indian National Congress	4859	Gabriel Denwang Wangsu	People's Party of Arunachal	4189	670
59	Longding-Pumao	Thangwang Wangham	Indian National Congress	4763	Tanpho Wangnaw	People's Party of Arunachal	4178	585
60	Pongchau-Wakka	Honchun Ngandam	Indian National Congress	7531	Anok Wangsa	People's Party of Arunachal	2976	4555

== Government Formation ==
The Congress party won 42 of the 60 seats in the Assembly, including 3 uncontested seats - Dorjee Khandu from Mukto, Tsewang Dhondup from Tawang and Jambey Tashi from Lumla. Seasoned Congressman, seven times MLA and former chief minister, Gegong Apang, and his son Omak Apang both lost the elections. While Gegong lost to Nationalist Congress Party, his son was defeated by Bharatiya Janata Party candidate. Without the competition from Gegong, Dorjee Khandu was smoothly elected as the Congress Legislative Party leader on 24 October 2009.

Khandu was sworn in for his 2nd term as the Chief Minister by Governor Joginder Jaswant Singh at the Darbar Hall of the Itanagar Raj Bhawan on 25 October 2009.

== See also ==
- State Assembly elections in India, 2009
