= 2014 Arunachal Pradesh Legislative Assembly election =

Arunachal Pradesh Assembly Elections 2014
← 2009	9 April 2014	2019 →

60
- Turnout: 80.78%
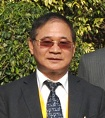

	First party	Second party	Third party
Leader	Nabam Tuki
Party	INC	BJP	PPA
Alliance	UPA	NDA	NDA
Leader since	2011
Leader's seat	Sagalee	none	none
Last election	2009	2009
Seats before	42	3	4
Seats won	42	11	5
Seat change	Steady	▲8	▲1
Popular vote	251575	157412	45,532
Percentage	49.5 %	30.97 %	8.96 %
Swing	▼0.88 %	▲25.76 %	▲1.69 %
- Seatwise map of the results

- Structure of the Arunachal Pradesh Legislative Assembly after the election
Chief Minister before election
Nabam Tuki
INC
Elected Chief Minister
Nabam Tuki
INC

The Arunachal Pradesh Legislative Assembly election, 2014 took place on 9 April 2014 along with the parliamentary election 2014. The votes were counted on 16 May 2014. The election was held in the state for all 60 seats of the Arunachal Pradesh Legislative Assembly.

In this elections a total of 19 first - timers elected as MLA's.

== Parties contested ==
=== United Progressive Alliance ===
Party	Flag	Symbol	Leader	Seats contested
Indian National Congress			Nabam Tuki	60

=== National Democratic Alliance ===
Party	Flag	Symbol	Leader	Seats contested
Bharatiya Janata Party			Kiren Rijiju	42
People's Party of Arunachal				16

== Results ==
INC won the election by winning 42 seats out of 60 and BJP won 11 seats.

Summary of the Arunachal Pradesh Legislative Assembly election result
Parties and Coalitions	Popular vote			Seats		
Parties and Coalitions	Vote	%	+/-	Contested	Won	+/-
Indian National Congress	2,51,575	49.50	▼0.88	60	42	Steady
Bharatiya Janata Party	1,57,412	30.97	▲25.76	42	11	▲8
People's Party of Arunachal	45,532	8.96	▲1.69	16	5	▲1
Nationalist Congress Party	19505	3.84	▼15.49	9	0	▼5
Naga People's Front	3,788	0.75	▲0.75	11	0	
Aam Aadmi Party	142	0.03	▲0.03	1	0	
Independents	24,985	4.92	▲2.77	16	2	▲1
None of the above	5,322	1.05	▲1.05	60		
Total	5,08,261	100.00		60	100.00	±0

=== By constituency ===
Results
Assembly Constituency		Winner			Runner Up			Margin
#	Name	Candidate	Party	Votes	Candidate	Party	Votes	Margin
1	Lumla	Jambey Tashi	Indian National Congress	4254	Theg Tse Rinpoche	Independent	2755	1499
2	Tawang	Tsering Tashi	Independent	6421	Tsewang Dhondup	Indian National Congress	1367	5054
3	Mukto	Pema Khandu	Indian National Congress	Elected Unopposed				
4	Dirang	Phurpa Tsering	Indian National Congress	Elected Unopposed				
5	Kalaktang	Tenzing Norbu Thongdok	Indian National Congress	4110	Tsering Sonam	People's Party of Arunachal	3401	709
6	Thrizino-Buragaon	Kumsi Sidisow	Indian National Congress	7873	Gandhi Sakrinsow	Bharatiya Janata Party	2790	5083
7	Bomdila	Japu Deru	Bharatiya Janata Party	4345	R T Khunjuju	Indian National Congress	3660	685
8	Bameng	Kumar Waii	Indian National Congress	5080	Vijay Sonam	Bharatiya Janata Party	3221	1859
9	Chayangtajo	Karya Bagang	Indian National Congress	4343	L K Yangfo	Bharatiya Janata Party	3928	415
10	Seppa East	Tapuk Taku	Indian National Congress	5134	Lelung Lingfa	Bharatiya Janata Party	2366	2768
11	Seppa West	Mama Natung	Indian National Congress	Elected Unopposed				
12	Pakke-Kessang	Kameng Dolo	Indian National Congress	Elected Unopposed				
13	Itanagar	Techi Kaso	Indian National Congress	18790	Tame Phassang	Bharatiya Janata Party	13949	4841
14	Doimukh	Nabam Rebia	Indian National Congress	Elected Unopposed				
15	Sagalee	Nabam Tuki	Indian National Congress	Elected Unopposed				
16	Yachuli	Likha Saaya	Indian National Congress	6685	Taba Nirmali	Nationalist Congress Party	6615	70
17	Ziro-Hapoli	Tage Taki	Bharatiya Janata Party	8885	Padi Richo	Indian National Congress	7666	1219
18	Palin	Takam Pario	Indian National Congress	Elected Unopposed				
19	Nyapin	Bamang Felix	Indian National Congress	Elected Unopposed				
20	Tali	Markio Tado	Indian National Congress	4762	Thaji Gichak Kiogi	Nationalist Congress Party	3949	813
21	Koloriang	Pani Taram	People's Party of Arunachal	4974	Lokam Tassar	Indian National Congress	4697	277
22	Nacho	Tanga Byaling	Indian National Congress	Elected Unopposed				
23	Taliha	Punji Mara	Indian National Congress	Elected Unopposed				
24	Daporijo	Dikto Yekar	Indian National Congress	6278	Tapen Siga	Bharatiya Janata Party	6241	37
25	Raga	Tamar Murtem	Bharatiya Janata Party	6401	Nido Pavitra	Indian National Congress	6380	21
26	Dumporijo	Paknga Bage	Independent	5500	Takar Marde	Indian National Congress	4143	1357
27	Liromoba	Jarbom Gamlin	Indian National Congress	5483	Bai Gadi	Bharatiya Janata Party	4179	1304
28	Likabali	Jomde Kena	Indian National Congress	3524	Yai Mara	Independent	2972	552
29	Basar	Gojen Gadi	Indian National Congress	7206	Togo Basar	People's Party of Arunachal	5407	1799
30	Along West	Tumke Bagra	Bharatiya Janata Party	6312	Gadam Ete	Indian National Congress	3726	2586
31	Along East	Jarkar Gamlin	Indian National Congress	4409	Tummar Bagra	Nationalist Congress Party	3477	932
32	Rumgong	Tamiyo Taga	Bharatiya Janata Party	4609	Talem Taboh	Indian National Congress	4419	190
33	Mechuka	Pasang Dorjee Sona	People's Party of Arunachal	3825	Tori Ragyor	Indian National Congress	3779	46
34	Tuting-Yingkiong	Alo Libang	Indian National Congress	4834	Gegong Apang	Bharatiya Janata Party	4470	364
35	Pangin	Tapang Taloh	Indian National Congress	5652	Ojing Tasing	Bharatiya Janata Party	5046	606
36	Nari-Koyu	Kento Rina	Bharatiya Janata Party	3264	Tako Dabi	Indian National Congress	2875	389
37	Pasighat West	Tatung Jamoh	Indian National Congress	5589	Tangor Tapak	Bharatiya Janata Party	4755	834
38	Pasighat East	Kaling Moyong	Bharatiya Janata Party	7664	Bosiram Siram	Indian National Congress	7614	50
39	Mebo	Lombo Tayeng	Indian National Congress	Elected Unopposed				
40	Mariyang-Geku	Olom Panyang	Bharatiya Janata Party	4198	J K Panggeng	Indian National Congress	4189	9
41	Anini	Rajesh Tacho	Indian National Congress	1829	Eri Tayu	Bharatiya Janata Party	1637	192
42	Dambuk	Gum Tayeng	Indian National Congress	5473	Roding Pertin	Bharatiya Janata Party	4284	1189
43	Roing	Mutchu Mithi	Indian National Congress	5434	Laeta Umbrey	People's Party of Arunachal	3249	2185
44	Tezu	Mahesh Chai	Bharatiya Janata Party	7147	Karikho Kri	Indian National Congress	6666	481
45	Hayuliang	Kalikho Pul	Indian National Congress	7272	Banim Kri	Bharatiya Janata Party	1502	5770
46	Chowkham	Chow Tewa Mein	Indian National Congress	5578	Sotai Kri	Bharatiya Janata Party	2684	2894
47	Namsai	Zingnu Namchoom	Indian National Congress	10402	Chow Pingthika Namchoom	Bharatiya Janata Party	6091	4311
48	Lekang	Chowna Mein	Indian National Congress	6337	Bida Taku	People's Party of Arunachal	5158	1179
49	Bordumsa-Diyun	Nikh Kamin	People's Party of Arunachal	5309	C C Singpho	Indian National Congress	3981	1328
50	Miao	Kamlung Mossang	Indian National Congress	8806	Chomjong Haidley	Bharatiya Janata Party	4982	3824
51	Nampong	Laisam Simai	Bharatiya Janata Party	3529	Setong Sena	Indian National Congress	3326	203
52	Changlang South	Phosum Khimhun	Indian National Congress	3235	John Jugli	Nationalist Congress Party	1241	1994
53	Changlang North	Tesam Pongte	Bharatiya Janata Party	3486	Thinghaap Taiju	Indian National Congress	2449	1037
54	Namsang	Wangki Lowang	Indian National Congress	2956	Wanglong Rajkumar	Bharatiya Janata Party	2040	916
55	Khonsa East	Wanglam Sawin	People's Party of Arunachal	3169	T.L. Rajkumar	Bharatiya Janata Party	2292	877
56	Khonsa West	Tirong Aboh	People's Party of Arunachal	3898	Yumsem Matey	Indian National Congress	1990	1908
57	Borduria-Bagapani	Wanglin Lowangdong	Indian National Congress	2253	Lowangcha Wanglat	Bharatiya Janata Party	1939	314
58	Kanubari	Newlai Tingkhatra	Indian National Congress	3383	Rongnai Maham	Bharatiya Janata Party	3334	49
59	Longding-Pumao	Thangwang Wangham	Indian National Congress	4341	Tanpho Wangnaw	Bharatiya Janata Party	3966	375
60	Pongchau-Wakka	Honchun Ngandam	Indian National Congress	5432	Longwang Wangham	People's Party of Arunachal	3394	2038

== Bypolls (2014-2019) ==
S.No	Date	Constituency	MLA before election	Party before election	Elected MLA	Party after election
58	15 October 2014	Kanubari	Newlai Tingkhatra	Indian National Congress	Gabriel Denwang Wangsu	Indian National Congress
27	13 February 2015	Liromba	Jarbom Gamlin	Indian National Congress	Nyamar Karbak	Indian National Congress
15	19 November 2016	Hayuliang	Kalikho Pul	People's Party of Arunachal	Dasanglu Pul	Bharatiya Janata Party
12	21 December 2017	Pakke-Kessang	Kameng Dolo	Indian National Congress	Biyuram Wahge	Bharatiya Janata Party
28	21 December 2017	Likabali	Jomde Kena	Indian National Congress	Kardo Nayigyor	Bharatiya Janata Party
