= Longding–Pumao Assembly constituency =

Legislative Assembly constituency in Arunachal Pradesh State, India

Coordinates: 26.87°N 95.31°E

Longding-Pumao
- Constituency No. 59 for the Arunachal Pradesh Legislative Assembly

Constituency details
- Country: India
- Region: Northeast India
- State: Arunachal Pradesh
- District: Longding
- Lok Sabha constituency: Arunachal East
- Established: 1990
- Total electors: 14,607
- Reservation: ST

Member of Legislative Assembly
- 11th Arunachal Pradesh Legislative Assembly
- Incumbent Thangwang Wangham
- Party: NPP
- Alliance: NDA
- Elected year: 2024

Longding-Pumao is one of the 60 Legislative Assembly constituencies of Arunachal Pradesh state in India.

It is part of Longding district and is reserved for candidates belonging to the Scheduled Tribes.

== Members of the Legislative Assembly ==
Election	Name	Party
1990	Langfu Lukham	Independent politician
1995	Tingpong Wangham	Independent politician
1999	Tingpong Wangham	Indian National Congress
2004	Thangwang Wangham	Nationalist Congress Party
2009	Thangwang Wangham	Indian National Congress
2014	Thangwang Wangham	Indian National Congress
2019	Tanpho Wangnaw	Bharatiya Janata Party
2024	Thangwang Wangham	National People's Party

== Election results ==
=== Assembly Election 2024 ===
2024 Arunachal Pradesh Legislative Assembly election : Longding–Pumao
Party	Candidate	Votes	%	±%
NPP	Thangwang Wangham	6,702	50.45%	▲14.68
BJP	Tanpho Wangnaw	6,533	49.18%	▲6.81
NOTA	None of the Above	49	0.37%	▼0.55
Margin of victory		169	1.27%	▼5.33
Turnout		13,284	90.94%	▲0.78
Registered electors		14,607		▲25.03
NPP gain from BJP		Swing	▲8.08	

=== Assembly Election 2019 ===
2019 Arunachal Pradesh Legislative Assembly election : Longding–Pumao
Party	Candidate	Votes	%	±%
BJP	Tanpho Wangnaw	4,463	42.37%	▼1.56
NPP	Thangwang Wangham	3,768	35.77%	New
INC	Noksa Saham	1,503	14.27%	▼33.82
JD(S)	Wangshu Wangsu	467	4.43%	New
PPA	Chiknga Wangpan	236	2.24%	▼0.78
NOTA	None of the Above	97	0.92%	▼0.81
Margin of victory		695	6.60%	▲2.44
Turnout		10,534	90.17%	▲0.26
Registered electors		11,683		▲16.34
BJP gain from INC		Swing	▼5.72	

=== Assembly Election 2014 ===
2014 Arunachal Pradesh Legislative Assembly election : Longding–Pumao
Party	Candidate	Votes	%	±%
INC	Thangwang Wangham	4,341	48.08%	▼5.19
BJP	Tanpho Wangnaw	3,966	43.93%	New
NCP	Pongsa Saham	292	3.23%	New
PPA	Ngamkhah Wangnao	273	3.02%	▼43.70
NOTA	None of the Above	156	1.73%	New
Margin of victory		375	4.15%	▼2.39
Turnout		9,028	89.90%	▼1.76
Registered electors		10,042		▲2.95
INC hold		Swing	▼5.19	

=== Assembly Election 2009 ===
2009 Arunachal Pradesh Legislative Assembly election : Longding–Pumao
Party	Candidate	Votes	%	±%
INC	Thangwang Wangham	4,763	53.27%	▲23.47
PPA	Tanpho Wangnaw	4,178	46.73%	New
Margin of victory		585	6.54%	▲1.38
Turnout		8,941	91.66%	▲7.52
Registered electors		9,754		▲11.77
INC gain from NCP		Swing		

=== Assembly Election 2004 ===
2004 Arunachal Pradesh Legislative Assembly election : Longding–Pumao
Party	Candidate	Votes	%	±%
NCP	Thangwang Wangham	2,567	34.96%	▲6.36
INC	Tingpong Wangham	2,188	29.80%	▼9.01
Independent	Tanpho Wangnaw	1,603	21.83%	New
BJP	Pongsa Saham	856	11.66%	▲4.75
AC	Tingjem Wangsu	129	1.76%	New
Margin of victory		379	5.16%	▼5.04
Turnout		7,343	83.11%	▲4.32
Registered electors		8,727		▲5.31
NCP gain from INC		Swing	▼3.85	

=== Assembly Election 1999 ===
1999 Arunachal Pradesh Legislative Assembly election : Longding–Pumao
Party	Candidate	Votes	%	±%
INC	Tingpong Wangham	2,567	38.81%	▲1.93
NCP	Thangwang Wangham	1,892	28.60%	New
Independent	Tanpho Wangnaw	1,699	25.68%	New
BJP	Tingjem Wangsu	457	6.91%	New
Margin of victory		675	10.20%	▼16.05
Turnout		6,615	82.67%	▼8.21
Registered electors		8,287		▲8.21
INC gain from Independent		Swing	▼24.32	

=== Assembly Election 1995 ===
1995 Arunachal Pradesh Legislative Assembly election : Longding–Pumao
Party	Candidate	Votes	%	±%
Independent	Tingpong Wangham	4,256	63.13%	New
INC	Langfu Lukham	2,486	36.87%	▲17.75
Margin of victory		1,770	26.25%	▲25.88
Turnout		6,742	90.06%	▲16.97
Registered electors		7,658		▲0.58
Independent hold		Swing		

=== Assembly Election 1990 ===
1990 Arunachal Pradesh Legislative Assembly election : Longding–Pumao
Party	Candidate	Votes	%	±%
Independent	Langfu Lukham	1,692	31.27%	New
JD	Tingpong Wanghan	1,672	30.90%	New
INC	Hejam Ponglaham	1,035	19.13%	New
Independent	Pantun Pansa	1,012	18.70%	New
Margin of victory		20	0.37%	
Turnout		5,411	72.20%	
Registered electors		7,614		
Independent win (new seat)				

== See also ==
- List of constituencies of the Arunachal Pradesh Legislative Assembly
- Longding district
