= Sagalee Assembly constituency =

Legislative Assembly constituency in Arunachal Pradesh State, India

Coordinates: 27.25°N 93.49°E

Sagalee
- Constituency No. 15 for the Arunachal Pradesh Legislative Assembly

Constituency details
- Country: India
- Region: Northeast India
- State: Arunachal Pradesh
- District: Papum Pare
- Lok Sabha constituency: Arunachal West
- Established: 1990
- Total electors: 14,625
- Reservation: ST

Member of Legislative Assembly
- 11th Arunachal Pradesh Legislative Assembly
- Incumbent Ratu Techi
- Party: Bharatiya Janata Party
- Elected year: 2024

Sagalee is one of the 60 Legislative Assembly constituencies of Arunachal Pradesh state in India.

It is part of Papum Pare district and is reserved for candidates belonging to the Scheduled Tribes.

== Members of the Legislative Assembly ==
Year	Name	Party
1990	Taba Haniya	Janata Dal
1995	Nabam Tuki	Indian National Congress
1999	Nabam Tuki	Indian National Congress
2004	Nabam Tuki	Indian National Congress
2009	Nabam Tuki	Indian National Congress
2014	Nabam Tuki	Indian National Congress
2019	Nabam Tuki	Indian National Congress
2024	Ratu Techi (Note: Elected unopposed)	Bharatiya Janata Party

== Election results ==
=== Assembly Election 2024 ===
2024 Arunachal Pradesh Legislative Assembly election: Sagalee
Party	Candidate	Votes	%	±%
BJP	Ratu Techi	Unopposed		
Registered electors		14,625		▲14.71
BJP gain from INC		Swing		

=== Assembly Election 2019 ===
2019 Arunachal Pradesh Legislative Assembly election: Sagalee
Party	Candidate	Votes	%	±%
INC	Nabam Tuki	4,886	44.86%	New
NPP	Tarh Hari	3,565	32.73%	New
BJP	Dominic Tadar	2,385	21.90%	New
NOTA	None of the Above	56	0.51%	New
Margin of victory		1,321	12.13%	
Turnout		10,892	85.43%	▲85.43
Registered electors		12,750		▲1.09
INC hold		Swing		

=== Assembly Election 2014 ===
2014 Arunachal Pradesh Legislative Assembly election: Sagalee
Party	Candidate	Votes	%	±%
INC	Nabam Tuki	Unopposed		
Registered electors		12,613		▲5.06
INC hold		Swing		

=== Assembly Election 2009 ===
2009 Arunachal Pradesh Legislative Assembly election: Sagalee
Party	Candidate	Votes	%	±%
INC	Nabam Tuki	6,646	69.23%	New
NCP	Sri Tad Tana	2,954	30.77%	New
Margin of victory		3,692	38.46%	
Turnout		9,600	79.97%	▲79.97
Registered electors		12,005		▲11.03
INC hold		Swing		

=== Assembly Election 2004 ===
2004 Arunachal Pradesh Legislative Assembly election: Sagalee
Party	Candidate	Votes	%	±%
INC	Nabam Tuki	Unopposed		
Registered electors		10,812		▲17.73
INC hold		Swing		

=== Assembly Election 1999 ===
1999 Arunachal Pradesh Legislative Assembly election: Sagalee
Party	Candidate	Votes	%	±%
INC	Nabam Tuki	5,699	79.53%	▲16.80
AC	Nabam Nikia	1,467	20.47%	New
Margin of victory		4,232	59.06%	▲30.19
Turnout		7,166	79.31%	▼3.08
Registered electors		9,184		▲2.03
INC hold		Swing		

=== Assembly Election 1995 ===
1995 Arunachal Pradesh Legislative Assembly election: Sagalee
Party	Candidate	Votes	%	±%
INC	Nabam Tuki	4,579	62.73%	▲14.69
Independent	Taba Haniya	2,472	33.86%	New
Independent	Nabam Tana Hina	249	3.41%	New
Margin of victory		2,107	28.86%	▲24.93
Turnout		7,300	81.94%	▲1.11
Registered electors		9,001		▲16.56
INC gain from JD		Swing		

=== Assembly Election 1990 ===
1990 Arunachal Pradesh Legislative Assembly election: Sagalee
Party	Candidate	Votes	%	±%
JD	Taba Haniya	3,210	51.97%	New
INC	Nabam Tuki	2,967	48.03%	New
Margin of victory		243	3.93%	
Turnout		6,177	81.09%	
Registered electors		7,722		
JD win (new seat)				

== See also ==
- List of constituencies of the Arunachal Pradesh Legislative Assembly
- Papum Pare district
