= Dirang Assembly constituency =

Constituency of the Arunachal Pradesh legislative assembly in India

Coordinates: 27.35°N 92.25°E

Dirang
- Constituency No. 4 for the Arunachal Pradesh Legislative Assembly

Constituency details
- Country: India
- Region: Northeast India
- State: Arunachal Pradesh
- District: Tawang
- Lok Sabha constituency: Arunachal East
- Established: 1990
- Total electors: 15,262
- Reservation: ST

Member of Legislative Assembly
- 11th Arunachal Pradesh Legislative Assembly
- Incumbent Phurpa Tsering
- Party: Bharatiya Janata Party
- Elected year: 2024

Dirang is one of the 60 assembly constituencies of Arunachal Pradesh, a northeastern state of India. It is part of Arunachal East Lok Sabha constituency.

== Members of the Legislative Assembly ==
Election	Name	Party
1990	Lobsang Tsering	Independent
1995	Tsering Gyurme	Indian National Congress
1999	Tsering Gyurme	Indian National Congress
2004	Tsering Gyurme	Indian National Congress
2009	Phurpa Tsering	People's Party of Arunachal
2014	Phurpa Tsering	People's Party of Arunachal
2019	Phurpa Tsering	Bharatiya Janata Party
2024	Phurpa Tsering	Bharatiya Janata Party

== Election results ==
=== Assembly Election 2024 ===
2024 Arunachal Pradesh Legislative Assembly election : Dirang
Party	Candidate	Votes	%	±%
BJP	Phurpa Tsering	7,430	54.08%	New
NPP	Yeshi Tsewang	6,228	45.33%	New
NOTA	None of the Above	81	0.59%	New
Margin of victory		1,202	8.75%	
Turnout		13,739	90.02%	▲90.02
Registered electors		15,262		▲8.86
BJP hold		Swing		

=== Assembly Election 2019 ===
2019 Arunachal Pradesh Legislative Assembly election: Dirang
Party	Candidate	Votes	%	±%
BJP	Phurpa Tsering	Unopposed		
Registered electors		14,020		▲3.74
BJP gain from INC		Swing		

=== Assembly Election 2014 ===
2014 Arunachal Pradesh Legislative Assembly election : Dirang
Party	Candidate	Votes	%	±%
INC	Phurpa Tsering	Unopposed		
Registered electors		13,515		▼1.78
INC gain from PPA		Swing		

=== Assembly Election 2009 ===
2009 Arunachal Pradesh Legislative Assembly election : Dirang
Party	Candidate	Votes	%	±%
PPA	Phurpa Tsering	6,618	56.55%	New
INC	Tsering Gyurme	5,085	43.45%	New
Margin of victory		1,533	13.10%	
Turnout		11,703	85.05%	▲85.05
Registered electors		13,760		▲26.37
PPA gain from INC		Swing		

=== Assembly Election 2004 ===
2004 Arunachal Pradesh Legislative Assembly election : Dirang
Party	Candidate	Votes	%	±%
INC	Tsering Gyurme	Unopposed		
Registered electors		10,889		▲6.27
INC hold		Swing		

=== Assembly Election 1999 ===
1999 Arunachal Pradesh Legislative Assembly election : Dirang
Party	Candidate	Votes	%	±%
INC	Tsering Gyurme	4,472	58.00%	▲7.49
BJP	Tongchen Jomba Khrimey	2,949	38.25%	New
NCP	Sange Tsering	289	3.75%	New
Margin of victory		1,523	19.75%	▲4.02
Turnout		7,710	77.49%	▼7.82
Registered electors		10,247		▲6.04
INC hold		Swing		

=== Assembly Election 1995 ===
1995 Arunachal Pradesh Legislative Assembly election : Dirang
Party	Candidate	Votes	%	±%
INC	Tsering Gyurme	4,054	50.51%	▲17.97
Independent	Lobsang Tsering	2,791	34.77%	New
Independent	Sangja Gombu	1,181	14.71%	New
Margin of victory		1,263	15.74%	▲0.72
Turnout		8,026	84.59%	▲9.09
Registered electors		9,663		▲4.52
INC gain from Independent		Swing		

=== Assembly Election 1990 ===
1990 Arunachal Pradesh Legislative Assembly election : Dirang
Party	Candidate	Votes	%	±%
Independent	Lobsang Tsering	3,252	47.56%	New
INC	Tsering Gyurme	2,225	32.54%	New
JD	Namgyal Tsering	1,361	19.90%	New
Margin of victory		1,027	15.02%	
Turnout		6,838	75.54%	
Registered electors		9,245		
Independent win (new seat)				

== See also ==
- Dirang
- Tawang district
- List of constituencies of Arunachal Pradesh Legislative Assembly
