= Mariyang-Geku Assembly constituency =

Constituency of the Arunachal Pradesh legislative assembly in India

Coordinates: 28.49°N 95.22°E

Mariyang-Geku
- Constituency No. 40 for the Arunachal Pradesh Legislative Assembly

Constituency details
- Country: India
- Region: Northeast India
- State: Arunachal Pradesh
- District: Upper Siang
- Lok Sabha constituency: Arunachal West
- Established: 1990
- Total electors: 12,212
- Reservation: ST

Member of Legislative Assembly
- 11th Arunachal Pradesh Legislative Assembly
- Incumbent Oni Panyang
- Party: PPA
- Alliance: NDA
- Elected year: 2024

Mariyang-Geku is one of the 60 assembly constituencies of Arunachal Pradesh, a northeastern state of India. It is also a part of the Arunachal West Lok Sabha constituency.

== Members of the Legislative Assembly ==
Election	Name	Party
1990	Kabang Borang	Indian National Congress
1995	Kabang Borang	Indian National Congress
1999	Kabang Borang	Indian National Congress
2004	J. K. Panggeng	Arunachal Congress
2009	J. K. Panggeng	Indian National Congress
2014	Olom Panyang	Bharatiya Janata Party
2019	Kanggong Taku	Janata Dal
2024	Oni Panyang	National People's Party

== Election results ==
=== Assembly Election 2024 ===
2024 Arunachal Pradesh Legislative Assembly election : Mariyang-Geku
Party	Candidate	Votes	%	±%
NPP	Oni Panyang	6,115	52.78%	New
BJP	Olom Panyang	5,442	46.97%	▲6.37
NOTA	None of the Above	28	0.24%	▼0.73
Margin of victory		673	5.81%	▼6.65
Turnout		11,585	94.87%	▲0.61
Registered electors		12,212		▲13.84
NPP gain from JD(U)		Swing	▼0.29	

=== Assembly Election 2019 ===
2019 Arunachal Pradesh Legislative Assembly election : Mariyang-Geku
Party	Candidate	Votes	%	±%
JD(U)	Kanggong Taku	5,366	53.07%	New
BJP	Anong Perme	4,106	40.61%	▼5.39
INC	J. K. Panggeng	392	3.88%	▼42.02
PPA	Ani Moyong	149	1.47%	▼2.04
NOTA	None of the Above	98	0.97%	▲0.89
Margin of victory		1,260	12.46%	▲12.36
Turnout		10,111	94.26%	▲4.03
Registered electors		10,727		▲6.06
JD(U) gain from BJP		Swing	▲7.07	

=== Assembly Election 2014 ===
2014 Arunachal Pradesh Legislative Assembly election : Mariyang-Geku
Party	Candidate	Votes	%	±%
BJP	Olom Panyang	4,198	46.00%	▲43.95
INC	J. K. Panggeng	4,189	45.90%	▲1.86
PPA	Thomas Borang	321	3.52%	New
NCP	Ogenjamoh	231	2.53%	▼27.98
Independent	Toi Modi	180	1.97%	New
NOTA	None of the Above	7	0.08%	New
Margin of victory		9	0.10%	▼13.44
Turnout		9,126	90.23%	▲1.66
Registered electors		10,114		▼5.26
BJP gain from INC		Swing	▲1.95	

=== Assembly Election 2009 ===
2009 Arunachal Pradesh Legislative Assembly election : Mariyang-Geku
Party	Candidate	Votes	%	±%
INC	Panggeng	4,165	44.05%	▲15.08
NCP	Raising Perme	2,885	30.51%	New
AITC	Olom Panyang	2,212	23.39%	New
BJP	Dana Pertin	194	2.05%	▼8.17
Margin of victory		1,280	13.54%	▼8.38
Turnout		9,456	88.57%	▲9.18
Registered electors		10,676		▼1.46
INC gain from AC		Swing	▼6.83	

=== Assembly Election 2004 ===
2004 Arunachal Pradesh Legislative Assembly election : Mariyang-Geku
Party	Candidate	Votes	%	±%
AC	J. K. Panggeng	4,376	50.88%	▲12.69
INC	Kabang Borang	2,491	28.96%	▼14.18
BJP	Kangir Jamoh	879	10.22%	▼8.45
Independent	Dana Pertin	855	9.94%	New
Margin of victory		1,885	21.92%	▲16.96
Turnout		8,601	78.84%	▼1.34
Registered electors		10,834		▲18.74
AC gain from INC		Swing	▲7.73	

=== Assembly Election 1999 ===
1999 Arunachal Pradesh Legislative Assembly election : Mariyang-Geku
Party	Candidate	Votes	%	±%
INC	Kabang Borang	3,178	43.14%	▼6.29
AC	J. K. Panggeng	2,813	38.19%	New
BJP	Raising Perme	1,375	18.67%	▲12.92
Margin of victory		365	4.96%	▼10.92
Turnout		7,366	82.75%	▼4.14
Registered electors		9,124		▲3.92
INC hold		Swing		

=== Assembly Election 1995 ===
1995 Arunachal Pradesh Legislative Assembly election : Mariyang-Geku
Party	Candidate	Votes	%	±%
INC	Kabang Borang	3,684	49.44%	▼5.65
Independent	J. K. Panggeng	2,501	33.56%	New
Independent	Apel Perme	706	9.47%	New
BJP	Kangir Jamoh	428	5.74%	New
Independent	Dana Pertin	133	1.78%	New
Margin of victory		1,183	15.87%	▲5.70
Turnout		7,452	86.18%	▲0.69
Registered electors		8,780		▲8.96
INC hold		Swing	▼5.65	

=== Assembly Election 1990 ===
1990 Arunachal Pradesh Legislative Assembly election : Mariyang-Geku
Party	Candidate	Votes	%	±%
INC	Kabang Borang	3,737	55.09%	New
JD	Bakin Pertin	3,047	44.91%	New
Margin of victory		690	10.17%	
Turnout		6,784	85.58%	
Registered electors		8,058		
INC win (new seat)				

== See also ==
- Itanagar
- Upper Siang district
- List of constituencies of Arunachal Pradesh Legislative Assembly
