= Gabriel Denwang Wangsu =

Indian politician

Member of the Arunachal Pradesh Legislative Assembly
- Incumbent
- Assumed office 2014
- Constituency: Kanubari

Personal details
- Party: Bharatiya Janata Party

Gabriel Denwang Wangsu is an Indian politician and journalist.

Wangsu contested the Kanubari constituency in the 2009 Arunachal Pradesh Legislative Assembly election. He stood as a People's Party of Arunachal candidate, obtaining 4,189 votes (46.30%) and finishing in second place behind the Indian National Congress leader Newlai Tingkhatra.

He again contested the Kanubari seat in the 2014 Arunachal Pradesh Legislative Assembly election, standing as an independent. He was again defeated by Tingkhatra, finishing in third place with 2,756 votes. Tingkhatra died soon after the results were declared. Wangsu stood as the Indian National Congress candidate in the 15 October 2014 by-election to fill the vacant Kanubari seat. He was elected with 5,231 votes. He was successfully re-elected in the 2019 and 2024 Arunachal Pradesh Legislative Assembly elections.
