= Dumporijo Assembly constituency =

Legislative Assembly constituency in Arunachal Pradesh State, India

Coordinates: 27.98°N 94.22°E

Dumporijo
- Constituency No. 26 for the Arunachal Pradesh Legislative Assembly

Constituency details
- Country: India
- Region: Northeast India
- State: Arunachal Pradesh
- District: Upper Subansiri
- Lok Sabha constituency: Arunachal West
- Established: 2004
- Total electors: 12,912
- Reservation: ST

Member of Legislative Assembly
- 11th Arunachal Pradesh Legislative Assembly
- Incumbent Rode Bui
- Party: Bharatiya Janata Party

Dumporijo is one of the 60 Legislative Assembly constituencies of Arunachal Pradesh state in India.

It is part of Upper Subansiri district and is reserved for candidates belonging to the Scheduled Tribes.

== Members of the Legislative Assembly ==
Election	Name	Party
1990	Larbin Nasi	Independent politician
1995	Takar Doni	Indian National Congress
1999	Takar Marde	Indian National Congress
2004	Takar Marde	Indian National Congress
2009	Takar Marde	Indian National Congress
2014	Paknga Bage	Independent politician
2019	Rode Bui	Bharatiya Janata Party
2024	Rode Bui	Bharatiya Janata Party

== Election results ==
=== Assembly Election 2024 ===
2024 Arunachal Pradesh Legislative Assembly election : Dumporijo
Party	Candidate	Votes	%	±%
BJP	Rode Bui	6,400	57.01%	▲9.91
NPP	Tabe Doni	4,809	42.84%	▲5.67
NOTA	None of the Above	17	0.15%	▼0.24
Margin of victory		1,591	14.17%	▲4.23
Turnout		11,226	65.86%	▼18.17
Registered electors		17,044		▲45.56
BJP hold		Swing	▲9.91	

=== Assembly Election 2019 ===
2019 Arunachal Pradesh Legislative Assembly election : Dumporijo
Party	Candidate	Votes	%	±%
BJP	Rode Bui	4,635	47.10%	New
NPP	Paknga Bage	3,657	37.16%	New
JD(U)	Gumjum Haider	1,509	15.34%	New
NOTA	None of the Above	39	0.40%	▼0.30
Margin of victory		978	9.94%	▼4.03
Turnout		9,840	84.04%	▲0.45
Registered electors		11,709		▲0.78
BJP gain from Independent		Swing	▼9.53	

=== Assembly Election 2014 ===
2014 Arunachal Pradesh Legislative Assembly election : Dumporijo
Party	Candidate	Votes	%	±%
Independent	Paknga Bage	5,500	56.64%	New
INC	Takar Marde	4,143	42.66%	▼38.54
NOTA	None of the Above	68	0.70%	New
Margin of victory		1,357	13.97%	▼48.42
Turnout		9,711	83.59%	▲6.93
Registered electors		11,618		▼3.50
Independent gain from INC		Swing		

=== Assembly Election 2009 ===
2009 Arunachal Pradesh Legislative Assembly election : Dumporijo
Party	Candidate	Votes	%	±%
INC	Takar Marde	7,493	81.20%	▲41.83
BJP	Lompak Paksok	1,735	18.80%	▲8.58
Margin of victory		5,758	62.40%	▲60.59
Turnout		9,228	76.65%	▲4.22
Registered electors		12,039		▲1.59
INC hold		Swing		

=== Assembly Election 2004 ===
2004 Arunachal Pradesh Legislative Assembly election : Dumporijo
Party	Candidate	Votes	%	±%
INC	Takar Marde	3,379	39.37%	▼22.28
Independent	Takar Doni	3,224	37.56%	New
AC	Yabik Gongo	1,103	12.85%	▼25.50
BJP	Rode Bui	877	10.22%	New
Margin of victory		155	1.81%	▼21.49
Turnout		8,583	69.27%	▼9.27
Registered electors		11,850		▲19.23
INC hold		Swing	▼22.28	

=== Assembly Election 1999 ===
1999 Arunachal Pradesh Legislative Assembly election : Dumporijo
Party	Candidate	Votes	%	±%
INC	Takar Marde	5,006	61.65%	▲5.34
AC	Takar Doni	3,114	38.35%	New
Margin of victory		1,892	23.30%	▲10.68
Turnout		8,120	83.07%	▼6.14
Registered electors		9,939		▲44.38
INC hold		Swing		

=== Assembly Election 1995 ===
1995 Arunachal Pradesh Legislative Assembly election : Dumporijo
Party	Candidate	Votes	%	±%
INC	Takar Doni	3,405	56.31%	▲32.68
JD	Tadam Lida	2,642	43.69%	▲13.56
Margin of victory		763	12.62%	▼3.49
Turnout		6,047	89.13%	▲8.71
Registered electors		6,884		▼22.43
INC gain from Independent		Swing		

=== Assembly Election 1990 ===
1990 Arunachal Pradesh Legislative Assembly election : Dumporijo
Party	Candidate	Votes	%	±%
Independent	Larbin Nasi	3,247	46.24%	New
JD	Tomo Riba	2,116	30.13%	New
INC	Tapu Rilo	1,659	23.63%	New
Margin of victory		1,131	16.11%	
Turnout		7,022	79.96%	
Registered electors		8,874		
Independent win (new seat)				

== See also ==
- List of constituencies of the Arunachal Pradesh Legislative Assembly
- Upper Subansiri district
