= Paknga Bage =

Indian politician

Paknga Bage is an Indian politician from the state of Arunachal Pradesh.

Bage was elected from the Dumporijo constituency in the 2014 Arunachal Pradesh Legislative Assembly election, standing as an Independent candidate.

== See also ==
Arunachal Pradesh Legislative Assembly
