= Wanglin Lowangdong =

MLA of Borduria- Bogapani Constituency of Arunachal Pradesh

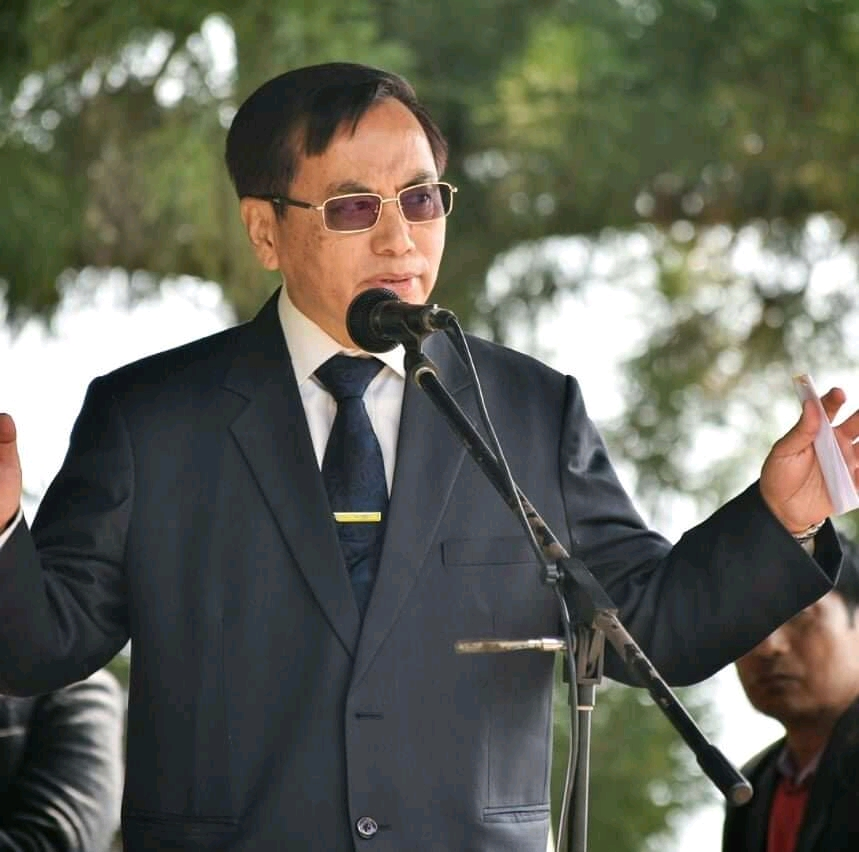
- Wanglin Lowangdong addressing the denizens of Tirap
- Born: Borduria
- Education: St. Stephens's College, Delhi
- Occupation: Politician
- Father: Lt. Towang Lowangdong

Wanglin Lowangdong is an Indian politician from the state of Arunachal Pradesh. He joined the Bharatiya Janata Party in the presence of Chief Minister Pema Khandu in Itanagar on 25 February 2024.

Lowangdong was elected from Borduria-Bogapani seat in the 2019 Arunachal Pradesh Legislative Assembly election, standing as an Indian National Congress candidate. In terms of educational qualification, he is a graduate (B.A.).

He was born into the Nocte Tribe of Borduria, Arunachal Pradesh and at present he is also the Paramount Chief of the Nocte Tribe.

He was re-elected in 2024 as a BJP candidate.

== Electoral performance ==
Election	Constituency	Party	Result	Votes %	Opposition Candidate	Opposition Party	Opposition vote %	Ref
2024	Borduria–Bagapani	BJP	Won	57.19%	Jowang Hosai	NCP	39.63%	
2019	Borduria–Bagapani	INC	Won	33.20%	Jowang Hosai	BJP	31.92%	
2014	Borduria–Bagapani	INC	Won	35.56%	Lowangcha Wanglat	BJP	30.60%	
2009	Borduria–Bagapani	INC	Won	67.89%	Tonhang Tongluk	NCP	32.11%	
2004	Borduria–Bagapani	Independent	Won	59.51%	Lowangcha Wanglat	INC	40.49%	
1999	Borduria–Bagapani	Independent	Lost	49.86%	Lowangcha Wanglat	INC	50.14%	
