= Wangki Lowang =

Indian politician

Member of the Arunachal Pradesh Legislative Assembly

Wangki Lowang a politician from Bharatiya Janata Party is a Member of Legislative Assembly representing Namsang in the Arunachal Pradesh Legislative Assembly since 1999. He was a member of the Indian National Congress until December 2015. He was one of 21 MLAs who broke from the Indian National Congress to join the People's Party of Arunachal. He became Speaker of the Arunachal Pradesh Legislative Assembly in February 2016. Alo Libang is his deputy.

In July 2016, he was one of the 30 MLAs of People's Party of Arunachal to defect back to the Indian National Congress, before joining the Bharatiya Janata Party along with thirty two MLAs in December 2016.

== Electoral performance ==
Election	Constituency	Party	Result	Votes %	Opposition Candidate	Opposition Party	Opposition vote %	Ref
2024	Namsang	BJP	Won	49.65%	Ngonglin Boi	NCP	48.92%	
2019	Namsang	BJP	Won	45.09%	Ngonglin Boi	JD(U)	21.40%	
2014	Namsang	INC	Won	42.95%	Wanglong Rajkumar	BJP	29.64%	
2009	Namsang	INC	Won	68.59%	Wanglong Rajkumar	NCP	31.41%	
2004	Namsang	INC	Won	62.13%	Wangpha Lowang	Independent	23.13%	
1999	Namsang	NCP	Won	52.20%	Changkom Hondik	INC	47.80%	
