= Kanubari Assembly constituency =

Legislative Assembly constituency in Arunachal Pradesh State, India

Coordinates: 27.03°N 95.2°E

Kanubari
- Constituency No. 58 for the Arunachal Pradesh Legislative Assembly

Constituency details
- Country: India
- Region: Northeast India
- State: Arunachal Pradesh
- District: Longding
- Lok Sabha constituency: Arunachal East
- Established: 1990
- Total electors: 12,480
- Reservation: ST

Member of Legislative Assembly
- 11th Arunachal Pradesh Legislative Assembly
- Incumbent Gabriel Denwang Wangsu
- Party: Bharatiya Janata Party

Kanubari is one of the 60 Legislative Assembly constituencies of Arunachal Pradesh state in India. It is part of Longding district and is reserved for candidates belonging to the Scheduled Tribes.

== Members of the Legislative Assembly ==
Election	Member	Party
1990	Noksong Boham	Indian National Congress
1995	Noksong Boham	Indian National Congress
1999	Newlai Tingkhatra	Indian National Congress
2004	Newlai Tingkhatra	Indian National Congress
2009	Newlai Tingkhatra	Indian National Congress
2014	Newlai Tingkhatra	Indian National Congress
2019	Gabriel Denwang Wangsu	Bharatiya Janata Party
2024	Gabriel Denwang Wangsu	Bharatiya Janata Party

== Election results ==
=== Assembly Election 2024 ===
2024 Arunachal Pradesh Legislative Assembly election : Kanubari
Party	Candidate	Votes	%	±%
BJP	Gabriel Denwang Wangsu	5,584	47.10	▼18.82
NPP	Panjam Wangsa	3,525	29.73	New
PPA	Nokchai Boham	2,508	21.16	New
INC	Sompha Wangsa	201	1.70	▼22.59
NOTA	None of the Above	37	0.31	▼0.22
Margin of victory		2,059	17.37	▼24.27
Turnout		11,855	94.99	▲3.79
Registered electors		12,480		▲11.88
BJP hold		Swing	▼18.82	

=== Assembly Election 2019 ===
2019 Arunachal Pradesh Legislative Assembly election : Kanubari
Party	Candidate	Votes	%	±%
BJP	Gabriel Denwang Wangsu	6,707	65.92	▲31.13
INC	Nokchai Boham	2,471	24.29	▼11.02
Independent	Manhang Loham	942	9.26	New
NOTA	None of the Above	54	0.53	▼0.61
Margin of victory		4,236	41.64	▲41.12
Turnout		10,174	91.21	▼0.82
Registered electors		11,155		▲7.14
BJP gain from INC		Swing	▲30.62	

=== Assembly Election 2014 ===
2014 Arunachal Pradesh Legislative Assembly election : Kanubari
Party	Candidate	Votes	%	±%
INC	Newlai Tingkhatra	3,383	35.31	▼18.40
BJP	Rongnaimaham	3,334	34.79	New
Independent	Gabriel Denwang Wangsu	2,756	28.76	New
NOTA	None of the Above	109	1.14	New
Margin of victory		49	0.51	▼6.89
Turnout		9,582	92.03	▲0.87
Registered electors		10,412		▲4.90
INC hold		Swing	▼18.40	

=== Assembly Election 2009 ===
2009 Arunachal Pradesh Legislative Assembly election : Kanubari
Party	Candidate	Votes	%	±%
INC	Newlai Tingkhatra	4,859	53.70	▲22.36
PPA	Gabriel Denwang Wangsu	4,189	46.30	New
Margin of victory		670	7.40	▲5.42
Turnout		9,048	91.15	▲9.87
Registered electors		9,926		▲15.24
INC hold		Swing		

=== Assembly Election 2004 ===
2004 Arunachal Pradesh Legislative Assembly election : Kanubari
Party	Candidate	Votes	%	±%
INC	Newlai Tingkhatra	2,194	31.34	▼8.17
NCP	Laichoi Wangpan	2,055	29.35	▲14.76
Independent	Hejam Ponglaham	1,134	16.20	New
BJP	Noksong Boham	1,015	14.50	New
Independent	Alini Wangcha (Rajkumari)	603	8.61	New
Margin of victory		139	1.99	▼18.93
Turnout		7,001	80.49	▼1.71
Registered electors		8,613		▲18.38
INC hold		Swing	▼8.17	

=== Assembly Election 1999 ===
1999 Arunachal Pradesh Legislative Assembly election : Kanubari
Party	Candidate	Votes	%	±%
INC	Newlai Tingkhatra	2,386	39.51	▼1.13
Independent	Laichoi Wangpan	1,123	18.60	New
Independent	Hejam Ponglaham	930	15.40	New
NCP	Jamaw Arangham	881	14.59	New
Independent	Sompha Wangsa	719	11.91	New
Margin of victory		1,263	20.91	▲12.39
Turnout		6,039	85.62	▼7.26
Registered electors		7,276		▲13.53
INC hold		Swing	▼1.13	

=== Assembly Election 1995 ===
1995 Arunachal Pradesh Legislative Assembly election : Kanubari
Party	Candidate	Votes	%	±%
INC	Noksong Boham	2,351	40.64	▲10.43
Independent	Hejam Ponglaham	1,858	32.12	New
Independent	Tony Rajkumar	1,576	27.24	New
Margin of victory		493	8.52	▲6.29
Turnout		5,785	91.65	▲6.90
Registered electors		6,409		▲17.96
INC hold		Swing		

=== Assembly Election 1990 ===
1990 Arunachal Pradesh Legislative Assembly election : Kanubari
Party	Candidate	Votes	%	±%
INC	Noksong Boham	1,368	30.21	New
JD	Nokram Wangham	1,267	27.98	New
Independent	Newlai Tingkhatra	1,004	22.17	New
Independent	Rawang Wangham	582	12.85	New
Independent	Tony Raj Kumar	220	4.86	New
Independent	Laichat Arangham	66	1.46	New
Margin of victory		101	2.23	
Turnout		4,529	85.42	
Registered electors		5,433		
INC win (new seat)				

== See also ==
- List of constituencies of the Arunachal Pradesh Legislative Assembly
- Longding district
