= Borduria–Bagapani Assembly constituency =

Legislative Assembly constituency in Arunachal Pradesh State, India

Coordinates: 27.03°N 95.47°E

Borduria-Bagapani
- Constituency No. 57 for the Arunachal Pradesh Legislative Assembly

Constituency details
- Country: India
- Region: Northeast India
- State: Arunachal Pradesh
- District: Tirap
- Lok Sabha constituency: Arunachal East
- Established: 1990
- Total electors: 9,101
- Reservation: ST

Member of Legislative Assembly
- 11th Arunachal Pradesh Legislative Assembly
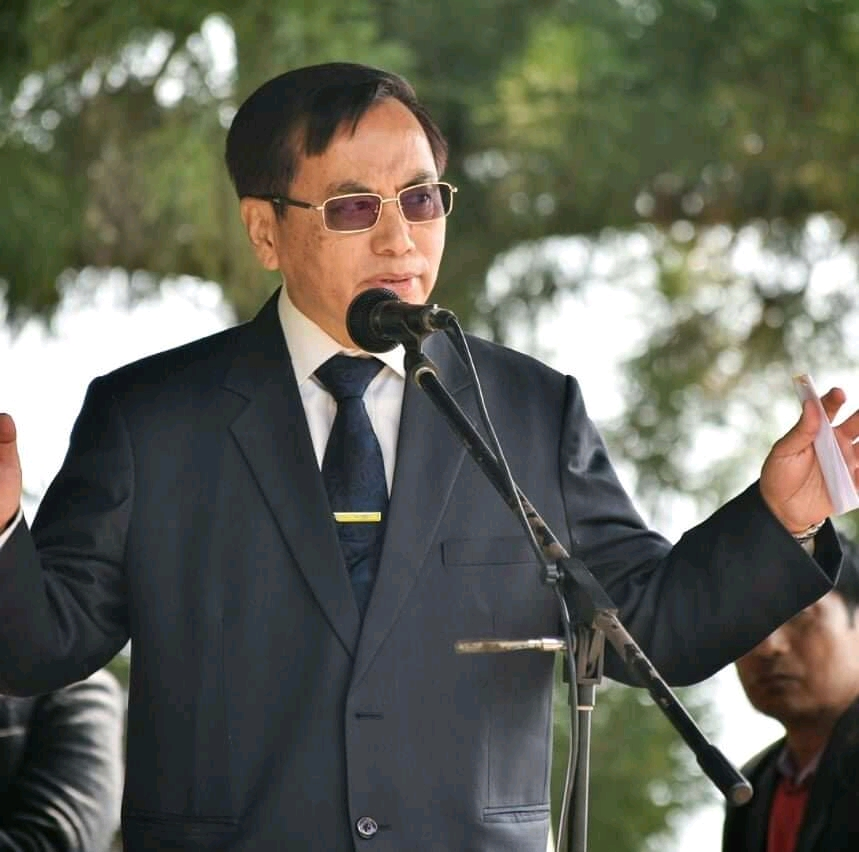
- Incumbent Wanglin Lowangdong
- Party: Bharatiya Janata Party

Borduria-Bagapani is one of the 60 Legislative Assembly constituencies of Arunachal Pradesh state in India.

It is part of Tirap district and is reserved for candidates belonging to the Scheduled Tribes.

== Members of the Legislative Assembly ==
Year	Name	Party
1990	James Lowangcha Wanglat	Janata Dal
1995	James Lowangcha Wanglat	Indian National Congress
1999	James Lowangcha Wanglat	Indian National Congress
2004	Wanglin Lowangdong	Independent politician
2009	Wanglin Lowangdong	Indian National Congress
2014	Wanglin Lowangdong	Indian National Congress
2019	Wanglin Lowangdong	Indian National Congress
2024	Wanglin Lowangdong	Bharatiya Janata Party

== Election results ==
=== Assembly Election 2024 ===
2024 Arunachal Pradesh Legislative Assembly election: Borduria–Bagapani
Party	Candidate	Votes	%	±%
BJP	Wanglin Lowangdong	4,731	57.19%	▲25.27
NCP	Jowang Hosai	3,279	39.63%	New
PPA	Honting Wangpan	195	2.36%	New
NOTA	None of the Above	68	0.82%	▲0.40
Margin of victory		1,452	17.55%	▲16.26
Turnout		8,273	90.90%	▼0.68
Registered electors		9,101		▲10.74
BJP gain from INC		Swing	▲23.98	

=== Assembly Election 2019 ===
2019 Arunachal Pradesh Legislative Assembly election: Borduria–Bagapani
Party	Candidate	Votes	%	±%
INC	Wanglin Lowangdong	2,499	33.20%	▼2.35
BJP	Jowang Hosai	2,402	31.92%	▲1.31
Independent	Sephua Wangsu	1,551	20.61%	New
NPP	Khawang Rangsu	484	6.43%	New
Independent	Ngasah Tangjang	338	4.49%	New
JD(S)	Chaphung Wangsu	220	2.92%	New
NOTA	None of the Above	32	0.43%	New
Margin of victory		97	1.29%	▼3.67
Turnout		7,526	91.58%	▲2.38
Registered electors		8,218		▲15.70
INC hold		Swing	▼2.35	

=== Assembly Election 2014 ===
2014 Arunachal Pradesh Legislative Assembly election: Borduria–Bagapani
Party	Candidate	Votes	%	±%
INC	Wanglin Lowangdong	2,253	35.56%	▼32.33
BJP	Lowangcha Wanglat	1,939	30.60%	New
Independent	Jowang Hosai	1,102	17.39%	New
Independent	Chaphung Wangsu	875	13.81%	New
Independent	Hangchatonrang	105	1.66%	New
NOTA	None of the Above	62	0.98%	New
Margin of victory		314	4.96%	▼30.82
Turnout		6,336	89.20%	▲2.63
Registered electors		7,103		▲3.48
INC hold		Swing	▼32.33	

=== Assembly Election 2009 ===
2009 Arunachal Pradesh Legislative Assembly election: Borduria–Bagapani
Party	Candidate	Votes	%	±%
INC	Wanglin Lowangdong	4,034	67.89%	▲27.40
NCP	Tonhang Tongluk	1,908	32.11%	New
Margin of victory		2,126	35.78%	▲16.75
Turnout		5,942	86.57%	▲6.20
Registered electors		6,864		▲12.86
INC gain from Independent		Swing		

=== Assembly Election 2004 ===
2004 Arunachal Pradesh Legislative Assembly election: Borduria–Bagapani
Party	Candidate	Votes	%	±%
Independent	Wanglin Lowangdong	2,909	59.51%	New
INC	Lowangcha Wanglat	1,979	40.49%	▼9.66
Margin of victory		930	19.03%	▲18.74
Turnout		4,888	78.84%	▲10.90
Registered electors		6,082		▼7.44
Independent gain from INC		Swing		

=== Assembly Election 1999 ===
1999 Arunachal Pradesh Legislative Assembly election: Borduria–Bagapani
Party	Candidate	Votes	%	±%
INC	Lowangcha Wanglat	2,289	50.14%	▼21.39
Independent	Wanglin Lowangdong	2,276	49.86%	New
Margin of victory		13	0.28%	▼42.77
Turnout		4,565	71.42%	▼16.42
Registered electors		6,571		▲10.51
INC hold		Swing		

=== Assembly Election 1995 ===
1995 Arunachal Pradesh Legislative Assembly election: Borduria–Bagapani
Party	Candidate	Votes	%	±%
INC	Lowangcha Wanglat	3,653	71.53%	▲33.93
Independent	Dinwang Lowang	1,454	28.47%	New
Margin of victory		2,199	43.06%	▲18.27
Turnout		5,107	87.37%	▲8.93
Registered electors		5,946		▼2.62
INC gain from JD		Swing		

=== Assembly Election 1990 ===
1990 Arunachal Pradesh Legislative Assembly election: Borduria–Bagapani
Party	Candidate	Votes	%	±%
JD	Lowangcha Wanglat	2,932	62.40%	New
INC	W.Ajay Rajkumar	1,767	37.60%	New
Margin of victory		1,165	24.79%	
Turnout		4,699	78.17%	
Registered electors		6,106		
JD win (new seat)				

== See also ==
- List of constituencies of the Arunachal Pradesh Legislative Assembly
- Tirap district
