= Miao Assembly constituency =

Legislative Assembly constituency in Arunachal Pradesh State, India

Coordinates: 27.49°N 96.21°E

Miao
- Constituency No. 50 for the Arunachal Pradesh Legislative Assembly

Constituency details
- Country: India
- Region: Northeast India
- State: Arunachal Pradesh
- District: Changlang
- Lok Sabha constituency: Arunachal East
- Established: 1990
- Total electors: 22,296
- Reservation: ST

Member of Legislative Assembly
- 11th Arunachal Pradesh Legislative Assembly
- Incumbent Kamlung Mossang
- Party: Bharatiya Janata Party

Miao is one of the 60 Legislative Assembly constituencies of Arunachal Pradesh state in India.

It is part of Changlang district, and is reserved for candidates belonging to the Scheduled Tribes. As of 2019, its representative is Kamlung Mossang of the Bharatiya Janata Party.

== Members of the Legislative Assembly ==
Election	Name	Party
1990	Samchom Ngemu	Indian National Congress
1995	Samchom Ngemu	Indian National Congress
1999	Samchom Ngemu	Indian National Congress
2004	Kamlung Mossang	Indian National Congress
2009	Kamlung Mossang	Indian National Congress
2014	Kamlung Mossang	Indian National Congress
2019	Kamlung Mossang	Bharatiya Janata Party
2024	Kamlung Mossang	Bharatiya Janata Party

== Election results ==
=== Assembly Election 2024 ===
2024 Arunachal Pradesh Legislative Assembly election : Miao
Party	Candidate	Votes	%	±%
BJP	Kamlung Mossang	11,021	57.62%	▼3.76
INC	Chatu Longri	7,894	41.27%	▲4.14
NOTA	None of the Above	211	1.10%	▼0.39
Margin of victory		3,127	16.35%	▼7.90
Turnout		19,126	85.78%	▲6.17
Registered electors		22,296		▲11.63
BJP hold		Swing	▼3.76	

=== Assembly Election 2019 ===
2019 Arunachal Pradesh Legislative Assembly election : Miao
Party	Candidate	Votes	%	±%
BJP	Kamlung Mossang	9,760	61.38%	▲25.80
INC	Chatu Longri	5,904	37.13%	▼25.75
NOTA	None of the Above	237	1.49%	▼0.05
Margin of victory		3,856	24.25%	▼3.06
Turnout		15,901	79.61%	▲1.33
Registered electors		19,974		▲11.65
BJP gain from INC		Swing	▼1.50	

=== Assembly Election 2014 ===
2014 Arunachal Pradesh Legislative Assembly election : Miao
Party	Candidate	Votes	%	±%
INC	Kamlung Mossang	8,806	62.88%	▲3.19
BJP	Chomjong Haidley	4,982	35.58%	New
NOTA	None of the Above	216	1.54%	New
Margin of victory		3,824	27.31%	▲7.93
Turnout		14,004	78.28%	▼3.58
Registered electors		17,890		▼4.47
INC hold		Swing		

=== Assembly Election 2009 ===
2009 Arunachal Pradesh Legislative Assembly election : Miao
Party	Candidate	Votes	%	±%
INC	Kamlung Mossang	9,151	59.69%	▲6.60
NCP	Samchom Ngemu	6,180	40.31%	New
Margin of victory		2,971	19.38%	▲13.19
Turnout		15,331	81.86%	▲16.17
Registered electors		18,728		▲16.92
INC hold		Swing		

=== Assembly Election 2004 ===
2004 Arunachal Pradesh Legislative Assembly election : Miao
Party	Candidate	Votes	%	±%
INC	Kamlung Mossang	5,587	53.09%	▲1.34
Independent	Kittang Kitnal Muklom	4,936	46.91%	New
Margin of victory		651	6.19%	▲2.68
Turnout		10,523	64.55%	▼4.72
Registered electors		16,018		▲9.43
INC hold		Swing		

=== Assembly Election 1999 ===
1999 Arunachal Pradesh Legislative Assembly election : Miao
Party	Candidate	Votes	%	±%
INC	Samchom Ngemu	5,334	51.75%	▼7.57
Independent	Kamlung Mossang	4,973	48.25%	New
Margin of victory		361	3.50%	▼15.14
Turnout		10,307	71.96%	▼15.95
Registered electors		14,637		▲22.15
INC hold		Swing		

=== Assembly Election 1995 ===
1995 Arunachal Pradesh Legislative Assembly election : Miao
Party	Candidate	Votes	%	±%
INC	Samchom Ngemu	6,140	59.32%	▲3.01
Independent	Kamlung Mossang	4,210	40.68%	New
Margin of victory		1,930	18.65%	▲6.02
Turnout		10,350	87.72%	▲16.75
Registered electors		11,983		▲31.15
INC hold		Swing		

=== Assembly Election 1990 ===
1990 Arunachal Pradesh Legislative Assembly election : Miao
Party	Candidate	Votes	%	±%
INC	Samchom Ngemu	3,582	56.31%	New
JD	Kittang Kitnal Muklom	2,779	43.69%	New
Margin of victory		803	12.62%	
Turnout		6,361	71.06%	
Registered electors		9,137		
INC win (new seat)				

== See also ==
- List of constituencies of the Arunachal Pradesh Legislative Assembly
- Changlang district
