= Mebo Assembly constituency =

Legislative Assembly constituency in Arunachal Pradesh State, India

Coordinates: 28.17°N 95.43°E

Mebo
- Constituency No. 39 for the Arunachal Pradesh Legislative Assembly

Constituency details
- Country: India
- Region: Northeast India
- State: Arunachal Pradesh
- District: East Siang
- Lok Sabha constituency: Arunachal East
- Established: 1990
- Total electors: 12,410
- Reservation: ST

Member of Legislative Assembly
- 11th Arunachal Pradesh Legislative Assembly
- Incumbent Oken Tayeng
- Party: PPA
- Alliance: NDA
- Elected year: 2024

Mebo is one of the 60 Legislative Assembly constituencies of Arunachal Pradesh state in India.

It is part of East Siang district and is reserved for candidates belonging to the Scheduled Tribes.

== Members of the Legislative Assembly ==
Year	Name	Party
1990	Lombo Tayeng	Indian National Congress
1995	Lombo Tayeng	Indian National Congress
1999	Lombo Tayeng	Indian National Congress
2004	Lombo Tayeng	Indian National Congress
2009	Ralom Borang	Nationalist Congress Party
2014	Lombo Tayeng	Indian National Congress
2019	Lombo Tayeng	Indian National Congress
2024	Oken Tayeng	People's Party of Arunachal

== Election results ==
=== Assembly Election 2024 ===
2024 Arunachal Pradesh Legislative Assembly election : Mebo
Party	Candidate	Votes	%	±%
PPA	Oken Tayeng	6,287	53.77%	New
BJP	Lombo Tayeng	5,270	45.07%	▼2.53
Independent	Shoney Pertin	105	0.90%	New
NOTA	None of the Above	31	0.27%	▼0.11
Margin of victory		1,017	8.70%	▲5.06
Turnout		11,693	94.22%	▲0.19
Registered electors		12,410		▲14.15
PPA gain from INC		Swing	▲2.53	

=== Assembly Election 2019 ===
2019 Arunachal Pradesh Legislative Assembly election : Mebo
Party	Candidate	Votes	%	±%
INC	Lombo Tayeng	5,238	51.24%	New
BJP	Dr. Dangi Perme	4,866	47.60%	New
NPP	Shoney Pertin	81	0.79%	New
NOTA	None of the Above	38	0.37%	New
Margin of victory		372	3.64%	
Turnout		10,223	94.03%	▲94.03
Registered electors		10,872		▲5.91
INC hold		Swing		

=== Assembly Election 2014 ===
2014 Arunachal Pradesh Legislative Assembly election : Mebo
Party	Candidate	Votes	%	±%
INC	Lombo Tayeng	Unopposed		
Registered electors		10,265		▼4.35
INC gain from NCP		Swing		

=== Assembly Election 2009 ===
2009 Arunachal Pradesh Legislative Assembly election : Mebo
Party	Candidate	Votes	%	±%
NCP	Ralom Borang	5,142	53.03%	New
INC	Lombo Tayeng	4,555	46.97%	▼3.85
Margin of victory		587	6.05%	▲4.40
Turnout		9,697	90.36%	▲3.73
Registered electors		10,732		▲30.99
NCP gain from INC		Swing		

=== Assembly Election 2004 ===
2004 Arunachal Pradesh Legislative Assembly election : Mebo
Party	Candidate	Votes	%	±%
INC	Lombo Tayeng	3,607	50.82%	▼5.50
Independent	Ralom Borang	3,490	49.18%	New
Margin of victory		117	1.65%	▼17.38
Turnout		7,097	85.17%	▲12.23
Registered electors		8,193		▼4.96
INC hold		Swing		

=== Assembly Election 1999 ===
1999 Arunachal Pradesh Legislative Assembly election : Mebo
Party	Candidate	Votes	%	±%
INC	Lombo Tayeng	3,612	56.32%	▲8.24
AC	Katon Borang	2,392	37.30%	New
NCP	Tomkin Borang	409	6.38%	New
Margin of victory		1,220	19.02%	▲3.41
Turnout		6,413	75.64%	▼9.91
Registered electors		8,621		▲26.06
INC hold		Swing		

=== Assembly Election 1995 ===
1995 Arunachal Pradesh Legislative Assembly election : Mebo
Party	Candidate	Votes	%	±%
INC	Lombo Tayeng	2,772	48.08%	▲1.60
JD	Bakin Pertin	1,872	32.47%	▼5.35
Independent	Naklom Modi	1,121	19.44%	New
Margin of victory		900	15.61%	▲6.95
Turnout		5,765	85.54%	▲7.59
Registered electors		6,839		▲9.25
INC hold		Swing		

=== Assembly Election 1990 ===
1990 Arunachal Pradesh Legislative Assembly election : Mebo
Party	Candidate	Votes	%	±%
INC	Lombo Tayeng	2,232	46.48%	New
JD	Maliyang Perme	1,816	37.82%	New
Independent	Onyok Rome	754	15.70%	New
Margin of victory		416	8.66%	
Turnout		4,802	77.68%	
Registered electors		6,260		
INC win (new seat)				

== See also ==
- List of constituencies of the Arunachal Pradesh Legislative Assembly
- East Siang district
