= Namsai Assembly constituency =

Legislative Assembly constituency in Arunachal Pradesh State, India

Coordinates: 27.67°N 95.86°E

Namsai
- Constituency No. 47 for the Arunachal Pradesh Legislative Assembly

Constituency details
- Country: India
- Region: Northeast India
- State: Arunachal Pradesh
- District: Namsai
- Lok Sabha constituency: Arunachal East
- Established: 1990
- Total electors: 24,554
- Reservation: ST

Member of Legislative Assembly
- 11th Arunachal Pradesh Legislative Assembly
- Incumbent Zingnu Namchoom
- Party: Bharatiya Janata Party

Namsai is one of the 60 Legislative Assembly constituencies of Arunachal Pradesh state in India.

It is part of Namsai district and is reserved for candidates belonging to the Scheduled Tribes. As of 2019, its representative is Zingnu Namchoom of the Bharatiya Janata Party.

== Members of the Legislative Assembly ==
Year	Member	Party
1990	Chow Pingthika Namchoom	Indian National Congress
1995	Chow Rajingda Namshum	Indian National Congress
1999	Chow Pingthika Namchoom	Indian National Congress
2004	Chow Pingthika Namchoom	Independent politician
2009	Nang Sati Mein	Independent politician
2014	Chau Zingnu Namchoom	Indian National Congress
2019	Chau Zingnu Namchoom	Bharatiya Janata Party
2024	Chau Zingnu Namchoom	Bharatiya Janata Party

== Election results ==
=== Assembly Election 2024 ===
2024 Arunachal Pradesh Legislative Assembly election : Namsai
Party	Candidate	Votes	%	±%
BJP	Chau Zingnu Namchoom	14,540	68.88%	▼0.91
NCP	Likha Saaya	5,984	28.35%	New
NOTA	None of the Above	584	2.77%	▼0.26
Margin of victory		8,556	40.53%	▼15.51
Turnout		21,108	85.97%	▲2.02
Registered electors		24,554		▲7.42
BJP hold		Swing	▼0.91	

=== Assembly Election 2019 ===
2019 Arunachal Pradesh Legislative Assembly election : Namsai
Party	Candidate	Votes	%	±%
BJP	Chau Zingnu Namchoom	13,392	69.79%	▲33.75
NPP	Mualin Agan	2,637	13.74%	New
INC	Dr. Chow Kedar Gohain	1,901	9.91%	▼51.65
JD(S)	Shotike Hopak	678	3.53%	New
NOTA	None of the Above	581	3.03%	▲0.63
Margin of victory		10,755	56.05%	▲30.54
Turnout		19,189	83.95%	▲1.72
Registered electors		22,858		▲11.22
BJP gain from INC		Swing	▲8.24	

=== Assembly Election 2014 ===
2014 Arunachal Pradesh Legislative Assembly election : Namsai
Party	Candidate	Votes	%	±%
INC	Chau Zingnu Namchoom	10,402	61.55%	▲59.91
BJP	Chow Pingthika Namchoom	6,091	36.04%	▲32.31
NOTA	None of the Above	406	2.40%	New
Margin of victory		4,311	25.51%	▼9.79
Turnout		16,899	82.23%	▼2.05
Registered electors		20,552		▲7.27
INC gain from Independent		Swing		

=== Assembly Election 2009 ===
2009 Arunachal Pradesh Legislative Assembly election : Namsai
Party	Candidate	Votes	%	±%
Independent	Nang Sati Mein	10,477	64.89%	New
AITC	Chow Pingthika Namchoom	4,778	29.59%	New
BJP	Chau Ambika Enling	603	3.73%	▼7.21
INC	Chow Chandra Mansai	266	1.65%	▼40.93
Margin of victory		5,699	35.30%	▲31.39
Turnout		16,146	84.27%	▲16.14
Registered electors		19,159		▼0.02
Independent hold		Swing	▲18.41	

=== Assembly Election 2004 ===
2004 Arunachal Pradesh Legislative Assembly election : Namsai
Party	Candidate	Votes	%	±%
Independent	Chow Pingthika Namchoom	6,069	46.48%	New
INC	Chow Pingthika Namchoom	5,559	42.57%	▼15.91
BJP	Chowlik Manpoong	1,429	10.94%	▼8.69
Margin of victory		510	3.91%	▼34.94
Turnout		13,057	68.00%	▼2.15
Registered electors		19,163		▲19.20
Independent gain from INC		Swing		

=== Assembly Election 1999 ===
1999 Arunachal Pradesh Legislative Assembly election : Namsai
Party	Candidate	Votes	%	±%
INC	Chow Pingthika Namchoom	6,609	58.49%	▲5.65
BJP	Chow Empu Chowpoo	2,219	19.64%	New
NCP	Chowlik Manpoong	2,195	19.42%	New
AC	Chau Tan Manpoong	277	2.45%	New
Margin of victory		4,390	38.85%	▲33.17
Turnout		11,300	73.42%	▼14.00
Registered electors		16,076		▲5.44
INC hold		Swing	▲5.65	

=== Assembly Election 1995 ===
1995 Arunachal Pradesh Legislative Assembly election : Namsai
Party	Candidate	Votes	%	±%
INC	Chow Rajingda Namshum	6,791	52.84%	▼7.02
JD	Chow Pingthika Namchoom	6,061	47.16%	▲11.61
Margin of victory		730	5.68%	▼18.63
Turnout		12,852	86.61%	▲11.51
Registered electors		15,247		▲21.24
INC hold		Swing		

=== Assembly Election 1990 ===
1990 Arunachal Pradesh Legislative Assembly election : Namsai
Party	Candidate	Votes	%	±%
INC	Chow Pingthika Namchoom	5,479	59.86%	New
JD	Chau Khouk Manpoong	3,254	35.55%	New
Independent	Upa Mansai	420	4.59%	New
Margin of victory		2,225	24.31%	
Turnout		9,153	74.41%	
Registered electors		12,576		
INC win (new seat)				

== See also ==
- List of constituencies of the Arunachal Pradesh Legislative Assembly
- Namsai district
