= Chowkham Assembly constituency =

Legislative Assembly constituency in Arunachal Pradesh State, India

Coordinates: 27.81°N 96.09°E

Chowkham
- Constituency No. 46 for the Arunachal Pradesh Legislative Assembly

Constituency details
- Country: India
- Region: Northeast India
- State: Arunachal Pradesh
- District: Namsai
- Lok Sabha constituency: Arunachal East
- Established: 1990
- Total electors: 14,338
- Reservation: ST

Member of Legislative Assembly
- 11th Arunachal Pradesh Legislative Assembly
- Incumbent Chowna Mein
- Party: Bharatiya Janata Party

Chowkham is one of the 60 Legislative Assembly constituencies of Arunachal Pradesh state in India.

It is part of Namsai district and is reserved for candidates belonging to the Scheduled Tribes. As of 2019, it is represented by Chowna Mein of the Bharatiya Janata Party.

== Members of the Legislative Assembly ==
Year	Member	Party
1990	Sokio Dellang	Independent politician
1995	Chow Tewa Mein	Indian National Congress
1999	Indrajit Namchoom	Independent politician
2004	Chow Tewa Mein	Bharatiya Janata Party
2009	Chow Tewa Mein	Indian National Congress
2014	Chow Tewa Mein	Indian National Congress
2019	Chowna Mein	Bharatiya Janata Party
2024	Chowna Mein	Bharatiya Janata Party

== Election results ==
=== Assembly Election 2024 ===
2024 Arunachal Pradesh Legislative Assembly election: Chowkham
Party	Candidate	Votes	%	±%
BJP	Chowna Mein	Unopposed		
Registered electors		14,338		▲1.80
BJP hold		Swing		

=== Assembly Election 2019 ===
2019 Arunachal Pradesh Legislative Assembly election: Chowkham
Party	Candidate	Votes	%	±%
BJP	Chowna Mein	8,908	82.03%	▲55.24
INC	Khunang Kri	1,617	14.89%	▼40.79
NOTA	None of the Above	334	3.08%	▲1.38
Margin of victory		7,291	67.14%	▲38.25
Turnout		10,859	77.10%	▲0.62
Registered electors		14,084		▲7.54
BJP gain from INC		Swing	▲26.35	

=== Assembly Election 2014 ===
2014 Arunachal Pradesh Legislative Assembly election: Chowkham
Party	Candidate	Votes	%	±%
INC	Chowna Mein	5,578	55.69%	▼5.26
BJP	Sotai Kri	2,684	26.79%	New
Independent	Chow Rajanam Namchoom	802	8.01%	New
Independent	Sotothalai	783	7.82%	New
NOTA	None of the Above	170	1.70%	New
Margin of victory		2,894	28.89%	▲6.99
Turnout		10,017	76.48%	▼1.18
Registered electors		13,097		▼1.27
INC hold		Swing	▼5.26	

=== Assembly Election 2009 ===
2009 Arunachal Pradesh Legislative Assembly election: Chowkham
Party	Candidate	Votes	%	±%
INC	Chowna Mein	6,279	60.95%	▲40.37
NCP	Chow Chinakong Namchoom	4,023	39.05%	▲29.48
Margin of victory		2,256	21.90%	▲14.31
Turnout		10,302	77.66%	▲14.72
Registered electors		13,265		▼0.16
INC gain from BJP		Swing		

=== Assembly Election 2004 ===
2004 Arunachal Pradesh Legislative Assembly election: Chowkham
Party	Candidate	Votes	%	±%
BJP	Chowna Mein	2,431	29.07%	▲23.25
Independent	Chow Indrajit Namchoom	1,796	21.48%	New
INC	Nang Frica Namshum	1,721	20.58%	▼18.93
Independent	Sokio Dellang	1,615	19.31%	New
NCP	Chow Noumee Namshoom	800	9.57%	New
Margin of victory		635	7.59%	▼7.58
Turnout		8,363	62.95%	▼2.21
Registered electors		13,286		▲6.88
BJP gain from Independent		Swing	▼25.61	

=== Assembly Election 1999 ===
1999 Arunachal Pradesh Legislative Assembly election: Chowkham
Party	Candidate	Votes	%	±%
Independent	Indrajit Namchoom	4,429	54.68%	New
INC	Chowna Mein	3,200	39.51%	▼8.05
BJP	Tasaso Yun	471	5.81%	▲2.79
Margin of victory		1,229	15.17%	▲4.59
Turnout		8,100	67.81%	▼14.99
Registered electors		12,431		▲24.91
Independent gain from INC		Swing		

=== Assembly Election 1995 ===
1995 Arunachal Pradesh Legislative Assembly election: Chowkham
Party	Candidate	Votes	%	±%
INC	Chowna Mein	3,793	47.56%	▲26.08
JD	Indrajit Namchoom	2,949	36.97%	▲11.75
JP	Sokio Dellang	993	12.45%	New
BJP	Tasaso Yun	241	3.02%	New
Margin of victory		844	10.58%	▲4.55
Turnout		7,976	82.34%	▲4.00
Registered electors		9,952		▲34.41
INC gain from Independent		Swing	▲16.30	

=== Assembly Election 1990 ===
1990 Arunachal Pradesh Legislative Assembly election: Chowkham
Party	Candidate	Votes	%	±%
Independent	Sokio Dellang	1,762	31.25%	New
JD	Chowna Mein	1,422	25.22%	New
Independent	Chow Chandret Gohain	1,243	22.05%	New
INC	Chow Tiyat Manjeykhun	1,211	21.48%	New
Margin of victory		340	6.03%	
Turnout		5,638	77.66%	
Registered electors		7,404		
Independent win (new seat)				

== See also ==
- List of constituencies of the Arunachal Pradesh Legislative Assembly
- Namsai district
