= Phurpa Tsering =

Indian politician

Member of the Arunachal Pradesh Legislative Assembly

Phurpa Tsering is an Indian politician of the Bharatiya Janata Party in Arunachal Pradesh.

He served as the president of the Dirang Bloc Congress Committee between 2001 and 2003, later serving as the West Kameng District Youth Congress president from 2003 to 2005. He was elected unopposed to the West Kameng Zilla Parishad, representing the Thembang Block. Between 2007 and 2008 he served as the chairman of the Zilla Parishad as well as president of the West Kameng District Congress Committee.

Tsering stood as a People's Party of Arunachal candidate in the Dirang constituency and was elected to the Arunachal Pradesh Legislative Assembly in the 2009 election, defeating the incumbent Indian National Congress MLA Tsering Gyurme, obtaining 6,618 votes against 5,085 votes for Gyurme. In June 2012 Tsering was named Parliamentary Secretary for Science and Technology by Chief Minister Nabam Tuki.

Tsering was re-elected unopposed from Dirang in the 2014 Arunachal Pradesh Legislative Assembly election as well as in the 2019 and 2024 Arunachal Pradesh Legislative Assembly election.
