= Bomdila Assembly constituency =

Legislative Assembly constituency in Arunachal Pradesh State, India

Coordinates: 27.26°N 92.42°E

Bomdila
- Constituency No. 7 for the Arunachal Pradesh Legislative Assembly

Constituency details
- Country: India
- Region: Northeast India
- State: Arunachal Pradesh
- District: West Kameng
- Lok Sabha constituency: Arunachal West
- Established: 1978
- Total electors: 10,840
- Reservation: ST

Member of Legislative Assembly
- 11th Arunachal Pradesh Legislative Assembly
- Incumbent Dongru Siongju
- Party: Bharatiya Janata Party

Bomdila is one of the 60 Legislative Assembly constituencies of Arunachal Pradesh state in India.

It is part of West Kameng district and is reserved for candidates belonging to the Scheduled Tribes.

== Members of the Legislative Assembly ==
Election	Name	Party
1978	Rinchin Kharu	Janata Party
1980	Sinam Dususow Bomdila	People's Party of Arunachal
1984	Japu Deru	People's Party of Arunachal
1990	Japu Deru	Indian National Congress
1995	Japu Deru	Indian National Congress
1999	Japu Deru	Indian National Congress
2004	R. T. Khunjuju	Bharatiya Janata Party
2009	R. T. Khunjuju	Indian National Congress
2014	Japu Deru	Bharatiya Janata Party
2019	Dongru Siongju	Janata Dal
2024	Dongru Siongju	Bharatiya Janata Party

== Election results ==
=== Assembly Election 2024 ===
2024 Arunachal Pradesh Legislative Assembly election: Bomdila
Party	Candidate	Votes	%	±%
BJP	Dongru Siongju	Unopposed		
Registered electors		10,840		▲7.73
BJP gain from JD(U)		Swing		

=== Assembly Election 2019 ===
2019 Arunachal Pradesh Legislative Assembly election: Bomdila
Party	Candidate	Votes	%	±%
JD(U)	Dongru Siongju	2,994	37.15%	New
BJP	Japu Deru	2,761	34.26%	▼18.96
NPP	Aju Khonjuju	1,652	20.50%	New
INC	R. T. Khunjuju	547	6.79%	▼38.04
NOTA	None of the Above	105	1.30%	New
Margin of victory		233	2.89%	▼5.50
Turnout		8,059	80.09%	▲1.83
Registered electors		10,062		▼3.56
JD(U) gain from BJP		Swing	▼16.06	

=== Assembly Election 2014 ===
2014 Arunachal Pradesh Legislative Assembly election: Bomdila
Party	Candidate	Votes	%	±%
BJP	Japu Deru	4,345	53.21%	▲50.22
INC	R. T. Khunjuju	3,660	44.83%	▼6.13
NOTA	None of the Above	160	1.96%	New
Margin of victory		685	8.39%	▲3.47
Turnout		8,165	78.26%	▲6.05
Registered electors		10,433		▼5.48
BJP gain from INC		Swing		

=== Assembly Election 2009 ===
2009 Arunachal Pradesh Legislative Assembly election: Bomdila
Party	Candidate	Votes	%	±%
INC	R. T. Khunjuju	4,062	50.96%	▲12.80
NCP	Japu Deru	3,670	46.04%	▲43.78
BJP	Sambu Siongju	239	3.00%	▼43.65
Margin of victory		392	4.92%	▼3.58
Turnout		7,971	72.21%	▲8.10
Registered electors		11,038		▲11.73
INC gain from BJP		Swing		

=== Assembly Election 2004 ===
2004 Arunachal Pradesh Legislative Assembly election: Bomdila
Party	Candidate	Votes	%	±%
BJP	R. T. Khunjuju	2,955	46.65%	▲29.62
INC	Japu Deru	2,417	38.16%	▼6.52
Independent	Prem Khandu Thungon	819	12.93%	New
NCP	Sherge Thungon	143	2.26%	New
Margin of victory		538	8.49%	▲2.10
Turnout		6,334	61.17%	▲0.94
Registered electors		9,879		▲10.88
BJP gain from INC		Swing	▲1.97	

=== Assembly Election 1999 ===
1999 Arunachal Pradesh Legislative Assembly election: Bomdila
Party	Candidate	Votes	%	±%
INC	Japu Deru	2,515	44.68%	▼12.28
Independent	R. T. Khunjuju	2,155	38.28%	New
BJP	Khiren Rijiju	959	17.04%	New
Margin of victory		360	6.40%	▼7.53
Turnout		5,629	66.54%	▼11.80
Registered electors		8,910		▲13.32
INC hold		Swing		

=== Assembly Election 1995 ===
1995 Arunachal Pradesh Legislative Assembly election: Bomdila
Party	Candidate	Votes	%	±%
INC	Japu Deru	3,358	56.96%	▼1.61
Independent	R. T. Khunjuju	2,537	43.04%	New
Margin of victory		821	13.93%	▼3.22
Turnout		5,895	77.54%	▲3.73
Registered electors		7,863		▲15.56
INC hold		Swing		

=== Assembly Election 1990 ===
1990 Arunachal Pradesh Legislative Assembly election: Bomdila
Party	Candidate	Votes	%	±%
INC	Japu Deru	2,839	58.57%	▲25.53
JD	Rinchin Kharu	2,008	41.43%	New
Margin of victory		831	17.14%	▲14.16
Turnout		4,847	72.41%	▼0.63
Registered electors		6,804		▼6.99
INC gain from PPA		Swing		

=== Assembly Election 1984 ===
1984 Arunachal Pradesh Legislative Assembly election: Bomdila
Party	Candidate	Votes	%	±%
PPA	Japu Deru	1,894	36.03%	▼16.66
INC	Sinam Dususow	1,737	33.04%	New
Independent	Naresh Glow	983	18.70%	New
Independent	Rinchin Kharu	514	9.78%	New
Independent	Cheten Droma	77	1.46%	New
Independent	Jammu Khynjiuzu	52	0.99%	New
Margin of victory		157	2.99%	▼2.40
Turnout		5,257	77.05%	▲4.58
Registered electors		7,315		▲21.59
PPA hold		Swing	▼16.66	

=== Assembly Election 1980 ===
1980 Arunachal Pradesh Legislative Assembly election: Bomdila
Party	Candidate	Votes	%	±%
PPA	Sinam Dususow Bomdila	2,133	52.69%	New
INC(I)	Rinchin Kharu Nafra	1,915	47.31%	New
Margin of victory		218	5.39%	▼41.60
Turnout		4,048	72.16%	▼5.58
Registered electors		6,016		▲17.85
PPA gain from JP		Swing	▼20.80	

=== Assembly Election 1978 ===
1978 Arunachal Pradesh Legislative Assembly election: Bomdila
Party	Candidate	Votes	%	±%
JP	Rinchin Kharu	2,734	73.49%	New
Independent	Dorjee Tsering	986	26.51%	New
Margin of victory		1,748	46.99%	
Turnout		3,720	75.69%	
Registered electors		5,105		
JP win (new seat)				

== See also ==
- List of constituencies of the Arunachal Pradesh Legislative Assembly
- West Kameng district
