= Namsang Assembly constituency =

Legislative Assembly constituency in Arunachal Pradesh State, India

Coordinates: 27.11°N 95.51°E

Namsang
- Constituency No. 54 for the Arunachal Pradesh Legislative Assembly

Constituency details
- Country: India
- Region: Northeast India
- State: Arunachal Pradesh
- District: Tirap
- Lok Sabha constituency: Arunachal East
- Total electors: 9,491
- Reservation: ST

Member of Legislative Assembly
- 11th Arunachal Pradesh Legislative Assembly
- Incumbent Wangki Lowang
- Party: Bharatiya Janata Party

Namsang is one of the 60 Legislative Assembly constituencies of Arunachal Pradesh state in India.

It is part of Tirap district and is reserved for candidates belonging to the Scheduled Tribes. As of 2019, it is represented by Wangki Lowang of the Bharatiya Janata Party.

== Members of the Legislative Assembly ==
Year	Member	Party
1990	Wangpha Lowang	Indian National Congress
1995	Wangcha Rajkumar	Independent politician
1999	Wangki Lowang	Nationalist Congress Party
2004	Wangki Lowang	Indian National Congress
2009	Wangki Lowang	Indian National Congress
2014	Wangki Lowang	Indian National Congress
2019	Wangki Lowang	Bharatiya Janata Party
2024	Wangki Lowang	Bharatiya Janata Party

== Election results ==
=== Assembly Election 2024 ===
2024 Arunachal Pradesh Legislative Assembly election : Namsang
Party	Candidate	Votes	%	±%
BJP	Wangki Lowang	3,781	49.65%	▲4.57
NCP	Ngonglin Boi	3,725	48.92%	New
NOTA	None of the Above	109	1.43%	▲0.12
Margin of victory		56	0.74%	▼22.95
Turnout		7,615	80.23%	▲2.92
Registered electors		9,491		▲3.32
BJP hold		Swing	▲4.57	

=== Assembly Election 2019 ===
2019 Arunachal Pradesh Legislative Assembly election : Namsang
Party	Candidate	Votes	%	±%
BJP	Wangki Lowang	3,202	45.09%	▲15.44
JD(U)	Ngonglin Boi	1,520	21.40%	New
NPP	Tawang Lowang	1,466	20.64%	New
INC	Litwang Lowang	821	11.56%	▼31.39
NOTA	None of the Above	93	1.31%	▼0.52
Margin of victory		1,682	23.68%	▲10.37
Turnout		7,102	77.31%	▲4.09
Registered electors		9,186		▼2.27
BJP gain from INC		Swing	▲2.13	

=== Assembly Election 2014 ===
2014 Arunachal Pradesh Legislative Assembly election : Namsang
Party	Candidate	Votes	%	±%
INC	Wangki Lowang	2,956	42.95%	▼25.64
BJP	Wanglong Rajkumar	2,040	29.64%	New
PPA	Arun Namati	1,760	25.57%	New
NOTA	None of the Above	126	1.83%	New
Margin of victory		916	13.31%	▼23.87
Turnout		6,882	73.22%	▼2.24
Registered electors		9,399		▼2.08
INC hold		Swing	▼25.64	

=== Assembly Election 2009 ===
2009 Arunachal Pradesh Legislative Assembly election : Namsang
Party	Candidate	Votes	%	±%
INC	Wangki Lowang	4,968	68.59%	▲6.46
NCP	Wanglong Rajkumar	2,275	31.41%	New
Margin of victory		2,693	37.18%	▼1.82
Turnout		7,243	75.46%	▲13.01
Registered electors		9,599		▲7.98
INC hold		Swing		

=== Assembly Election 2004 ===
2004 Arunachal Pradesh Legislative Assembly election : Namsang
Party	Candidate	Votes	%	±%
INC	Wangki Lowang	3,449	62.13%	▲14.33
Independent	Wangpha Lowang	1,284	23.13%	New
Independent	Windong Sawin	818	14.74%	New
Margin of victory		2,165	39.00%	▲34.60
Turnout		5,551	61.23%	▲2.59
Registered electors		8,890		▲5.88
INC gain from NCP		Swing		

=== Assembly Election 1999 ===
1999 Arunachal Pradesh Legislative Assembly election : Namsang
Party	Candidate	Votes	%	±%
NCP	Wangki Lowang	2,623	52.20%	New
INC	Changkom Hondik	2,402	47.80%	▲8.36
Margin of victory		221	4.40%	▼16.72
Turnout		5,025	61.61%	▼23.39
Registered electors		8,396		▲10.17
NCP gain from Independent		Swing		

=== Assembly Election 1995 ===
1995 Arunachal Pradesh Legislative Assembly election : Namsang
Party	Candidate	Votes	%	±%
Independent	Wangcha Rajkumar	3,842	60.56%	New
INC	Wangpha Lowang	2,502	39.44%	▼0.76
Margin of victory		1,340	21.12%	▲17.86
Turnout		6,344	84.70%	▲7.79
Registered electors		7,621		▲30.45
Independent gain from INC		Swing		

=== Assembly Election 1990 ===
1990 Arunachal Pradesh Legislative Assembly election : Namsang
Party	Candidate	Votes	%	±%
INC	Wangpha Lowang	1,772	40.20%	New
JD	Ngongbey Kanglom	1,628	36.93%	New
Independent	Hatwang Lowang	1,008	22.87%	New
Margin of victory		144	3.27%	
Turnout		4,408	76.87%	
Registered electors		5,842		
INC win (new seat)				

== See also ==
- List of constituencies of the Arunachal Pradesh Legislative Assembly
- Tirap district
