= Likha Saaya =

Indian politician

Likha Saaya (born 1973) is an Indian politician from the state of Arunachal Pradesh.

Saaya was elected unopposed from the Yachuli seat in the 2014 Arunachal Pradesh Legislative Assembly election, standing as a People's Party of Arunachal candidate.

Saaya later joined the NCP, now serving as the state president of the party. He contested unsuccessfully from the Namsai Assembly constituency in the 2024 elections.

== See also ==
- Arunachal Pradesh Legislative Assembly
