= Along East =

Along East is a place in the Indian state of Arunachal Pradesh. West Siang is the name of the district that contains Tehsil Along East.

Along East is located in West Siang, district administrative headquarter is West Siang. Nearest airport to this place is located at Lilabari (in Assam), which is 150 km from Along . It is one of the 60 constituencies of Legislative Assembly of Arunachal Pradesh. Name of current MLA (October-2016) of this constituency is Jarkar Gamlin.

== See also ==
- List of constituencies of Arunachal Pradesh Legislative Assembly
- Arunachal Pradesh Legislative Assembly
