= Olom Panyang =

Indian politician

Olom Panyang is an Indian politician from the state of Arunachal Pradesh.

Panyang was elected from the Mariyang-Geku constituency in the 2014 Arunachal Pradesh Legislative Assembly election, standing as a BJP candidate.

== See also ==
- Arunachal Pradesh Legislative Assembly
