= Pani Taram =

Indian politician

Member of the Arunachal Pradesh Legislative Assembly

Pani Taram (born 7 July 1975) is an Indian politician from the State of Arunachal Pradesh, He is the member of Arunachal Pradesh legislative assembly from Koloriang Assembly constituency.

== Education ==
He was Graduated from Jawahar lal Nehru College, Pasighat, Arunachal Pradesh. He is a Science Graduate, B.Sc (Hons) by Qualification and 2 yrs PG Diploma in Fisheries Science from Central Institute of Fisheries Education, Saltlake City, Kolkotta (WB) under Deemed University of Fisheries Science, Mumbai.

== Career ==
He has served as parliamentary secretary for Home, Education and Agriculture to the Government of Arunachal Pradesh in BJP Govt. He defeated the two times MLA, Lokam Tassar, from 21-Koloriang (ST) Assembly Constituency in the 2014 Arunachal Pradesh Legislative Assembly election.

He resigned from his former government service, as the District Fisheries Development Officer (DFDO). Standing as a People's Party of Arunachal candidate. He is known for his Orator and Parliamentarian speeches on 6th Legislative Assembly, Arunachal Pradesh. Presently, he is working President of National People Party (NPP) State of Arunachal Pradesh.

As on 2024 general elections held in 19 April, Shri pani Taram has won the M.L.A elections with massive vote margin of gaining more than 10,000 votes in the Koloriang constituency and is now the MLA in the state of Arunachal Pradesh.

== See also ==
- Arunachal Pradesh Legislative Assembly
