= Dasanglu Pul =

Indian politician

Minister of Women & Child Development, Cultural Affairs, and Science & Technology, Government of Arunachal Pradesh
- In office 12 June 2024 – Incumbent
- Chief Minister: Pema Khandu

Member of Arunachal Pradesh Legislative Assembly
- In office 19 November 2016 – Incumbent
- Preceded by: Kalikho Pul
- Constituency: Hayuliang

Personal details
- Born: 1 November 1977 (age 48) Sarti village, Walong circle, Anjaw district
- Party: Bharatiya Janata Party
- Spouse: Kalikho Pul
- Parent(s): Tanglaiso Tulang (Father); Pikhansi Pul Tulang (Mother)
- Education: 12th
- Alma mater: National Institute of Open Schooling
- Profession: Politician, Social Worker

Dasanglu Pul is an Indian politician, a member of Bharatiya Janata Party from Arunachal Pradesh. She was first elected to the Arunachal Pradesh Legislative Assembly in 2016 from Hayuliang. She was one of the wives of Kalikho Pul, who served as Chief Minister of the north-eastern state of Arunachal Pradesh for a brief period in 2016. On 26 April 2023, the Guwahati High Court declared her election win in 2019 Arunachal Pradesh Legislative Assembly election as null and void due to concealment of information on her election affidavit.

She was the first woman Cabinet Minister of Arunachal Pradesh in the Pema Khandu Cabinet and was put in charge of Women & Child Development, Cultural Affairs, and Science & Technology.

== See also ==
- Hayuliang Assembly constituency
- List of constituencies of the Arunachal Pradesh Legislative Assembly
- Arunachal Pradesh Legislative Assembly
