= Lombo Tayeng =

Indian politician

Lombo Tayeng is an Indian politician from the state of Arunachal Pradesh.

Tayeng was firsr elected unopposed from the Mebo constituency in the 2014 Arunachal Pradesh Legislative Assembly election, standing as an Indian National Congress candidate. He was re-elected in the 2019 Arunachal Pradesh Legislative Assembly election. He is a graduate (B.A.) by qualification.

Lombo Tayeng joined the BJP at the party’s state headquarters in Itanagar on 4 March 2024.

== See also ==
- Arunachal Pradesh Legislative Assembly
