= Tanpho Wangnaw =

Indian politician

Tangpho Wangnaw

Member of the Arunachal Pradesh Legislative Assembly
- Incumbent
- Assumed office 2019
- Constituency: Longding–Pumao

Personal details
- Born: 1966 (age 59–60)
- Party: Bharatiya Janata Party
- Parent: Ponglam Wangnaw (father)
- Education: B.A.
- Alma mater: Jawahar Lal Nehru College, Pasighat
- Profession: Businessman

Tanpho Wangnaw is an Indian politician from Arunachal Pradesh. He was elected to the Arunachal Pradesh Legislative Assembly from the Longding–Pumao Assembly constituency in the 2019 Arunachal Pradesh Legislative Assembly election as a member of the Bharatiya Janata Party.
