= Kamlung Mossang =

Indian politician

Member of the Arunachal Pradesh Legislative Assembly

Kamlung Mossang is an Indian politician from the Bharatiya Janata Party.

Mossang was elected from the Miao constituency in the 2014 and 2019 Arunachal Pradesh Legislative Assembly elections. In terms of educational qualification, he is a graduate (B.A.).

Mossang was one of 6 MLAs, along with Chief Minister Pema Khandu, to be suspended by the PPA for anti-party activities.

Kamlung Mossang also served as Minister for Urban Development and Housing in the Pema Khandu Ministry.

== See also ==
- Arunachal Pradesh Legislative Assembly
