= Mama Natung =

Indian businessman and politician

Member of the Arunachal Pradesh Legislative Assembly

Mama Natung is an Indian businessman and politician from the Bharatiya Janata Party.

Natung was elected unopposed from the Seppa West seat in the 2014 Arunachal Pradesh Legislative Assembly election, standing as an Indian National Congress candidate.
