= Chau Zingnu Namchoom =

Indian politician

Member of Arunachal Pradesh Legislative Assembly
- Incumbent
- Assumed office 1 June 2024
- Preceded by: Chowna Mein
- Constituency: Namsai

Personal details
- Party: Bharatiya Janata Party

Chau Zingnu Namchoom (born 1977) is an Indian politician from Arunachal Pradesh belonging to the Bharatiya Janata Party. He is a member of the Legislative Assembly in the 11th Arunachal Pradesh Legislative Assembly. He serves as the Member of Legislative Assembly (MLA) from the Namsai constituency in the Namsai, (earlier Lohit district) of Arunachal Pradesh.

== Political history ==
He belonged to the Indian National Congress until 2016 when he joined the People's Party of Arunachal and has been a member of the Arunachal Pradesh Legislative Assembly since 2014.

Zingnu Namchoom was one of 6 MLAs along with Chief Minister Pema Khandu to be suspended by the PPA for anti-party activities.

== Education ==
He graduated from the University of Delhi with a Bachelor of Arts degree in 1997.
