= Tani Loffa =

Indian politician

Tani Loffa is an Indian politician from Arunachal Pradesh. He belongs to the Bharatiya Janata Party.

In 2004, he was elected from East Kameng district's Seppa West assembly constituency of Arunachal Pradesh.
