= Thangwang Wangham =

Indian politician

Member of the Arunachal Pradesh Legislative Assembly

Thangwang Wangham is an Indian politician from the state of Arunachal Pradesh.

Wangham was elected from Longding-Pumao seat in the 2014 Arunachal Pradesh Legislative Assembly election, standing as a People's Party of Arunachal candidate. In terms of educational qualification, he is a graduate (B.A.).

He was appointed as the President of Arunachal Pradesh unit of National People's Party in 2023.

== See also ==
- Arunachal Pradesh Legislative Assembly
