= Arunachal East Lok Sabha constituency =

Lok Sabha Constituency in Arunachal Pradesh

Coordinates: 28.3°N 96.3°E

Arunachal East AR-2
- Lok Sabha constituency
- Interactive Map Outlining Arunachal East Lok Sabha constituency

Constituency details
- Country: India
- Region: Northeast India
- State: Arunachal Pradesh
- Assembly constituencies: 27:Tuting-Yingkiong, Pangin, Nari-Koyu, Pasighat West, Pasighat East, Mebo, Mariyang-Geku, Anini, Dambuk, Roing, Tezu, Hayuliang, Chowkham, Namsai, Lekang, Bordumsa-Diyun, Miao, Nampong, Changlang South, Changlang North, Namsang, Khonsa East, Khonsa West, Borduria-Bogapani, Kanubari, Longding-Pumao and Pongchau-Wakka
- Established: 1977
- Total electors: 3,75,310
- Reservation: None

Member of Parliament
- 18th Lok Sabha
- Incumbent Tapir Gao
- Party: BJP
- Alliance: NDA
- Elected year: 2024

Arunachal East Lok Sabha constituency is one of the two Lok Sabha (lower house of the Indian Parliament) constituencies in Arunachal Pradesh state in northeastern India. This constituency covers the entire Upper Siang, East Siang, Dibang Valley, Lower Dibang Valley, Lohit, Anjaw, Changlang and Tirap districts.

== Assembly segments ==
Presently, Arunachal East Lok Sabha constituency comprises the following 27 Assembly segments:

#	Name	District	Member	Party	Leading (2024 Lok Sabha)
34	Tuting-Yingkiong (ST)	Upper Siang	Alo Libang	BJP	INC
35	Pangin (ST)	Siang district	Ojing Tasing	BJP	INC
36	Nari-Koyu (ST)	Lower Siang	Tojir Kadu	BJP	INC
37	Pasighat West (ST)	East Siang	Ninong Ering	BJP	INC
38	Pasighat East (ST)	East Siang	Tapi Darang	NPP	INC
39	Mebo (ST)	East Siang	Oken Tayeng	PPA	INC
40	Mariyang-Geku (ST)	Upper Siang	Oni Panyang	NPP	INC
41	Anini (ST)	Dibang Valley	Mopi Mihu	BJP	BJP
42	Dambuk (ST)	Lower Dibang Valley	Puinnyo Apum	BJP	INC
43	Roing (ST)	Lower Dibang Valley	Mutchu Mithi	BJP	BJP
44	Tezu (ST)	Lohit	Mohesh Chai	BJP	BJP
45	Hayuliang (ST)	Anjaw	Dasanglu Pul	BJP	BJP
46	Chowkham (ST)	Namsai	Chowna Mein	BJP	BJP
47	Namsai (ST)	Namsai	Chau Zingnu Namchoom	BJP	BJP
48	Lekang (ST)	Namsai	Lekhiya Soni	NCP	BJP
49	Bordumsa-Diyun	Changlang	Nikh Kamin	NCP	BJP
50	Miao (ST)	Changlang	Kamlung Mossang	BJP	BJP
51	Nampong (ST)	Changlang	Laisam Simai	IND	INC
52	Changlang South (ST)	Changlang	Hamjong Tangha	BJP	BJP
53	Changlang North (ST)	Changlang	Tesam Pongte	BJP	BJP
54	Namsang (ST)	Tirap	Wangki Lowang	BJP	BJP
55	Khonsa East (ST)	Tirap	Wanglam Sawin	IND	INC
56	Khonsa West (ST)	Tirap	Chakat Aboh	BJP	BJP
57	Borduria-Bogapani (ST)	Tirap	Wanglin Lowangdong	BJP	BJP
58	Kanubari (ST)	Longding	Gabriel Denwang Wangsu	BJP	INC
59	Longding-Pumao (ST)	Longding	Thangwang Wangham	NPP	INC
60	Pongchau-Wakka (ST)	Longding	Honchun Ngandam	BJP	BJP

== Members of Parliament ==
Year	Member	Party
Nominated Members of Parliament (1951–1977)
1951	Chow Khamoon Gohain	Indian National Congress
1957	Chow Khamoon Gohain	Indian National Congress
1962	Daying Ering	Indian National Congress
1967	Daying Ering	Indian National Congress
1970^	Chow Chandret Gohain	Indian National Congress
1971	Chow Chandret Gohain	Indian National Congress
Arunachal East Lok Sabha Constituency
1977	Bakin Pertin	Independent
1980	Sobeng Tayeng	Indian National Congress (I)
1984	Wangpha Lowang	Indian National Congress
1989	Laeta Umbrey	Indian National Congress
1991	Laeta Umbrey	Indian National Congress
1996	Wangcha Rajkumar	Independent
1998	Wangcha Rajkumar	Arunachal Congress
1999	Wangcha Rajkumar	Indian National Congress
2004	Tapir Gao	Bharatiya Janata Party
2009	Ninong Ering	Indian National Congress
2014	Ninong Ering	Indian National Congress
2019	Tapir Gao	Bharatiya Janata Party
2024	Tapir Gao	Bharatiya Janata Party

== Election results ==
Vote share of Winning candidates
2024	45.70%
2019	52.04%
2014	45.01%
2009	53.70%
2004	51.01%
1999	58.21%
1998	50.59%
1996	33.73%
1991	65.53%
1989	59.58%
1984	43.87%
1980	46.29%
1977	56.34%

=== 2024 ===
2024 Indian general election: Arunachal East
Party	Candidate	Votes	%	±%
BJP	Tapir Gao	145,581	45.70	▼6.34
INC	Bosiram Siram	115,160	36.15	▲7.77
IND	Tamat Gamoh	27,603	8.67	
IND	Sotai Kri	14,213	4.46	
IND	Omak Nitik	9,369	2.94	
ADP	Bandey Mili	6,622	2.08	
NOTA	None of the Above	4,895	1.54	▼0.35
Majority		30,421	9.55	▼14.11
Turnout		326,063	86.18	▼0.28
BJP hold		Swing		

=== 2019 ===
2019 Indian general election: Arunachal East
Party	Candidate	Votes	%	±%
BJP	Tapir Gao	153,883	52.04	▲11.77
INC	Lowangcha Wanglat	83,935	28.38	▼16.63
PPA	Mongol Yomso	22,937	7.76	▼4.53
JD(S)	Bandey Mili	15,958	5.40	
IND	C. C. Singpho	11,493	3.89	
NOTA	None of the Above	5,575	1.89	▲0.18
Majority		69,948	23.66	▲18.92
Turnout		293,781	86.46	▲2.30
BJP gain from INC		Swing		

=== 2014 ===
2014 Indian general election: Arunachal East
Party	Candidate	Votes	%	±%
INC	Ninong Ering	118,455	45.01	▼8.69
BJP	Tapir Gao	105,977	40.27	▲18.41
PPA	Wangman Lowangcha	32,354	12.29	▲9.50
NOTA	None of the Above	4,505	1.71	
Majority		12,478	4.74	▼27.10
Turnout		263,157	84.16	▲12.79
INC hold		Swing		

=== 2009 ===
2009 Indian general election: Arunachal East
Party	Candidate	Votes	%	±%
INC	Ninong Ering	115,423	53.70	▲30.23
BJP	Tapir Gao	46,974	21.86	▼29.15
AC	Lowangcha Wanglat	46,539	21.65	
PPA	Dr. Samson Borang	5,996	2.79	
Majority		68,449	31.84	▲4.30
Turnout		214,932	71.37	▲14.81
INC gain from BJP		Swing		

=== 2004 ===
2004 Indian general election: Arunachal East
Party	Candidate	Votes	%	±%
BJP	Tapir Gao	83,335	51.01	▲14.56
INC	Wangcha Rajkumar	38,341	23.47	▼34.74
IND	Tony Pertin	17,009	10.41	
IND	Matwang Chimyang	16,476	10.09	
IND	Ogong Tamuk	5,251	3.21	
IND	Onom Taknyo	2,962	1.81	
Majority		44,994	27.54	▲5.78
Turnout		163,374	56.56	▼17.38
BJP gain from INC		Swing		

=== 1999 ===
1999 Indian general election: Arunachal East
Party	Candidate	Votes	%	±%
INC	Wangcha Rajkumar	110,792	58.21	▲43.70
BJP	Tapir Gao	69,389	36.45	▲6.13
AJBP	Chau Khouk Manpoong	10,163	5.34	
Majority		41,403	21.76	▲1.49
Turnout		196,263	73.94	▲16.78
INC gain from AC		Swing		

=== 1998 ===
1998 Indian general election: Arunachal East
Party	Candidate	Votes	%	±%
AC	Wangcha Rajkumar	68,455	50.59	
BJP	Sotai Kri	41,018	30.32	▲5.45
INC	Wangpha Lowang	19,628	14.51	▼13.48
JD	Tokmin Borang	6,199	4.58	
Majority		27,437	20.27	▲14.53
Turnout		138,059	57.16	▲1.48
AC gain from Independent		Swing		

=== 1996 ===
1996 Indian general election: Arunachal East
Party	Candidate	Votes	%	±%
IND	Wangcha Rajkumar	42,784	33.73	
INC	Laeta Umbrey	35,513	27.99	▼37.54
BJP	Sotai Kri	31,550	24.87	▲15.62
IND	J. K. Panggeng	9,387	7.40	
IND	Chau Tan Manpoong	6,881	5.42	
IND	Kashme Lingi	742	0.58	
Majority		7,271	5.74	▼35.22
Turnout		129,892	55.68	▼0.41
Independent gain from INC		Swing		

=== 1991 ===
1991 Indian general election: Arunachal East
Party	Candidate	Votes	%	±%
INC	Laeta Umbrey	76,575	65.53	▲5.95
JD	Chau Khouk Manpoong	28,712	24.57	
BJP	Cahu Tan Manpoong	10,813	9.25	
IND	Tabang Jamoh	754	0.65	
Majority		47,863	40.96	▲14.45
Turnout		119,376	56.09	▼9.66
INC hold		Swing		

=== 1989 ===
1989 Indian general election: Arunachal East
Party	Candidate	Votes	%	±%
INC	Laeta Umbrey	73,294	59.58	▲15.71
PPA	L. Wanglat	40,680	33.07	▲9.31
IND	Khapriso Krong	9,040	7.35	
Majority		32,614	26.51	▲6.40
Turnout		127,260	65.75	▼8.02
INC hold		Swing		

=== 1984 ===
1984 Indian general election: Arunachal East
Party	Candidate	Votes	%	±%
INC	Wangpha Lowang	41,912	43.87	
PPA	Bakin Pertin	22,697	23.76	▼19.30
IND	L. Wanglat	12,538	13.12	
IND	Gora Pertin	9,853	10.31	
IND	D. S. Pokwang	8,530	8.93	
Majority		19,215	20.11	▲16.88
Turnout		100,234	73.77	▲5.68
INC gain from INC(I)		Swing		

=== 1980 ===
1980 Indian general election: Arunachal East
Party	Candidate	Votes	%	±%
INC(I)	Sobeng Tayeng	34,864	46.29	
PPA	Bakin Pertin	32,429	43.06	
INC(U)	K. T. Longchang	8,020	10.65	
Majority		2,435	3.23	▼11.86
Turnout		78,311	68.09	▲11.82
INC(I) gain from Independent		Swing		

=== 1977 ===
1977 Indian general election: Arunachal East
Party	Candidate	Votes	%	±%
IND	Bakin Pertin	28,557	56.34	
INC	Nyodek Yonggam	20,909	41.25	
IND	Aken Lego	1,224	2.41	
Majority		7,648	15.09	
Turnout		50,690	56.27	
Independent win (new seat)				

== See also ==
- Arunachal West Lok Sabha constituency
- List of constituencies of the Lok Sabha
