= 2019 Indian general election in Arunachal Pradesh =

State election for the 17th Lok Sabha

- 11 April 2019

2 seats
- Turnout: 82.11% (▲3.50%)

	First party	Second party
Party	BJP	INC
Alliance	NDA	UPA
Last election	1	1
Seats won	2	0
Seat change	▲1	▼1
Percentage	58.2%	20.69%
Swing	▲12.1%	▼20.51%
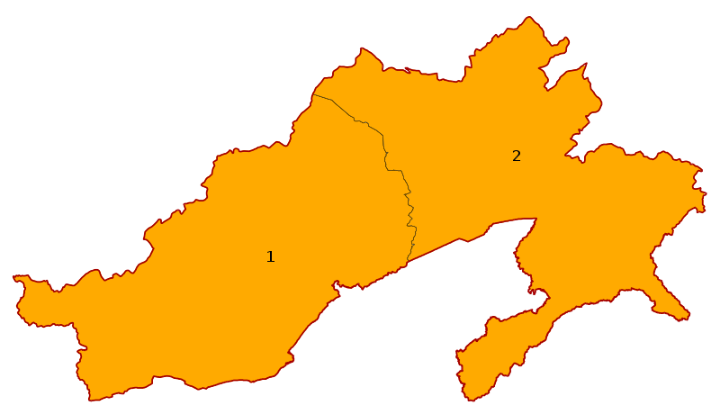
- Arunachal Pradesh
Prime Minister before election
Narendra Modi
BJP
Prime Minister after election
Narendra Modi
BJP

The 2019 Indian general election were held in India on 11 April 2019 to constitute the 17th Lok Sabha.

== Parties and alliances ==
=== National Democratic Alliance ===
Party	Flag	Symbol	Leader	Seats contested
Bharatiya Janata Party			Kiren Rijiju	2

=== United Progressive Alliance ===
Party	Flag	Symbol	Leader	Seats contested
Indian National Congress			Nabam Tuki	2

== Candidates ==
Constituency					
Constituency		NDA		UPA	
1	Arunachal West	BJP	Kiren Rijiju	INC	Nabam Tuki
2	Arunachal East	BJP	Tapir Gao	INC	James Lowangcha Wanglat

== Results ==
=== Results by Party ===
Party Name	Popular vote			Seats		
Party Name	Votes	%	±pp	Contested	Won	+/−
BJP	3,79,679	58.22	▲12.10	2	2	▲1
INC	1,34,888	20.69	▼20.53	2	0	▼1
JD(S)	59,878	9.18	New entry	2	0	Steady
PPA	27,703	4.25	▼3.63	2	0	Steady
NPEP	27,119	4.16	New entry	1	0	Steady
AIFB	1,921	0.29	New entry	1	0	Steady
IND	13,439	2.06	▲1.66	2	0	Steady
NOTA	7,464	1.14	▲0.08			
Total	6,52,091	100%	-	12	2	-

=== Detailed Result ===
Constituency		Winner				Runner-up				Margin	
Constituency		Candidate	Party	Votes	%	Candidate	Party	Votes	%	Votes	%
1	Arunachal West	Kiren Rijiju	BJP	225,796	62.02	Nabam Tuki	INC	50,953	14.00	174,843	48.02
2	Arunachal East	Tapir Gao	BJP	153,883	52.04	Lowangcha Wanglat	INC	83,935	28.38	69,948	23.66

== Post-election Union Council of Ministers from Arunachal Pradesh ==
#	Name	Constituency	Designation	Department	From	To	Party
1	Kiren Rijiju	Arunachal West	MoS (I/C)	Ministry of Youth Affairs and Sports	31 May 2019	7 July 2021	BJP
1	Kiren Rijiju	Arunachal West	MoS	Ministry of Minority Affairs	31 May 2019	7 July 2021	BJP
1	Kiren Rijiju	Arunachal West	MoS (I/C)	Ministry of AYUSH (Additional Charge)	19 January 2021	7 July 2021	BJP
1	Kiren Rijiju	Arunachal West	Cabinet Minister	Ministry of Law and Justice	7 July 2021	18 May 2023	BJP
1	Kiren Rijiju	Arunachal West	Cabinet Minister	Ministry of Earth Sciences	18 May 2023	9 June 2024	BJP
1	Kiren Rijiju	Arunachal West	Cabinet Minister	Ministry of Food Processing Industries (Additional Charge)	20 March 2024	9 June 2024	BJP

== Assembly segments wise lead of parties ==
Party	Assembly segments	Position in Assembly (as of 2019 simultaneous elections)
Bharatiya Janata Party	55	41
Janata Dal (United)	-	7
Indian National Congress	4	4
Janata Dal (Secular)	1	0
National People's Party	-	5
People's Party of Arunachal	-	1
Independent	-	2
Total	60	
