= List of Rajya Sabha members from Arunachal Pradesh =

The Rajya Sabha (meaning the "Council of States") is the upper house of the Parliament of India. Arunachal Pradesh elects 1 seat and they are indirectly elected by the state legislators of Arunachal Pradesh, since 1972. Elections within the state legislatures are held using Single transferable vote with proportional representation.

== List of all Rajya Sabha Members from Arunachal Pradesh ==
Name	Party	Term start	Term end	Term
Tai Tagak	BJP	24-Jun-2026	23-Jun-2032	1
Nabam Rebia	BJP	24-Jun-2020	23-Jun-2026	3
Mukut Mithi	INC	24-Jun-2014	23-Jun-2020	2
Mukut Mithi	INC	27-May-2008	26-May-2014	1
Nabam Rebia	INC	27-May-2002	26-May-2008	2
Nabam Rebia	INC	27-May-1996	26-May-2002	1
Yonggam Nyodek	INC	27-May-1990	26-May-1996	1
Deori Omem Moyong	INC	27-May-1984	26-May-1990 (Note: resigned on 19-Mar-1990)	1
Ratan Tama	INC	27-May-1978	26-May-1984	1
