= Phosum Khimhun =

Indian politician (1959/1960 – 2024)

Member of Legislative Assembly
- In office 1999–2024
- Preceded by: Tengam Ngemu
- Succeeded by: Hamjong Tangha
- Constituency: Changlang South

Personal details
- Born: 1 April 1960 Khimyong
- Died: 9 March 2024 (aged 63) Itanagar
- Party: Bharatiya Janata Party
- Other political affiliations: Indian National Congress
- Occupation: Politician

Phosum Khimhun (1 April 1960 – 9 March 2024) was an Indian politician from the state of Arunachal Pradesh.

Khimhun was elected from Changlang South in the 2014 Arunachal Pradesh Legislative Assembly election, standing as a People's Party of Arunachal candidate. He was also elected as Pro Tempore Speaker of the Arunachal Pradesh Legislative Assembly

Khimhun was married to M. Khimhun and had two children. He died from a heart attack on 9 March 2024, at the age of 64. .

== See also ==
- Arunachal Pradesh Legislative Assembly
