= Tali Assembly constituency =

Legislative Assembly constituency in Arunachal Pradesh State, India

Coordinates: 28.03°N 93.75°E

Tali
- Constituency No. 20 for the Arunachal Pradesh Legislative Assembly

Constituency details
- Country: India
- Region: Northeast India
- State: Arunachal Pradesh
- District: Kra-Daadi
- Lok Sabha constituency: Arunachal West
- Established: 2008
- Total electors: 14,564
- Reservation: ST

Member of Legislative Assembly
- 11th Arunachal Pradesh Legislative Assembly
- Incumbent Jikke Tako
- Party: Bharatiya Janata Party

Tali is one of the 60 Legislative Assembly constituencies of Arunachal Pradesh state in India.

It is part of Kra Daadi district and is reserved for candidates belonging to the Scheduled Tribes. As of 2019, it is represented by Jikke Tako of the Bharatiya Janata Party.

== Members of the Legislative Assembly ==
Election	Member	Party
1990	Zara Tata	Janata Party
1995	Zara Tata	Indian National Congress
1999	Takam Sorang	Indian National Congress
2004	Takam Sorang	Indian National Congress
2009	Markio Tado	People's Party of Arunachal
2014	Markio Tado	Indian National Congress
2019	Jikke Tako	Janata Dal
2024	Jikke Tako	Bharatiya Janata Party

== Election results ==
=== Assembly Election 2024 ===
2024 Arunachal Pradesh Legislative Assembly election: Tali
Party	Candidate	Votes	%	±%
BJP	Jikke Tako	Unopposed		
Registered electors		14,564		▲10.98
BJP gain from JD(U)		Swing		

=== Assembly Election 2019 ===
2019 Arunachal Pradesh Legislative Assembly election : Tali
Party	Candidate	Votes	%	±%
JD(U)	Jikke Tako	5,518	50.33%	New
BJP	Thaji Gichak Kiogi	5,413	49.37%	New
NOTA	None of the Above	9	0.08%	▼0.04
Margin of victory		105	0.96%	▼8.36
Turnout		10,964	83.55%	▲8.87
Registered electors		13,123		▲12.36
JD(U) gain from INC		Swing	▼4.27	

=== Assembly Election 2014 ===
2014 Arunachal Pradesh Legislative Assembly election : Tali
Party	Candidate	Votes	%	±%
INC	Markio Tado	4,762	54.60%	▲21.97
NCP	Thaji Gichak Kiogi	3,949	45.28%	New
NOTA	None of the Above	11	0.13%	New
Margin of victory		813	9.32%	▼25.42
Turnout		8,722	74.68%	▼11.57
Registered electors		11,679		▲28.99
INC gain from PPA		Swing		

=== Assembly Election 2009 ===
2009 Arunachal Pradesh Legislative Assembly election : Tali
Party	Candidate	Votes	%	±%
PPA	Markio Tado	5,261	67.37%	New
INC	Takam Sorang	2,548	32.63%	▼21.77
Margin of victory		2,713	34.74%	▲25.95
Turnout		7,809	86.25%	▲18.63
Registered electors		9,054		▲5.56
PPA gain from INC		Swing		

=== Assembly Election 2004 ===
2004 Arunachal Pradesh Legislative Assembly election : Tali
Party	Candidate	Votes	%	±%
INC	Takam Sorang	3,155	54.40%	▼10.27
BJP	Gichak Thaji Kiogi	2,645	45.60%	New
Margin of victory		510	8.79%	▼21.60
Turnout		5,800	67.62%	▲2.82
Registered electors		8,577		▲23.13
INC hold		Swing		

=== Assembly Election 1999 ===
1999 Arunachal Pradesh Legislative Assembly election : Tali
Party	Candidate	Votes	%	±%
INC	Takam Sorang	2,919	64.67%	▲11.33
AC	Tarang Tagru	1,547	34.27%	New
NCP	Langpu Tallar	48	1.06%	New
Margin of victory		1,372	30.39%	▲19.88
Turnout		4,514	66.35%	▲3.18
Registered electors		6,966		▲4.93
INC hold		Swing		

=== Assembly Election 1995 ===
1995 Arunachal Pradesh Legislative Assembly election : Tali
Party	Candidate	Votes	%	±%
INC	Zara Tata	2,182	53.34%	▲22.71
Independent	Rigio Tache	1,752	42.83%	New
JD	Tagru Tana	142	3.47%	▼14.40
Margin of victory		430	10.51%	▼10.36
Turnout		4,091	63.23%	▲1.10
Registered electors		6,639		▼1.23
INC gain from JP		Swing		

=== Assembly Election 1990 ===
1990 Arunachal Pradesh Legislative Assembly election : Tali
Party	Candidate	Votes	%	±%
JP	Zara Tata	2,095	51.50%	New
INC	Sorom Tatup	1,246	30.63%	New
JD	Hari Taro	727	17.87%	New
Margin of victory		849	20.87%	
Turnout		4,068	61.71%	
Registered electors		6,722		
JP win (new seat)				

== See also ==
- List of constituencies of the Arunachal Pradesh Legislative Assembly
- Kra Daadi district
