= Roing Assembly constituency =

Legislative Assembly constituency in Arunachal Pradesh State, India

Coordinates: 28.12°N 95.82°E

Roing
- Constituency No. 43 for the Arunachal Pradesh Legislative Assembly

Constituency details
- Country: India
- Region: Northeast India
- State: Arunachal Pradesh
- District: Lower Dibang Valley
- Lok Sabha constituency: Arunachal East
- Established: 1978
- Total electors: 11,815
- Reservation: ST

Member of Legislative Assembly
- 11th Arunachal Pradesh Legislative Assembly
- Incumbent Mutchu Mithi
- Party: Bharatiya Janata Party

Roing is one of the 60 Legislative Assembly constituencies of Arunachal Pradesh state in India.

It is part of Lower Dibang Valley district and is reserved for candidates belonging to the Scheduled Tribes.

== Members of the Legislative Assembly ==
Election	Member	Party
1978	Aken Lego	People's Party of Arunachal
1980	Aken Lego	People's Party of Arunachal
1984	Mukut Mithi	Indian National Congress
1990	Mukut Mithi	Indian National Congress
1995	Mukut Mithi	Indian National Congress
1999	Mukut Mithi	Indian National Congress
2004	Mukut Mithi	Indian National Congress
2009	Laeta Umbrey	All India Trinamool Congress
2014	Mutchu Mithi	Indian National Congress
2019	Mutchu Mithi	National People's Party
2024	Mutchu Mithi	Bharatiya Janata Party

== Election results ==
=== Assembly Election 2024 ===
2024 Arunachal Pradesh Legislative Assembly election : Roing
Party	Candidate	Votes	%	±%
BJP	Mutchu Mithi	Unopposed		
Registered electors		11,815		▼3.46
BJP gain from NPP		Swing		

=== Assembly Election 2019 ===
2019 Arunachal Pradesh Legislative Assembly election : Roing
Party	Candidate	Votes	%	±%
NPP	Mutchu Mithi	4,950	50.54%	New
BJP	Laeta Umbrey	4,550	46.45%	▲37.10
INC	Etra Linggi	174	1.78%	▼54.37
NOTA	None of the Above	121	1.24%	▲0.30
Margin of victory		400	4.08%	▼18.49
Turnout		9,795	80.04%	▲0.53
Registered electors		12,238		▲0.53
NPP gain from INC		Swing	▼5.61	

=== Assembly Election 2014 ===
2014 Arunachal Pradesh Legislative Assembly election : Roing
Party	Candidate	Votes	%	±%
INC	Mutchu Mithi	5,434	56.14%	▲10.52
PPA	Laeta Umbrey	3,249	33.57%	New
BJP	Malo Linggi	905	9.35%	New
NOTA	None of the Above	91	0.94%	New
Margin of victory		2,185	22.57%	▲13.81
Turnout		9,679	79.51%	▼5.86
Registered electors		12,174		▲9.31
INC gain from AITC		Swing	▲1.76	

=== Assembly Election 2009 ===
2009 Arunachal Pradesh Legislative Assembly election : Roing
Party	Candidate	Votes	%	±%
AITC	Laeta Umbrey	5,170	54.38%	New
INC	Pomaya Mithi	4,337	45.62%	▼14.93
Margin of victory		833	8.76%	▼12.34
Turnout		9,507	85.36%	▲21.60
Registered electors		11,137		▲12.06
AITC gain from INC		Swing		

=== Assembly Election 2004 ===
2004 Arunachal Pradesh Legislative Assembly election : Roing
Party	Candidate	Votes	%	±%
INC	Mukut Mithi	3,837	60.55%	New
BJP	Laeta Umbrey	2,500	39.45%	New
Margin of victory		1,337	21.10%	
Turnout		6,337	62.09%	▲63.77
Registered electors		9,938		▼3.92
INC hold		Swing		

=== Assembly Election 1999 ===
1999 Arunachal Pradesh Legislative Assembly election : Roing
Party	Candidate	Votes	%	±%
INC	Mukut Mithi	Unopposed		
Registered electors		10,343		▲10.87
INC hold		Swing		

=== Assembly Election 1995 ===
1995 Arunachal Pradesh Legislative Assembly election : Roing
Party	Candidate	Votes	%	±%
INC	Mukut Mithi	4,258	58.55%	▼3.32
Independent	Akane Linggi	2,421	33.29%	New
Independent	Yirem Linggi	566	7.78%	New
Margin of victory		1,837	25.26%	▼3.29
Turnout		7,273	79.35%	▲8.21
Registered electors		9,329		▲6.46
INC hold		Swing		

=== Assembly Election 1990 ===
1990 Arunachal Pradesh Legislative Assembly election : Roing
Party	Candidate	Votes	%	±%
INC	Mukut Mithi	3,781	61.86%	▲14.97
JD	Namo Lingi	2,036	33.31%	New
Independent	Tangari Lingi	295	4.83%	New
Margin of victory		1,745	28.55%	▲16.22
Turnout		6,112	70.87%	▼2.17
Registered electors		8,763		▼2.24
INC hold		Swing		

=== Assembly Election 1984 ===
1984 Arunachal Pradesh Legislative Assembly election : Roing
Party	Candidate	Votes	%	±%
INC	Mukut Mithi	3,023	46.89%	New
PPA	Abom Bornag	2,228	34.56%	▼15.79
Independent	Namo Lingi	696	10.80%	New
Independent	Bidi Lego	500	7.76%	New
Margin of victory		795	12.33%	▼9.39
Turnout		6,447	75.69%	▼7.93
Registered electors		8,964		▲59.45
INC gain from PPA		Swing	▼3.46	

=== Assembly Election 1980 ===
1980 Arunachal Pradesh Legislative Assembly election : Roing
Party	Candidate	Votes	%	±%
PPA	Aken Lego	2,260	50.35%	▼9.75
Independent	Mukut Mithi	1,285	28.63%	New
INC(I)	Basu Perme	778	17.33%	New
Independent	Namo Lingi	166	3.70%	New
Margin of victory		975	21.72%	▼11.79
Turnout		4,489	85.86%	▲8.27
Registered electors		5,622		▲15.04
PPA hold		Swing	▼9.75	

=== Assembly Election 1978 ===
1978 Arunachal Pradesh Legislative Assembly election : Roing
Party	Candidate	Votes	%	±%
PPA	Aken Lego	2,102	60.09%	New
JP	Gora Partin	930	26.59%	New
Independent	Namo Lingi	466	13.32%	New
Margin of victory		1,172	33.50%	
Turnout		3,498	74.18%	
Registered electors		4,887		
PPA win (new seat)				

== See also ==
- List of constituencies of the Arunachal Pradesh Legislative Assembly
- Lower Dibang Valley district
