= T. L. Rajkumar =

Indian politician

T. L. Rajkumar is an Indian politician from the state of Arunachal Pradesh. Rajkumar was elected from Khonsa East constituency seat in the Arunachal Pradesh Legislative Assembly election in 1990, 1995 and 1999 standing as an Indian National Congress candidate. But he lost Khonsa East constituency seat in the 2014 Arunachal Pradesh Legislative Assembly election as a Bharatiya Janata Party candidate to Wanglam Sawin of People's Party of Arunachal.
