= Tezu Assembly constituency =

Legislative Assembly constituency in Arunachal Pradesh State, India

Coordinates: 27.93°N 96.15°E

Tezu
- Constituency No. 44 for the Arunachal Pradesh Legislative Assembly

Constituency details
- Country: India
- Region: Northeast India
- State: Arunachal Pradesh
- District: Lohit
- Lok Sabha constituency: Arunachal East
- Established: 1990
- Total electors: 20,761
- Reservation: ST

Member of Legislative Assembly
- 11th Arunachal Pradesh Legislative Assembly
- Incumbent Mohesh Chai
- Party: Bharatiya Janata Party

Tezu is one of the 60 Legislative Assembly constituencies of Arunachal Pradesh state in India.

It is part of Lohit district and is reserved for candidates belonging to the Scheduled Tribes. As of 2019, it is represented by Karikho Kri, an Independent politician.

== Members of the Legislative Assembly ==
Election	Member	Party
1990	Nakul Chai	Janata Dal
1995	Sobeng Tayang	Indian National Congress
1999	Nakul Chai	Indian National Congress
2004	Karikho Kri	Independent politician
2009	Karikho Kri	Indian National Congress
2014	Dr. Mahesh Chai	Bharatiya Janata Party
2019	Karikho Kri	Independent politician
2024	Dr. Mahesh Chai	Bharatiya Janata Party

== Election results ==
=== Assembly Election 2024 ===
2024 Arunachal Pradesh Legislative Assembly election : Tezu
Party	Candidate	Votes	%	±%
BJP	Dr. Mahesh Chai	8,535	51.70%	▲6.40
NPP	Karikho Kri	5,730	34.71%	New
Independent	Badang Tayang	1,716	10.39%	New
INC	Jeremai Krong	348	2.11%	▼4.57
NOTA	None of the Above	180	1.09%	▼0.69
Margin of victory		2,805	16.99%	▲16.04
Turnout		16,509	79.52%	▼6.79
Registered electors		20,761		▲9.93
BJP gain from Independent		Swing	▲5.45	

=== Assembly Election 2019 ===
2019 Arunachal Pradesh Legislative Assembly election : Tezu
Party	Candidate	Votes	%	±%
Independent	Karikho Kri	7,538	46.25%	New
BJP	Dr. Mahesh Chai	7,383	45.29%	▼5.69
INC	Nuney Tayang	1,088	6.67%	▼40.87
NOTA	None of the Above	291	1.79%	▲0.32
Margin of victory		155	0.95%	▼2.48
Turnout		16,300	86.31%	▲1.98
Registered electors		18,886		▲13.60
Independent gain from BJP		Swing	▼4.74	

=== Assembly Election 2014 ===
2014 Arunachal Pradesh Legislative Assembly election : Tezu
Party	Candidate	Votes	%	±%
BJP	Dr. Mahesh Chai	7,147	50.98%	New
INC	Karikho Kri	6,666	47.55%	▼17.30
NOTA	None of the Above	206	1.47%	New
Margin of victory		481	3.43%	▼26.26
Turnout		14,019	84.32%	▲1.58
Registered electors		16,625		▲6.24
BJP gain from INC		Swing		

=== Assembly Election 2009 ===
2009 Arunachal Pradesh Legislative Assembly election : Tezu
Party	Candidate	Votes	%	±%
INC	Karikho Kri	8,397	64.85%	▲29.73
AITC	Nakul Chai	4,552	35.15%	New
Margin of victory		3,845	29.69%	▲3.81
Turnout		12,949	82.75%	▲22.79
Registered electors		15,649		▲0.70
INC gain from Independent		Swing		

=== Assembly Election 2004 ===
2004 Arunachal Pradesh Legislative Assembly election : Tezu
Party	Candidate	Votes	%	±%
Independent	Karikho Kri	5,684	61.01%	New
INC	Nakul Chai	3,272	35.12%	▼2.46
BJP	Gofailum Kri	361	3.87%	New
Margin of victory		2,412	25.89%	▲23.35
Turnout		9,317	59.60%	▼5.22
Registered electors		15,540		▲14.89
Independent gain from INC		Swing		

=== Assembly Election 1999 ===
1999 Arunachal Pradesh Legislative Assembly election : Tezu
Party	Candidate	Votes	%	±%
INC	Nakul Chai	3,313	37.58%	▼17.55
Independent	Karikho Kri	3,089	35.04%	New
NCP	Khapriso Krong	1,242	14.09%	New
AC	Ojimso Tayang	981	11.13%	New
Independent	Johnum Manyu	191	2.17%	New
Margin of victory		224	2.54%	▼20.07
Turnout		8,816	67.58%	▼14.35
Registered electors		13,526		▲26.34
INC hold		Swing	▼17.55	

=== Assembly Election 1995 ===
1995 Arunachal Pradesh Legislative Assembly election : Tezu
Party	Candidate	Votes	%	±%
INC	Sobeng Tayang	4,694	55.13%	▲9.85
BJP	Sotai Kri	2,769	32.52%	New
JD	Nakul Chai	1,051	12.34%	▼40.50
Margin of victory		1,925	22.61%	▲15.05
Turnout		8,514	80.59%	▲12.98
Registered electors		10,706		▼2.21
INC gain from JD		Swing		

=== Assembly Election 1990 ===
1990 Arunachal Pradesh Legislative Assembly election : Tezu
Party	Candidate	Votes	%	±%
JD	Nakul Chai	3,850	52.85%	New
INC	Sobeng Tayang	3,299	45.28%	New
Independent	Geso Chopei	136	1.87%	New
Margin of victory		551	7.56%	
Turnout		7,285	68.09%	
Registered electors		10,948		
JD win (new seat)				

== See also ==
- List of constituencies of the Arunachal Pradesh Legislative Assembly
- Lohit district
