= Bordumsa-Diyun Assembly constituency =

Constituency of the Arunachal Pradesh legislative assembly in India

Coordinates: 27°31′N 95°53′E

Bordumsa-Diyun
- Constituency No. 49 for the Arunachal Pradesh Legislative Assembly

Constituency details
- Country: India
- Region: Northeast India
- State: Arunachal Pradesh
- District: Changlang
- Lok Sabha constituency: Arunachal East
- Established: 1990
- Total electors: 22,943
- Reservation: None

Member of Legislative Assembly
- 11th Arunachal Pradesh Legislative Assembly
- Incumbent Nikh Kamin
- Party: NCP
- Alliance: NDA
- Elected year: 2024

Bordumsa–Diyun is one of the 60 constituencies of Legislative Assembly of Arunachal Pradesh and also the only unreserved constituency in the State's Vidhan Sabha. The current MLA of this constituency is Nikh Kamin. Bordumsa–Diyun is one of the relatively new constituencies in Arunachal Pradesh, covering Diyun and Bordumsa administrative circles.The area is unique in its diversity, including indigenous Chakma, Singpho and Tangsa communities, along with a significant population of migrants from other parts of India.

== History ==
Bordumsa–Diyun was a part of the Naodihing–Nampong constituency from 1975 until 1987. After 1987, due to political and demographic changes, it gained more localized representation through restructuring, ultimately leading to its establishment as a separate constituency. This allowed it to address its unique needs and better represent the diverse communities in Diyun and Bordumsa.

Bordumsa and Diyun are towns in the Indian state of Arunachal Pradesh. Changlang is the name of the district that contains Bordumsa and Diyun towns. Bordumsa and Diyun are revenue circles and together constitute form the constituency.

== Members of the Legislative Assembly ==
Vidhan Sabha	Election	Portrait	Name	Party	Tenure
4th	1990		C. C. Singpho	Indian National Congress	1990–2014
5th	1995		C. C. Singpho	Indian National Congress	1990–2014
6th	1999		C. C. Singpho	Indian National Congress	1990–2014
7th	2004		C. C. Singpho	Indian National Congress	1990–2014
8th	2009		C. C. Singpho	Indian National Congress	1990–2014
9th	2014		Nikh Kamin	People's Party of Arunachal	2014–2019
10th	2019		Somlung Mossang	Independent politician	2019–2024
11th	2024		Nikh Kamin	Nationalist Congress Party	2024–Incumbent

== Election results ==
Vote share winning candidates
2024	51.04%
2019	39.01%
2014	41.58%
2009	48.84%
2004	40.63%
1999	33.64%
1995	51.03%
1990	43.68%

=== Assembly Election 2024 ===
The 11th Assembly Election of Arunachal Pradesh was conducted on 19 April 2024 and the result was declared on 2 June 2024 in which Nikh Kamin of Nationalist Congress Party came out as the front runner and will be representing 49th Bordumsa-Diyun Constituency at the state Assembly.

2024 Arunachal Pradesh Legislative Assembly election: Bordumsa-Diyun
Party	Candidate	Votes	%	±%
NCP	Nikh Kamin	10,497	51.04%	New
BJP	Somlung Mossang	9,145	44.46%	▲20.12
PPA	Biri Joy	364	1.77%	▲0.69
Independent	Upen Chandra Deori	222	1.08%	New
NOTA	None of the Above	200	0.97%	▼0.02
Arunachal Democratic Party	Madan Tanti	139	0.68%	New
Margin of victory		1,352	6.57%	▼8.09
Turnout		20,567	89.64%	▲1.97
Registered electors		22,943		▲23.96
NCP gain from Independent		Swing	▲12.03	

=== Assembly Election 2019 ===
2019 Arunachal Pradesh Legislative Assembly election: Bordumsa-Diyun
Party	Candidate	Votes	%	±%
Independent	Somlung Mossang	6,330	39.01%	New
BJP	Jawra Maio	3,951	24.35%	▲16.77
NPP	Nikh Kamin	3,783	23.31%	New
JD(U)	Dana Takio	931	5.74%	New
INC	Joseph Kishan	328	2.02%	▼29.16
All Indians Party	Upen Chandra Deori	232	1.43%	New
PPA	Sijen Thakkho	175	1.08%	▼40.50
NOTA	None of the Above	161	0.99%	New
JD(S)	Pike Pulu	123	0.76%	New
Independent	Bidya Sankar Prasad	112	0.69%	New
Independent	Yari Tok	102	0.63%	New
Margin of victory		2,379	14.66%	▲4.26
Turnout		16,228	87.68%	▲3.52
Registered electors		18,509		▲21.99
Independent gain from PPA		Swing	▼2.57	

=== Assembly Election 2014 ===
2014 Arunachal Pradesh Legislative Assembly election: Bordumsa-Diyun
Party	Candidate	Votes	%	±%
PPA	Nikh Kamin	5,309	41.58%	New
INC	C. C. Singpho	3,981	31.18%	▼17.66
NCP	Mayong Maio	2,363	18.51%	▼22.80
BJP	Siraiong Singpho	967	7.57%	▼2.28
NOTA	None of the Above	148	1.16%	New
Margin of victory		1,328	10.40%	▲2.87
Turnout		12,768	84.16%	▲2.88
Registered electors		15,172		▼2.76
PPA gain from INC		Swing	▼7.26	

=== Assembly Election 2009 ===
2009 Arunachal Pradesh Legislative Assembly election: Bordumsa-Diyun
Party	Candidate	Votes	%	±%
INC	C. C. Singpho	6,193	48.84%	▲8.21
NCP	Khumral Lungphi	5,238	41.31%	▲38.36
BJP	Siraiong Singpho	1,250	9.86%	New
Margin of victory		955	7.53%	▲1.74
Turnout		12,681	81.27%	▲6.89
Registered electors		15,603		▲23.58
INC hold		Swing		

=== Assembly Election 2004 ===
2004 Arunachal Pradesh Legislative Assembly election: Bordumsa-Diyun
Party	Candidate	Votes	%	±%
INC	C. C. Singpho	3,816	40.63%	▲6.99
Independent	Mayong Maio	3,272	34.84%	New
Independent	Lajala Singpho	2,027	21.58%	New
NCP	Umbontang Singpho	277	2.95%	New
Margin of victory		544	5.79%	▼0.05
Turnout		9,392	73.36%	▼2.26
Registered electors		12,626		▲25.02
INC hold		Swing	▲6.99	

=== Assembly Election 1999 ===
1999 Arunachal Pradesh Legislative Assembly election: Bordumsa-Diyun
Party	Candidate	Votes	%	±%
INC	C. C. Singpho	2,604	33.64%	▼17.39
Independent	Khumral Lungphi	2,152	27.80%	New
BJP	Siongam Singpho	1,549	20.01%	New
Independent	Singdu Nong Singpho	1,325	17.12%	New
AC	Chowseng Mong Singpho	110	1.42%	New
Margin of victory		452	5.84%	▼11.13
Turnout		7,740	79.92%	▼8.73
Registered electors		10,099		▲15.44
INC hold		Swing	▼17.39	

=== Assembly Election 1995 ===
1995 Arunachal Pradesh Legislative Assembly election: Bordumsa-Diyun
Party	Candidate	Votes	%	±%
INC	C. C. Singpho	3,811	51.03%	▲7.35
Independent	Singdu Nong Singpho	2,544	34.07%	New
Independent	Innaola Ong Singpho	823	11.02%	New
Independent	Sikhet Nong	290	3.88%	New
Margin of victory		1,267	16.97%	▲1.92
Turnout		7,468	87.62%	▲10.73
Registered electors		8,748		▲14.08
INC hold		Swing	▲7.35	

=== Assembly Election 1990 ===
1990 Arunachal Pradesh Legislative Assembly election: Bordumsa-Diyun
Party	Candidate	Votes	%	±%
INC	C. C. Singpho	2,500	43.68%	New
JD	Innem Gam Singpho	1,639	28.64%	New
Independent	Sinai Wangno	1,584	27.68%	New
Margin of victory		861	15.04%	
Turnout		5,723	77.39%	
Registered electors		7,668		
INC win (new seat)				

== See also ==
- List of constituencies of Arunachal Pradesh Legislative Assembly
- Arunachal Pradesh Legislative Assembly
