= Anini Assembly constituency =

Legislative Assembly constituency in Arunachal Pradesh State, India

Coordinates: 28.8°N 95.9°E

Anini
- Constituency No. 41 for the Arunachal Pradesh Legislative Assembly

Constituency details
- Country: India
- Region: Northeast India
- State: Arunachal Pradesh
- District: Dibang Valley
- Lok Sabha constituency: Arunachal East
- Established: 1980
- Total electors: 4,747
- Reservation: ST

Member of Legislative Assembly
- 11th Arunachal Pradesh Legislative Assembly
- Incumbent Mopi Mihu
- Party: Bharatiya Janata Party

Anini is one of the 60 Legislative Assembly constituencies of Arunachal Pradesh state in India.

It comprises the Anini, Etalin, Anelih and Kronli circles, all in Dibang Valley district, and is reserved for candidates belonging to the Scheduled Tribes.

== Members of the Legislative Assembly ==
Election	Member	Party
1980	Tade Tacho	Independent
1984	Rajesh Tacho	Indian National Congress
1990	Rajesh Tacho	Indian National Congress
1995	Tade Tacho	Indian National Congress
1999	Rajesh Tacho	Indian National Congress
2004	Rajesh Tacho	Indian National Congress
2009	Rajesh Tacho	Indian National Congress
2014	Rajesh Tacho	Indian National Congress
2019	Mopi Mihu	Bharatiya Janata Party
2024	Mopi Mihu	Bharatiya Janata Party

== Election results ==
=== 2024 ===
2024 Arunachal Pradesh Legislative Assembly election: Anini
Party	Candidate	Votes	%	±%
BJP	Mopi Mihu	2,711	63.62%	▼0.91
Independent	Eri Tayu	1,538	36.09%	New
NOTA	None of the Above	12	0.28%	▼0.95
Margin of victory		1,173	27.53%	▼2.76
Turnout		4,261	89.76%	▲2.43
Registered electors		4,747		▲10.73
BJP hold		Swing	▼0.91	

=== 2019 ===
2019 Arunachal Pradesh Legislative Assembly election: Anini
Party	Candidate	Votes	%	±%
BJP	Mopi Mihu	2,416	64.53%	▲17.76
INC	Singe Milli	1,282	34.24%	▼18.02
NOTA	None of the Above	46	1.23%	New
Margin of victory		1,134	30.29%	▲24.80
Turnout		3,744	87.33%	▲1.11
Registered electors		4,287		▲5.62
BJP gain from INC		Swing	▲12.27	

=== 2014 ===
2014 Arunachal Pradesh Legislative Assembly election: Anini
Party	Candidate	Votes	%	±%
INC	Rajesh Tacho	1,829	52.26%	▲1.06
BJP	Eri Tayu	1,637	46.77%	New
NOTA	None of the Above	34	0.97%	New
Margin of victory		192	5.49%	▲3.09
Turnout		3,500	86.23%	▼4.17
Registered electors		4,059		▲8.59
INC hold		Swing		

=== 2009 ===
2009 Arunachal Pradesh Legislative Assembly election: Anini
Party	Candidate	Votes	%	±%
INC	Rajesh Tacho	1,730	51.20%	▲9.63
NCP	Eri Tayu	1,649	48.80%	New
Margin of victory		81	2.40%	▼6.16
Turnout		3,379	90.40%	▲26.32
Registered electors		3,738		▼21.16
INC hold		Swing		

=== 2004 ===
2004 Arunachal Pradesh Legislative Assembly election: Anini
Party	Candidate	Votes	%	±%
INC	Rajesh Tacho	1,263	41.57%	New
AC	Paro Molo	1,003	33.02%	New
BJP	Tasku Tayu	772	25.41%	New
Margin of victory		260	8.56%	
Turnout		3,038	64.06%	▲64.08
Registered electors		4,741		▲27.79
INC hold		Swing		

=== 1999 ===
1999 Arunachal Pradesh Legislative Assembly election: Anini
Party	Candidate	Votes	%	±%
INC	Rajesh Tacho	Unopposed		
Registered electors		3,710		▼0.27
INC hold		Swing		

=== 1995 ===
1995 Arunachal Pradesh Legislative Assembly election: Anini
Party	Candidate	Votes	%	±%
INC	Tade Tacho	1,274	42.13%	▲5.51
JD	Rajesh Tacho	1,215	40.18%	New
Independent	Paha Mimi	535	17.69%	New
Margin of victory		59	1.95%	▼3.11
Turnout		3,024	82.34%	▲9.91
Registered electors		3,720		▲0.24
INC hold		Swing		

=== 1990 ===
1990 Arunachal Pradesh Legislative Assembly election: Anini
Party	Candidate	Votes	%	±%
INC	Rajesh Tacho	970	36.62%	▼15.84
Independent	Tade Tacho	836	31.56%	New
Independent	Maru Mili	470	17.74%	New
Independent	Toloka Mihu	373	14.08%	New
Margin of victory		134	5.06%	▼16.28
Turnout		2,649	73.08%	▲15.18
Registered electors		3,711		▼16.04
INC hold		Swing	▼15.84	

=== 1984 ===
1984 Arunachal Pradesh Legislative Assembly election: Anini
Party	Candidate	Votes	%	±%
INC	Tade Tacho	1,303	52.46%	New
Independent	Maru Mili	773	31.12%	New
Independent	Buli Tacho	329	13.24%	New
Independent	Dature Miuli	79	3.18%	New
Margin of victory		530	21.34%	▼3.48
Turnout		2,484	61.45%	▲11.18
Registered electors		4,420		▲5.51
INC gain from Independent		Swing	▼9.95	

=== 1980 ===
1980 Arunachal Pradesh Legislative Assembly election: Anini
Party	Candidate	Votes	%	±%
Independent	Tade Tacho	1,177	62.41%	New
Independent	Ita Pulu	709	37.59%	New
Margin of victory		468	24.81%	
Turnout		1,886	47.53%	
Registered electors		4,189		
Independent win (new seat)				

== See also ==
- List of constituencies of the Arunachal Pradesh Legislative Assembly
- Dibang Valley district
