= Khonsa East Assembly constituency =

Constituency of the Arunachal Pradesh legislative assembly in India

Coordinates: 26.993°N 95.512°E

Khonsa East
- Constituency No. 55 for the Arunachal Pradesh Legislative Assembly

Constituency details
- Country: India
- Region: Northeast India
- State: Arunachal Pradesh
- District: Tirap
- Lok Sabha constituency: Arunachal East
- Established: 1990
- Total electors: 10,142
- Reservation: ST

Member of Legislative Assembly
- 11th Arunachal Pradesh Legislative Assembly
- Incumbent Wanglam Sawin
- Party: Independent
- Elected year: 2024

Khonsa East is one of the 60 assembly constituencies of Arunachal Pradesh, a northeastern state of India. It is part of Arunachal East Lok Sabha constituency.

== Members of the Legislative Assembly ==
Election	Member	Party
1990	T. L. Rajkumar	Indian National Congress
1995	T. L. Rajkumar	Indian National Congress
1999	T. L. Rajkumar	Indian National Congress
2004	Kamthok Lowang	Independent politician
2009	Kamthok Lowang	All India Trinamool Congress
2014	Wanglam Sawin	People's Party of Arunachal
2019	Wanglam Sawin	Bharatiya Janata Party
2024	Wanglam Sawin	Independent politician

== Election results ==
=== 1990 Assembly Election ===
1990 Arunachal Pradesh Legislative Assembly election: Khonsa East
Party	Candidate	Votes	%	±%
INC	T. L. Rajkumar	3,245	64.13%	New
JD	Tonhangtongluk	1,815	35.87%	New
Margin of victory		1,430	28.26%	
Turnout		5,060	71.35%	
Registered electors		7,330		
INC win (new seat)				

=== 1995 Assembly Election ===
1995 Arunachal Pradesh Legislative Assembly election: Khonsa East
Party	Candidate	Votes	%	±%
INC	T. L. Rajkumar	3,062	49.93%	▼14.20
Independent	Kamthok Lowang	3,033	49.45%	New
Independent	Wentan Phuksa	38	0.62%	New
Margin of victory		29	0.47%	▼27.79
Turnout		6,133	82.81%	▲11.84
Registered electors		7,584		▲3.47
INC hold		Swing		

=== 1999 Assembly Election ===
1999 Arunachal Pradesh Legislative Assembly election: Khonsa East
Party	Candidate	Votes	%	±%
INC	T. L. Rajkumar	Unopposed		
Registered electors		8,289		▲9.30
INC hold		Swing		

=== 2004 Assembly Election ===
2004 Arunachal Pradesh Legislative Assembly election: Khonsa East
Party	Candidate	Votes	%	±%
Independent	Kamthok Lowang	4,459	77.98%	New
AC	Chopnei Chimyang	1,060	18.54%	New
INC	T. L. Rajkumar	199	3.48%	New
Margin of victory		3,399	59.44%	
Turnout		5,718	62.00%	▲63.43
Registered electors		9,014		▲8.75
Independent gain from INC		Swing		

=== 2009 Assembly Election ===
2009 Arunachal Pradesh Legislative Assembly election: Khonsa East
Party	Candidate	Votes	%	±%
AITC	Kamthok Lowang	3,475	45.38%	New
INC	T. L. Rajkumar	3,020	39.44%	▲35.96
PPA	Ngampay Lamaty	721	9.41%	New
BJP	Wangman Lowangcha	442	5.77%	New
Margin of victory		455	5.94%	▼53.50
Turnout		7,658	73.92%	▲10.48
Registered electors		10,360		▲14.93
AITC gain from Independent		Swing	▼32.60	

=== 2014 Assembly Election ===
2014 Arunachal Pradesh Legislative Assembly election: Khonsa East
Party	Candidate	Votes	%	±%
PPA	Wanglam Sawin	3,169	42.38%	▲32.96
BJP	T. L. Rajkumar	2,292	30.65%	▲24.88
INC	Kamthok Lowang	1,911	25.55%	▼13.88
NOTA	None of the Above	106	1.42%	New
Margin of victory		877	11.73%	▲5.79
Turnout		7,478	72.72%	▼1.20
Registered electors		10,283		▼0.74
PPA gain from AITC		Swing	▼3.00	

=== 2019 Assembly Election ===
2019 Arunachal Pradesh Legislative Assembly election: Khonsa East
Party	Candidate	Votes	%	±%
BJP	Wanglam Sawin	5,051	67.65%	▲37.00
NPP	Danhang Phuksa	1,670	22.37%	New
JD(S)	Wangman Lowangcha	703	9.42%	New
NOTA	None of the Above	42	0.56%	▼0.85
Margin of victory		3,381	45.29%	▲33.56
Turnout		7,466	79.11%	▲6.38
Registered electors		9,438		▼8.22
BJP gain from PPA		Swing	▲25.28	

=== 2024 Assembly Election ===
2024 Arunachal Pradesh Legislative Assembly election: Khonsa East
Party	Candidate	Votes	%	±%
Independent	Wanglam Sawin	4,544	55.82%	New
BJP	Kamrang Tesia	2,328	28.60%	▼39.06
NPP	Nokju Wanghop	1,229	15.10%	▼7.27
NOTA	None of the Above	40	0.49%	▼0.07
Margin of victory		2,216	27.22%	▼18.07
Turnout		8,141	80.27%	▲1.16
Registered electors		10,142		▲7.46
Independent gain from BJP		Swing	▼11.84	

== See also ==
- Khonsa
- Tirap district
- List of constituencies of Arunachal Pradesh Legislative Assembly
