= Lekang Assembly constituency =

Legislative Assembly constituency in Arunachal Pradesh State, India

Coordinates: 27.65°N 95.94°E

Lekang
- Constituency No. 48 for the Arunachal Pradesh Legislative Assembly

Constituency details
- Country: India
- Region: Northeast India
- State: Arunachal Pradesh
- District: Namsai
- Lok Sabha constituency: Arunachal East
- Established: 1990
- Total electors: 20,864
- Reservation: ST

Member of Legislative Assembly
- 11th Arunachal Pradesh Legislative Assembly
- Incumbent Likha Soni
- Party: NCP
- Alliance: NDA
- Elected year: 2024

Lekang is one of the 60 Legislative Assembly constituencies of Arunachal Pradesh state in India.

It is part of Namsai district and is reserved for candidates belonging to the Scheduled Tribes.

== Members of the Legislative Assembly ==
Election	Name	Party
1990	Omem Moyong Deori	Indian National Congress
1995	Chowna Mein	Janata Dal
1999	Chowna Mein	Indian National Congress
2004	Chowna Mein	Indian National Congress
2009	Chowna Mein	Indian National Congress
2014	Chowna Mein	Indian National Congress
2019	Jummum Ete Deori	Bharatiya Janata Party
2024	Likha Soni	Nationalist Congress Party

== Election results ==
=== Assembly Election 2024 ===
2024 Arunachal Pradesh Legislative Assembly election : Lekang
Party	Candidate	Votes	%	±%
NCP	Likha Soni	7,804	45.28%	New
BJP	Chow Sujana Namchoom	7,150	41.49%	▼14.72
INC	Tana Tamar Tara	1,122	6.51%	▼15.32
Arunachal Democratic Party	Haren Tali	690	4.00%	New
NOTA	None of the Above	289	1.68%	▲0.09
Independent	Moneswar Danggen	180	1.04%	New
Margin of victory		654	3.79%	▼30.59
Turnout		17,235	82.61%	▼3.65
Registered electors		20,864		▲12.64
NCP gain from BJP		Swing	▼10.93	

=== Assembly Election 2019 ===
2019 Arunachal Pradesh Legislative Assembly election : Lekang
Party	Candidate	Votes	%	±%
BJP	Jummum Ete Deori	8,980	56.21%	▲46.53
INC	Takam Sanjoy	3,487	21.83%	▼25.64
Independent	Bida Taku	988	6.18%	New
NPP	Nikh Khopi	845	5.29%	New
JD(U)	Padmeswari Jamoh	575	3.60%	New
JD(S)	Takam Paleng	428	2.68%	New
Independent	Nabam Tekhi	420	2.63%	New
NOTA	None of the Above	253	1.58%	▲0.55
Margin of victory		5,493	34.38%	▲25.55
Turnout		15,976	86.25%	▼2.11
Registered electors		18,522		▲22.59
BJP gain from INC		Swing	▲8.74	

=== Assembly Election 2014 ===
2014 Arunachal Pradesh Legislative Assembly election : Lekang
Party	Candidate	Votes	%	±%
INC	Chowna Mein	6,337	47.46%	▼9.51
PPA	Bida Taku	5,158	38.63%	New
BJP	Tape Bagra	1,292	9.68%	▲3.85
NPF	Pike Pulu	236	1.77%	New
Independent	Anita Payeng	190	1.42%	New
NOTA	None of the Above	138	1.03%	New
Margin of victory		1,179	8.83%	▼15.51
Turnout		13,351	88.36%	▲4.26
Registered electors		15,109		▲4.99
INC hold		Swing	▼9.51	

=== Assembly Election 2009 ===
2009 Arunachal Pradesh Legislative Assembly election : Lekang
Party	Candidate	Votes	%	±%
INC	Chowna Mein	6,896	56.97%	▲4.88
NCP	James Techi Tara	3,950	32.63%	▲29.83
BJP	Sotai Kri	705	5.82%	▼9.09
Independent	Koruna Morang	305	2.52%	New
AITC	Larbin Nasi	248	2.05%	New
Margin of victory		2,946	24.34%	▼6.55
Turnout		12,104	84.11%	▲11.72
Registered electors		14,391		▲6.60
INC hold		Swing	▲4.88	

=== Assembly Election 2004 ===
2004 Arunachal Pradesh Legislative Assembly election : Lekang
Party	Candidate	Votes	%	±%
INC	Chowna Mein	5,091	52.10%	▼1.58
Independent	Chow Naching Loongchot	2,073	21.21%	New
BJP	Sotai Kri	1,457	14.91%	▼31.41
Independent	Chow Mithila Maunglang	877	8.97%	New
NCP	Chau Pinkkham Munglang	274	2.80%	New
Margin of victory		3,018	30.88%	▲23.52
Turnout		9,772	72.36%	▼7.76
Registered electors		13,500		▲5.95
INC hold		Swing	▼1.58	

=== Assembly Election 1999 ===
1999 Arunachal Pradesh Legislative Assembly election : Lekang
Party	Candidate	Votes	%	±%
INC	Chowna Mein	5,482	53.68%	▲13.80
BJP	Sotai Kri	4,730	46.32%	New
Margin of victory		752	7.36%	▼12.87
Turnout		10,212	82.40%	▼9.74
Registered electors		12,742		▲16.44
INC gain from JD		Swing		

=== Assembly Election 1995 ===
1995 Arunachal Pradesh Legislative Assembly election : Lekang
Party	Candidate	Votes	%	±%
JD	Chowna Mein	5,913	60.12%	▲11.22
INC	Omem Moyong Deori	3,923	39.88%	▼11.22
Margin of victory		1,990	20.23%	▲18.03
Turnout		9,836	91.88%	▲4.03
Registered electors		10,943		▲14.96
JD gain from INC		Swing		

=== Assembly Election 1990 ===
1990 Arunachal Pradesh Legislative Assembly election : Lekang
Party	Candidate	Votes	%	±%
INC	Omem Moyong Deori	4,176	51.10%	New
JD	Chowna Mein	3,996	48.90%	New
Margin of victory		180	2.20%	
Turnout		8,172	87.39%	
Registered electors		9,519		
INC win (new seat)				

== See also ==
- List of constituencies of the Arunachal Pradesh Legislative Assembly
- Namsai district
