= Bakin =

Bakin may refer to:

- State Intelligence Agency (Indonesia), formerly Bakin
- Takizawa Bakin (1767–1848), or Kyokutei Bakin, Japanese author
- Bakin Pertin (1942–1996), Indian politician
