= Nari-Koyu Assembly constituency =

Legislative Assembly constituency in Arunachal Pradesh state, India

Coordinates: 27.800°N 95.045°E

Nari-Koyu
- Constituency No. 36 for the Arunachal Pradesh Legislative Assembly

Constituency details
- Country: India
- Region: Northeast India
- State: Arunachal Pradesh
- District: Lower Siang
- Lok Sabha constituency: Arunachal East
- Established: 1990
- Total electors: 8,220
- Reservation: ST

Member of Legislative Assembly
- 11th Arunachal Pradesh Legislative Assembly
- Incumbent Tojir Kadu
- Party: Bharatiya Janata Party
- Elected year: 2024

Nari-Koyu is one of the 60 Legislative Assembly constituencies of Arunachal Pradesh state in India. It is in Lower Siang district and is reserved for candidates belonging to the Scheduled Tribes.

== Member of Legislative Assembly ==
Year	Member	Party
1990	Tako Eabi	Janata Dal
1995	Tako Dabi	Indian National Congress
1999	Tako Dabi	Indian National Congress
2004	Tako Dabi	Indian National Congress
2009	Tako Dabi	Indian National Congress
2014	Kento Rina	Bharatiya Janata Party
2019	Kento Rina	Bharatiya Janata Party
2024	Tojir Kadu	Bharatiya Janata Party

== Election results ==
=== Assembly Election 2024 ===
2024 Arunachal Pradesh Legislative Assembly election : Nari-Koyu
Party	Candidate	Votes	%	±%
BJP	Tojir Kadu	4,545	60.59%	▲23.32
Arunachal Democratic Party	Gegong Apang	2,896	38.61%	New
NOTA	None of the Above	60	0.80%	▲0.28
Margin of victory		1,649	21.98%	▲18.75
Turnout		7,501	91.25%	▲2.64
Registered electors		8,220		▲9.08
BJP hold		Swing	▲23.32	

=== Assembly Election 2019 ===
2019 Arunachal Pradesh Legislative Assembly election : Nari-Koyu
Party	Candidate	Votes	%	±%
BJP	Kento Rina	2,489	37.27%	▼15.62
INC	Tojir Kadu	2,273	34.04%	▼12.55
NPP	Karto Kaye	1,881	28.17%	New
NOTA	None of the Above	35	0.52%	▲0.01
Margin of victory		216	3.23%	▼3.07
Turnout		6,678	88.61%	▼0.07
Registered electors		7,536		▲8.31
BJP hold		Swing	▼15.62	

=== Assembly Election 2014 ===
2014 Arunachal Pradesh Legislative Assembly election : Nari-Koyu
Party	Candidate	Votes	%	±%
BJP	Kento Rina	3,264	52.89%	New
INC	Tako Dabi	2,875	46.59%	▼9.54
NOTA	None of the Above	32	0.52%	New
Margin of victory		389	6.30%	▼5.95
Turnout		6,171	88.69%	▲0.36
Registered electors		6,958		▲1.52
BJP gain from INC		Swing		

=== Assembly Election 2009 ===
2009 Arunachal Pradesh Legislative Assembly election : Nari-Koyu
Party	Candidate	Votes	%	±%
INC	Tako Dabi	3,398	56.13%	▲15.94
NCP	Kenyir Ringu	2,656	43.87%	New
Margin of victory		742	12.26%	▲7.87
Turnout		6,054	88.33%	▲5.64
Registered electors		6,854		▲15.66
INC hold		Swing		

=== Assembly Election 2004 ===
2004 Arunachal Pradesh Legislative Assembly election : Nari-Koyu
Party	Candidate	Votes	%	±%
INC	Tako Dabi	1,969	40.18%	▼27.82
Independent	Karto Kaye	1,754	35.80%	New
AC	Tanya Dabi	923	18.84%	▼13.03
BJP	Kojum Koyu	254	5.18%	New
Margin of victory		215	4.39%	▼31.75
Turnout		4,900	80.76%	▲2.57
Registered electors		5,926		▲7.82
INC hold		Swing	▼27.82	

=== Assembly Election 1999 ===
1999 Arunachal Pradesh Legislative Assembly election : Nari-Koyu
Party	Candidate	Votes	%	±%
INC	Tako Dabi	2,994	68.00%	▲18.14
AC	Tajum Ringu	1,403	31.86%	New
Margin of victory		1,591	36.13%	▲30.48
Turnout		4,403	81.26%	▼6.15
Registered electors		5,496		▲21.40
INC hold		Swing		

=== Assembly Election 1995 ===
1995 Arunachal Pradesh Legislative Assembly election : Nari-Koyu
Party	Candidate	Votes	%	±%
INC	Tako Dabi	1,947	49.86%	▼0.04
Independent	Tanya Dabi	1,726	44.20%	New
Independent	Yomri Riba	215	5.51%	New
Margin of victory		221	5.66%	▲5.45
Turnout		3,905	86.92%	▲3.73
Registered electors		4,527		▲28.21
INC gain from JD		Swing		

=== Assembly Election 1990 ===
1990 Arunachal Pradesh Legislative Assembly election : Nari-Koyu
Party	Candidate	Votes	%	±%
JD	Tako Eabi	1,460	50.10%	New
INC	Tanya Dabi	1,454	49.90%	New
Margin of victory		6	0.21%	
Turnout		2,914	83.12%	
Registered electors		3,531		
JD win (new seat)				

== See also ==
- List of constituencies of Arunachal Pradesh Legislative Assembly
- Lower Siang district
