= Tuting–Yingkiong Assembly constituency =

Legislative Assembly constituency in Arunachal Pradesh, India

Coordinates: 28.994°N 94.892°E

Tuting-Yingkiong
- Constituency No. 34 for the Arunachal Pradesh Legislative Assembly

Constituency details
- Country: India
- Region: Northeast India
- State: Arunachal Pradesh
- District: Upper Siang
- Lok Sabha constituency: Arunachal East
- Established: 2008
- Total electors: 13,169
- Reservation: ST

Member of Legislative Assembly
- 11th Arunachal Pradesh Legislative Assembly
- Incumbent Alo Libang
- Party: Bharatiya Janata Party
- Elected year: 2024

Tuting-Yingkiong is one of the 60 constituencies in the Arunachal Pradesh Legislative Assembly in India. The MLA as of 2019 is Alo Libang.

Tuting and Yingkiong are village and administrative town headquarters respectively of Upper Siang in the Indian state of Arunachal Pradesh. Upper Siang is the name of the district where the village Tuting and Yingkiong Town are located. The village was recently in spotlight due to Chinese People's Liberation Army incursion and construction of roads inside Indian territory. The village is under the administrative control of an additional deputy commissioner.

== Members of the Legislative Assembly ==
Election	Member	Party
1990	Gegong Apang	Indian National Congress
1995	Gegong Apang	Indian National Congress
1999	Gegong Apang	Arunachal Congress
2004	Gegong Apang	Indian National Congress
2009	Alo Libang	Nationalist Congress Party
2014	Alo Libang	Indian National Congress
2019	Alo Libang	Bharatiya Janata Party
2024	Alo Libang	Bharatiya Janata Party

== Election results ==
=== Assembly Election 2024 ===
2024 Arunachal Pradesh Legislative Assembly election : Tuting–Yingkiong
Party	Candidate	Votes	%	±%
BJP	Alo Libang	6,095	53.76%	▼2.18
PPA	Nobeng Burang	5,180	45.69%	▲42.52
NOTA	None of the Above	63	0.56%	▲0.08
Margin of victory		915	8.07%	▼7.45
Turnout		11,338	86.10%	▲1.56
Registered electors		13,169		▲7.37
BJP hold		Swing	▼2.18	

=== Assembly Election 2019 ===
2019 Arunachal Pradesh Legislative Assembly election : Tuting–Yingkiong
Party	Candidate	Votes	%	±%
BJP	Alo Libang	5,800	55.94%	▲8.29
JD(S)	Gegong Apang	4,191	40.42%	New
PPA	Tsepa Wangchuk Khamba	328	3.16%	New
NOTA	None of the Above	49	0.47%	▼0.35
Margin of victory		1,609	15.52%	▲11.64
Turnout		10,368	84.53%	▲1.80
Registered electors		12,265		▲8.17
BJP gain from INC		Swing	▲4.41	

=== Assembly Election 2014 ===
2014 Arunachal Pradesh Legislative Assembly election : Tuting–Yingkiong
Party	Candidate	Votes	%	±%
INC	Alo Libang	4,834	51.53%	▲13.20
BJP	Gegong Apang	4,470	47.65%	▲39.50
NOTA	None of the Above	77	0.82%	New
Margin of victory		364	3.88%	▼11.31
Turnout		9,381	82.73%	▼1.46
Registered electors		11,339		▲5.85
INC gain from NCP		Swing		

=== Assembly Election 2009 ===
2009 Arunachal Pradesh Legislative Assembly election : Tuting–Yingkiong
Party	Candidate	Votes	%	±%
NCP	Alo Libang	4,827	53.52%	New
INC	Gegong Apang	3,457	38.33%	▼40.84
BJP	Katan Komboh	735	8.15%	▼12.68
Margin of victory		1,370	15.19%	▼43.15
Turnout		9,019	84.20%	▲12.42
Registered electors		10,712		▼3.16
NCP gain from INC		Swing		

=== Assembly Election 2004 ===
2004 Arunachal Pradesh Legislative Assembly election : Tuting–Yingkiong
Party	Candidate	Votes	%	±%
INC	Gegong Apang	6,286	79.17%	▲39.82
BJP	Ojing Komboh	1,654	20.83%	New
Margin of victory		4,632	58.34%	▲37.03
Turnout		7,940	67.59%	▲0.89
Registered electors		11,062		▲3.61
INC gain from AC		Swing		

=== Assembly Election 1999 ===
1999 Arunachal Pradesh Legislative Assembly election : Tuting–Yingkiong
Party	Candidate	Votes	%	±%
AC	Gegong Apang	4,591	60.66%	New
INC	Anong Jongkey	2,978	39.34%	▼40.96
Margin of victory		1,613	21.31%	▼39.30
Turnout		7,569	72.87%	▼12.63
Registered electors		10,677		▲15.70
AC gain from INC		Swing		

=== Assembly Election 1995 ===
1995 Arunachal Pradesh Legislative Assembly election : Tuting–Yingkiong
Party	Candidate	Votes	%	±%
INC	Gegong Apang	6,189	80.30%	▼0.71
JD	Oteng Jongkey	1,518	19.70%	▲0.71
Margin of victory		4,671	60.61%	▼1.43
Turnout		7,707	85.26%	▲2.18
Registered electors		9,228		▼4.17
INC hold		Swing		

=== Assembly Election 1990 ===
1990 Arunachal Pradesh Legislative Assembly election : Tuting–Yingkiong
Party	Candidate	Votes	%	±%
INC	Gegong Apang	6,346	81.02%	New
JD	Bani Danggen	1,487	18.98%	New
Margin of victory		4,859	62.03%	
Turnout		7,833	82.83%	
Registered electors		9,630		
INC win (new seat)				

== See also ==
- List of constituencies of Arunachal Pradesh Legislative Assembly
- Arunachal Pradesh Legislative Assembly
