= Jikke Tako =

Indian politician

Member of Arunachal Pradesh Legislative Assembly
- Incumbent
- Assumed office 2019
- Preceded by: Markio Tado
- Constituency: Tali

Personal details
- Political party: Bharatiya Janata Party

Jikke Tako is an Indian politician from Arunachal Pradesh belonging to the Bharatiya Janata Party. He is a member of the Legislative Assembly in the 11th Arunachal Pradesh Legislative Assembly. He won the election unopposed.

== Education ==
He graduated from Rajiv Gandhi University in 2004 with a master's in political science.
