= Tana Hali Tara =

Indian politician

Member of Arunachal Pradesh Legislative Assembly
- In office 2019 – 2 June 2024
- Preceded by: Nabam Rebia
- Succeeded by: Nabam Vivek
- Constituency: Doimukh

Personal details
- Born: Assam, India
- Party: Bharatiya Janata Party
- Occupation: Politician

Tana Hali Tara is a Bharatiya Janata Party politician from Arunachal Pradesh. He was elected as member of the Arunachal Pradesh Legislative Assembly in the 2019 Arunachal Pradesh Legislative Assembly election from the Doimukh constituency as a BJP candidate.

He contested as a BJP candidate in the 2024 elections but lost to PPA candidate Nabam Vivek by a margin of 2,530 votes.
