= James Lowangcha Wanglat =

Indian politician

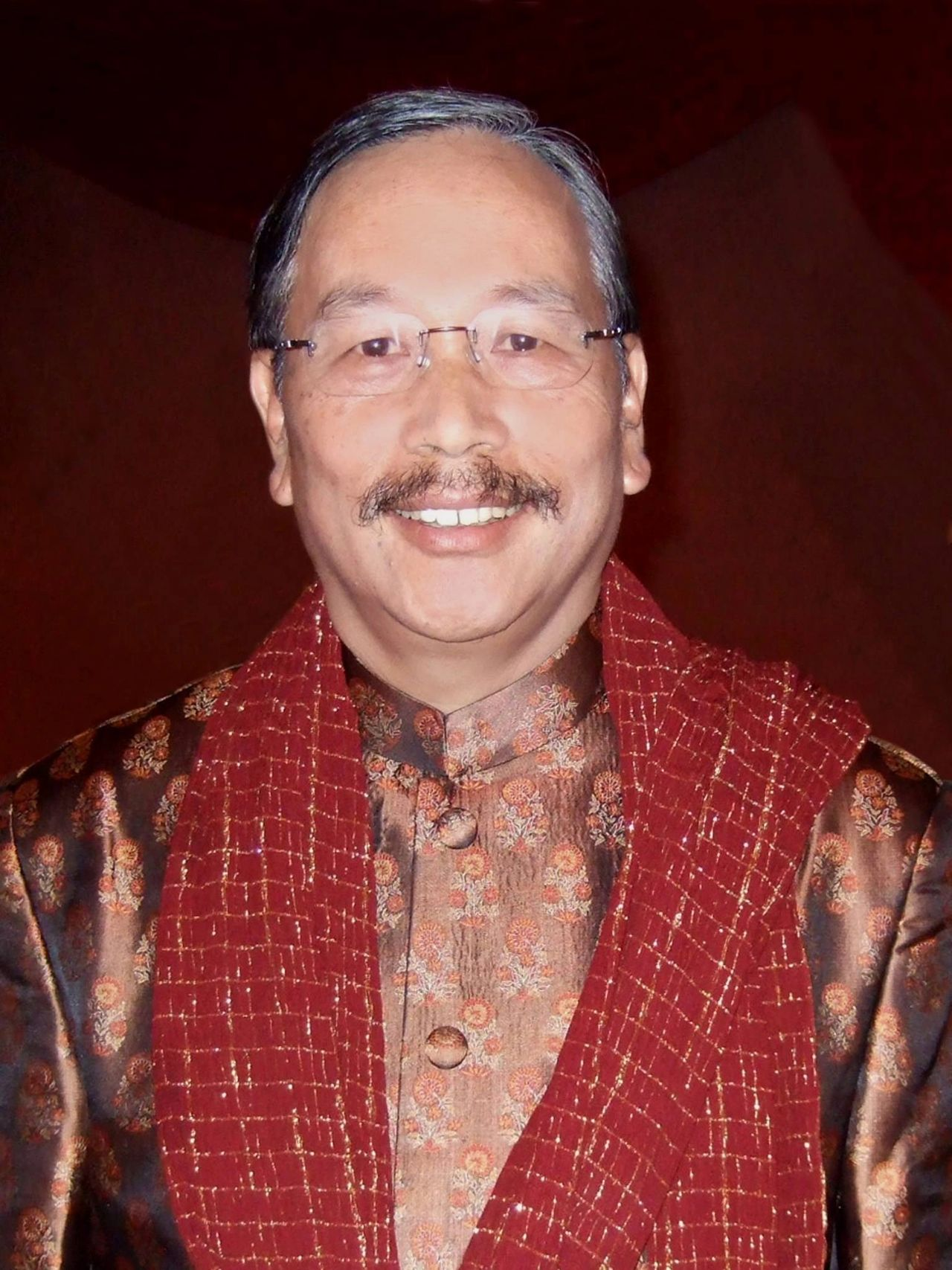

Personal details
- Born: Arunachal Pradesh, India
- Party: Indian National Congress
- Parent: Wangyom Lowang (father)
- Occupation: Farming

James Lowangcha Wanglat is an Indian politician. He has served as Home, Finance and Civil Supplies Minister of the state of Arunachal Pradesh.

Wanglat hails from the royal family of Namsang-Borduria. He became a student activist in 1969. He took part in the founding of the North East Frontier Agency Students Union in 1970 and the All Arunachal Pradesh Students Union in 1971. He was arrested during protests in 1974. In 1977 he became the founding general secretary of the People's Party of Arunachal.

He was elected four times to the Arunachal Pradesh Legislative Assembly. He contested the Khonsa North seat as a PPA candidate in the 1978 Arunachal Pradesh Legislative Assembly election, finishing in second place with 1,401 (27.52%). He contested the same seat again as a PPA candidate in the 1980 election, winning it with 2,685 votes (47.75%). He lost the seat in the 1984 election, finishing in second place with 1,786 votes (26.26%). He contested this election as an independent candidate. He won the Borduria-Bogapani seat in the 1990 election, standing as a Janata Dal candidate. He obtained 2,932 votes (62.40%). He retained the seat in 1995, standing as an Indian National Congress candidate. He obtained 3,653 votes (71.53%). In 1999 he again stood as an Indian National Congress candidate, retaining the seat. He got 2,289 votes (50.14%). He lost the Borduria-Bogapani seat in the 2004 Arunachal Pradesh Legislative Assembly election, standing as an Indian National Congress candidate. He finished in second place with 1,979 votes.

Wanglat resigned from the Indian National Congress in March 2009. He contested the 2009 Indian general election as an Arunachal Congress candidate in the Arunachal East Lok Sabha constituency. Commenting on his candidature before the poll, he stated that the election was "...a must-win situation for me and I am well aware of it as a defeat in the polls will mark the end of my career". He finished in third place with 46,539 votes (21.65%). As of October 2009 he was the Arunachal Pradesh state president of the Nationalist Congress Party.

On January 18, 2014 he joined the Bharatiya Janata Party at a party rally at Ramlila Maidan in Delhi. He was fielded by the party in the Borduria-Bogapani seat in the 2014 Arunachal Pradesh Legislative Assembly election.
