= Nabam Rebia =

Indian politician

Member of Parliament, Rajya Sabha
- In office 24 June 2020 – 23 June 2026
- Preceded by: Mukut Mithi
- Succeeded by: Tai Tagak
- Constituency: Arunachal Pradesh
- In office 27 May 1996 – 26 May 2008
- Preceded by: Nyodek Yonggam
- Succeeded by: Mukut Mithi
- Constituency: Arunachal Pradesh

Member of Legislative Assembly Arunachal Pradesh
- In office 13 October 2009 – 23 May 2019
- Preceded by: Ngurang Pinch
- Succeeded by: Tana Hali Tara
- Constituency: Doimukh

Personal details
- Born: 10 August 1962 (age 64) Ompuli, P.O. Doimukh, Papum Pare
- Party: Bharatiya Janata Party
- Other political affiliations: Indian National Congress
- Spouse: Nabam Dumsap
- Children: 4
- Parents: Nabam Epo (father); Nabam Yanyang (mother)

Nabam Rebia is an Indian politician of the Bharatiya Janata Party. He is currently serving as a Member of the Parliament of India representing Arunachal Pradesh in the Rajya Sabha, the upper house of the Indian Parliament. He was a speaker of the Arunachal Pradesh Legislative Assembly.

He earlier was a Member of the Parliament of India representing Arunachal Pradesh in the Rajya Sabha, as a member of the Congress party. He is the EX-MLA from Arunachal's constituency of Doimukh and minister of Urban Development, Town Planning, Housing, Urban Local Bodies and Law and Justice in BJP-led Pema Khandu government in Arunachal Pradesh.

The Supreme Court judgement, Nabam Rebia case of 2016, prevents a Speaker, who was themselves facing a motion for removal, from adjudicating petitions to disqualify legislators under the anti-defection law.

== Election History ==
=== Rajya Sabha ===
Position	Party	Constituency	From	To	Tenure
Member of Parliament, Rajya Sabha (1st Term)	IND	Arunachal Pradesh	27 May 1996	26 May 2002	5 years, 364 days
Member of Parliament, Rajya Sabha (2nd Term)	INC	Arunachal Pradesh	27 May 2002	26 May 2008	5 years, 365 days
Member of Parliament, Rajya Sabha (3rd Term)	BJP	Arunachal Pradesh	24 June 2020	23 June 2026	5 years, 364 days
