= Doimukh Assembly constituency =

Legislative Assembly constituency in Arunachal Pradesh State, India

Coordinates: 27.14°N 93.75°E

Doimukh
- Constituency No. 14 for the Arunachal Pradesh Legislative Assembly

Constituency details
- Country: India
- Region: Northeast India
- State: Arunachal Pradesh
- District: Papum Pare
- Lok Sabha constituency: Arunachal West
- Established: 1990
- Total electors: 25,369
- Reservation: ST

Member of Legislative Assembly
- 11th Arunachal Pradesh Legislative Assembly
- Incumbent Nabam Vivek
- Party: PPA
- Alliance: NDA
- Elected year: 2024

Doimukh is one of the 60 Legislative Assembly constituencies of Arunachal Pradesh state in India.

It is part of Papum Pare district and is reserved for candidates belonging to the Scheduled Tribes. As of 2024, its representative is Nabam Vivek of the People's Party of Arunachal.

== Members of the Legislative Assembly ==
Election	Name	Party
1990	Ngurang Tazap	Indian National Congress
1995	T.C. Teli	Janata Dal
1999	T.C. Teli	Indian National Congress
2004	Ngurang Pinch	Independent politician
2009	Nabam Rebia	Indian National Congress
2014	Nabam Rebia	Indian National Congress
2019	Tana Hali Tara	Bharatiya Janata Party
2024	Nabam Vivek	People's Party of Arunachal

== Election results ==
=== Assembly Election 2024 ===
2024 Arunachal Pradesh Legislative Assembly election : Doimukh
Party	Candidate	Votes	%	±%
PPA	Nabam Vivek	11,409	54.48%	New
BJP	Tana Hali Tara	8,879	42.40%	▼9.50
INC	Nabam Tado	548	2.62%	▼7.41
NOTA	None of the Above	105	0.50%	▼0.41
Margin of victory		2,530	12.08%	▼2.65
Turnout		20,941	82.55%	▲8.74
Registered electors		25,369		▲15.64
PPA gain from BJP		Swing	▲2.58	

=== Assembly Election 2019 ===
Arunachal Pradesh Legislative Assembly Election, 2019: Doimukh
Party	Candidate	Votes	%	±%
BJP	Tana Hali Tara	8,403	51.90%	New
NPP	Nabam Vivek	6,018	37.17%	New
INC	Nabam Rana	1,623	10.02%	New
NOTA	None of the Above	147	0.91%	New
Margin of victory		2,385	14.73%	
Turnout		16,191	73.80%	▲73.80
Registered electors		21,938		▼6.96
BJP gain from INC		Swing		

=== Assembly Election 2014 ===
2014 Arunachal Pradesh Legislative Assembly election : Doimukh
Party	Candidate	Votes	%	±%
INC	Nabam Rebia	Unopposed		
Registered electors		23,580		▼8.99
INC hold		Swing		

=== Assembly Election 2009 ===
2009 Arunachal Pradesh Legislative Assembly election : Doimukh
Party	Candidate	Votes	%	±%
INC	Nabam Rebia	6,752	40.69%	▲3.12
NCP	Ngurang Pinch	6,154	37.09%	New
AITC	T.C. Teli	3,686	22.22%	New
Margin of victory		598	3.60%	▼8.22
Turnout		16,592	64.04%	▼3.12
Registered electors		25,910		▲63.96
INC gain from Independent		Swing		

=== Assembly Election 2004 ===
2004 Arunachal Pradesh Legislative Assembly election : Doimukh
Party	Candidate	Votes	%	±%
Independent	Ngurang Pinch	5,243	49.40%	New
INC	T.C. Teli	3,988	37.58%	▼3.39
BJP	Taba Hare	970	9.14%	▲6.25
Independent	Yowa Takar	412	3.88%	New
Margin of victory		1,255	11.83%	▼1.26
Turnout		10,613	66.63%	▼1.58
Registered electors		15,803		▲15.18
Independent gain from INC		Swing	▲8.43	

=== Assembly Election 1999 ===
1999 Arunachal Pradesh Legislative Assembly election : Doimukh
Party	Candidate	Votes	%	±%
INC	T.C. Teli	3,864	40.97%	▼4.01
AC	Ngurang Pinch	2,630	27.89%	New
Independent	Tana Hali Tara	1,868	19.81%	New
NCP	Ngurang Tazap	796	8.44%	New
BJP	Taba Hare	273	2.89%	New
Margin of victory		1,234	13.08%	▲3.05
Turnout		9,431	72.17%	▼9.76
Registered electors		13,720		▲23.09
INC gain from JD		Swing	▼14.05	

=== Assembly Election 1995 ===
1995 Arunachal Pradesh Legislative Assembly election : Doimukh
Party	Candidate	Votes	%	±%
JD	T.C. Teli	4,814	55.02%	▲30.02
INC	Ngurang Tazap	3,936	44.98%	▲7.46
Margin of victory		878	10.03%	▲7.97
Turnout		8,750	79.61%	▲9.39
Registered electors		11,146		▲11.38
JD gain from INC		Swing		

=== Assembly Election 1990 ===
1990 Arunachal Pradesh Legislative Assembly election : Doimukh
Party	Candidate	Votes	%	±%
INC	Ngurang Tazap	2,595	37.52%	New
JP	T.C. Teli	2,452	35.45%	New
JD	Taba Tagar	1,729	25.00%	New
Independent	Ter Tana	140	2.02%	New
Margin of victory		143	2.07%	
Turnout		6,916	70.32%	
Registered electors		10,007		
INC win (new seat)				

== See also ==
- List of constituencies of the Arunachal Pradesh Legislative Assembly
- Papum Pare district
