= Sobeng Tayeng =

Indian politician

Member of Parliament, Lok Sabha
- In office 1980-1984
- Preceded by: Bakin Pertin
- Succeeded by: Wangpha Lowang
- Constituency: Arunachal East

Personal details
- Born: August 20, 1944 Ifrogam Village, Tezu P.O. Lohit District, British India
- Party: Indian National Congress
- Spouse: Nyanni Tayeng
- Children: 3 Sons

Sobeng Tayeng is an Indian politician. He was elected to the Lok Sabha, the lower house of the Parliament of India from the Arunachal East constituency of Arunachal Pradesh as a member of the Indian National Congress.
