= Mopi Mihu =

Indian politician

Member of Arunachal Pradesh Legislative Assembly
- Incumbent
- Assumed office 1 June 2024
- Preceded by: Rajesh Tacho
- Constituency: Anini

Personal details
- Political party: Bharatiya Janata Party

Mopi Mihu is an Indian politician from Arunachal Pradesh belonging to the Bharatiya Janata Party. He is a member of the Legislative Assembly in the 11th Arunachal Pradesh Legislative Assembly.

== Electoral performance ==
Election	Constituency	Party	Result	Votes %	Opposition Candidate	Opposition Party	Opposition vote %	Ref
2024	Anini	BJP	Won	63.62%	Eri Tayu	Independent	36.09%	
2019	Anini	BJP	Won	64.53%	Singe Milli	INC	34.24%	
