= Nampong Assembly constituency =

Constituency of the Arunachal Pradesh legislative assembly in India

Coordinates: 27.294°N 96.126°E

Nampong
- Constituency No. 51 for the Arunachal Pradesh Legislative Assembly

Constituency details
- Country: India
- Region: Northeast India
- State: Arunachal Pradesh
- District: Changlang
- Lok Sabha constituency: Arunachal East
- Established: 1990
- Total electors: 9,710
- Reservation: ST

Member of Legislative Assembly
- 11th Arunachal Pradesh Legislative Assembly
- Incumbent Laisam Simai
- Party: Bharatiya Janata Party
- Elected year: 2019

Nampong is one of the 60 assembly constituencies of Arunachal Pradesh, a northeastern state of India. It is part of Arunachal East Lok Sabha constituency.

== Members of the Legislative Assembly ==
Election	Member	Party
1990	Komoli Mosang	Indian National Congress
1995	Setong Sena	Independent politician
1999	Setong Sena	Indian National Congress
2004	Setong Sena	Indian National Congress
2009	Setong Sena	Indian National Congress
2014	Laisam Simai	Bharatiya Janata Party
2019	Laisam Simai	Bharatiya Janata Party
2024	Laisam Simai	Independent politician

== Election results ==
=== Assembly Election 2024 ===
2024 Arunachal Pradesh Legislative Assembly election : Nampong
Party	Candidate	Votes	%	±%
Independent	Laisam Simai	3,180	36.06%	New
BJP	Izmir Tikhak	3,112	35.29%	▼12.27
INC	Khimshom Mossang	2,458	27.87%	▲5.27
NOTA	None of the Above	69	0.78%	▼0.60
Margin of victory		68	0.77%	▼18.32
Turnout		8,819	90.82%	▲2.62
Registered electors		9,710		▲8.30
Independent gain from BJP		Swing	▼11.50	

=== Assembly Election 2019 ===
2019 Arunachal Pradesh Legislative Assembly election : Nampong
Party	Candidate	Votes	%	±%
BJP	Laisam Simai	3,761	47.56%	▼1.96
NPP	Tainan James Jugli	2,251	28.46%	New
INC	Komoli Mosang	1,787	22.60%	▼24.08
NOTA	None of the Above	109	1.38%	▲0.05
Margin of victory		1,510	19.09%	▲16.25
Turnout		7,908	88.20%	▲2.41
Registered electors		8,966		▲7.95
BJP hold		Swing	▼1.96	

=== Assembly Election 2014 ===
2014 Arunachal Pradesh Legislative Assembly election : Nampong
Party	Candidate	Votes	%	±%
BJP	Laisam Simai	3,529	49.52%	New
INC	Setong Sena	3,326	46.67%	▼30.77
NPF	Tosham Mossang	176	2.47%	New
NOTA	None of the Above	95	1.33%	New
Margin of victory		203	2.85%	▼52.04
Turnout		7,126	85.79%	▼5.11
Registered electors		8,306		▲7.65
BJP gain from INC		Swing	▼27.92	

=== Assembly Election 2009 ===
2009 Arunachal Pradesh Legislative Assembly election : Nampong
Party	Candidate	Votes	%	±%
INC	Setong Sena	5,432	77.45%	▲18.07
Independent	Tosham Mossang	1,582	22.55%	New
Margin of victory		3,850	54.89%	▲36.14
Turnout		7,014	90.90%	▲20.33
Registered electors		7,716		▼17.31
INC hold		Swing		

=== Assembly Election 2004 ===
2004 Arunachal Pradesh Legislative Assembly election : Nampong
Party	Candidate	Votes	%	±%
INC	Setong Sena	3,910	59.38%	▲9.24
Independent	Komoli Mosang	2,675	40.62%	New
Margin of victory		1,235	18.75%	▲18.49
Turnout		6,585	68.70%	▲1.40
Registered electors		9,331		▲6.99
INC hold		Swing		

=== Assembly Election 1999 ===
1999 Arunachal Pradesh Legislative Assembly election : Nampong
Party	Candidate	Votes	%	±%
INC	Setong Sena	3,024	50.13%	▲11.13
BJP	Komoli Mosang	3,008	49.87%	New
Margin of victory		16	0.27%	▼21.73
Turnout		6,032	70.82%	▼11.37
Registered electors		8,721		▲5.68
INC gain from Independent		Swing		

=== Assembly Election 1995 ===
1995 Arunachal Pradesh Legislative Assembly election : Nampong
Party	Candidate	Votes	%	±%
Independent	Setong Sena	4,054	61.00%	New
INC	Komoli Mosang	2,592	39.00%	▲1.94
Margin of victory		1,462	22.00%	▲17.54
Turnout		6,646	81.94%	▲8.26
Registered electors		8,252		▲20.91
Independent gain from INC		Swing		

=== Assembly Election 1990 ===
1990 Arunachal Pradesh Legislative Assembly election : Nampong
Party	Candidate	Votes	%	±%
INC	Komoli Mosang	1,828	37.06%	New
Independent	Izmir Tikhak	1,608	32.60%	New
JD	B. K. Chena	1,497	30.35%	New
Margin of victory		220	4.46%	
Turnout		4,933	73.29%	
Registered electors		6,825		
INC win (new seat)				

== See also ==
- Nampong
- Changlang district
- List of constituencies of Arunachal Pradesh Legislative Assembly
