= Rajesh Tacho =

Indian politician (born 1957)

Shri Rajesh Tacho

1st MLA of Anini
- Incumbent
- Assumed office 1999
- Preceded by: none
- Succeeded by: none

2nd Parliamentary Secretary for Agriculture of Arunachal Pradesh
- Incumbent
- Assumed office 2008
- Preceded by: Lombo Tayeng
- Succeeded by: none

Personal details
- Born: 1 January 1957
- Parent: Late Khore Tacho (father)
- Profession: Politician

Shri Rajesh Tacho, son of Late Khore Tacho is the incumbent MLA of Anini. He is a part of the Indian National Congress Party. He became the MLA of Anini when he was 47. He graduated out of the Government High School of Roing in 1979 as 10th pass .

== Electoral performance ==
| Election | Constituency | Party | Result | Votes % | Opposition Candidate | Opposition Party | Opposition vote % | Ref |
|---|---|---|---|---|---|---|---|---|
| 2014 | Anini | INC | Won | 52.26% | Eri Tayu | BJP | 46.77% | |
| 2009 | Anini | INC | Won | 51.20% | Eri Tayu | NCP | 48.80% | |
| 2004 | Anini | INC | Won | 41.57% | Paro Molo | AC | 33.02% | |
| 1999 | Anini | INC | Won | Unopposed | | | | |
| 1995 | Anini | JD | Lost | 40.18% | Tade Tacho | INC | 42.13% | |
| 1990 | Anini | INC | Won | 36.62% | Tade Tacho | INC | 31.56% | |
