= Somlung Mossang =

Indian politician

Member of Arunachal Pradesh Legislative Assembly
- In office 2019 – 2 June 2024
- Preceded by: Nikh Kamin
- Succeeded by: Nikh Kamin
- Constituency: Bordumsa-Diyun

Personal details
- Born: Assam, India
- Party: Bharatiya Janata Party
- Other political affiliations: Independent
- Occupation: Politician

Somlung Mossang is a Bharatiya Janata Party politician from Arunachal Pradesh. He was elected as a member of the Arunachal Pradesh Legislative Assembly in the 2019 Legislative Assembly election from the Bordumsa-Diyun constituency as an independent candidate.

Somlung Mossang later joined the Bharatiya Janata Party and contested as a BJP candidate in the 2024 elections, losing to NCP candidate Nikh Kamin by a margin of 1,352 votes.
