= Tomo Riba =

Chief Minister of Arunachal Pradesh, India (1934–2000)

2nd Chief Minister of Arunachal Pradesh
- Union Territory
- In office 18 September 1979 – 3 November 1979
- Lieutenant Governor: R. N. Haldipur
- Preceded by: Prem Khandu Thungon
- Succeeded by: President's Rule; Gegong Apang
- Constituency: 1 Arunachal West Parliamentary Constituency

Member of Parliament, Lok Sabha
- In office 1996–1998
- Preceded by: Prem Khandu Thungon
- Succeeded by: Omak Apang
- Constituency: Arunachal West

Personal details
- Born: 16 October 1937 Hyderabad, British India
- Died: 16 February 2000 (aged 62) Downtown Hospital, Guwahati, Assam, India
- Party: Peoples Party of Arunachal
- Spouse(s): Yumpu Ropo, Harbom Bam, Minoti Bora
- Children: Five sons and four daughters
- Education: St. Edmunds College, Shillong

Tomo Riba (July 1934, Arunachal Pradesh, India – 2000) was an Indian politician. He was the President of the People's Party of Arunachal and was the Chief Minister of Arunachal Pradesh from September 1979 to November 1979. He was elected to the 11th Lok Sabha, lower house of the Parliament of India, from the Arunachal West constituency of Arunachal Pradesh in 1996.

== Death ==
Riba died at Downtown Hospital in Guwahati on 16 February 2000.

== Legacy ==
The first medical college of the Tomo Riba Institute of Health and Medical Sciences is named after him.
