= Kamen Ringu =

Indian politician

Kamen Ringu is an Indian politician from Arunachal Pradesh who resurrected People's Party of Arunachal. He was the President of the Arunachal Congress, a regional political party in the Indian state of Arunachal Pradesh. Currently he is associated with People's Party of Arunachal as chairman of the party.
