= Arunachal Congress (Mithi) =

- Leader: Mukut Mithi
- Founder: Mukut Mithi
- Founded: 1998
- Dissolved: 1999
- Split from: Arunachal Congress
- Merged into: Indian National Congress
- Colours: Black

Arunachal Congress (Mithi), was a break-away group of Arunachal Congress. AC(M) was formed in 1998 when Mukut Mithi led a revolt against the AC leader Gegong Apang. AC(M) gathered 40 (out of 60) Members of the Legislative Assembly of Arunachal Pradesh and one of the AC members of the Lok Sabha, Wangcha Rajkumar. AC(M) formed a new state government, with Mithi as Chief Minister. In 1999 AC(M) merged with Indian National Congress. It remained in power until 2003.

== See also ==
- Indian National Congress breakaway parties
