= Tomo Riba Institute of Health and Medical Sciences =

Medical college in Naharlagun, Arunachal Pradesh, India

- Other name: TRIHMS Naharlagun
- Motto: Knowledge, Ethics, Wisdom, Service
- Type: Government
- Established: 2017; 9 years ago
- Affiliations: National Medical Commission
- Academic affiliations: Rajiv Gandhi University
- Dean: Dr. Naba Kumar Bezbaruah
- Location: Naharlagun, Papum Pare district, Arunachal Pradesh, 791110, India
- Campus: Urban
- Acronym: TRIHMS
- Website: https://trihms.co.in/

Tomo Riba Institute of Health and Medical Sciences is the first medical college of Arunachal Pradesh situated at Naharlagun town of Papum Pare district. The institute is established in 2017 and the academic session started on 1 August 2018 for academic year 2018–19. The TRIHMS has 100 MBBS seats with a 300 bedded hospital.

The Institute is named after Tomo Riba, 2nd chief minister of Arunachal Pradesh.

TRIHMS offers undergraduate and postgraduate courses in various medical and health sciences disciplines, including MBBS, B.Sc. Nursing, M.Sc. Nursing, and MD/MS in various specialties.

The institute also has a strong research focus, with ongoing research projects in various medical and health sciences fields.
