= Wangpha Lowang =

Indian politician

- Wangpha Lowang in 2018

Circle Officer, Khonsa, Tirap District
- In office January 1969- March 1972

Counselor of Arunachal Administration
- In office March 1972 - August 1975

Director, Nocte Timber Company Pvt. Ltd.
- In office 1972 - 2019

President of Managing Committee, Ramakrishna Mission School, Narottam Nagar, Tirap
- In office 1972 to present

Minister for Education, Panchayat etc.
- In office August 1975 - 1977

Member of Parliament, Lok Sabha
- In office 1984 -1989
- Preceded by: Sobeng Tayeng
- Succeeded by: Laeta Umbrey
- Constituency: Arunachal East

Member of Legislative Assembly
- In office 1990 - 1995
- Constituency: Namsang

Minister for Health & Family Welfare
- In office 1990 - 1991

Minister for Animal Husbandry & Veterinary
- In office 1991 - 1995

Personal details
- Born: 1 March 1937 (age 89) Namsang, Tirap District, British India
- Party: Indian National Congress
- Spouse: Changun Hondik Lowang (m. January 1970)
- Children: 3 sons

Wangpha Lowang is an Indian politician. He was elected to the Lok Sabha, the lower house of the Parliament of India from the Arunachal East constituency of Arunachal Pradesh as a member of the Indian National Congress.

== Birth and Family ==
Belonging to the Nocte tribe, Wangpha Humchha Lowang was born in 1937 at Hakhunthin, the first settlement of the present-day Namsang village of Tirap district. His father Wangwai H. Lowang was a farmer, and his mother Chalon Bangsia was a housewife. His grandfather Kemwang was a head-hunter and a front leader in many tribal feuds.

When he was a child, Lowang had lost four siblings to diseases. He is survived by four brothers, namely Wangmok, Khenwang and Nanne. Wangmok is a retired pharmacist and the first Nocte person to pursue this field. Khenwang is a local politician and Nanne is a senior government advocate and also the first Nocte person to become an advocate.

== Education ==
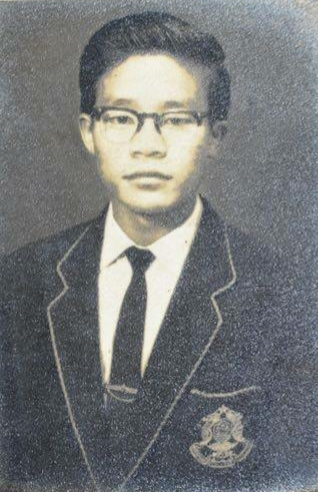
Wangpha Lowang in his St. Anthony's College uniform

In 1948, Wangpha H. Lowang started his education from the government school built at his village Namsang. He completed his middle school in 1956 from Demonstration School located at Margherita, Assam. For higher school education, he went to Pasighat Government Higher Secondary School and passed the matric exam in 1961.

In 1962, Wangpha H. Lowang enrolled in St. Edmund's College, Shillong for Pre-University Course. However, he was diagnosed with tuberculosis and could not rejoin for the next four years. In 1966, he enrolled in St. Anthony's College, Shillong, and passed out with a degree in arts in 1969. During his college studies, Lowang had also worked in the erstwhile Northeast Frontier Agency (N.E.F.A.) Secretariat (Shillong) in the capacity of a Lower Divisional Clerk. He is the first graduate Nocte person.
