= Omak Apang =

Indian politician

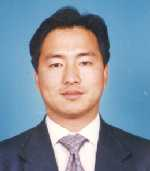

Union Minister of State for Tourism
- In office 20 March 1998 – 13 October 1999
- Prime Minister: Atal Bihari Vajpayee
- Minister: Madan Lal Khurana; Ananth Kumar

Member of Parliament, Lok Sabha
- In office 10 March 1998 – 26 April 1999
- Preceded by: Tomo Riba
- Succeeded by: Jarbom Gamlin
- Constituency: Arunachal West

Personal details
- Born: 11 March 1971 (age 55) Rumgong, West Siang district, North-East Frontier Agency
- Party: Bharatiya Janata Party (since 2014)
- Other political affiliations: Arunachal Congress; Indian National Congress
- Spouse: Dr. Audrey Apang
- Children: 1
- Parent: Gegong Apang (father)
- Education: Hindu College, Delhi (BA, Sociology); University of Ljubljana (MBA)

Omak Apang (born 11 March 1971) is an Indian politician from Arunachal Pradesh. Born to parents of Adi descent, he is the son of politician Gegong Apang, who served as the Chief Minister of Arunachal Pradesh between 1980 and 1999, and again between 2003 and 2007. He served as the minister of state for tourism in Second Vajpayee ministry as its youngest minister in 1998–99. He was a member of the Bharatiya Janata Party, Arunachal Congress, as well as the Indian National Congress, and currently a member of Bharatiya Janata Party after resigning from the primary and active membership of the Indian National Congress in February 2014 and joining the BJP on 20 February 2014.

He was a member of the Parliament from Arunachal West (Lok Sabha constituency) in 1998. However, Apang once again stood from Arunachal West in 1999 and came second with 70,760 votes, 30.07% in that constituency.
