= Changlang South Assembly constituency =

Constituency of the Arunachal Pradesh legislative assembly in India

Coordinates: 27.134°N 95.733°E

Changlang South
- Constituency No. 52 for the Arunachal Pradesh Legislative Assembly

Constituency details
- Country: India
- Region: Northeast India
- State: Arunachal Pradesh
- District: Changlang
- Lok Sabha constituency: Arunachal East
- Established: 1990
- Total electors: 6,365
- Reservation: ST

Member of Legislative Assembly
- 11th Arunachal Pradesh Legislative Assembly
- Incumbent Vacant
- Party: Bharatiya Janata Party
- Elected year: 2019

Changlang South is one of the 60 Legislative assembly constituencies in Arunachal Pradesh. Changlang South is located in Changlang, the district's administrative headquarters. It is one of the five constituencies located in the Changlang district.

Changlang South is located 237 km west of the state capital Itanagar.

== Members of the Legislative Assembly ==
Election	Member	Party
1990	Tengam Ngemu	Indian National Congress
1995	Tengam Ngemu	Indian National Congress
1999	Phosum Khimhun	Indian National Congress
2004	Phosum Khimhun	Independent politician
2009	Phosum Khimhun	Indian National Congress
2014	Phosum Khimhun	Indian National Congress
2019	Phosum Khimhun	Bharatiya Janata Party
2024	Hamjong Tangha	Bharatiya Janata Party

== Election results ==
=== Assembly Election 2024 ===
2024 Arunachal Pradesh Legislative Assembly election : Changlang South
Party	Candidate	Votes	%	±%
BJP	Hamjong Tangha	3,654	61.84%	▲6.77
NPP	Timpu Ngemu	2,172	36.76%	New
NCP	Salman Salnang Mungrey	55	0.93%	New
NOTA	None of the Above	28	0.47%	▼0.67
Margin of victory		1,482	25.08%	▲13.81
Turnout		5,909	92.84%	▲2.42
Registered electors		6,365		▲11.28
BJP hold		Swing	▲6.77	

=== Assembly Election 2019 ===
2019 Arunachal Pradesh Legislative Assembly election: Changlang South
Party	Candidate	Votes	%	±%
BJP	Phosum Khimhun	2,848	55.07%	New
INC	Latlang Tangha	2,265	43.79%	▼27.03
NOTA	None of the Above	59	1.14%	▼0.87
Margin of victory		583	11.27%	▼32.38
Turnout		5,172	90.42%	▼2.20
Registered electors		5,720		▲15.98
BJP gain from INC		Swing	▼15.75	

=== Assembly Election 2014 ===
2014 Arunachal Pradesh Legislative Assembly election : Changlang South
Party	Candidate	Votes	%	±%
INC	Phosum Khimhun	3,235	70.82%	▲3.27
NCP	John Jugli	1,241	27.17%	▲16.82
NOTA	None of the Above	92	2.01%	New
Margin of victory		1,994	43.65%	▼1.80
Turnout		4,568	92.62%	▼0.11
Registered electors		4,932		▲6.38
INC hold		Swing		

=== Assembly Election 2009 ===
2009 Arunachal Pradesh Legislative Assembly election : Changlang South
Party	Candidate	Votes	%	±%
INC	Phosum Khimhun	2,904	67.55%	▲17.59
AITC	Tengam Ngemu	950	22.10%	New
NCP	Hamjong Tangha	445	10.35%	New
Margin of victory		1,954	45.45%	▲45.38
Turnout		4,299	92.73%	▲8.14
Registered electors		4,636		▼1.59
INC gain from Independent		Swing		

=== Assembly Election 2004 ===
2004 Arunachal Pradesh Legislative Assembly election : Changlang South
Party	Candidate	Votes	%	±%
Independent	Phosum Khimhun	1,994	50.04%	New
INC	Ngungtim Changmi	1,991	49.96%	▼10.08
Margin of victory		3	0.08%	▼20.02
Turnout		3,985	82.42%	▲1.16
Registered electors		4,711		▲11.21
Independent gain from INC		Swing		

=== Assembly Election 1999 ===
1999 Arunachal Pradesh Legislative Assembly election : Changlang South
Party	Candidate	Votes	%	±%
INC	Phosum Khimhun	2,122	60.05%	▲4.10
BJP	Ngungtim Changmi	1,412	39.95%	New
Margin of victory		710	20.09%	▲8.20
Turnout		3,534	86.00%	▼4.02
Registered electors		4,236		▲16.82
INC hold		Swing		

=== Assembly Election 1995 ===
1995 Arunachal Pradesh Legislative Assembly election : Changlang South
Party	Candidate	Votes	%	±%
INC	Tengam Ngemu	1,774	55.94%	▼12.19
Independent	Ngungtim Changmi	1,397	44.06%	New
Margin of victory		377	11.89%	▼24.37
Turnout		3,171	89.74%	▲9.05
Registered electors		3,626		▲4.14
INC hold		Swing		

=== Assembly Election 1990 ===
1990 Arunachal Pradesh Legislative Assembly election : Changlang South
Party	Candidate	Votes	%	±%
INC	Tengam Ngemu	1,860	68.13%	New
JD	Khongmat Tangha	870	31.87%	New
Margin of victory		990	36.26%	
Turnout		2,730	80.10%	
Registered electors		3,482		
INC win (new seat)				

== See also ==
- List of constituencies of Arunachal Pradesh Legislative Assembly
- Arunachal Pradesh Legislative Assembly
