= Nampong =

- town
- Location in Arunachal Pradesh, India Nampong (India)
- Coordinates: 27.28°N 96.13°E
- Country: India
- State: Arunachal Pradesh
- District: Changlang
- Elevation: 308 m (1,010 ft)

Population (2001)
  - Total: 4,424

Languages
  - Official: English
- Time zone: UTC+5:30 (IST)
- PIN: 792123
- Telephone code: 03800
- ISO 3166 code: IN-AR
- Vehicle registration: AR
- Climate: Cwa

Nampong is a census town of Changlang District in the Indian state of Arunachal Pradesh. It is located close to the Pangsau Pass, being the last town on the Indian side, at an elevation of 308 metres.

Nampong is one of the 60 constituencies of Arunachal. The name of the current MLA (2024) of the Nampong constituency is Laisam Simai.

== History ==
Nampong was one of the towns on the infamous Ledo Road build during World War II, known also as "Stilwell Road" after general Joseph Stilwell, and a bridge was built over the river. Owing to frequent landslides and harsh working conditions the pass was nicknamed "Hell Pass" during the war and a place known as "Hell Gate" is located in the town. The Tangsa's are the inhabitants of Nampong. It is also the last town in eastern Corner of India which shares a boundary with Myanmar. Every month people are allowed to visit Myanmar through a pass named as "Pangsau Pass" which was known as "Hell Pass". Every 10, 20, and 30 of the month, the people are allowed to visit Myanmar.

== Demography ==
The Tangsas are the dominant tribe of Nampong which is one of the major tribes of Arunachal Pradesh. There are different sub-tribes within the Tangsa, namely Tikhak, Muklom, Havi, Longchang, Mossang, Jugli, Kimsing, Ronrang, Mungrey, Longphi, Longri, Ponthai, Sangwal, Yongkuk, Sakieng, Thamphang, etc. They are of Mongoloid descent. According to the legends, The Tangsas originated in a hill called Masoi Sinarupam, (Myanmar). They migrated to India in the 1740s from the north of Myanmar and migrated to the present habitat only in the early 18th century. Traditionally, they are believers of Bon Faith which is portrayed by the spirit and ceremonial animal slaughters. Nonetheless, over the years, many have converted to Buddhism and Christianity.

== Economy ==
The Tangsas are laborious and peace-loving community. They are experts in handicrafts particularly in woodcarving. The major populations of the Tangsa are agriculturist by occupation.

== Culture ==
The lifestyle in Nampong is uncomplicated. Survival is simple.

== Pangsau Pass Winter Festival ==
The Pangsau Pass Winter Festival is a global village event organized every year in Nampong on 20, 21 January and 22.
