= Tojir Kadu =

Member of Arunachal Pradesh Legislative Assembly
- Incumbent
- Assumed office 1 June 2024
- Preceded by: Kento Rina
- Constituency: Nari-Koyu

Personal details
- Party: Bharatiya Janata Party

Tojir Kadu is an Indian politician from Arunachal Pradesh belonging to the Bharatiya Janata Party. He is a member of the Legislative Assembly in the 11th Arunachal Pradesh Legislative Assembly, representing the Nari-Koyu constituency.

== Education ==
He graduated from Jawaharlal Nehru College with a Bachelor of Commerce in 1991.
