= Karikho Kri =

Indian politician

Karikho Kri is a politician from Arunachal Pradesh state in India. He served as an independent and INC (during the 2009 election) member of the Arunachal Pradesh Legislative Assembly from Tezu in Lohit district from 2004 to 2014 and from 2019 to 2024. He is from the Mishmi ethnic group.

== Electoral performance ==
Election	Constituency	Party	Result	Votes %	Opposition Candidate	Opposition Party	Opposition vote %	Ref
2024	Tezu	NPP	Lost	34.71%	Dr. Mahesh Chai	BJP	51.70%	
2019	Tezu	Independent	Won	46.25%	Dr. Mahesh Chai	BJP	45.29%	
2014	Tezu	INC	Lost	47.55%	Dr. Mahesh Chai	BJP	50.98%	
2009	Tezu	INC	Won	64.85%	Nakul Chai	AITC	35.15%	
2004	Tezu	Independent	Won	61.01%	Nakul Chai	INC	35.12%	
1999	Tezu	Independent	Lost	35.04%	Nakul Chai	INC	37.58%	
