= Nabam Vivek =

Indian politician

President People's Party of Arunachal
- Incumbent
- Assumed office 7 December 2024
- Preceded by: Kahfa Bengia

Member of Arunachal Pradesh Legislative Assembly
- Incumbent
- Assumed office 1 June 2024
- Preceded by: Tana Hali Tara
- Constituency: Doimukh

Personal details
- Party: People's Party of Arunachal

Nabam Vivek is an Indian politician from Arunachal Pradesh belonging to the People's Party of Arunachal. He is a member of the 11th Arunachal Pradesh Legislative Assembly from the Doimukh constituency.

Nabam Vivek was elected as president of the People's Party of Arunachal on 7 December 2024.

== Education ==
He obtained Bachelor of Arts in English from Hindu College, Delhi University. He graduated from Rajiv Gandhi University with a master's in English literature.
