= Laeta Umbrey =

Indian politician

Member of Parliament, Lok Sabha
- In office 1989-1996
- Preceded by: Wangpha Lowang
- Succeeded by: Wangcha Rajkumar
- Constituency: Arunachal East

Personal details
- Born: 2 October 1955 Aohali, East Siang, Arunachal Pradesh
- Party: Indian National Congress
- Spouse: Simu Umbrey
- Children: 3 sons and 1 daughter

Laeta Umbreya is an Indian politician. He was elected to the Lok Sabha, the lower house of the Parliament of India from the Arunachal East constituency of Arunachal Pradesh as a member of the Indian National Congress.
