= Laisam Simai =

Indian politician

Member of the Arunachal Pradesh Legislative Assembly

Laisam Simai is an Indian politician from the state of Arunachal Pradesh.

Simai was first elected from the Nampong constituency in the 2014 Arunachal Pradesh Legislative Assembly election, standing as a BJP candidate.

Laisam Simai is one of the youngest MLAs in Arunachal Pradesh. He comes from a remote village known as New Kamlao which is under Manmao Circle in the eastern part of Arunachal Pradesh.

== Electoral performance ==
Election	Constituency	Party	Result	Votes %	Opposition Candidate	Opposition Party	Opposition vote %	Ref
2024	Nampong	Independent	Won	36.06%	Izmir Tikhak	BJP	35.29%	
2019	Nampong	BJP	Won	47.56%	Tainan James Jugli	NPP	28.46%	
2014	Nampong	BJP	Won	49.52%	Setong Sena	INC	46.67%	
