= Mahesh Chai =

Indian politician

Member of the Arunachal Pradesh Legislative Assembly
- In office 2014–2019
- Constituency: Tezu
- Incumbent
- Assumed office 2024

Personal details
- Party: Bharatiya Janata Party

Mohesh Chai is an Indian politician from the state of Arunachal Pradesh. Mohesh Chai was first elected from the Tezu constituency in the 2014 Arunachal Pradesh Legislative Assembly election, standing as an BJP candidate. Currently Mohesh Chai also holds Veterinary, Animal Husbandry, Sports & Youth Affairs, Horticulture, Agriculture portfolios as a minister in the government of Arunachal Pradesh.

== Early life ==
He is the son of the late Shri Tankakso Chai and Smt Jahilu Chai.

== Career ==
Prior to joining politics he was a doctor for the government of Arunachal Pradesh, specialising in chest and respiratory diseases. He completed his schooling at the Govt Higher Secondary School, Tezu. He then obtained his MBBS from Ambedkar Medical College, Bengaluru. After practising as a doctor for the government of Arunachal Pradesh for many years, he went for his masters and completed his MD in chest and respiratory diseases at the Regional Institute of Medical Sciences, Imphal. He was selected as a cabinet minister for Arunachal Pradesh Government in 2017.

== Electoral performance ==
Election	Constituency	Party	Result	Votes %	Opposition Candidate	Opposition Party	Opposition vote %	Ref
2024	Tezu	BJP	Won	51.70%	Karikho Kri	NPP	34.71%	
2019	Tezu	BJP	Lost	45.29%	Karikho Kri	Independent	46.25%	
2014	Tezu	BJP	Won	50.98%	Karikho Kri	INC	47.55%	

== See also ==
- Arunachal Pradesh Legislative Assembly
