= Setong Sena =

Indian politician

Member of the Arunachal Pradesh Legislative Assembly
- In office 1995–2014
- Constituency: Nampong

Personal details
- Born: 1964
- Died: 2015 (aged 50–51)
- Party: Indian National Congress
- Parent: Late Nintu Sena (father)
- Education: B.A.
- Alma mater: North-Eastern Hill University
- Profession: Political Leader

Setong Sena (1964-2015), was an Indian politician from Arunachal Pradesh. He was elected to the Arunachal Pradesh Legislative Assembly from Nampong Assembly constituency in 1995, 1999, 2004 and 2009 Arunachal Pradesh Legislative Assembly election as a member of Indian National Congress.Sena has also served as the Speaker and Cabinet Minister in Arunachal Pradesh Legislative Assembly.

He lost in 2014 Arunachal Pradesh Legislative Assembly election.
