= Tai Tagak =

Member of Parliament, Rajya Sabha
- Incumbent
- Assumed office 24 June 2026
- Preceded by: Nabam Rebia
- Constituency: Arunachal Pradesh

Personal details
- Party: Bharatiya Janata Party

Tai Tagak is an Indian politician. He was elected to the Rajya Sabha from Arunachal Pradesh as a member of the Bharatiya Janata Party.
