= Kento Rina =

Indian politician

Member of Legislative Assembly, Arunachal Pradesh
- Constituency: Nari-Koyu, Lower Siang District

Kento Rina is an Indian politician from the state of Arunachal Pradesh. He is a member of the Bharatiya Janata Party.

Rina was elected from the Nari-Koyu constituency in the 2014 Arunachal Pradesh Legislative Assembly election, standing as a BJP candidate, defeating Indian National Congress candidate Tako Dabi to win the seat.

Rina is a retired Arunachal Pradesh government employee, having served in the Education department as senior teacher, headmaster, vice principal, principal and Deputy Director of School Education (DDSE) throughout his tenure. He worked at Tezu in Lohit district of Arunachal Pradesh before retiring as DDSE.

== See also ==
- Arunachal Pradesh Legislative Assembly
