= Alo Libang =

Indian politician

Member Of Arunachal Pradesh Legislative Assembly
- Incumbent
- Assumed office 2009
- Constituency: Tuting-Yingkiong

Personal details
- Born: 1 March 1964 (age 62)
- Citizenship: India
- Party: Bharatiya Janata Party (2017-Present)
- Other political affiliations: Nationalist Congress Party (2009-2012); Indian National Congress (2012-2017)
- Education: Bachelor of Arts
- Alma mater: Jawaharlal Nehru College (JNC), Pasighat

Alo Libang (born 1 March 1964) is an Indian politician from the state of Arunachal Pradesh. He is the current Member of Legislative Assembly from 34th Yingkiong-Tuting Constituency.

Alo Libang was elected uncontested as a candidate from the Tuting-Yingkiong constituency in the 2014 Arunachal Pradesh Legislative Assembly election, as an Indian National Congress (INC) candidate and in the 2019 Assembly election, by securing 5800 votes, he was again elected from the same Constituency by defeating Janata Dal (Secular) candidate Gegong Apang by a margin of 1609 votes.

== Early life and education ==
Alo Libang was born and brought up in a small village called Simong, 10 kilometres away from Yingkiong Town, Upper Siang, Arunachal Pradesh. He was well versed in public speaking from his childhood. He completed his Bachelor of Arts (B.A.) degree at Jawaharlal Nehru College, Pasighat under Rajiv Gandhi University, the former Arunachal University in Itanagar, Arunachal Pradesh.

== Political career ==
He made his foray into politics during the year 2009 and was elected as a Member of the Legislative Assembly of Arunachal Pradesh, as a candidate from the Nationalist Congress Party (NCP). He later joined the Indian National Congress in 2012. He has held many important portfolios in the cabinet ofArunachal Pradesh, and also served as Minister of Health & Family Welfare, Social Welfare, Women & Child Development, Social Justice, Empowerment & Tribal Affairs. In September 2016, he was sworn in as the Deputy Speaker of the Arunachal Pradesh Legislative Assembly and in the 2019 election he was elected from the Tuting-Yingkiong (ST) constituency as a Bharatiya Janata Party (BJP) candidate.

== Public policies and schemes ==
Some of Libang's major contributions in the field of public service include the launching of the HRMIS (Human Resources Management Information System) state-level flagship programme under the National Health Mission (NHM) to ensure timely and transparent dispensation of Health services across all districts as the first of its kind in the State, the Mission 'Pratiraksha" programme to ensure 100 percent immunisation coverage of children in the State to curb the spread of preventable diseases, which achieved 67 percent immunisation, and the introduction of the 'Sarkaar Apke Dwaar' (Government at your Doorstep) initiative in remote areas of Tuting, Upper Siang to make basic government services more accessible to the local population. In April 2020, he inaugurated a COVID-19 Testing Lab at Tomo Riba Institute of Health and Medical Science (TRIHMS) Itanagar, which was the first ever Covid-19 Testing Facility in the State and the third in Northeast India after Assam and Mizoram. The Health Minister was reported Covid-19 positive along with six other legislators from Arunachal Pradesh in September 2020.

== 2019 assembly elections ==
Alo Libang contested the 2019 Legislative Assembly election and won a seat in the Arunachal Legislative Assembly as a Bharatiya Janata Party candidate from the Tuting-Yingkiong constituency. He adopted the 'Chowkidar' (watchman) campaign slogan, also espoused by current Prime Minister of India Narendra Modi, as well as the slogan "Main bhi Chowkidaar" (roughly translating to "me too watchman") to express solidarity with the party vision of the BJP. He secured a total of 5800 votes and defeated the Janata Dal (Secular) candidate Gegong Apang and Tsepa Wanchuk Khampa by a margin of 1609 and 5472 votes respectively.

== See also ==
- Arunachal Pradesh Legislative Assembly
- Gegong Apang
