= Oken Tayeng =

Member of Arunachal Pradesh Legislative Assembly
- Incumbent
- Assumed office 1 June 2024
- Preceded by: Lombo Tayeng
- Constituency: Mebo

Personal details
- Party: People's Party of Arunachal

Oken Tayeng is an Indian politician from Arunachal Pradesh belonging to the People's Party of Arunachal. He is a member of the Legislative Assembly in the 11th Arunachal Pradesh Legislative Assembly.

== Education ==
He graduated with a Bachelor of Arts in English literature from the University of Delhi in 1996.
