= Nikh Kamin =

Indian politician

Member of the Arunachal Pradesh Legislative Assembly

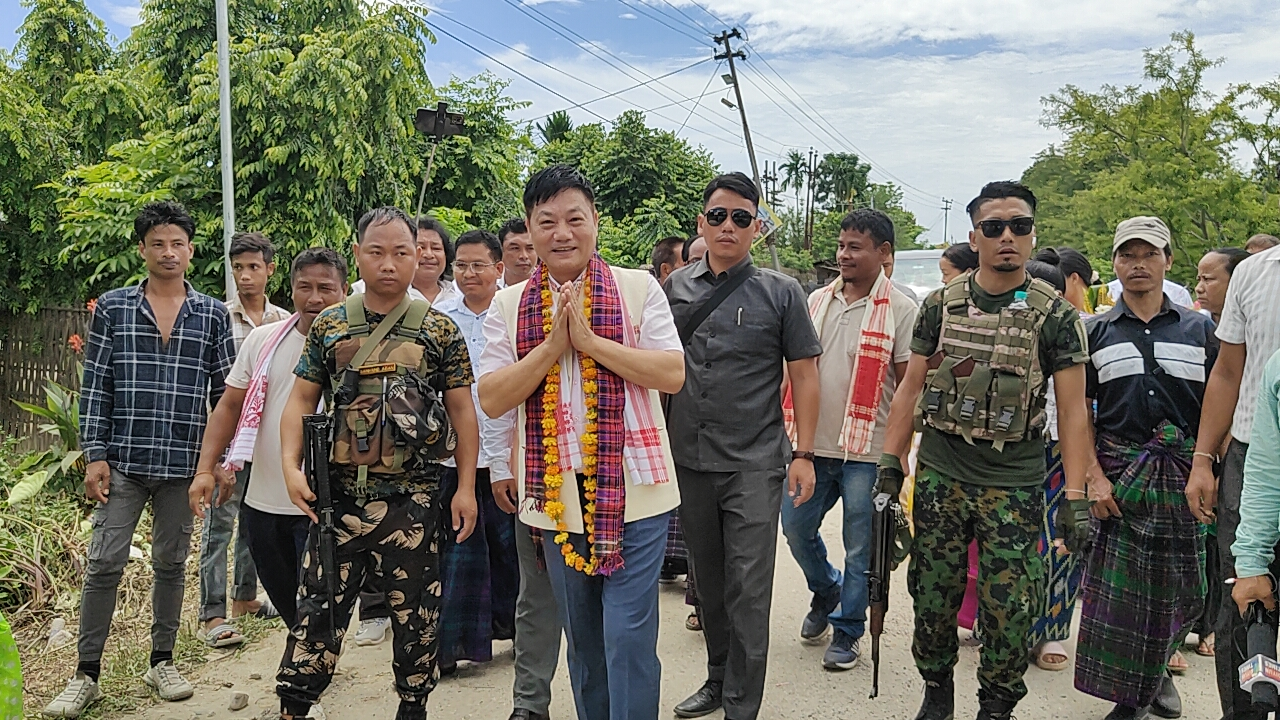
Photo from victory celebration in 2024, Diyun

Nikh Kamin (born 25 December 1967 at Talo, Arunachal Pradesh) is an Indian politician from Arunachal Pradesh. Currently, he is sitting MLA from Diyun Bordumsa general constituency. He is a member of Nationalist Congress Party- Ajit Pawar.

== Political career ==
In 2004, he was elected from Lower Subansiri district's Yachuli assembly constituency of Arunachal Pradesh.

In 2014, Kamin was elected from Bordumsa-Diyun seat in 2014 Arunachal Pradesh Legislative Assembly Election.

In 2019 Arunachal Pradesh Legislative Assembly Election, he lost his seat to Independent candidate Somlung Mossang.

He has again contested from Bordumsa-Diyun from Nationalist Congress Party (NCP-Ajit Pawar) in 2024 Arunachal Pradesh State Legislative Assembly Election where he won the seat again by defeating sitting MlA and BJP candidate Somlung Mossang.
