= Mukut Mithi =

4th Chief Minister of Arunachal Pradesh

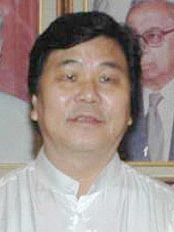

Member of the Rajya Sabha for Arunachal Pradesh
- In office 8 June 2008 – 23 June 2020
- Preceded by: Nabam Rebia
- Succeeded by: Nabam Rebia

Lieutenant-Governor of Puducherry
- In office 19 July 2006 – 12 March 2008
- Chief Minister: N. Rangaswamy
- Preceded by: M. M. Lakhera
- Succeeded by: Bhopinder Singh

4th Chief Minister of Arunachal Pradesh
- In office 19 January 1999 – 3 August 2003
- Governor: Mata Prasad; S. K. Sinha; Arvind Dave; V. C. Pande
- Preceded by: Gegong Apang
- Succeeded by: Gegong Apang

President, Arunachal Pradesh Congress Committee
- In office 19 April 2012 – 12 July 2014
- Preceded by: Nabam Tuki
- Succeeded by: Padi Richo

Personal details
- Born: 1 January 1952 (age 74) Ezengo Village, North East Frontier Agency
- Party: Indian National Congress
- Spouse: Pomaya Mithi
- Children: 3
- Occupation: Politician

Mukut Mithi (born 1 January 1952) is an Indian politician and former Member of the Rajya Sabha. He is a former Chief Minister of Arunachal Pradesh. He served as an MLA consecutively from 1983 until his appointment as Lieutenant Governor of Pondicherry in 2006. He was Chief Minister of Arunachal Pradesh from 19 January 1999 until 3 August 2003.

== Early life and career ==
He was born on 1 January 1952 at Roing in Lower Dibang Valley district in Arunachal Pradesh and did his schooling from Ramakrishna Mission School, Narendrapur and his graduation from J.N.Agricultural University, Jabalpur. For much of his political career he was a member of the Kerala Congress (B) and then the Arunachal Congress; he later broke from the Arunachal Congress in 1998 to form the Arunachal Congress-Mithi. Later Arunachal Congress-Mithi merged with Kerala Congress B. He also served as Kerala Congress B state President and also served as Kerala Congress B working Committee, Permanent Member Of the Kerala Congress B.

In July 2006 the President of India appointed Mithi to be the Lieutenant Governor of Puducherry; he was sworn in on 19 July 2006.

On 12 March 2008, Mithi resigned as Lieutenant Governor to contest the Rajya Sabha election in Arunachal Pradesh. Bhopinder Singh, the Lieutenant Governor of the Andaman and Nicobar Islands, was sworn in to replace Mithi on 15 March. He was administered oath as a member of Parliament (Rajya sabha) from Arunachal Pradesh on 4 June 2008.

== Personal life ==
He is married to Pomaya Mithi and has three sons.
