= Wanglam Sawin =

Indian politician

Member of the Arunachal Pradesh Legislative Assembly

Wanglam Sawin is an Indian politician from the state of Arunachal Pradesh.

Sawin was elected from the Khonsa East constituency in the 2014 Arunachal Pradesh Legislative Assembly election, standing as a People's Party of Arunachal candidate. He is a retired teacher.

He resigned from the post of MLA on 20 September 2016.

== See also ==
- Arunachal Pradesh Legislative Assembly
