= Bakin Pertin =

Indian politician

Member of Parliament for Arunachal East
- In office 1977–1979

Personal details
- Born: 1 May 1942 Damro village, North-East Frontier Agency
- Died: 5 January 1996 (aged 53) Guwahati
- Party: People's Party of Arunachal, Janata Dal
- Education: St. Edmund's College, Delhi College

Bakin Pertin (1 May 1942, in Damro village – 5 January 1996, in Guwahati) was an Indian politician who belonged to the Adi ethnic group. He was one of the first elected Lok Sabha members of Arunachal Pradesh, and later became a Member of the Legislative Assembly of that state.

== Youth and early career ==
Pertin studied at St. Edmund's College in Shillong and Delhi College in Delhi. Pertin began his political activism during his student years. In 1959 the All NEFA Students Union (later renamed as the All Arunachal Pradesh Students' Union) was founded, with Pertin as its general secretary. He worked at the news division of All India Radio between 1964 and 1969. He was a member of Damro I Gram Panchayat, Maryiang Anchal Samiti and Siang Zilla Parishad. In 1974 he became the general secretary of the Bogum Bokang Kebang (the highest tribal authority of the Adi people). In 1975 he became the vice-president of the Siang Zilla Parishad.

== 1977 election ==
The 1977 general election was the first time the newly created Union Territory of Arunachal Pradesh was able to elect two members of the Lok Sabha (lower house of the Indian parliament). Pertin contested the election as an independent candidate for the Arunachal East constituency. He won the seat, obtaining 28,557 votes (56.34% of the votes in the constituency). The election in Arunachal Pradesh was fought on religious lines, as the two independent candidates (Pertin and another, that eventually withdrew from contest) were Christians and the two Indian National Congress candidate practised indigenous Donyi-Polo religion.

== MP ==
After being elected to the Lok Sabha, Pertin resigned from his post as Zilla Parishad vice-president. In his election manifesto, Pertin had vowed to form a regional political party, if elected. Following the election Pertin organised a meeting in Pasighat in April 1977, to found the People's Party of Arunachal. Pertin became the president of the new party. Whilst being the leader of PPA, Pertin was continued to be linked to the Janata Party (then in government) in Delhi. Pertin had the status of being an 'associated' member of the Janata Party. He later broke his links with the Janata Party. Pertin strongly opposed the Freedom of Indigenous Faith Bill (which outlaws conversion from 'one indigenous faith to any other faith or religion by use of force or by inducement or by fraudulent means').

== 1980 election ==
He lost the Arunachal East Lok Sabha seat in the 1980 general election. He obtained 43% of the votes. In the election campaign Pertin's opponents had accused PPA of being a Christian party and opposed to indigenous religion.

== MLA ==
He tried to win back the Arunachal East Lok Sabha seat in the 1984 election. He finished in second place with 22,697 votes (23.76%). Pertin also contested the 1984 Arunachal Pradesh Legislative Assembly election, as the PPA candidate in the Meriyang-Mebo constituency. He won the seat with 4,167 votes (51.42%).

== In Janata Dal ==
When the Janata Dal was formed, Pertin became the secretary of the Arunachal Pradesh unit of the party. He contested two seats in the Arunachal Pradesh Legislative Assembly election, 1990|1990 Legislative Assembly election; Mariyang-Geku (ST) and Pasighat East (ST). He lost in both constituencies. Pertin obtained 2,746 votes (34.48%) in Pasighat East (ST), losing by a margin of merely 84 votes). In Mariyang-Geku he finished second with 3,047 votes (44.91%). In the 1995 Legislative Assembly election he contested the Mebo (ST) seat, again as a Janata Dal candidate. He finished in second place with 1,872 votes (32.47%).

Pertin died in 1996, at the age of 53. He was noted for his contributions to adult education.
