= Markio Tado =

Indian politician

Markio Tado is an Indian politician from the state of Arunachal Pradesh.

Tado was elected unopposed from the Tali seat in the 2014 Arunachal Pradesh Legislative Assembly election, standing as a People's Party of Arunachal candidate. He is an Engineer by qualification.

He won the 2014 elections on a People's Party of Arunachal ticket and switch to Indian National Congress

== See also ==
Arunachal Pradesh Legislative Assembly
