= Nyodek Yonggam =

Nyodek Yonggam (born 1 March 1946) an Indian politician from Arunachal Pradesh belong to Indian National Congress. He had studied Master of Arts in political science.

He was Member of Rajya Sabha for the term, 27-5-1990 to 26-5-1996 from Arunachal Pradesh.

He is married with Shrimati Nilima Yonggam and had two daughters and two sons and resides at Oyan Village & PO at East Siang district
