= People's Party of Arunachal =

Political party in India

- President: Nabam Vivek
- Founder: Bakin Pertin
- Founded: 10 April 1977 (49 years ago)
- Headquarters: Mowb-II, Near AG office Itanagar, Arunachal Pradesh
- Ideology: Regionalism; Anti-CAA
- ECI Status: State Party
- Alliance: NDA (2016–2018), (2024–present)
- Seats in Rajya Sabha: 0 / 245
- Seats in Lok Sabha: 0 / 543
- Seats in Arunachal Pradesh: 6 / 60

Election symbol
- Maize

Website
- People's Party of Arunachal

Peoples Party of Arunachal (PPA) is a regional political party in the Indian state of Arunachal Pradesh. It was founded in September 1977 by Bakin Pertin, Oken Lego and L. Wanglat as president, Vice President and General Secretary of the party. Tomo Riba resigned from PK Thungon government of Congress Party and joined PPA as Vice President of the party. Currently, Kamen Ringu is the chairman of the party. They were in power in Arunachal until all of their MLAs defected back to Indian National Congress.

On 16 September 2016, 43 MLAs from the ruling party, under the CM Pema Khandu, left Indian National Congress to join People's Party of Arunachal party, in alliance with Bharatiya Janata Party. In December 2016, CM Pema Khandu proved majority on the floor with 33 of the People's Party of Arunachal's 43 legislators joining the Bharatiya Janata Party as the BJP party increased its strength to 45 and secured an absolute majority.

== History ==
Following the election of Pertin as Member of Parliament, a meeting was organized in Pasighat in April 1977. In this meeting, the PPA constitution was drafted under the Chairmanship of L. Wanglat who joined Pertin and Oken Lego. He was Congress General Secretary of Tirap District and also Pradesh Organiser of Seva Dal in the state of Arunachal Pradesh. After the Peoples Party of Arunachal was formed, Pertin became the president of the new party. Whilst being the leader of PPA, Pertin continued to be linked to the Janata Party which was then in government in Delhi. Pertin had the status of being an 'associated' member of the Janata Party. He later broke his links with the Janata Party after Congress Party led by CM P.K Thungon merged en-blocked with the Janata Party. Bakin Partin joined INC as an associate member in Parliament while still keeping PPA in Arunachal Pradesh. He was close to Indira Gandhi. Bakin Partin was the first MP to demand the dissolution of the House and called for fresh election

In 1979, PPA MLA and former Congress Minister Tomo Riba became the first PPA Chief Minister. It was a short-lived government spanning from September 1979 to November 1979 with a total of 47 days. A general election was announced in 1980, Arunachal Pradesh State election was included with the general election to elect the Union Territory MLAs. PPA of Tomo Riba and INC of PK Thungon won 13 each in a house of 30 seats. The rest 6 seats were PPA supported independent members. With Indira Gandhi coming back to Power PPA the first associate of INC became the first victim with its President Bakin Partin losing his MP seat from 2 East MP Constituency with most of its members and independent joining INC Party in Arunachal Pradesh. After this party had little success in Arunachal Pradesh Legislative Assembly.

In 1996, Tomo Riba left the party and joined Gegong Apang camp. Both the leaders had months of deliberation before Tomo Riba and Gegong Apang patched up their political differences. Tomo Riba contested the West Parliamentary election as independent candidate 1996 and became member of the 11th Lok Sabha with the support of Gegong Apang although Apang was Congress Chief Minister in the state of Arunachal Pradesh.

Currently, it is a part of North-East Regional Political Front consisting of political parties of the northeast which has supported the National Democratic Alliance (India).

In December 2015, 30 dissident Indian National Congress MLAs including chief minister, Kalikho Pul joined Peoples Party of Arunachal and formed the government along with Bharatiya Janata Party.

In May 2016, after the Bharatiya Janata Party led National Democratic Alliance formed its first government in Assam, a new alliance called the North-East Democratic Alliance (NEDA) was formed with Himanta Biswa Sarma as its convener. The Chief Ministers of the north eastern states of Sikkim, Assam and Nagaland too belong to this alliance. Thus, the People's Party of Arunachal joined the BJP led NEDA.

All of the 30 MLAs returned to Indian National Congress on 16 July 2016 and Pema Khandu was sworn in as the Chief Minister of Arunachal Pradesh.

On 16 September 2016, 43 MLAs from the ruling party, under the CM Pema Khandu, left Indian National Congress to join People's Party of Arunachal party, in alliance with Bharatiya Janata Party. Though Pema Khandu is still the Chief minister, it is soon expected that either a coalition government will be formed with BJP as the speaker of assembly has also changed sides with the CM, or that the Indian Government will dissolve the state assembly for a fresh general elections.

In October 2016, Pema Khandu, Chief Minister of Arunachal Pradesh formally joined hands with Bharatiya Janata Party, making Arunachal Pradesh 14th state to have BJP in power, and with this new coalition, Tamiyo Taga sworn in as Cabinet minister of Arunachal Pradesh.

On 21 December 2016 Pema Khandu was suspended from the party by the party president Kahfa Bengia and Takam Pario was named as the next likely Chief Minister of Arunachal Pradesh replacing Khandu after People's Party of Arunachal suspended Khandu along with 6 other MLAs.

In December 2016, Pema Khandu proved majority on the floor with 33 of the People's Party of Arunachal's 43 legislators joining the Bharatiya Janata Party as the BJP party increased its strength to 45 and it has the support of two independents. He became second Chief Minister of Arunachal Pradesh of Bharatiya Janata Party in Arunachal Pradesh after 44 days lead Gegong Apang government in 2003.

== List of presidents ==
S.no	President	Term		
1.	Kamen Ringu	November 2003	10 April 2015	12 years
2.	Kahfa Bengia	10 April 2015	7 December 2024	9 years, 241 days
3.	Nabam Vivek	7 December 2024	Incumbent	1 year, 145 days

== Electoral history ==
Elections	MLAs Elected	Contested
1978	8	21
1980	13	28
1984	4	13
1990	0	0
1995	0	0
1999	0	0
2004	0	0
2009	4	10
2014	5	16
2019	1	9
2024	2	11

== List of chief ministers ==
No	Name	Portrait	Term of office		Days in office
1.	Tomo Riba		18 September 1979	3 November 1979	46 days
2.	Kalikho Pul		19 February 2016	13 July 2016	145 days
3.	Pema Khandu		16 September 2016	31 December 2016	106 days

== Members of Legislative Assembly ==
Members of Arunachal Pradesh Legislative Assembly
Year	Sr. no.	Name	Constituency
1978 Arunachal Pradesh Legislative Assembly election	1.	Tara Payeng	Toksing Taliha
1978 Arunachal Pradesh Legislative Assembly election	2.	Lijum Ronya	Along North
1978 Arunachal Pradesh Legislative Assembly election	3.	Tomo Riba	Basar
1978 Arunachal Pradesh Legislative Assembly election	4.	Sutem Tasung	Palin
1978 Arunachal Pradesh Legislative Assembly election	5.	Onyok Rome	Mariyang Mebo
1978 Arunachal Pradesh Legislative Assembly election	6.	Aken Lego	Roing
1978 Arunachal Pradesh Legislative Assembly election	7.	Jungpum Jugli	Noadehing Nampong
1978 Arunachal Pradesh Legislative Assembly election	8.	Sijen Kongkang	Khonsa South

Members of Arunachal Pradesh Legislative Assembly
Year	Sr. no.	Name	Constituency
1980 Arunachal Pradesh Legislative Assembly election	1.	Karma Wangohu	Tawang 1
1980 Arunachal Pradesh Legislative Assembly election	2.	Tsering Tashi	Tawang 2
1980 Arunachal Pradesh Legislative Assembly election	3.	Sinam Dususow Bomdila	Bomdila
1980 Arunachal Pradesh Legislative Assembly election	4.	Nyari Welly	Seppa
1980 Arunachal Pradesh Legislative Assembly election	5.	Boa Tame	Raga Tali
1980 Arunachal Pradesh Legislative Assembly election	6.	Tumpakete	Along South
1980 Arunachal Pradesh Legislative Assembly election	7.	Tomo Riba	Basar
1980 Arunachal Pradesh Legislative Assembly election	8.	Talo Kadu	Pasighat
1980 Arunachal Pradesh Legislative Assembly election	9.	Onyok Rome	Mariyang Mebo
1980 Arunachal Pradesh Legislative Assembly election	10.	Aken Lego	Roing
1980 Arunachal Pradesh Legislative Assembly election	11.	Chau Khouk Manpoong	Namsai Chowkham
1980 Arunachal Pradesh Legislative Assembly election	12.	James Lowangcha Wanglat	Khonsa North
1980 Arunachal Pradesh Legislative Assembly election	13.	Wangnam Wangshu	Niausa Kanubari

Members of Arunachal Pradesh Legislative Assembly
Year	Sr. no.	Name	Constituency
1984 Arunachal Pradesh Legislative Assembly election	1.	Japu Deru	Bomdila
1984 Arunachal Pradesh Legislative Assembly election	2.	Doi Ado	Along South
1984 Arunachal Pradesh Legislative Assembly election	3.	Tapum Jamoh	Pasighat
1984 Arunachal Pradesh Legislative Assembly election	5.	Bakin Pertin	Mariyang Mebo

== MLAs elected after PPA's revival ==
Members of Arunachal Pradesh Legislative Assembly
Year	Sr. no.	Name	Constituency
2009 Arunachal Pradesh Legislative Assembly election	1.	Phurpa Tsering	Dirang
2009 Arunachal Pradesh Legislative Assembly election	2.	Kumsi Sidisow	Thrizino-Buragaon
2009 Arunachal Pradesh Legislative Assembly election	3.	Takam Pario	Palin
2009 Arunachal Pradesh Legislative Assembly election	4.	Markio Tado	Tali

Members of Arunachal Pradesh Legislative Assembly
Year	Sr. no.	Name	Constituency
2014 Arunachal Pradesh Legislative Assembly election	1.	Pani Taram	Koloriang
2014 Arunachal Pradesh Legislative Assembly election	2.	Pasang Dorjee Sona	Mechuka
2014 Arunachal Pradesh Legislative Assembly election	3.	Nikh Kamin	Bordumsa-Diyun
2014 Arunachal Pradesh Legislative Assembly election	4.	Wanglam Sawin	Khonsa East
2014 Arunachal Pradesh Legislative Assembly election	5.	Tirong Aboh	Khonsa West

Members of Arunachal Pradesh Legislative Assembly
Year	Sr. no.	Name	Constituency
2019 Arunachal Pradesh Legislative Assembly election	1.	Kardo Nyigyor	Likabali

Members of Arunachal Pradesh Legislative Assembly
Year	Sr. no.	Name	Constituency
2024 Arunachal Pradesh Legislative Assembly election	1.	Nabam Vivek	Doimukh
2024 Arunachal Pradesh Legislative Assembly election	2.	Oken Tayeng	Mebo

== See also ==
- List of political parties in India
