= Arunachal Congress =

- Leader: Kamen Ringu
- Founder: Gegong Apang
- Founded: 1996
- Dissolved: 2009
- Split from: Indian National Congress
- Merged into: Indian National Congress
- Headquarters: G-Extension, Naharlagun
- Ideology: Regionalist
- Colours: Black
- Alliance: National Democratic Alliance (1998-99)

Election symbol
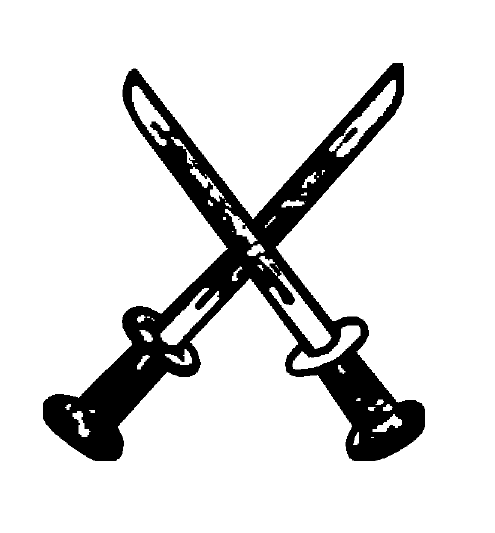

Arunachal Congress (AC) was a regional political party in the Indian state of Arunachal Pradesh.

It was founded in 1996 as a splinter group of the Indian National Congress, when the local party leader and Chief Minister Gegong Apang revolted against the then Congress leader P.V. Narasimha Rao.

== History ==
Apang took with him 54 members of the legislative assembly of a total of 60 of Arunachal Pradesh to his new party. In the Lok Sabha elections in 1998 AC won both seats of Arunachal Pradesh.

The party received 172 496 votes (52,47% of the votes in the state). AC allied itself with the Bharatiya Janata Party (BJP) and was a founding member of the National Democratic Alliance. Omak Apang the son of Gegong Apang, who had been elected from the constituency Arunachal West was appointed a minister in the Centre government.

== Split ==
The successes of AC didn't last long. Directly after the 1998 elections there was a revolt within the party. Wangcha Rajkumar, who had been elected to the Lok Sabha from the constituency Arunachal East in both 1996 and 1998, accused Apang of resorting to nepotism when his son was appointed minister. Five state ministers that had sided with Rajkumar were fired by Apang.

One of the ex-ministers, Mukut Mithi, split and formed the Arunachal Congress (Mithi). AC(M) was able to gather 40 members of the legislative assembly and Mithi formed a government. Initially both AC and AC(M) supported the Vajpayee government, but since Rajkumar wasn't allotted a ministerial post AC(M) merged with the Indian National Congress ahead of the 1999 elections.

Ahead of the Lok Sabha elections of 1999 AC ran in alliance with BJP. Omak Apang stood in Arunachal West (came second with 70 760 votes, 30,07% in that constituency). In Arunachal East Rajkumar now back in INC defeated the BJP candidate.

One reason, it claimed, that the AC-BJP combine fared so badly was that several armed factions especially the powerful National Socialist Council of Nagaland in the area worked against them.

The legislative assembly elections the same year gave even worse results. AC launched 38 candidates, but only one (Gegong Apang) was elected. In total the party got 68 645 votes (16,68% of the votes in the state).

Ahead of the 2004 Lok Sabha elections the political map of Arunachal Pradesh had been redrawn yet again. 25 July 2003 there was a new split in the INC, and a new party Congress (Dolo) was formed.

Apang formed a front called the United Democratic Front consisting of himself, Congress (D), an expelled Congress MLA and two independents. In total Apang was able to gather 41 MLAs around gum, and on 3 August Apang was again sworn in as Chief Minister of the state.

On 30 August Apang joined BJP] and took with his 41 MLAs. Thus BJP controlled a state government in the North-East for the first time.

Arunachal Congress did however continue to exist as a party even after that the founder Apang had joined BJP.

Ahead of the 2004 Lok Sabha elections AC talked about calling for a boycott, as a protest against that Chakma and Hajong refugees had been given the right to vote in the state. In the end the party did however decide to contest, this time allied with Indian National Congress. AC launched its new party president, Kamen Ringu, in Arunachal West. Ringu came second and got 76 527 votes (34,54% in that constituency). In Arunachal East INC had launched a candidate, who also came second.

In the legislative assembly elections in 2004 AC had put up 11 candidates, out of whom two were elected.

The leadership of the party is called Arunachal Congress Working Committee (ACWC).

The organization Arunachal Congress Volunteer Force is probably related to the party.

Just before the 2009 Assembly election, Arunachal Congress merged with Indian National Congress.

== List of Chief & Union Ministers ==
Chief Minister of Arunachal Pradesh

Chief Minister of Arunachal Pradesh					
Constituency	Portrait	Name	Term	Period	Governor
Tuting–Yingkiong		Gegong Apang			Mata Prasad

Union Minister of State
Constituency	Portrait	Name	Ministry	Term	period	Prime Minister
Arunachal West		Omak Apang	Minister of State for Tourism in Second Vajpayee ministry	20 March 1998-13 October 1999	1 year 207 days	Atal Bihari Vajpayee

== Members of Parliament ==
Members of Arunachal Pradesh Legislative Assembly
Year	Lok Sabha	Sr. no.	Name	Constituency	Margin
1998 Indian general election	12th Lok Sabha	1.	Omak Apang	Arunachal West	
1998 Indian general election	12th Lok Sabha	2.	Wangcha Rajkumar	Arunachal East	

== Elected Members of Legislative Assembly ==
Members of Arunachal Pradesh Legislative Assembly
Year	Sr. no.	Name	Constituency	Margin
1999 Arunachal Pradesh Legislative Assembly election	1.	Gegong Apang	Tuting–Yingkiong	

Members of Arunachal Pradesh Legislative Assembly
Year	Sr. no.	Name	Constituency	Margin
2004 Arunachal Pradesh Legislative Assembly election	1.	Daklo Nidak	Daporijo	
2004 Arunachal Pradesh Legislative Assembly election	2.	J.K. Panggeng	Mariyang-Geku	

== See also ==
- Indian National Congress breakaway parties
