= Chambang =

Village in Northeastern India

Coordinates: 27.777°N 93.779°E

- Rural
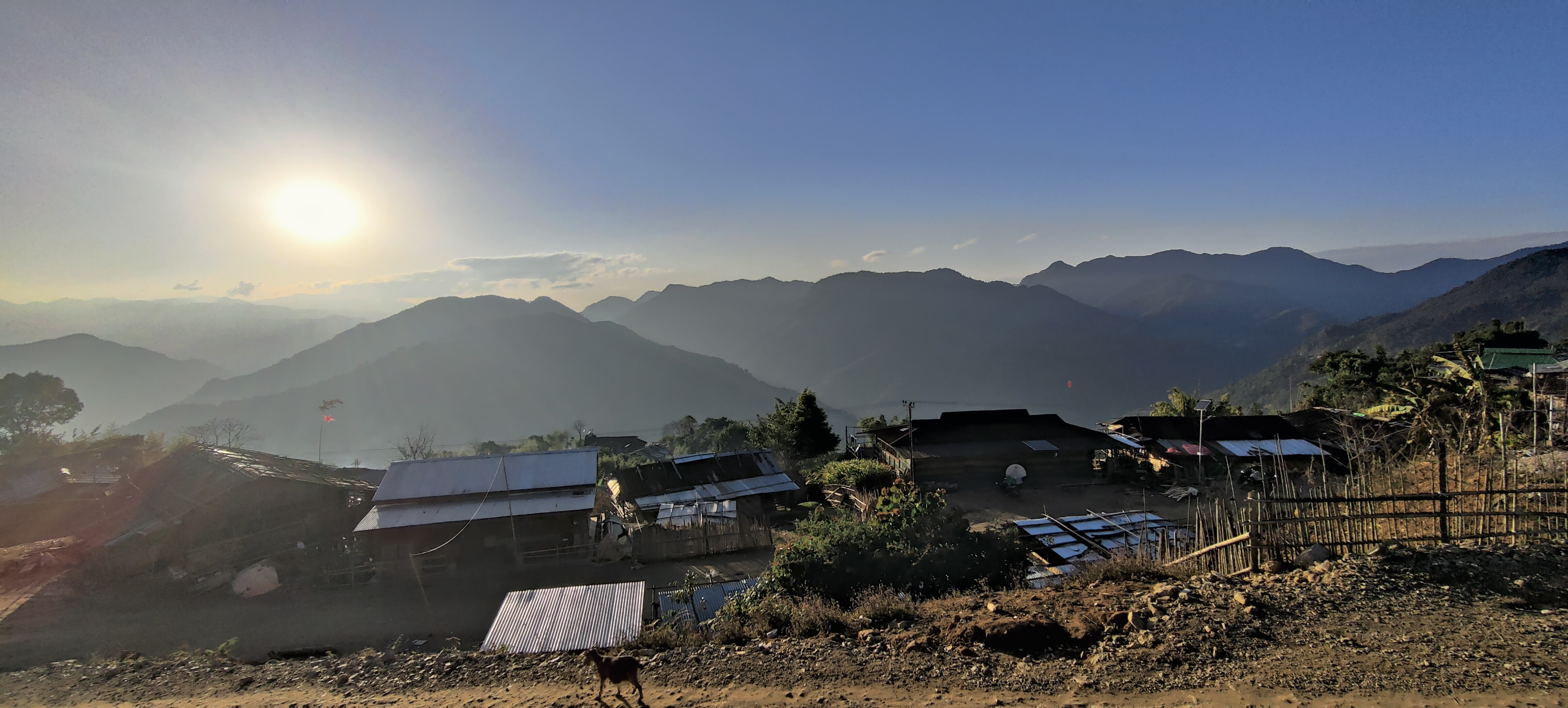
- Interactive map of Chambang
- Country: India
- State: Arunachal Pradesh
- District: Kra Daadi district

Government
  - Body: Kra Daadi District Administration
  - Deputy Commissioner: Higio Tala
  - ZPC: Charu Menia
  - MLA: Balo Raja
  - Additional Deputy Commissioner: Charu Nile

Languages
  - Official: English
- Time zone: UTC+5:30 (IST)
- Postal code: 791118
- ISO 3166 code: IN-AR
- Vehicle registration: AR-19

Chambang is an administrative and revenue block of Kra Daadi district in the state of Arunachal Pradesh. Also it is one of the administrative sub-unit comprising the 18-Palin assembly constituency.

The Circle Officer of Chambang circle (Equivalent SDM in other states in India) is the head of block administration and is assisted by various officers of development and work departments.

== Connectivity ==
Chambang is accessible by two motorways, with two more in progress. One of the operational road is from New Palin via Dari whose foundation stone was laid by the then Arunachal Pradesh Chief Minister Dorjee Khandu in Chambang in 2007 and other one from New Palin via Pania. The town has a helipad used only in rare circumstance.

== Drainage System ==
- Chatey flows through Chello village
- Peri flows through Rongte Rite village,
- Patee flows through Sangchang village and
- Kurung flows through several villages and clusters while flowing downstream and provides for daily household utilities, agriculture and fishing.

== Notable people ==
- Charu Tajuk, Director, Department of Printing, Government of Arunachal Pradesh)
- Charu Nile, APCS
- Charu Tayum, (Joint Director, Department of Transport, Government Of Arunachal Pradesh)
- Charu Menia Zilla Parishad Chairperson
