= Ali A:yé Lígang =

Indigenous festival in India

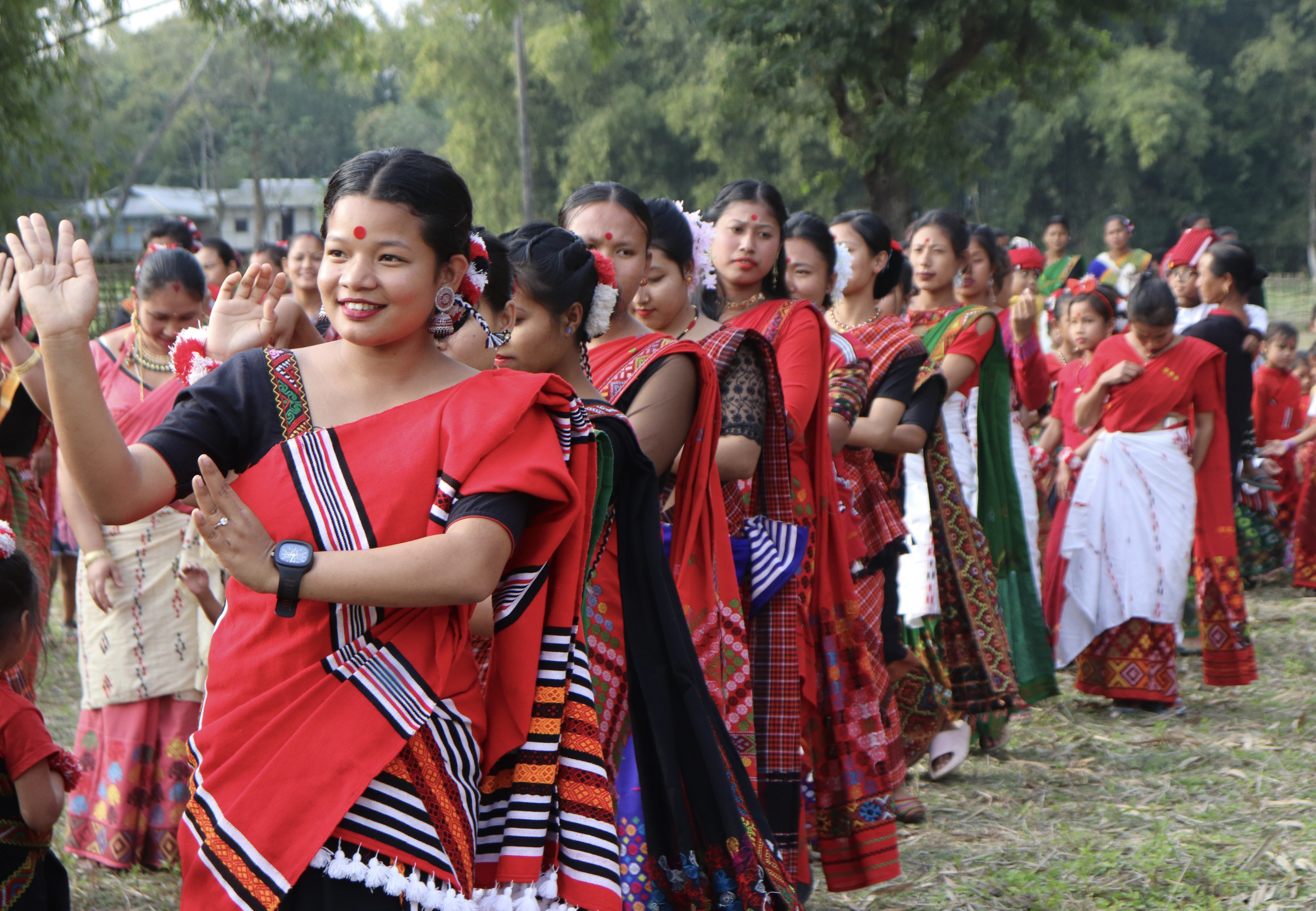
- Mising girls dancing during Ali Aye Ligang
- Begins: First Wednesday of Ginmur (a month of Mising calendar fall in mid of Month February)
- Frequency: Annually
- Locations: Assam, Arunachal Pradesh, India
- Organiser: Mising people

Mising community people celebrating Ali-Aye-Ligang

Ali A:yé Lígang a festival associated with agriculture, celebrated by the Mising people on the occasion of the beginning of the Ahu paddy cultivation. The festival marks onset of sowing seeds.

== Etymology ==
The name of the festival is made up of three terms: "ali" means legumes, "a:yé" - seed, and "lígang" means to sow. Meaning the season 'To sow legumes seeds'.

== Time of the festival ==
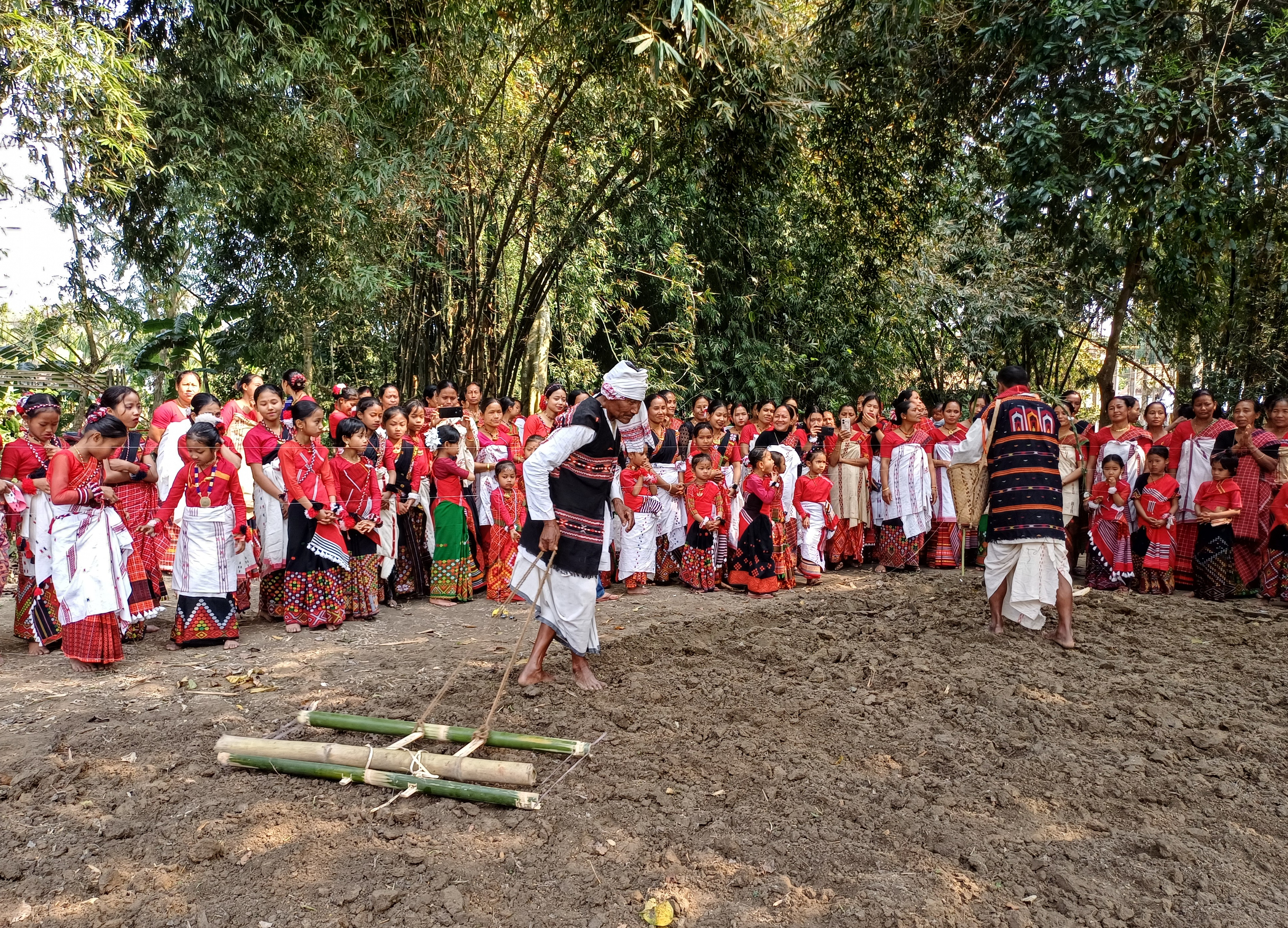
Ali Aye Ligang festival

The festival begins on "Ligange lange", the first Wednesday of "Gimur Polo", which occurs in February in the Gregorian calendar or on Wednesday of the month of Fagun of the Assamese calendar and in the month of February in English calendar which lasts for five days. Its 2016 date was 2 February.

== Celebration and activities ==
In this festival, young people of the community in particular participate Gumraag Soman and dance to the tune of folk songs and melodious Oi Nitom. The first day of the festival is marked by the ceremonial start of paddy sowing and throughout the festival many others activities such as ploughing and tree cutting are forbidden.

=== Feast ===
The last day of festival called as Lilen is observed with a grand community feast. During this festival, Misings indulge in great banquet with Po:ro Apong or Nogin Apong (homemade Rice beer) with various dishes, especially made with pork meat. Purang apin (packed boiled rice) a traditionally prepared dish is served during Ali A:yé Lígang.

=== Songs & music ===
The songs of Ali A:yé Lígang do not remain restricted to the songs of youth alone. The subjects and themes of the songs are varied. They include the life of a man, his sufferings in this life and his death. Apart from them, the songs describe the matters of individual love and affection including joy and pain. Mainly the songs of the festival speak of the various experiences of the Misings in their day-to-day life. The Music composed for these festivals consists of instruments like the dhul, taal, gong and gungang (gagana).

=== Dance forms ===
In this festival a popular dance is performed by the young Mising people which is known as "Gumrag". The formal dance of the festival starts from the easternmost house of the village. In the end, extending towards the field and the river. This dance is performed by encircling the courtyard of the house of the villagers.

== See also ==
- Porag
