= Palin, Arunachal Pradesh =

Palin
- City
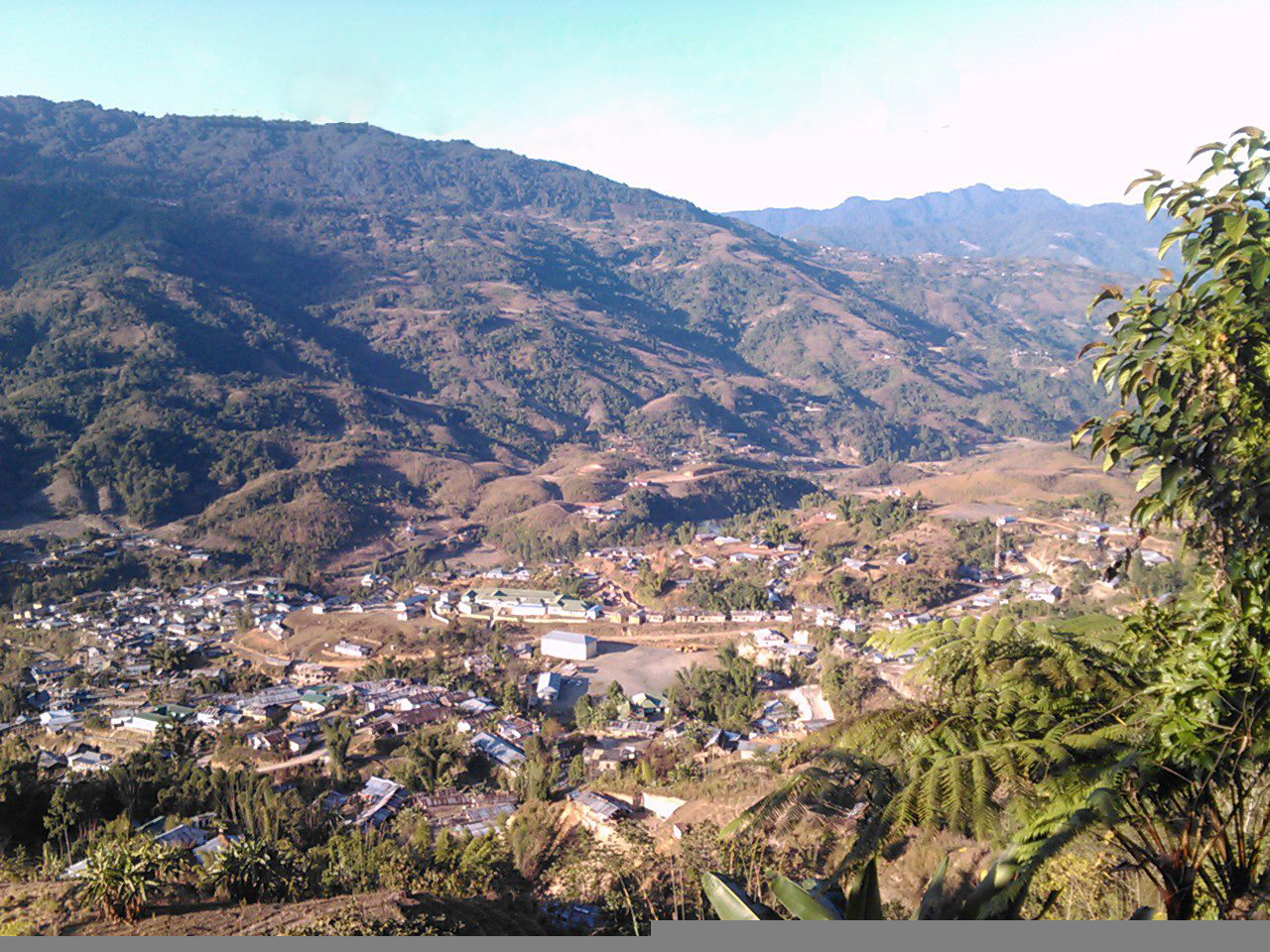
- A view of Palin

- Location within Arunachal Pradesh Location within India
- Coordinates: 27.694°N 93.632°E
- Country: India
- State: Arunachal Pradesh
- District: Kra Daadi district

Area
  - Total: 329.45 km^{2} (127.20 sq mi)
- Elevation: 1,080 m (3,540 ft)

Population (2011)
  - Total: 5,816
  - Density: 17/km^{2} (44/sq mi)

Languages
  - Official: English
- Time zone: UTC+5:30 (IST)
- Postal code: 791118
- ISO 3166 code: IN-AR
- Vehicle registration: AR-19

Palin is a hill station and the headquarter of Kra Daadi district in Arunachal Pradesh. It is inhabited by Nyishi tribe of Arunachal Pradesh and has a population of 5816 according to the 2001 census. The incumbent MLA from Palin constituency is Balo Raja.

== Geography ==
Palin has an average elevation of 1080 metres (3540 feet).

== Climate ==
Palin has a subtropical highland climate (Cwb in the Köppen climate classification). Summers are warm with very high rainfall; winters are mild with moderate rainfall. It is very hilly with high geographical terrain. Most of the time it is covered by clouds. The area is windy in nature.

Climate data for Palin
Month	Jan	Feb	Mar	Apr	May	Jun	Jul	Aug	Sep	Oct	Nov	Dec	Year
Mean daily maximum °C (°F)	15 (59)	15 (59)	17 (63)	20 (68)	20 (68)	23 (73)	22 (72)	24 (75)	23 (73)	22 (72)	19 (66)	16 (61)	20 (67)
Mean daily minimum °C (°F)	8 (46)	9 (48)	13 (55)	15 (59)	16 (61)	20 (68)	18 (64)	19 (66)	18 (64)	17 (63)	12 (54)	8 (46)	14 (58)
Average precipitation mm (inches)	30 (1.2)	54 (2.1)	57 (2.2)	96 (3.8)	210 (8.3)	405 (15.9)	510 (20.1)	360 (14.2)	411 (16.2)	114 (4.5)	15 (0.6)	27 (1.1)	2,289 (90.2)
Source: World Weather Online

== Culture ==
Palin and its adjoining areas are mainly populated by people of the Nyishi tribe.

Holy Rosary Church: Consecrated by the Bishop of Itanagar, this Catholic church reflects the extensive Christian influence.

== Places of interest ==
Holy Rosay Catholic Church is one of largest Catholic churches in the state. It is located at the hilltop in the town.

Palin river one of the tributaries of River Subansiri flows through this town. The river is ideal for rafting, fishing and for picnics.

From here tourist places like Ziro, Parshuram Kund (in Lohit), Malinithan (in Siang), Bhishmak Nagar (in Dibang Valley) are easily accessible by roads.

== Festivals ==
Nyokum, an agricultural festival of the Nyishis, is the main festival celebrated in the town. Beside Nyokum, people also celebrate Christmas, Diwali and Dusherra. Of late Longte Yullo festival is also being celebrated in Pain.

== Demography ==
As of 2001 India census, Palin has a population of 5816. The Nyishis are the indigenous inhabitants of the area. Some of the major clans inhabiting this constituency are Byabang, Dolang, Nangbia, Takam, Techi, Taring, Charu, Balo, Patey, Tarh, Techi, Taku, Khyoda, Dohu, Heri etc.

== Communication ==
Palin is situated in the western side of Arunachal Pradesh. From the capital city Itanagar it is The District Highway connects Palin to rest of the state. Regular Bus and Tata sumo services are available from Itanagar, Ziro.

== See also ==
- New Palin, a town in the Kurung Kumey district
- Yazali, Arunachal Pradesh
- Choba village
