= Pitang oying =

Traditional delicacy of the Mising people

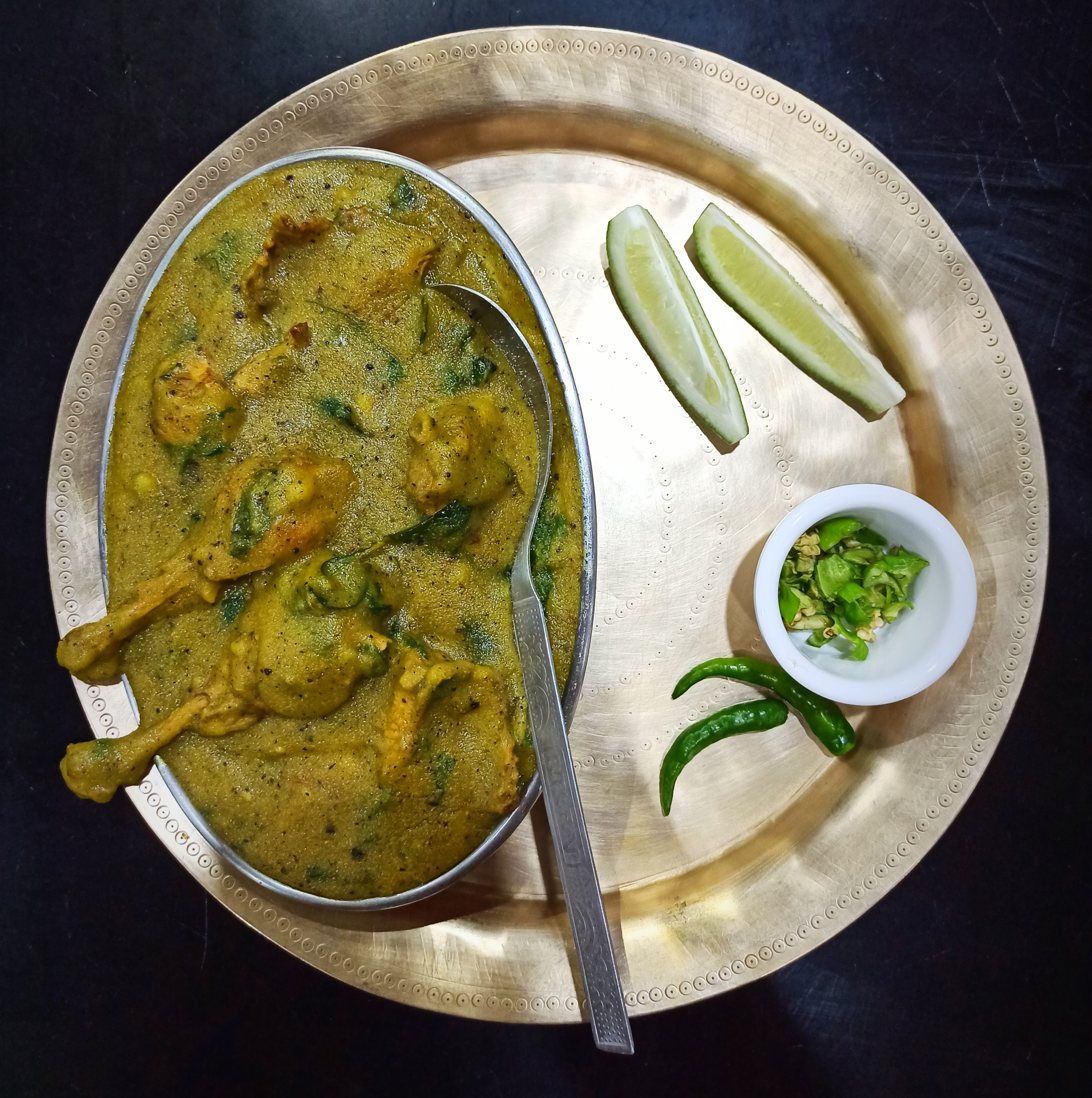
- Type: Chicken curry
- Place of origin: India
- Region or state: Assam
- Associated cuisine: Indian cuisine, Assamese cuisine

Pitang oying is a traditional delicacy of the Mising people. It is prepared by cooking chicken meat with flour. Literally "Pitang" means rice flour and the word "Oying" refers to curry. Collectively "Pitang Oying" means chicken cooked with flour.

== Ingredients ==
The main ingredients required to prepare Pitang oying are chicken meat and rice powder (flour). Any rice flour can be used except bora rice or sticky rice. Apart from these, common ingredients like mustard oil, onion, garlic, ginger, chillies, bay leaves, salt, pepper powder, turmeric etc. are also used here. Raw coriander and cloves can also be added to the dish.

== Procedure ==
Pitang oying is prepared in two ways. The first method involves frying the meat first using oil. The second method involves cooking the dish only by boiling it in water without the use of oil.

To make Pitang oying, the chicken is first cleaned and cut into small pieces. The rice is washed thoroughly after soaking it in water for some time. The rice is then ground into a cheap form. The meat is fried for some time by heating oil in a pan and adding onion, garlic and other ingredients. After this, the rice flour is slowly added to the boil and the meat is stirred. After adding salt, chillies, etc., to the measure, the pitang is cooked till it is cooked and finally chopped into raw coriander leaves and put down from the fire। It is usually served with Purang apin.

In many cases, pitang oying is cooked without the use of oil. In this method, water is boiled in a pan and the rice flour is added little by little. This is followed by the addition of chicken, salt, chillies, onions, garlic, vegetables etc. and boiled till cooked.

== Similar dishes ==
Apart from the Misings, there is a tradition among various tribes of Northeast India to cook indigenous chicken with flour. Pitang Oying is closely associated with dishes such as Daonohen Hon of the Dimasa people, Onla Jong Dao Dzong of the Boro people, and Amsu of the Ao tribe of the Naga people.
