= Apo (drink) =

Indian rice beer

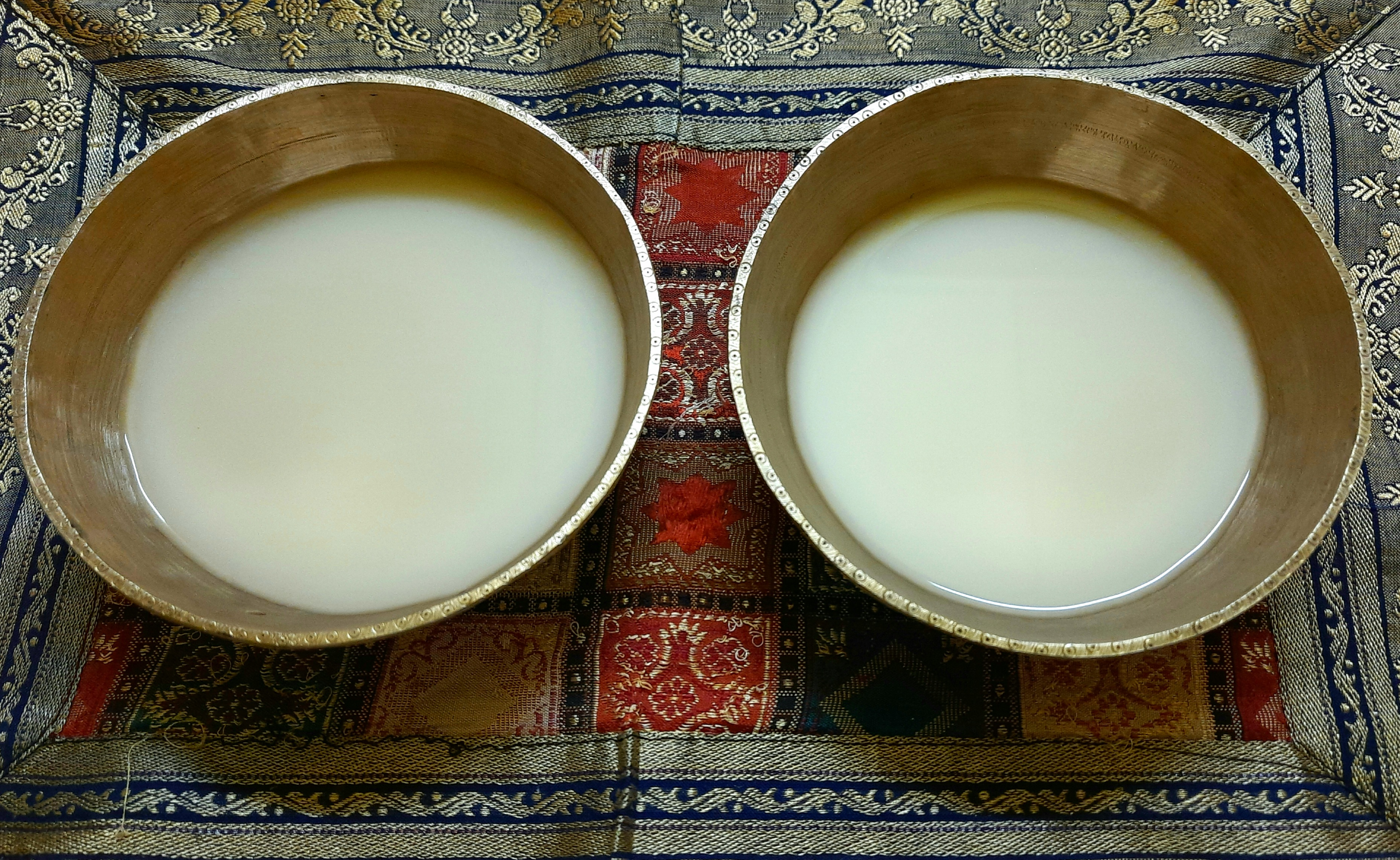
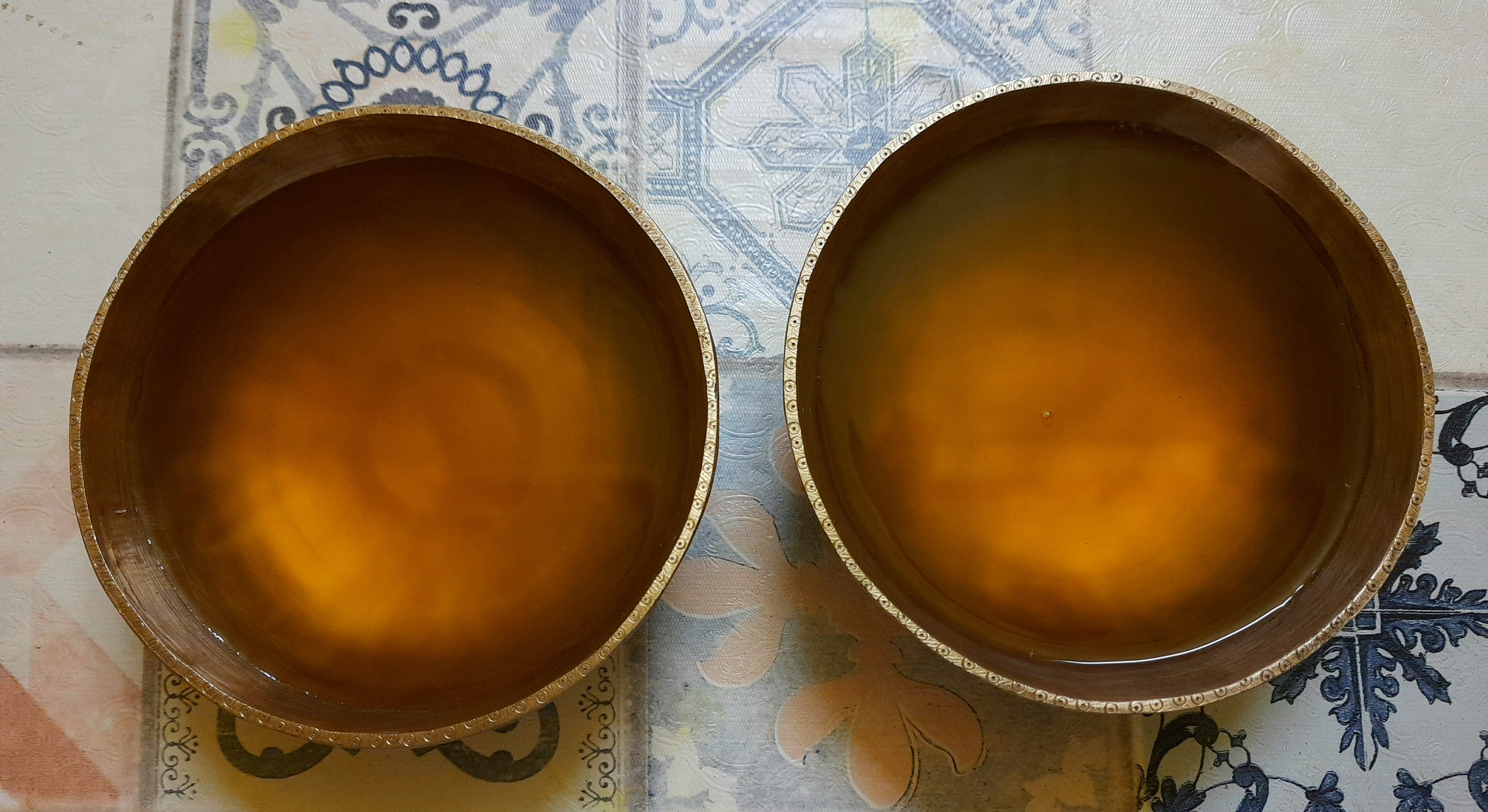
- Nogin apong (top) and Po:ro apong (below)
- Type: Rice wine
- Origin: Tibet Autonomous Region, North east India, Tibet Autonomous Region, Northeast India, Arunachal Pradesh and Assam
- Introduced: Mising people, Nyishi people, Galo people
- Ingredients: Fermentation of rice

Apo or apong is an alcohol drink prepared by fermentation of rice, commonly found among the Tani tribes in the Northeast India states of Arunachal Pradesh and Assam. Traditionally, there are two types of apo; Nogin apong and Poro apong. It is known by various names across different tribes in Arunachal Pradesh and Assam. It is commonly produced in households of northeastern states of Arunachal Pradesh and Assam in India. Although distinctive methods for brewing exist, the process of fermentation remains the same across these regions, inidicating common origins of brewing.

Many tribal communities of Arunachal Pradesh use apo during their respective festivals, such as nyokum. The tribal people offer the drink, every time they drink it, to the uiyu (spirits) by letting a few drops of it fall on the ground. Other occasions when Apo is served include annually organized ancestor worship ceremonies, the festivals of Ali aye ligang, Nyokum, Dree, and others, and annual agricultural programs.

Apo is known in different names across different tribes in North-Eastern India, such as haaz (Ahom), apong (Mising), zou (zu mai) (Bodo) and Sujen (Deori). Apo is not distributed in shops, as apo forms part of a tradition and culture, the apo is shared through generations like a piece of cultural knowledge. Apos are commonly brewed in households and often served along with rice and chutney as well, irrespective of gender or age differences.

== History ==
The origins of the apo tradition in the North-Eastern regions are not recorded, However, the tradition may date back to Neolithic period. Similarly, the word Apo is not a general term for a rice-based drink, as each tribe identifies the drink with different names. However, it is believed that the traditional rice beer was first developed by the 'Mising people in Assam. Thus the etymology of the word refers to its Mising language origins. Across the different tribes, the brewing method has certain differences, but the substrates used for fermentation are the same. This indicates a common ancestor to the brewing culture in North-Eastern India. Traditionally, two kinds of Apo are being brewed in these regions known as Po:ro Apong and Nogin Apong.

The starter cakes called épob are made out of crushed rice and medicinal plants are used to make the health quotient. These starter cakes are one of the most important elements of the rice beers made in the North-Eastern region, including Apo. This also refers to the idea of sacredness associated with the Apo making across different tribes as it is not made on an everyday basis, but only for ceremonies, festivals, marriage, and group gatherings. In this regard, historically and culturally, the Apo remains as an element of identity in these regions.

=== Apo and the Mising people ===
Apo is known in different traditional names based on the respective tribes. Apo is believed to be first developed by the Mising people in Assam. The term Apo is derived from the traditional name "Apong" in the Mising language. The Mising community is generally known for its passion for traditional cooking methods and food items. The cooking method of the Apo is also believed to be shared by the ancestors of Mising community and later spread throughout the tribes in North East India.

== Production ==
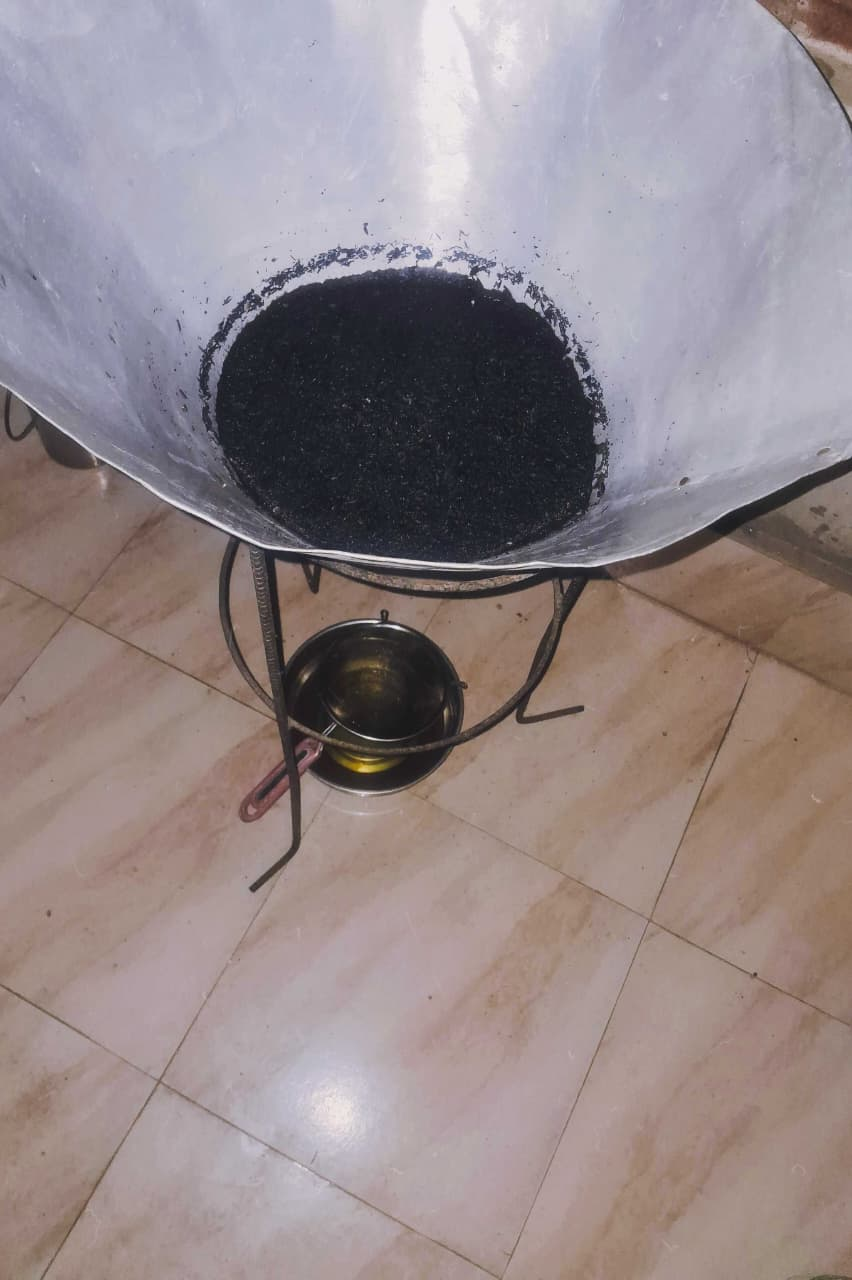
The fermentated epop mix is being filtered to make apong.

Apo is commonly produced in households of northeastern states of Arunachal Pradesh and Assam in India. Although distinctive methods for brewing exist across the North-Eastern region of India, the process of fermentation remains the same across these regions, indicating common origins of brewing.

As a first step, the rice collected for making beverage is cooked and then mixed with ash from burnt paddy sticks, which makes the mixture black. Once the rice is cooked, it is mixed with the fermenting ingredient E-Pob made out of rice and medicinal plants. Time is taken for the formation of ration changes along with the climate and temperature. During summer, the fermentation took 5–6 days. The fermented mixture is filtered and finally poured into bamboo shoots. During these processes, around 30 medicinal plants use to the beverage along with rice. This includes leaves, creepers, and grass. The total period taken for the production of Apo beer is more than 3 months. Although the alcohol content on the Apo is 18-25% it is more intoxicating in nature.

Recent studies indicate the Apo Beer can be economically benefiting the community as the beer provides the entrepreneurial potential to the community as the rice beer produced in Northeast regions, including Apo are high quality in nature.

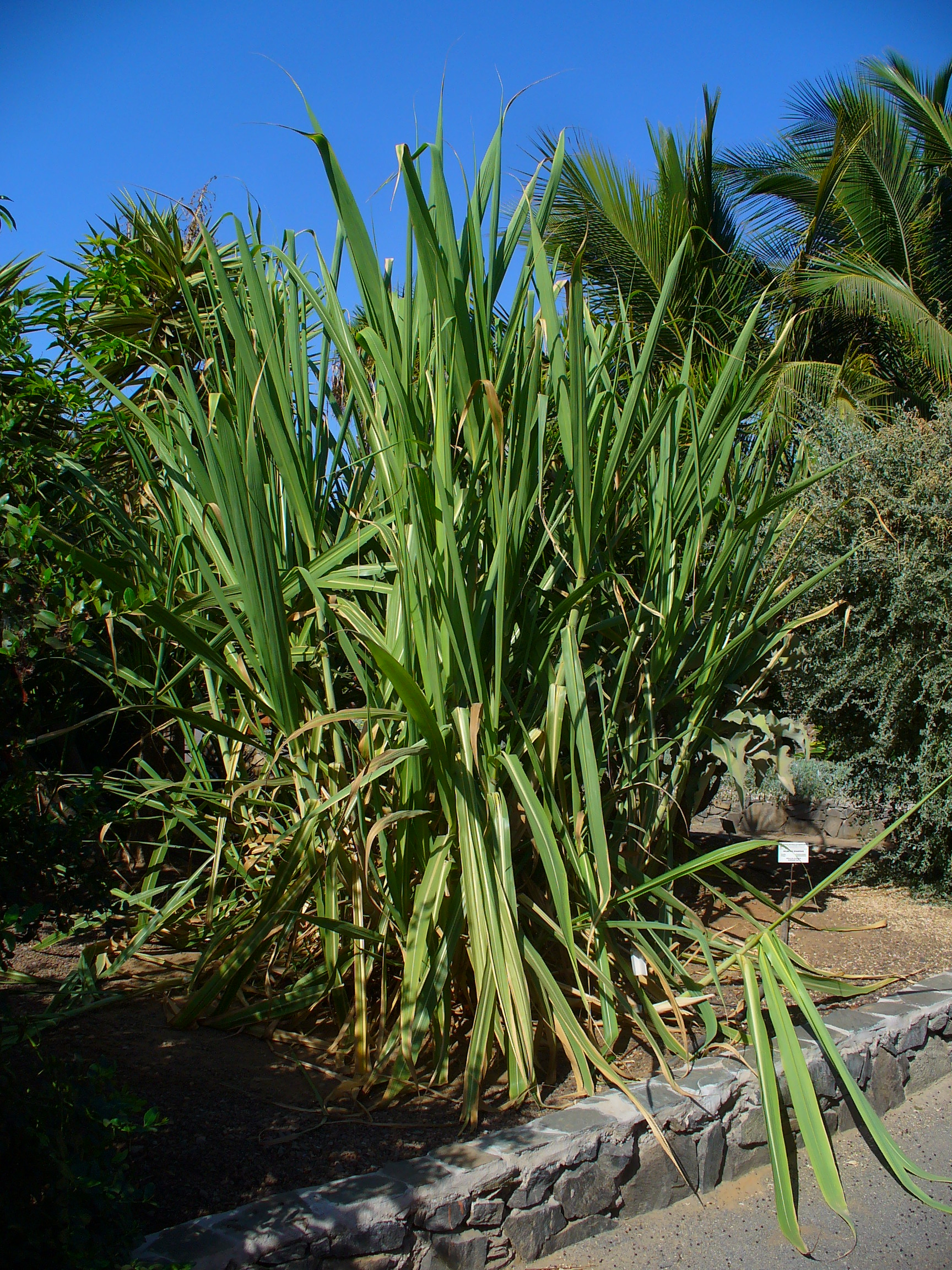
Plants such as Saccharum Officinarum are used in the production of Apo beer.

=== The Épob (starter cake) ===
The starter cake is one of the most indispensable elements of the Apo beer production process. The Apo beer produced by the Mising community is identified to have various medicinal and therapeutic properties as a result often used during the preparation of starter cake known as épob. The beer-making process in each tribe varies according to the environmental factors and other socio-cultural practices associated with the individual tribes. These factors are essential in determining the colour, flavour, and sweetness of the flower. One major process during the production of Apong is the use of starter cake, i.e. épob which has significant medicinal qualities. This quality is of starter cake is determined by the medicinal plants used during the production along with the sanitary conditions used while making the beer. The making of épob in this regard include the process of collecting a variety of medicinal plant leaves. The leaves collected are dried placing it on a bamboo mat known as époh after cleaning it. Fresh leaves can also be used for making the starter cake for making the beer. The leaves are later ground separately using a wooden tool hand mixer together to make an épob in the shape of oval-shaped balls from the dough made from the mixture. Kuhiar (Saccharum officinarum), senikuthi (Scoparia dulcis), bhilongoni (Cyclosorus exlensa), anaras (pineapple, also known as Ananas comosus), bam kolmou (Ipomoea species), kopou dhekia, lexuosum Lygodium flexuosum, lai jabori (Drymaria cordata), horumanimuni (Hydrocotyle sibthorpioides jalokia (Capsicum annuum), dhapat tita (Clerodendrum viscosum), bormanimuni (Centella asiatica) etc. are some of the most basic medicinal plants and herbs used for the making of épob.

=== Folk medicine ===
The folk medicine beliefs of the starter cake derive from the use of local herbs. Tribes believe that the combination of herbs makes Apo beer an effective agent against various minor diseases. Most of the plants used for the preparation of the beer are indigenous. The varieties of Apo beer in the northeast region of India include methods of infusion and decoction used by the local peoples.

== Cultural significance ==
Apo is an important element in the socio-cultural aspect of the Mising people. The Apo beer is served during religious festivals and ceremonies in Assam such as Marriages, death ceremonies, Ali A:yé Lígang, Porag, and other major community gatherings and celebration. Apong is usually served along with pork and Purang apin in festivals like Ali A:yé Lígang.

== Local economy ==
In local markets, Apo beer is a source of income and livelihood for many families, and contributes to community development.

In Assam, it has been reportedly found to be sold by local brewers in small bottles. In the recent years commercial bottled version of the traditional liquor have also beans launched in Assam and Arunachal Pradesh under other names.

== In popular culture ==
Apo was featured in the Indian Amazon Prime Video web series The Family Man (season 3), where it is depicted as a traditional rice-based alcoholic beverage consumed in Northeast India.

== See also ==
- List of rice beverages
- Rice wine
