= Palin Assembly constituency =

Constituency of the Arunachal Pradesh legislative assembly in India

Coordinates: 26.790°N 95.434°E

Palin
- Constituency No. 18 for the Arunachal Pradesh Legislative Assembly

Constituency details
- Country: India
- Region: Northeast India
- State: Arunachal Pradesh
- District: Kra Daadi
- Lok Sabha constituency: Arunachal East
- Established: 1978
- Total electors: 17,368
- Reservation: ST

Member of Legislative Assembly
- 11th Arunachal Pradesh Legislative Assembly
- Incumbent Balo Raja
- Party: Bharatiya Janata Party
- Elected year: 2019

Palin is one of the 60 assembly constituencies of Arunachal Pradesh, a northeastern state of India. It is part of Arunachal East Lok Sabha constituency.

== Members of the Legislative Assembly ==
Year	Member	Party
1978	Sutem Tasung	People's Party of Arunachal
1990	Dugi Tajik	Janata Dal
1995	Takam Sanjoy	Janata Dal
1999	Takam Sanjoy	Indian National Congress
2004	Balo Raja	Bharatiya Janata Party
2009	Takam Pario	People's Party of Arunachal
2014	Takam Pario	Indian National Congress
2019	Balo Raja	Bharatiya Janata Party
2024	Balo Raja	Bharatiya Janata Party

== Election results ==
=== Assembly Election 2024 ===
2024 Arunachal Pradesh Legislative Assembly election : Palin
Party	Candidate	Votes	%	±%
BJP	Balo Raja	10,029	65.19%	▲20.22
NPP	Mayu Taring	4,989	32.43%	New
INC	Tarh Johny	295	1.92%	▼37.32
NOTA	None of the Above	71	0.46%	▼0.39
Margin of victory		5,040	32.76%	▲27.03
Turnout		15,384	88.58%	▲1.76
Registered electors		17,368		▲18.39
BJP hold		Swing	▲20.22	

=== Assembly Election 2019 ===
2019 Arunachal Pradesh Legislative Assembly election : Palin
Party	Candidate	Votes	%	±%
BJP	Balo Raja	5,727	44.97%	New
INC	Takam Pario	4,997	39.24%	New
JD(U)	Byabang Taj	1,904	14.95%	New
NOTA	None of the Above	108	0.85%	New
Margin of victory		730	5.73%	
Turnout		12,736	86.82%	▲86.82
Registered electors		14,670		▲5.78
BJP gain from INC		Swing		

=== Assembly Election 2014 ===
2014 Arunachal Pradesh Legislative Assembly election : Palin
Party	Candidate	Votes	%	±%
INC	Takam Pario	Unopposed		
Registered electors		13,868		▲7.35
INC gain from PPA		Swing		

=== Assembly Election 2009 ===
2009 Arunachal Pradesh Legislative Assembly election : Palin
Party	Candidate	Votes	%	±%
PPA	Takam Tagar	6,015	52.68%	New
INC	Balo Raja	5,326	46.65%	▲1.02
NCP	Charu Tanam	77	0.67%	New
Margin of victory		689	6.03%	▼2.71
Turnout		11,418	88.38%	▲15.83
Registered electors		12,919		▼8.09
PPA gain from BJP		Swing		

=== Assembly Election 2004 ===
2004 Arunachal Pradesh Legislative Assembly election : Palin
Party	Candidate	Votes	%	±%
BJP	Balo Raja	5,545	54.37%	New
INC	Takam Sanjoy	4,653	45.63%	▼37.30
Margin of victory		892	8.75%	▼57.96
Turnout		10,198	72.37%	▲3.30
Registered electors		14,056		▲24.74
BJP gain from INC		Swing		

=== Assembly Election 1999 ===
1999 Arunachal Pradesh Legislative Assembly election : Palin
Party	Candidate	Votes	%	±%
INC	Takam Sanjoy	6,471	82.93%	▲43.03
NCP	Charu Tuglo	1,266	16.22%	New
Margin of victory		5,205	66.71%	▲48.68
Turnout		7,803	71.41%	▼1.67
Registered electors		11,268		▲13.67
INC gain from JD		Swing		

=== Assembly Election 1995 ===
1995 Arunachal Pradesh Legislative Assembly election : Palin
Party	Candidate	Votes	%	±%
JD	Takam Sanjoy	4,072	57.92%	▲15.19
INC	Dugi Tajik	2,805	39.90%	▲6.50
BJP	Taring Ranjeev	135	1.92%	New
Margin of victory		1,267	18.02%	▲8.69
Turnout		7,030	72.01%	▲11.85
Registered electors		9,913		▼0.42
JD hold		Swing		

=== Assembly Election 1990 ===
1990 Arunachal Pradesh Legislative Assembly election : Palin
Party	Candidate	Votes	%	±%
JD	Dugi Tajik	2,513	42.74%	New
INC	Dolang Taging	1,964	33.40%	New
JP	Taring Ranjeev	769	13.08%	▼10.44
Independent	Pate Tatung	634	10.78%	New
Margin of victory		549	9.34%	▼27.08
Turnout		5,880	60.57%	▼19.84
Registered electors		9,955		▼3.08
JD gain from PPA		Swing	▼17.20	

=== Assembly Election 1978 ===
1978 Arunachal Pradesh Legislative Assembly election : Palin
Party	Candidate	Votes	%	±%
PPA	Sutem Tasung	4,857	59.93%	New
JP	Tarung Pabia	1,906	23.52%	New
Independent	Opang Moyong	1,341	16.55%	New
Margin of victory		2,951	36.41%	
Turnout		8,104	80.90%	
Registered electors		10,271		
PPA win (new seat)				

== See also ==
- Palin
- Kra Daadi district
- List of constituencies of Arunachal Pradesh Legislative Assembly
