= New Palin =

New Palin Hinda
- Town
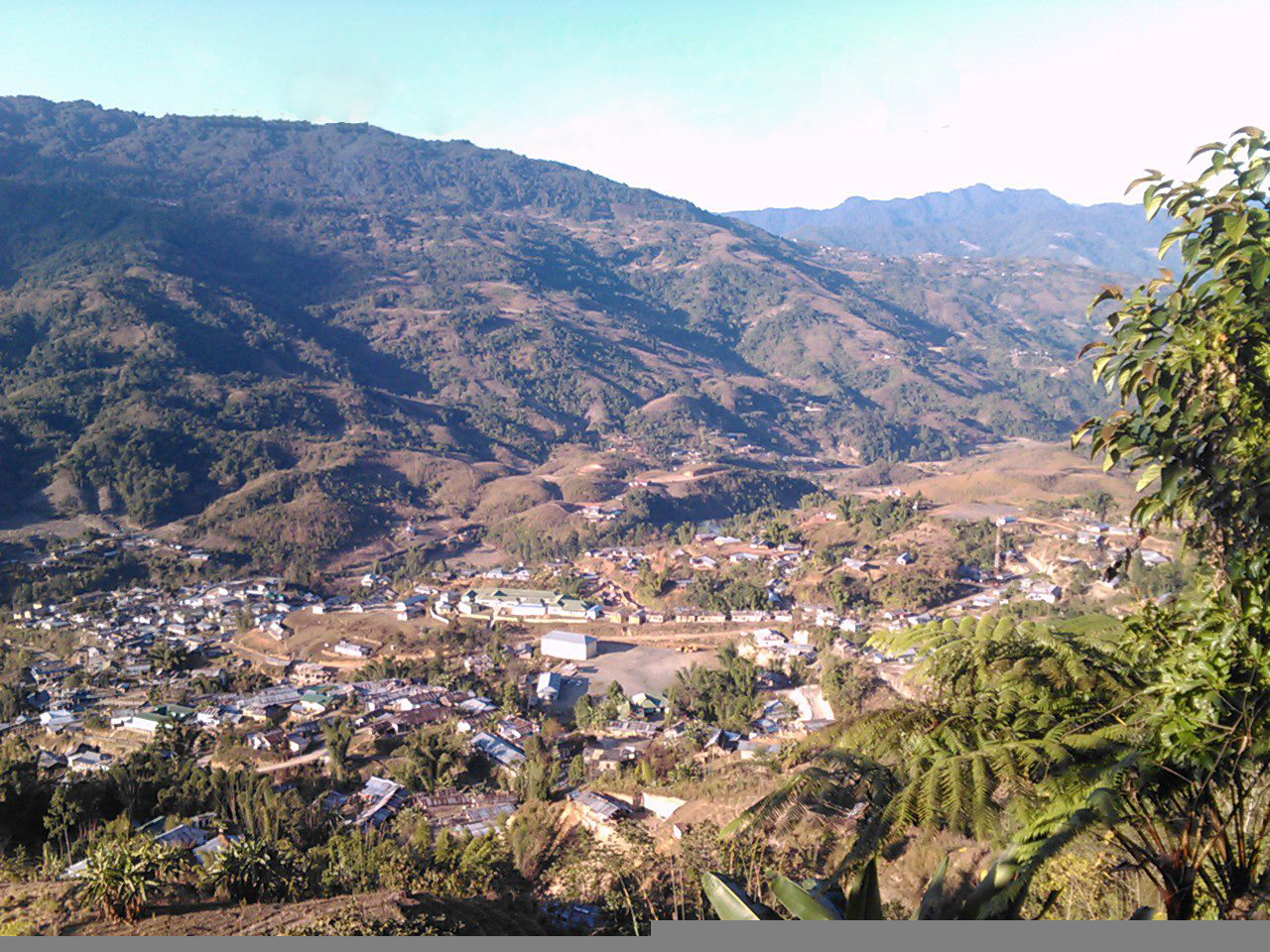
- A view of Palin

- Location within Arunachal Pradesh Location within India
- Coordinates: 27.70389°N 93.69101°E
- Country: India
- State: Arunachal Pradesh
- District: Kra Daadi
- Elevation: 1,080 m (3,540 ft)

Population (2011)
  - Total: 11,251

Languages
  - Official: English
- Time zone: UTC+5:30 (IST)
- Postal code: 791118
- ISO 3166 code: IN-AR
- Vehicle registration: AR 19

New Palin is a town in the Kra Daadi district of Arunachal Pradesh and camp office of the district Administration of Kra Daadi district. Inhabited by Nyishi tribe, it is the largest town of the Kra Daadi District.

== Location and 2011 population ==
It is located at Latitude 28.15285, Longitude 94.12288. It has a population of 9896 as per 2011 census.

== Geography ==
New Palin is located at 27.0738°N 93.6145°E. It has an average elevation of 1080 metres (3540 feet).

== Climate ==
Palin falls within 15' to 20' temperature zone; often the temperature falls to 5–7 °C in winter. The region is very cold during winter and very hot during summer. Rainfall is very high due to very hilly and high geographical terrain. Most of time it is covered by clouds. The area is windy in nature.

Climate data for Palin
Month	Jan	Feb	Mar	Apr	May	Jun	Jul	Aug	Sep	Oct	Nov	Dec	Year
Mean daily maximum °C (°F)	15 (59)	15 (59)	17 (63)	20 (68)	20 (68)	23 (73)	22 (72)	24 (75)	23 (73)	22 (72)	19 (66)	16 (61)	20 (67)
Mean daily minimum °C (°F)	8 (46)	9 (48)	13 (55)	15 (59)	16 (61)	20 (68)	18 (64)	19 (66)	18 (64)	17 (63)	12 (54)	8 (46)	14 (58)
Average precipitation mm (inches)	30 (1.2)	54 (2.1)	57 (2.2)	96 (3.8)	210 (8.3)	405 (15.9)	510 (20.1)	360 (14.2)	411 (16.2)	114 (4.5)	15 (0.6)	27 (1.1)	2,289 (90.2)
Source: World Weather Online

== Culture ==
Palin and its adjoining areas are mainly populated by people of the Nyishi tribe.

Holy Rosary church: Consecrated by the Bishop of Itanagar, this Christian catholic church reflects the extensive Christian influence and provides good views of Palin and the surrounding countryside.

== Places of interest ==
Holy Rosary Catholic Church is one of the largest Catholic Churches in the state. It is located at a hilltop in the town.

Palin river one of the tributaries of Subansiri flows through this town. The river is ideal for rafting, fishing and picnic and outings alike.

== Education ==
Government Model College, Nangbia District’s first college.

Govt Hr. Sec. School Palin, Established in 1957 is a public institution supported by government of Arunachal Pradesh and affiliated to CBSE, New Delhi.

Don Bosco School, Kasturba Gandhi Balika Vidyalaya(Lumba), Jawahar Navodaya Vidyalaya,(Lumba).

There are various other private schools offering education up to upper primary level.

== Festivals ==
Nyokum is the main festival celebrated in the town. Besides Nyokum, residents also celebrate Christmas with overwhelming enthusiasm.

== Demography ==
As of 2011 India census, Palin has a population of 11251. The Nyishis are the aborigines of the area. Vast majority of denizens of the town are christian.

== Telecommunication and road Connectivity ==
The District Highway connects Palin to the other parts of the state. Uninterrupted Bus and Tata sumo services are available from Naharlagun, Itanagar and Ziro regularly. BSNL is the first network that was set up in 2008 but as of June 2017 telecom networks that provides services are Airtel, Vodafone and BSNL.

== See also ==
- Palin, Arunachal Pradesh
- Yazali, Arunachal Pradesh
