= Yingkiong =

- Town
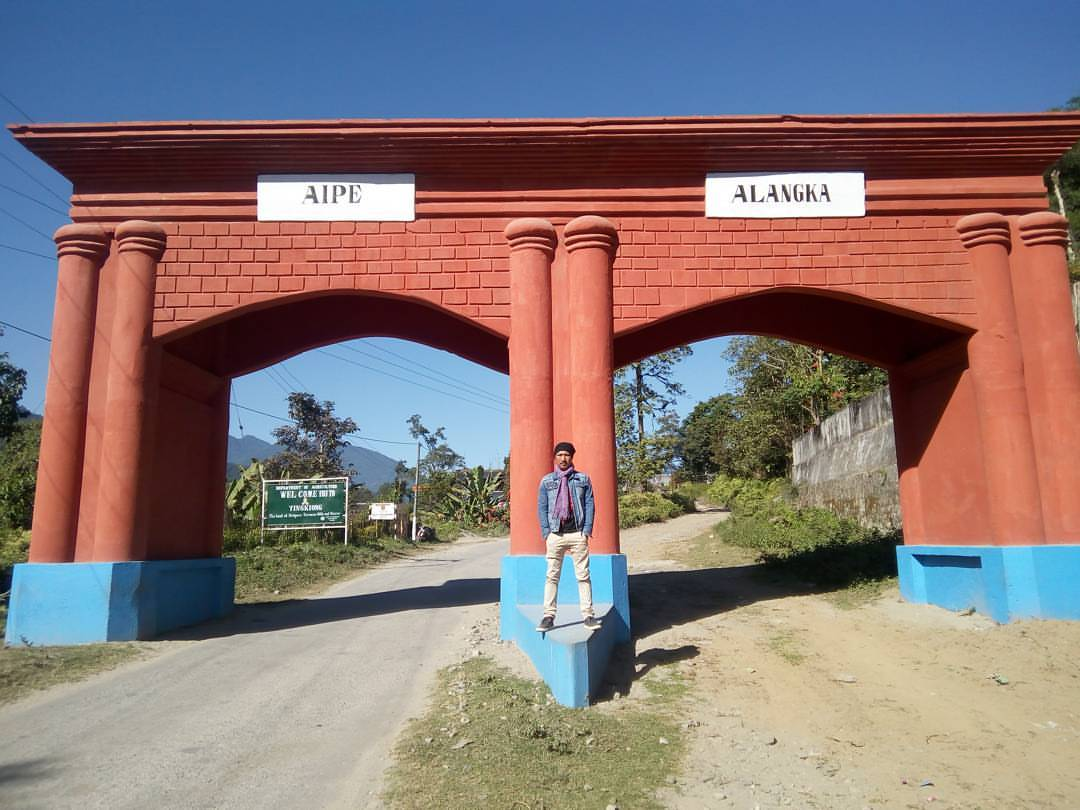
- Welcome Gate, Yingkiong

- Location in Arunachal Pradesh, India Yingkiong (India)
- Coordinates: 28.61037°N 95.047531°E
- Country: India
- State: Arunachal Pradesh
- Established: 1999
- Elevation: 450 m (1,480 ft)

Population (2011)
  - Total: 6,540
- Time zone: UTC+5:30 (IST)
- Postal code: 791002
- Vehicle registration: AR-14
- Website: uppersiang.nic.in

Yingkiong is a town in and the administrative headquarters of Upper Siang district in the Northeast Indian state of Arunachal Pradesh. It is located 250 kilometres (160 mi) north of Itanagar, the capital of the state, and 1 kilometre (0.62 miles) east of the River Siang. According to the 2011 Census, the town has a total population of 8,573.

== History ==
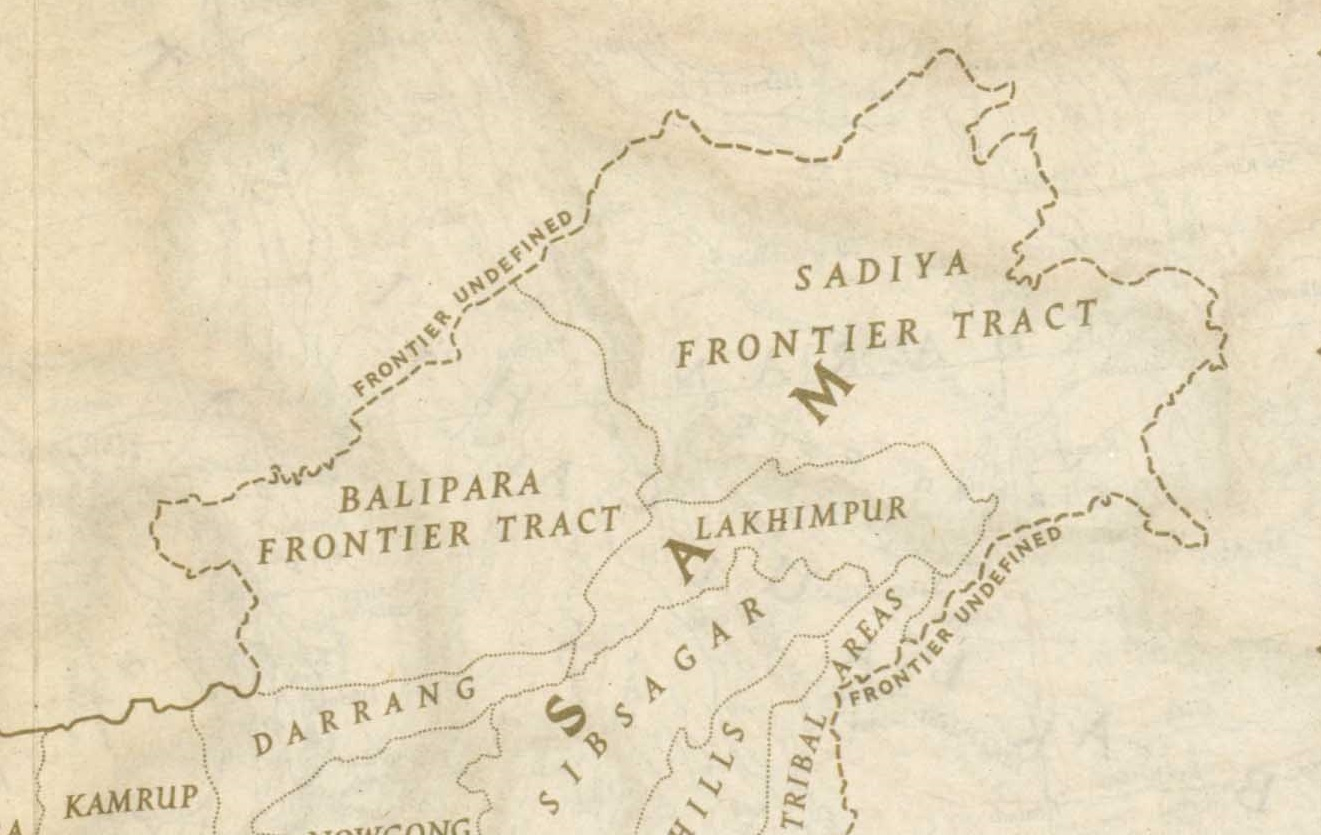
Map of the North-East Frontier Tracts in 1946; Yinkiong was in the Sadiya Frontier Tract

In 1911, following the Anglo–Abor wars, the British gained administrative control of the Upper Siang region. It was put under the administrative control of the Assistant Political Officer stationed at Sadiya (in Assam) during the period. Some notable British civil servants who held the role of Assistant Political Officer included Jack Francis Needham, appointed in 1882, and Noel Williamson, who was assassinated by the villagers of Komsing in the present day East Siang district.

After the independence of India, the region was part of the East Siang district until 1995, when it was separated for administrative convenience and made an independent district, northwest of Pasighat.

== Geography ==
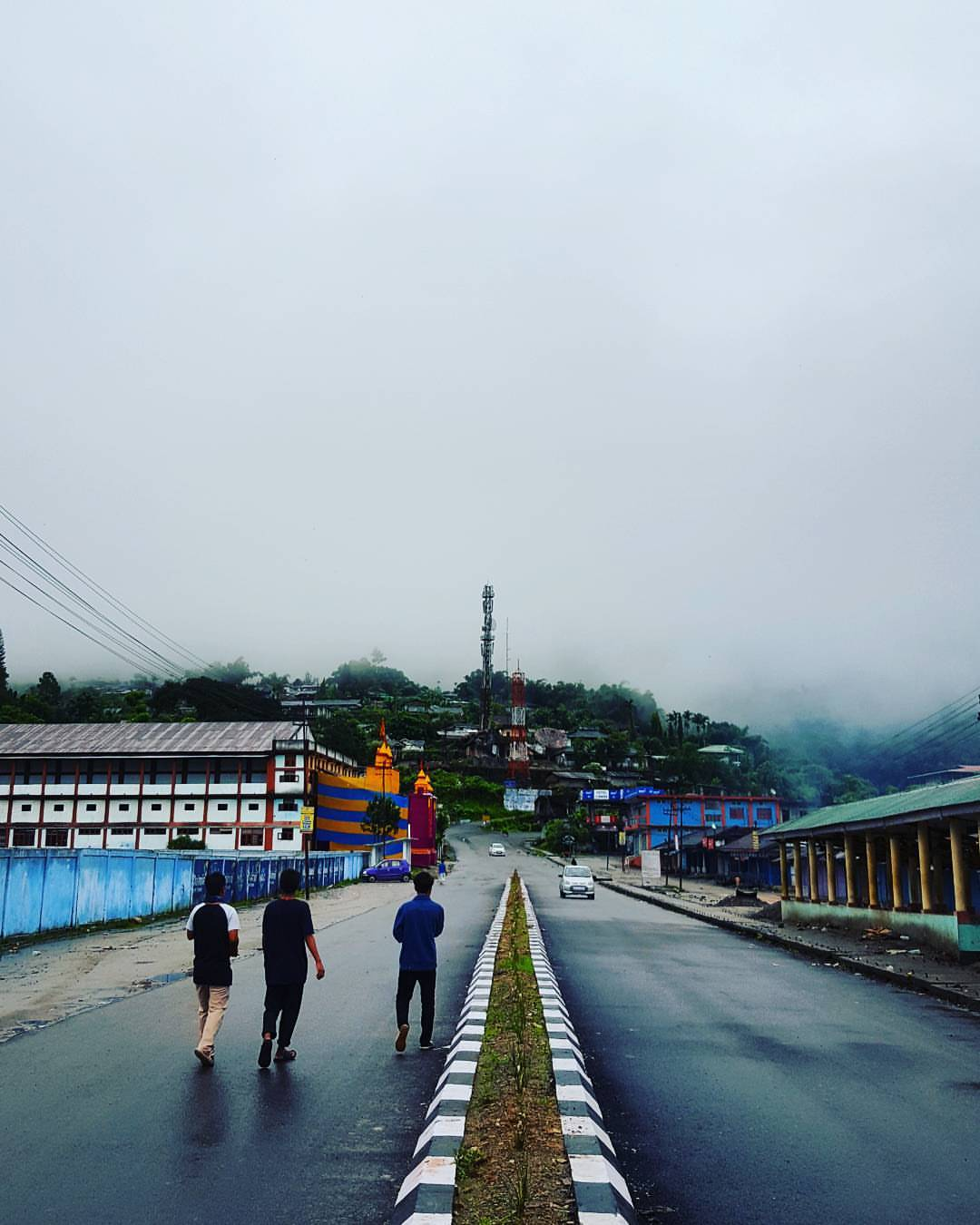
View of (NH-513) Yingkiong

Yingkiong is on the eastern bank of the Siang River (later known as Brahmaputra River). The town is at an elevation of 400 m (1,300 ft) to 500 m (1,600 ft)above sea level. Tuting, Singging, and Bishing are towns north of Yingkiong, geographically close to the Indo-China border. Simong, Gobuk, Puging, Pangkang, Gette, Moying, Bomdo, Likor, and Millang are some of the villages and hamlets that surround Yingkiong.

National Highway 513 (NH-513) connects Yingkiong to Pasighat at the foothills of Himalayas.

== Climate ==
Yingkiong has a relatively warm and humid subtropical climate. The highest recorded temperature in Yingkiong is 39 °C during summer, and 4 °C in winter. The highest recorded annual rainfall of Yingkiong is 3,116 mm. The higher parts of the town receive snowfall for most of the year.

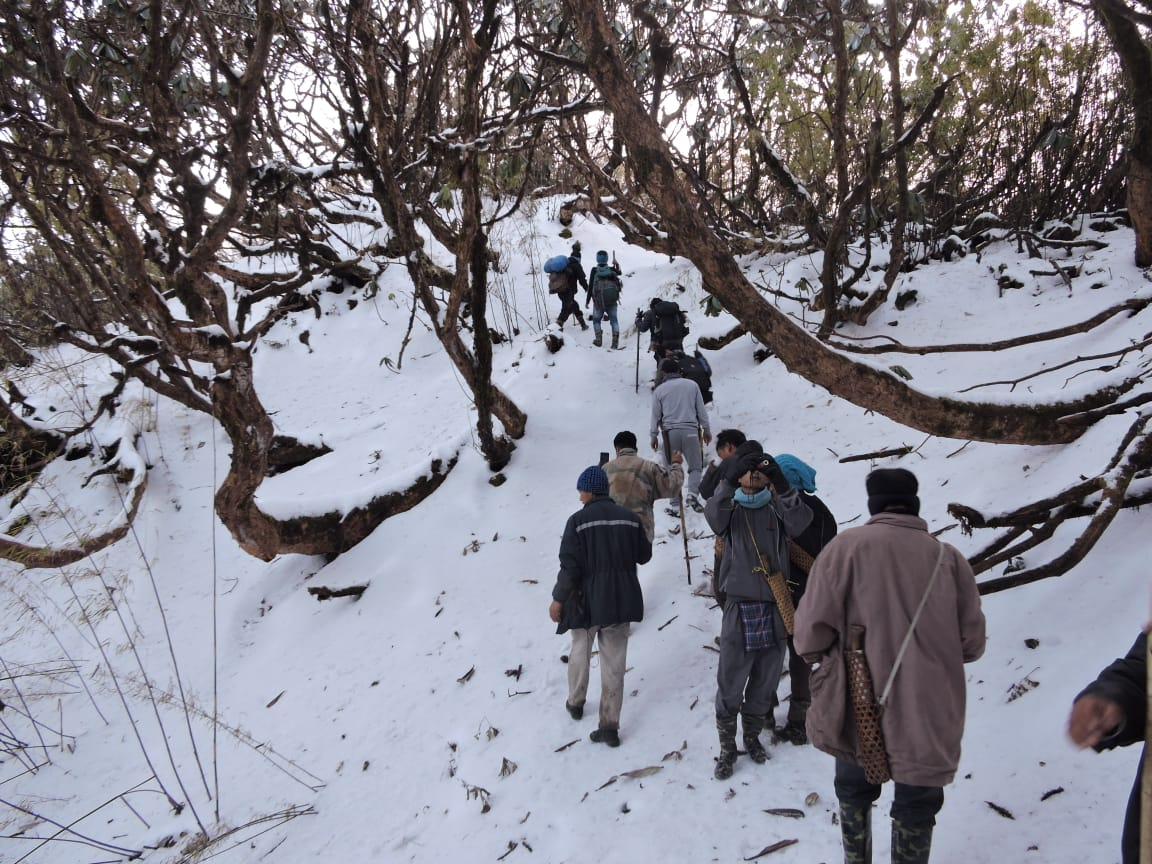
Villagers trekking to upper region of Yingkiong town covered with snow for a major period of the year.

== Economy ==
The majority of Yingkiong people are subsistence farmers. Fruit and vegetable cultivation for commercial sale is endorsed by local administration through MIDH (Mission For Integrated Development of Horticulture), a centrally-sponsored scheme of the Ministry of Agriculture and Farmers' Welfare. Of the 69 per cent of households engaged in agriculture in Upper Siang, the Yingkiong township has the highest number of urban agrarian households.

Jhum cultivation (slash and burn) and terrace farming are the most common farming techniques. Rice, maize, and millet are the main food crops. Cash crops like turmeric and sugarcane are commonly grown.

Cultivation of seasonal fruits like oranges and pineapple is common, and during periods of favourable cultivation and surplus output, they are transported in bulk for sale in local markets or outside the town in Pasighat. Pisciculture is also common and is promoted under a centrally sponsored FFDA (Fish Farmer Development Agency) programme to generate employment for locals and revenue for the state.

A variety of black tea called Siang Tea is made at the Deki Tea estate in Ramsing Village for export and domestic consumption.

Handicrafts such as woven bamboo stools known as murha are often seen. The Adi tribe are known for making a distinct type of traditional basket called egin, which is used frequently by the locals to carry household items like rice, dried wood, and other edibles or farm products.

== Demographics ==
According to the 2011 Census of India, the town had a population of 6,540: there were 3,364 males and 3,176 females. About 61 percent of the population belongs to Scheduled Tribes (mainly Adi people).

The literacy rate of the region is 64%. The female literacy rate is 44.89% and the male literacy rate is 55%.

Adi is the primary dialect spoken in the area. Hindi is commonly used as a lingua franca.

== Culture ==
=== Festivals ===
The locals of Yingkiong celebrate the Solung, Aran (Unying-Aran), Etor, Siang River Darshan, and Mopin festivals.

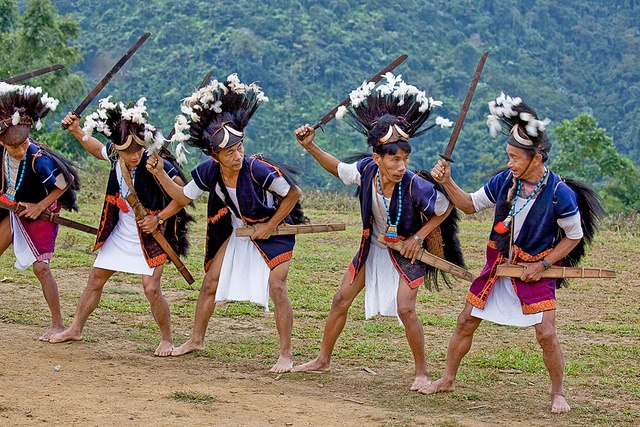
Tapu (a typical aggressive posturing by male members of Adi tribe) during Aran festival staging the war cry dance during actual tribe wars done as a 'warm up' before the real armed conflict.

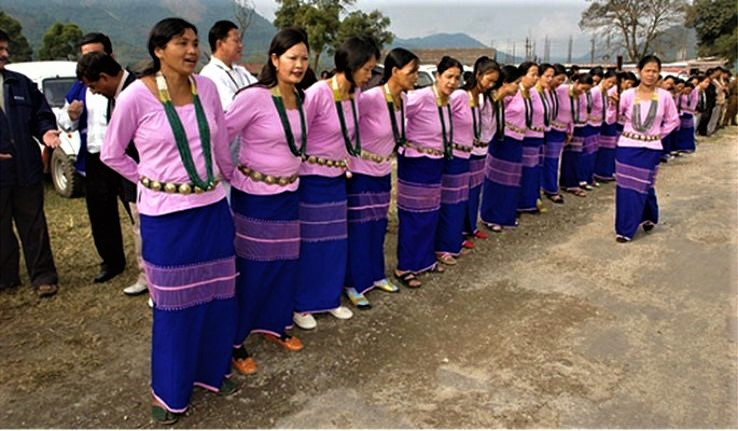
Tribal women performing traditional welcome dance (Ponung) as a part of Siang River festival.

- The Solung festival revolves around agriculture and celebrates good harvest. The festival is generally celebrated mid-August–September: a proper date for the festival is fixed by a village council called the kebang or by the gam (village headman) each year. On the day of the festival, villagers prepare apong (local rice wine). Fresh vegetables and meats are stored for the occasion.
- Aran (Unying Aran) is a new year festival of the Adi community celebrated in the districts of East and Upper Siang. It marks the arrival of the spring. During the festival, male elders of the village perform the Bari dance, and young boys and girls perform the Yakjong dance, which narrate the origins of the festival. They also pray for the good health and prosperity of the people.
- The Etor festival is celebrated on May 15 by Adi tribes in East and Upper Siang. Etor means 'fencing' in local dialect and therefore it is related to the protection of crops by fencing the cultivated lands and protecting gayal (Mithun) inside large fields. A huge feast is held and offerings are made to deities. Etor marks the beginning of the annual agricultural cycle of the community.
- The Siang River festival was previously known as the Brahmaputra Darshan Festival. After 2005, Yingkiong, Tuting, and Pasighat were chosen as the places to conduct the festival.

== Transport ==
The town is connected to the rest of the country and Arunachal Pradesh via National Highway 513 (NH-513) and NH-52 from Pasighat (126 km) to Itanagar (392 km). Modes of transport include taxi and Arunachal Pradesh State Transport bus services.

In January 2019, Byorung Bridge, a 300-meter long cable stayed suspension foot-bridge, was constructed over the Siang river . The bridge connects the town of Tuting on the eastern bank to the road to Tuting-Gelling on the western bank, reducing 40 km in travel distance for 20,000 residents of nearby villages.

Earlier aerial connectivity was limited to Mohanbari Airport in Dibrugarh. In 2018, Pasighat Airport was built and made operational in Pasighat town, which is currently the nearest airport to reach Yingkiong. There is direct aerial connectivity to Yingkiong through the helicopter services that are available from Pasighat, Itanagar, and Assam. There are two heliports in the town: one near Siang and the other across from the District Collector office in Yingkiong that facilitates helicopter landing services.

The nearest railway station is 165 km south at Murkongselek in the Jonai District of Assam, connecting Yingkiong via Pasighat.

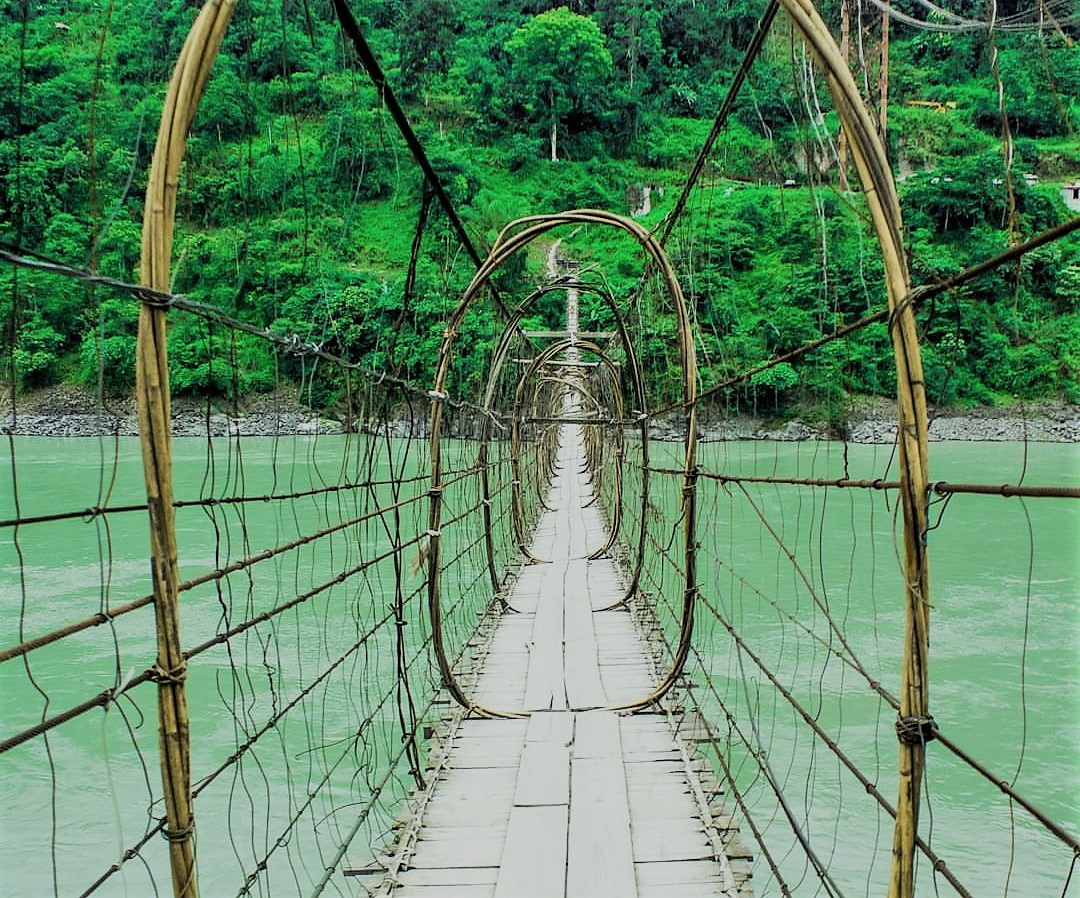
Gandhi Bridge (a makeshift swinging bridge) over the Siang river, made of cane and bamboo. It is a major tourist attraction across Siang river.

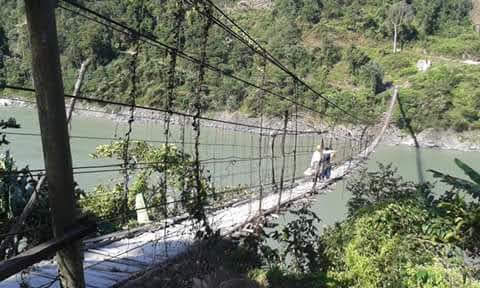
Yeingkiong Gandhi bridze

== COVID-19 ==
The town has confirmed multiple cases of COVID-19. Among them was a student returnee from the National Capital Region and the Health and Family Welfare Minister of Arunachal Pradesh who is a native of Yingkiong. The town does not have a COVID-19 testing lab facility.

== Notable people ==
- Gegong Apang
- Alo Libang
