= Jamin (Arunachal Pradesh) =

Coordinates: 27.753°N 93.617°E

Jamin, also known as Choba, is a small village of the newly created Kra Daadi district of Arunachal Pradesh. It is located 20 km from Palin town.
