= Balo Raja =

Indian politician from Arunachal Pradesh (born c. 1970)

Minister for Urban Affairs, Land Management and Civil Aviation, Government of Arunachal Pradesh
- Incumbent
- Assumed office 13 June 2024
- Chief Minister: Pema Khandu

Member of the Arunachal Pradesh Legislative Assembly
- Incumbent
- Assumed office 23 May 2019
- Preceded by: Takam Pario
- Constituency: Palin
- In office October 2004 – October 2009
- Preceded by: Takam Sanjoy
- Succeeded by: Takam Pario
- Constituency: Palin

Personal details
- Born: 1970 (age 55–56) Raibalo, Kra Daadi district, Arunachal Pradesh, India
- Party: Bharatiya Janata Party
- Other political affiliations: Indian National Congress (2009)
- Parent: Balo Dachak (father)
- Education: Jawaharlal Nehru College, Pasighat (BA)

Balo Raja (born c. 1970) is an Indian politician from Arunachal Pradesh who has served as the Minister for Urban Affairs, Land Management, and Civil Aviation in the Fifth Pema Khandu ministry since 13 June 2024. A member of the Bharatiya Janata Party (BJP), he is a three-term Member of the Arunachal Pradesh Legislative Assembly representing the Palin constituency, having been elected in 2004, 2019, and 2024.

== Early life and education ==
Raja was born to Balo Dachak and hails from Raibalo village in the Gangte circle of Kra Daadi district, Arunachal Pradesh. He completed his Bachelor of Arts degree in 1990 from Jawaharlal Nehru College, Pasighat, affiliated with Arunachal University (now Rajiv Gandhi University). His wife serves as a Senior Medical Officer with the Government of Arunachal Pradesh.

== Political career ==
=== Legislative career (2004–2024) ===
Raja first entered the Arunachal Pradesh Legislative Assembly in the 2004 Arunachal Pradesh Legislative Assembly election, contesting as a Bharatiya Janata Party candidate from the Palin Assembly constituency. He defeated the sitting Indian National Congress (INC) legislator Takam Sanjoy by a margin of 892 votes, securing 5,545 votes (54.37%). In the 2009 Arunachal Pradesh Legislative Assembly election, he contested from Palin on an INC ticket but lost to People's Party of Arunachal (PPA) candidate Takam Pario by 689 votes.

Returning to the BJP, Raja reclaimed the Palin constituency in the 2019 Arunachal Pradesh Legislative Assembly election, defeating INC incumbent Takam Pario by a margin of 730 votes. In the 2024 Arunachal Pradesh Legislative Assembly election, he was re-elected for a third term from Palin, polling 10,029 votes (65.02%) and defeating National People's Party candidate Mayu Taring by a margin of 5,040 votes.

=== Cabinet Minister (2024–present) ===
On 13 June 2024, Raja was sworn in as a cabinet minister in the Fifth Pema Khandu ministry. On 15 June 2024, Chief Minister Pema Khandu allocated him the portfolios of Urban Affairs, Land Management, and Civil Aviation.

In February 2026, as Civil Aviation Minister, Raja held consultations with commercial airlines to expand flight operations and regional connectivity from Donyi Polo Airport in Itanagar. In May 2026, representing the state at the national review meeting of the Swachh Bharat Mission (Urban) 2.0 in New Delhi, he requested the Union Government to revise the per-capita central funding criteria for hill states in Northeast India. In July 2026, he directed district administrations to expedite the demarcation and notification of four new municipalities in the state.

== Electoral history ==
Electoral performance of Balo Raja in the Arunachal Pradesh Legislative Assembly
Year	Constituency	Party	Votes	%	Opponent	Opponent party	Opponent votes	%	Result	Ref
2004	Palin	Bharatiya Janata Party	5,545	54.37	Takam Sanjoy	Indian National Congress	4,653	45.63	Won	
2009	Palin	Indian National Congress	5,326	46.65	Takam Pario	People's Party of Arunachal	6,015	52.68	Lost	
2019	Palin	Bharatiya Janata Party	5,727	44.97	Takam Pario	Indian National Congress	4,997	39.24	Won	
2024	Palin	Bharatiya Janata Party	10,029	65.02	Mayu Taring	National People's Party	4,989	32.35	Won	

== Controversy ==
In October 2026, Raja attracted controversy after responding to remarks about India–China border tensions by urging people to watch the Bollywood film Dhurandhar to understand India's intelligence capabilities. The remarks drew attention for his use of a fictional spy thriller to illustrate the capabilities of India's intelligence agencies in the context of a real-world border-security issue.
