= Puging =

Village in Upper Siang, Arunachal Pradesh, India

Coordinates: 28°45′N 94°57′E

Puging is a village near Yingkiong in Upper Siang district of Arunachal Pradesh.
