= Purang apin =

Traditionally cooked rice of the Mising community of Assam

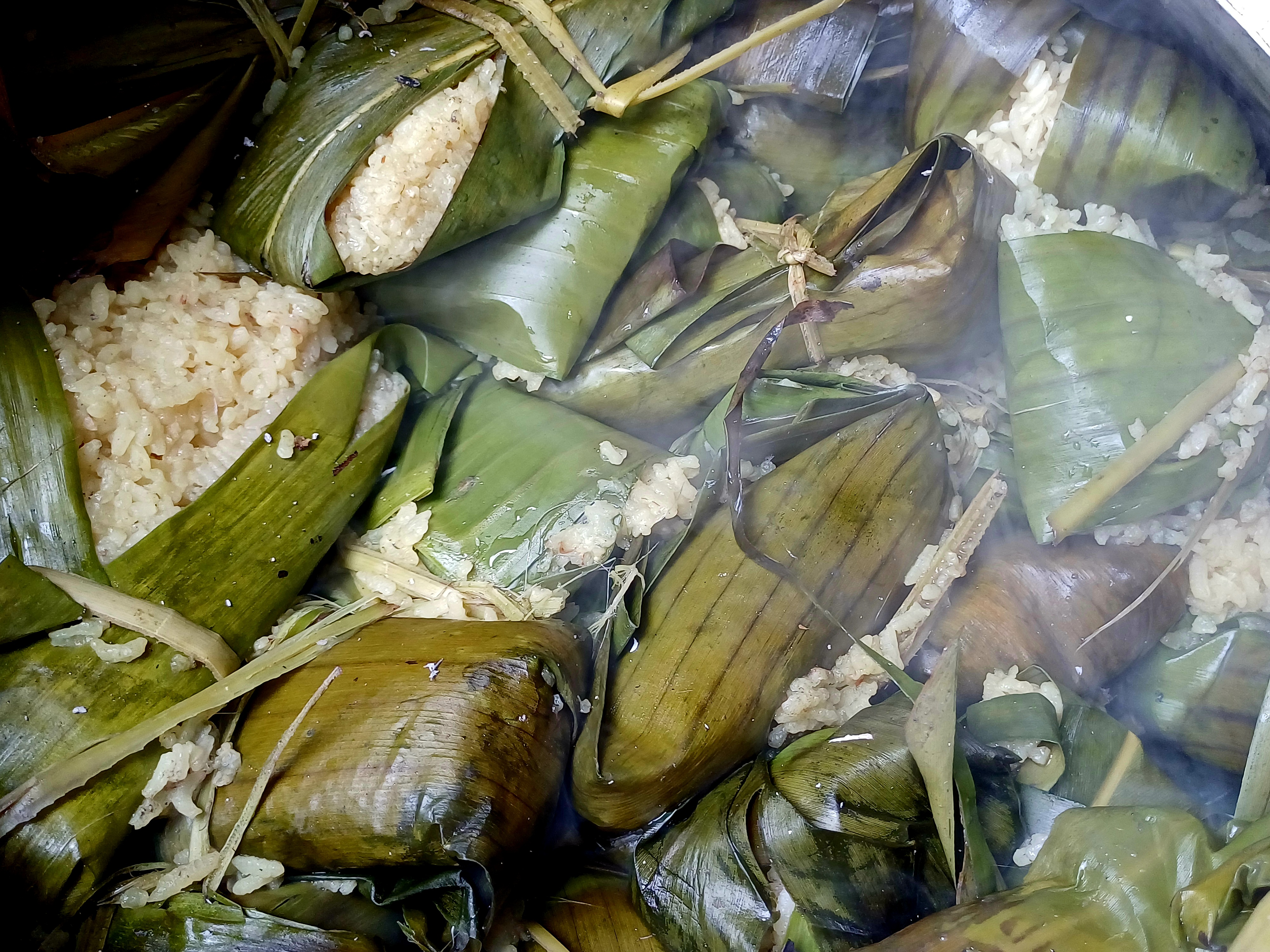
- Purang apin wrapped in Alpinia nigra leaf
- Type: cooked rice
- Place of origin: India
- Region or state: Assam, Arunachal Pradesh
- Associated cuisine: Assamese
- Main ingredients: Glutinous rice

Purang apin is a traditionally cooked rice of the Mising people of Assam. It is prepared by boiling bora saul a type of glutinous rice wrapped in Alpinia nigra leaf. In addition to various festivals such as Ali A:yé Lígang, purang apin is also prepared on other occasions and is served with various dishes. Alternatively, it can also be consumed with milk and jaggery.

== Preparation ==
Purang apin is cooked in Alpinia nigra leaf. It is mainly prepared using bora rice or lahi rice. The rice is washed first and soaked in water for some time. This rice is extracted from the water. Leaves are then laid out horizontally and small portions of the rice are placed onto them. The stems of the Alpinia nigra tree or the stem of the banana leaf are used to tie these bundles. The bundles are boiled for about 20-25 minutes. It is then taken out of the water and kept for some time and served with various non-vegetarian and vegetarian dishes when the water dries up.

== Cultural significance ==
Purang apin occupies an important place in the communal feast of the Mising spring festival Ali A:yé Lígang. In the weeks leading up to the festival, women prepare large quantities of Po:ro and Nogin Apong. On the day of the celebration, women are primarily responsible for making Purang, fish and meat curries, and for filtering Apong. The ceremonial meal begins with the head of each family consuming a packet of Purang together with a bowl of Po:ro Apong; where the feast is organised collectively, the ritual is initiated by the village head.

Guests and participants are then served Purang with Apong and a variety of fish and meat dishes, and the feasting continues throughout the day. In the evening, the village headman and family heads visit each household in procession, during which they are again offered Purang, Apong and other dishes.
