= Carrot seed oil =

Essential oil extract of carrot seed

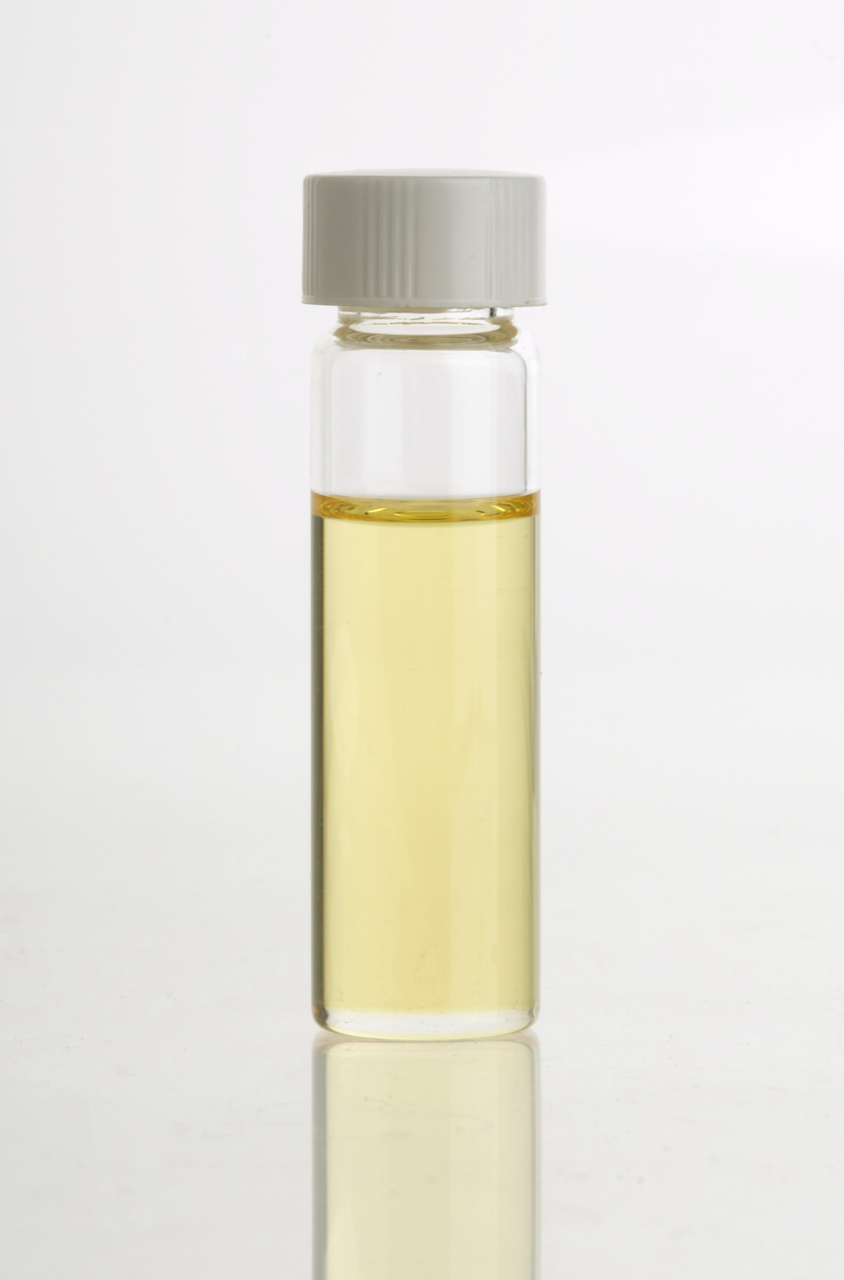
Carrot seed (Daucus carota) essential oil in clear glass vial

Carrot seed oil is the essential oil extract of the seed from the carrot plant Daucus carota. The oil has a woody, earthy sweet smell and is yellow or amber-coloured to pale orange-brown in appearance. The pharmacologically active constituents of carrot seed extract are three flavones: luteolin, luteolin 3'-O-beta-D-glucopyranoside, and luteolin 4'-O-beta-D-glucopyranoside. Rather than the extract the distilled (ethereal) oil is used in perfumery and food aromatization. The main constituent of this oil is carotol.

Pressed carrot seed oil is extracted by cold-pressing the seeds of the carrot plant. The properties of pressed carrot seed oil are quite different from those of the essential oil.
