= Alpinia nigra =

Scientific classification
- Kingdom: Plantae
- Clade: Tracheophytes
- Clade: Angiosperms
- Clade: Monocots
- Clade: Commelinids
- Order: Zingiberales
- Family: Zingiberaceae
- Genus: Alpinia
- Species: A. nigra

Binomial name
- Alpinia nigra (Gaertn.) B.L.Burtt, 1977

Species of flowering plant

Alpinia nigra (synonyms Alpinia allughas Retz. and Zingiber nigrum Gaertn.) is a medium-sized herb belonging to the ginger family. The rhizome is well known in many Asian cultures as a medicinal and culinary item. In many Asian tribal communities it is a part of the diet along with rice.

It is endemic to south-east Asia including Bhutan, China, India, Thailand, Bangladesh, Burma and Sri Lanka. In India it is found mainly in the hillocks and riversides of northeastern states such as Assam, Mizoram and Tripura.

== Description ==
Alpinia nigra is a biennial herbaceous plant. It is morphologically characterized by the presence of a rhizome, simple, wide-brim leaves protected by showy bracts, and terminal inflorescences. It has a soft, leafy stem about 1.5–3 m high. Leaves are sessile or subsessile, elongated and pointed at the end. Its leaves are single cotyledons, shaped to look like a pike, about 7–9 cm wide, and about 20–40 cm long. The fruit is a berry having many seeds, and the pericarp is thin and green when it is young, becoming black and brittle when it gets old.

== Chemical constituents ==
The major chemical contents are alkaloids, flavonoids, phenols and terpenoids. The rhizome yields 0.05% essential oil; of which the chief compounds are: 23.0% caryophyllene oxide, 19.9% geraniol, 19.4% eudesmool and 16.5% citronellyl OAc. Important compounds isolated from the seed cluster are kaempferol-3-O-glucoside (astragalin, I), kaempferol-3-O-glucuronide (II), heptatriacontanoic acid 2, 3-dihydroxypropyl ester (III), heptatriacontanoic acid 1, 3-dihydroxypropyl ester (IV) and pentatriacontanoic acid 1, 3-dihydroxypropyl ester (V). In addition, two major volatile oils, β-pinene and α-pinene have also been isolated from the fruits and rhizomes. From the seed clusters two bioactive flavone glycosides were isolated, astragalin and kaempferol-3-O-glucuronide; and kaempferol-3-O-glucuronide was found to be a dominant compound which was distributed primarily in the pulp. The chemical 1,8-cineole is the major component in the leaf essential oil (25.4%) and rhizome oil (34%). In addition, β-pinene (15.1%), camphor (15.3%), carotol (7.3%), α-pinene (7.8%) and camphene (7.0%) were also present in leaf oil, whereas in the rhizome oil α-fenchyl acetate (13.1%), α-terpineol (9.6%), β-pinene (8.1%) and camphene (7.0%) were the other main constituents.

== Uses ==
=== Food ===
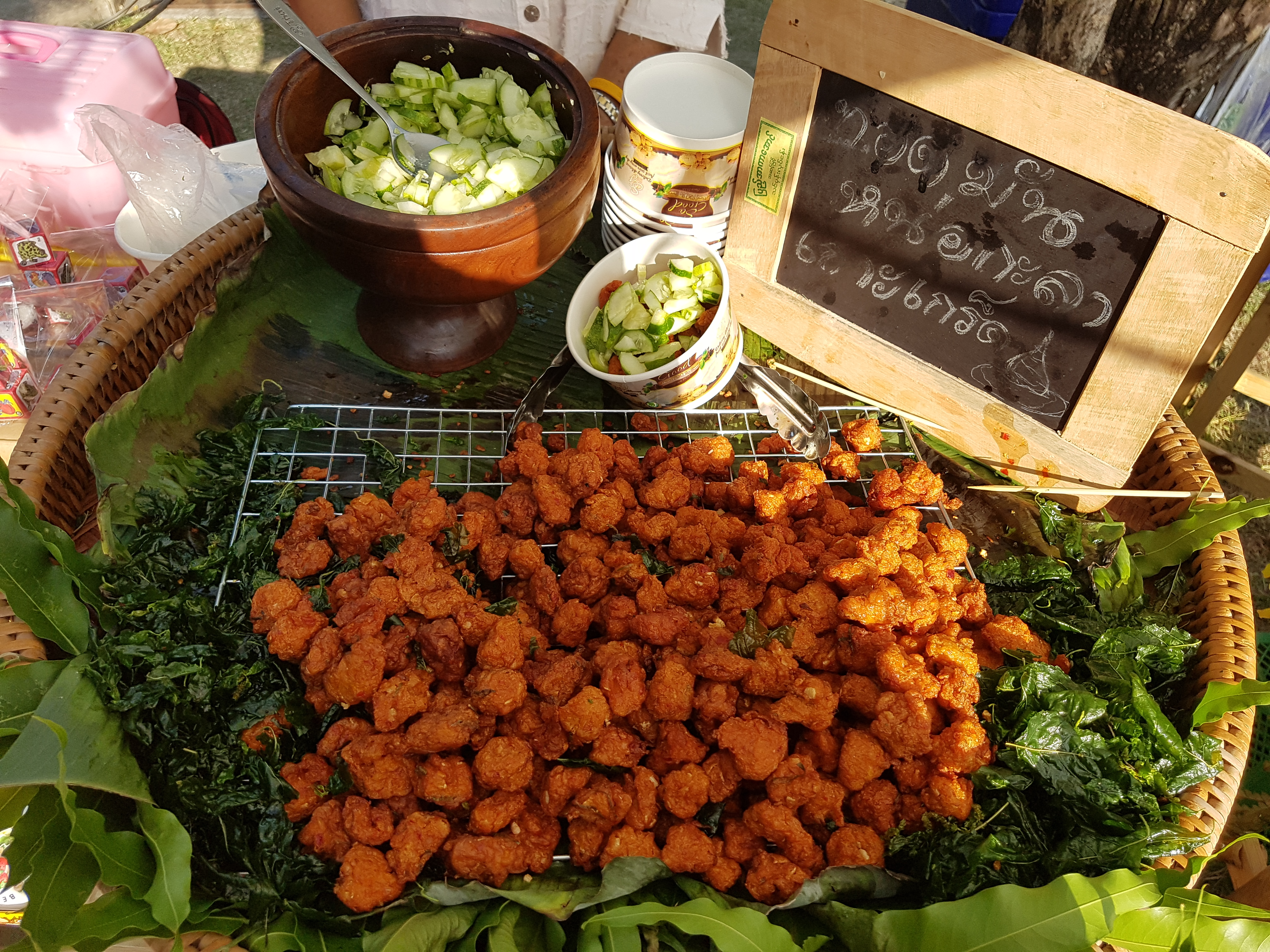
Thot man nor kala (ทอดมันหน่อกะลา), Thai fishcakes mixed Alpinia nigra

The inner portion of the aerial parts (pith) is cooked as a vegetable and used in curry for flavouring. The root is used for seasoning. In Amphoe Pak Kret (include Ko Kret), Nonthaburi province, central Thailand, it was mixed in the Thot man (Thai fishcake). It is a notable local food which only sold here. Among the Boro of Assam the pith is mixed with chicken and fried as a much relished delicacy. Its aromatic leaves are used to wrap fish for baking, roasting or steaming by them.

=== Medicine ===
The rhizome is used as an aphrodisiac, tonic, diuretic, expectorant, appetizer and analgesic. It is also used in the treatment of impotence and bronchitis.

In most tribal communities the root pounded and mixed with rice whisky is applied to skin for fungal infections, such as ringworm and melasma. The boiled green root is a potent carminative to reduce flatulence or dyspepsia. A root extract is taken thrice daily for the treatment of gastric ulcers, and taken twice daily for the treatment of jaundice by the Chakmas. Its use as an antiinflammatory and analgesic agent has been supported by experiments in mice.

The rhizome, cooked or raw, has been traditionally acclaimed as a remedy for intestinal infections among the Mizo tribes of north-east India. Experimentally the crude extract was shown to be highly effective against the trematode Fasciolopsis buski.
