= National Highway 513 (India) =

National Highway in India

National Highway 513
- Map of National Highway 513 in red

Route information
- Auxiliary route of NH 13
- Length: 140 km (87 mi)

Major junctions
- South end: Pasighat
- North end: Yingkiong

Location
- Country: India
- States: Arunachal Pradesh

Highway system
- Roads in India; Expressways; National; State; Asian
← NH 13	→ NH 513

National Highway 513 (NH 513) is a National Highway in North East India that connects Pasighat and Yingkiong in Arunachal Pradesh. It is a secondary route of National Highway 13. NH-513 runs entirely in the state of Arunachal Pradesh in India.

== Route ==
NH513 connects Passighat, Mariyang and Yingkiong in the state of Arunachal Pradesh in India.

== Junctions ==
NH 13 Terminal near Passighat.

== See also ==
- List of national highways in India
- National Highways Development Project
