= Fagun =

Santali language monthly newspaper that provide tribal information

- Type: Monthly Newspaper
- Format: Broadsheet
- Owner: Fagun Publishers Pvt. Ltd.
- Publisher: Fagun Publishers Pvt. Ltd.
- Editor-in-chief: Magat Murmu
- Editor: Malati Murmu
- Staff writers: BirSar Hembram
- Founded: 4 April, 2008
- Language: Santali
- Headquarters: Bhubaneswar, India

Fagun is a monthly newspaper published on paper in the Santali language in the Ol Chiki script in Bhubaneswar, Odisha. It is the only newspaper in India that is published in Santali, and has readership across the country. The newspaper was founded in April 2008 by Mangat Murmu. It is edited by Malati Murmu, who received the Telegraph Legend Award in 2016. Fagun started with a circulation of 500 copies, and as of 2018 has a circulation of 5000. Copies cost ₹5 each.

In addition to news, Fagun publishes a cultural section which includes short stories and poems are printed as well as reviews and event announcements. A section for women and children publishes cooking recipes, among other things. The syllabus for college students is published as well, mostly Santali languages course syllabus which is now recently being taught by some university in Odisha such as Sambalpur University and North Orissa University.
