= Yazali, Arunachal Pradesh =

Yazali is a census town in Lower Subansiri district in the Indian state of Arunachal Pradesh.It is the headquarters of west division. According to the 2011 Census of India, it had a total population of 1768 individuals in 363 households. The town is largely inhabited by members of the Nyishi tribe. The town is believed to be threatened by Stage-II of the Ranganadi Dam, since it might be submerged by the reservoir.

== See also ==
- New Palin, a town in the Kurung Kumey district
