= Carotol =

Names
- Preferred IUPAC name (3R,3aS,8aR)-6,8a-Dimethyl-3-(propan-2-yl)-2,3,4,5,8,8a-hexahydroazulen-3a(1H)-ol

Identifiers
CAS Number	465-28-1
3D model (JSmol)	Interactive image
ChemSpider	390799
PubChem CID	442347
UNII	NT5C9M36DE
CompTox Dashboard (EPA)	DTXSID101318114
- InChI: InChI=1/C15H26O/c1-11(2)13-7-9-14(4)8-5-12(3)6-10-15(13,14)16/h5,11,13,16H,6-10H2,1-4H3/t13-,14+,15+/m1/s1 Key: XZYQCFABZDVOPN-ILXRZTDVBA
- SMILES: O[C@@]12CC\C(=C/C[C@]2(CC[C@@H]1C(C)C)C)C

Properties
Chemical formula	C_{15}H_{26}O
Molar mass	222.366 g/mol
- Except where otherwise noted, data are given for materials in their standard state (at 25 °C [77 °F], 100 kPa). Infobox references

Carotol was first isolated by scientists Asahina and Tsukamoto in 1925. It is one of the primary components found in carrot seed oil comprising approximately 40% of this essential oil. This sesquiterpene alcohol is thought to be formed in carrot seeds (Daucus carota L., Umbelliferae) during the vegetation period. Additionally, studies have shown that carotol may be involved in allelopathic interactions expressing activity as an antifungal, herbicidal and insecticidal agent.

== Biosynthesis ==
It has been proposed that there is a direct cyclisation of farnesyl pyrophosphate (FPP) to the carotol (carotane backbone). This type of cyclisation is unconventional for the typical chemistry of sesquiterpenes. The only other proposed mechanism requires a complex ten-membered ring with a methyl migration. This latter reaction, regardless of how plausible it may appear to be on paper, is energetically undesired, and through the diligent work of M. Soucek and coworkers, it was shown that the cyclization from FPP to carotol is the most probable biosynthesis route.

The formation of farnesyl pyrophosphate is via the mevalonate pathway. An additional five-carbon IPP unit is added in the same manner to GPP.

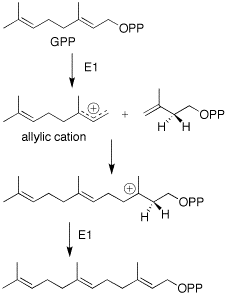
Formation of FPP.

The cyclization of FPP proceeds via a synchronous reaction of trans-antiparallel additions. This leads to the trans carbocation intermediate. Further cyclisation occurs yielding the 5 and 7-membered ring carbocation. This is followed by a 1,3-hydride shift and subsequent deprotonation to the diene. It is suggested that the carbocation elimination is directed to retain the proper structure of the isopropyl group. Based on the work of Soucek it is then proposed that a stereospecific hydration will then take place leading to the enzymatic introduction of the hydroxyl group.

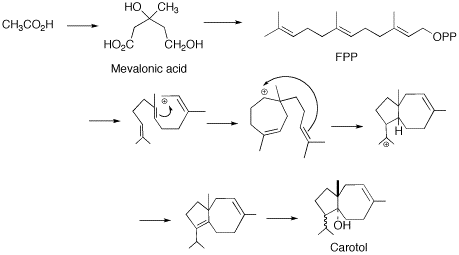
Proposed cyclization of FPP to Carotol.
