= Tali, Arunachal Pradesh =

Village in Arunachal Pradesh, India

Tali is a village in the Indian state of Arunachal Pradesh. Kra daadi is the name of the district that contains village Tali.

Tali is located 71 km towards East from District headquarters Koloriang. It is one of the 60 constituencies of Legislative Assembly of Arunachal Pradesh. The name of current MLA (August-2022) of this constituency is Shri Jikke Tako.

== See also ==
- List of constituencies of Arunachal Pradesh Legislative Assembly
- Arunachal Pradesh Legislative Assembly
