= Takam Pario =

Indian politician

Takam Pario Tagar is an Indian politician who formerly served as the Leader of Opposition in Arunachal Pradesh Legislative Assembly. His real name is Takam Tagar but is affectionately called Pario. He won the 2009 Arunachal Pradesh Legislative Assembly election on a PPA ticket, switched to the Indian National Congress and won the 2014 elections on an INC ticket and later switched to the PPA, before returning to the Congress again. He is currently a member of Indian National Congress.

Takam Pario was elected unopposed from the Palin constituency in the 2014 Arunachal Pradesh Legislative Assembly election, standing as an INC candidate.

On 30 December 2016, Pema Khandu along with 6 other MLAs were suspended as a member of the People's Party of Arunachal by the party president and Takam Pario was named as the next likely Chief Minister of Arunachal Pradesh replacing Pema Khandu. For the assembly elections held in 2009 and 2014, Takam Pario was the richest candidate standing for election to the Arunachal Pradesh Legislative Assembly, with assets worth 200 crores.

== See also ==
- Arunachal Pradesh Legislative Assembly
