= Porag =

- Genre: Folk
- Frequency: annual
- Locations: Assam, India
- Patron: Mising people

Porag (pronounced Po:rag) is a five-day long post-harvest festival observed by the Misings of Assam. Drummers and dancers belonging to a village are invited to perform in the neighboring village. It is a festival of songs and dances.

== Significance ==
Generally Miri youths, after harvesting the crops, observe this festival in order to appease the supposed Almighty, mother earth and their forefathers and seek blessings from them. Both young boys and girls in their traditional attire take part in singing and dancing. The songs are based on agriculture and the dances are typical imitation of the dance postures of the agricultural works.

== Celebration ==
=== Arrangement ===
The youth organisation of the tribe arranges the festival in a formal and systematic manner called "Daghik". Officers are appointed as Migam Bora, Bar Puwary, etc. under whom there are some high and low officers, such as Deka Bora, Tiri Bora, Tamuli and Bar Barani, who assist them. In ancient times, a "Miboo" was appointed as leader for the functioning of the festival. Nowadays, he has been replaced by Migam Bora and Bar puwary.

=== Muroung ===
The "Murong" is the community hall of the Misings. At the beginning of the festival, the Morung is renovated by decorating the tie-beams and the posts. Nowadays, in some villages, the system of decorating them has changed and a new one is used.

=== Feast ===
A grand feast is arranged where at least four to five pigs are sacrificed. The host village invites neighboring villages to take part in the festival as Minams (guests). The Minams are cordially received and taken with Gumrag dance to the Morung. The festival ends with a prayer dance known as "Ponu Nunam".

== See also ==
- Assamese culture
