= Kra Daadi district =

- District of Arunachal Pradesh
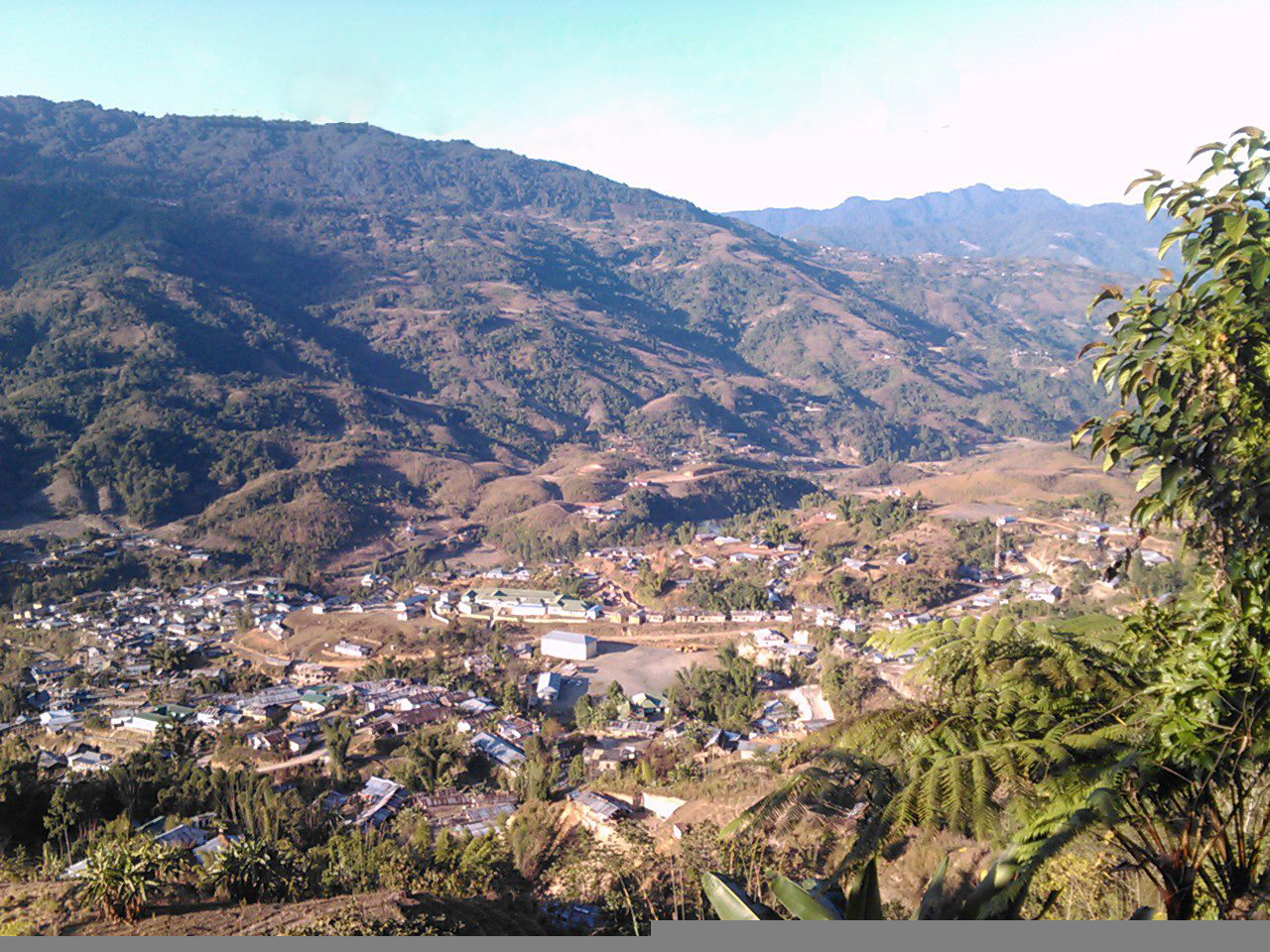
- View of Palin town

- Location in Arunachal Pradesh
- Coordinates (New Palin, Arunachal Pradesh): 28.072°N 95.325°E
- Country: India
- State: Arunachal Pradesh
- Division: Arunachal west
- Headquarters: Palin

Government
  - Lok Sabha constituencies: Arunachal west

Area
  - Total: 2,202 km^{2} (850 sq mi)
- Elevation: 2,060 m (6,760 ft)

Population (2011)
  - Total: 46,123
  - Density: 20.95/km^{2} (54.25/sq mi)

Demographics
  - Literacy: 44%
  - Sex ratio: NA
- Time zone: UTC+05:30 (IST)
- PIN: 791118
- Website: kradaadi.nic.in

Kra Daadi district is a district in Arunachal Pradesh in north-eastern India. It was carved out of Kurung Kumey district on 7 February 2015. Kra Daadi district is flanked by Tibet international border with China to the north, Upper Subansiri district to the east, Lower Subansiri district to the south, Papum Pare district to the southeast, Kurung Kumey district to the west.

== History ==
The creation of Kra Daadi district was approved on 21 March 2013 under the Arunachal Pradesh (Re-Organization of Districts) (Amendment) Bill.

Kra Daadi was inaugurated by the then Chief Minister Nabam Tuki as the 19th district of Arunachal Pradesh on 7 February 2015.

== Administration ==
Palin is the headquarter of the district. It has two assembly constituencies, viz., Tali, Palin, covering eight circles viz. clockwise from north, Pipsorang, Tali, Chambang, Palin, Yangte, Tarak Langdi, and Gangte.

Pania is a sub-division in the district located few miles away from Palin and is administered by an Additional Deputy Commissioner.

== Demographics ==
The district has a population of 46,704. Scheduled Tribes are 46,123 (98.76%).

Religions in Kra Daadi district (2011)
Religion	Per cent
Christianity	63.93%
Donyi-Polo	28.98%
Hinduism	5.25%
Islam	0.52%
Other or not stated	1.32%

Nyishi is the predominant language, spoken by 98.43% of the population.
