= Nyokum =

Festival celebrated by India's Nyishi tribe

Nyokum is a festival celebrated by the Nyishi tribe of the Indian state of Arunachal Pradesh. The Word Nyokum has been derived from the combination of two words - Nyok means land (earth) and Kum means collectiveness or togetherness. Therefore, the Nyokum festival may very well be interpreted as inviting all the Gods and Goddesses of the universe, with the Nyokum Goddess as the principal deity, to a particular venue at a particular time. The festival is commonly celebrated by the people from all class and walk of life for better productivity, prosperity and happiness of all human beings.

== Significance ==
The festival has a close link with cultivation. The Nyokum goddess, the goddess of prosperity is invoked for her blessings so that there may be more and more production of food-grains in the next harvesting season, that the visit of famine may be warded off, and that drought or flood may not hamper cultivation, nor should any insect or animal destroy plants and crops. The Goddess is invoked so that the human race may be strengthened and regenerated. All should be free from unnatural death due to accident, war and epidemic.

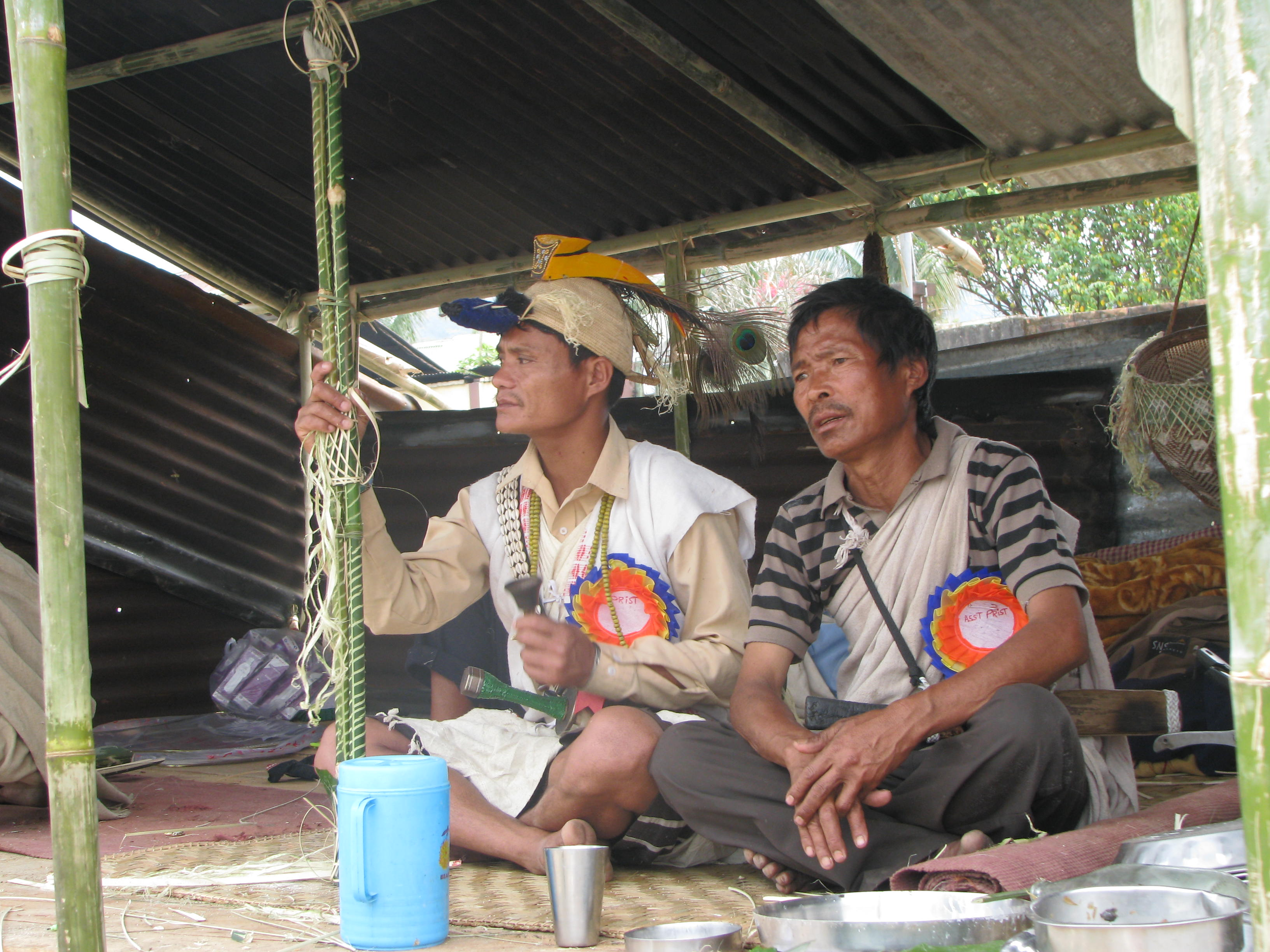
A priest during Nyokum puja, Arunachal Pradesh

Ui or Oram Nyoko is the place meant for the life after death. It is also believed that there are numerous deities and spirits on earth. These are the deities and spirits of mountains, rivers, forest, animals crops, household and so on and so forth. Some of the spirits are benevolent and others are malevolent. The Nyishi believe that human being's can live a life of peace and prosperity on this earth only when a perfect harmony is maintained between man, God and nature. They also believe that prosperity and happiness can come to a man when God and nature are pleased. Misery, hardship and natural calamities like famine, flood, drought, earthquake, epidemic, warfare, accidental death and such unwanted incidents occur due to the displeasure and wrath of the God and Goddess of nature. It is, therefore, the Nyishi worship to propitiate the benevolent Gods and Goddess to protect and bring prosperity to them and to ward off the malevolent spirits from disturbing the peace and tranquility in their life, Nyokum Yullow is one of such propitiation.

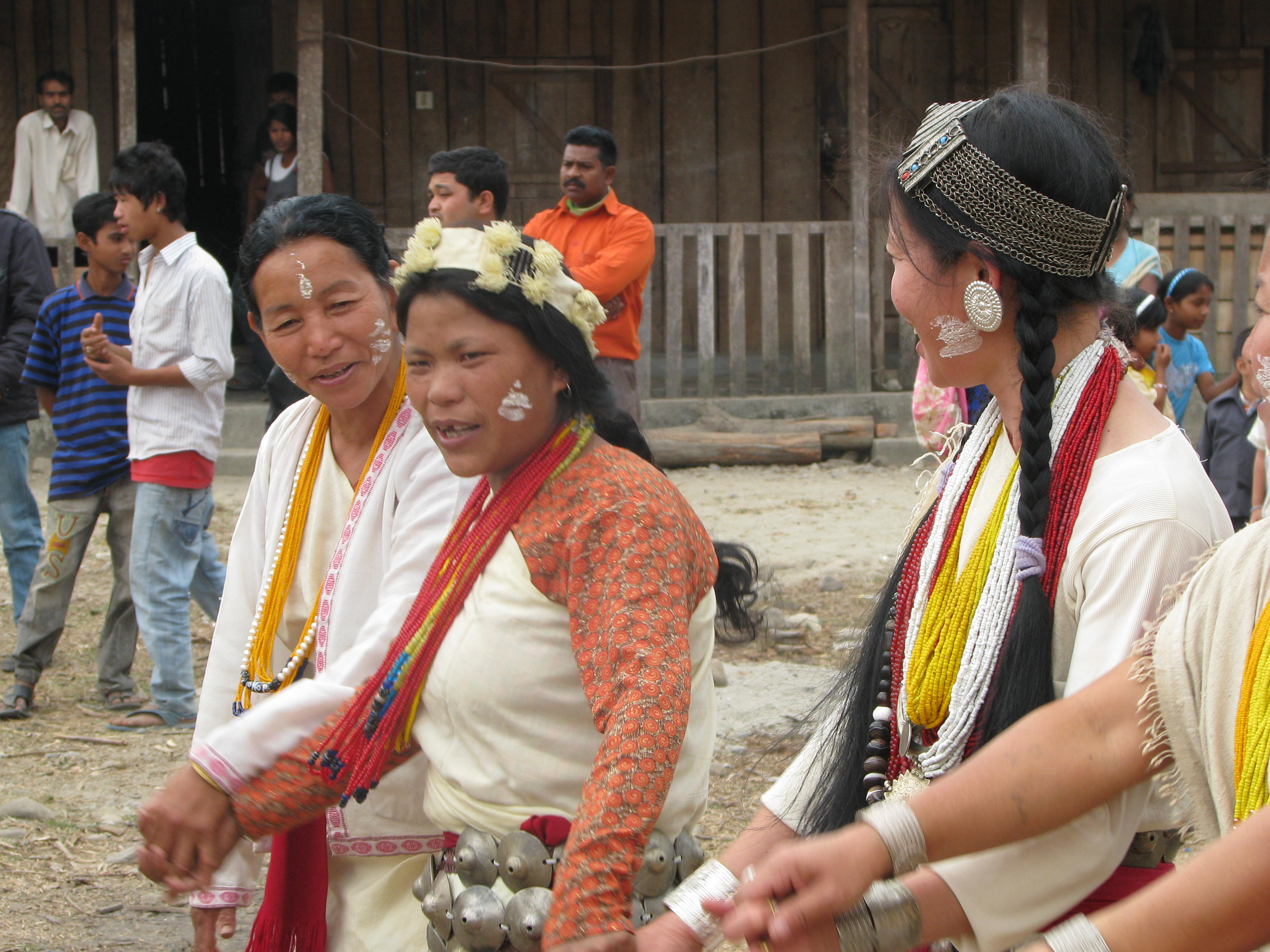
Women dancing around the sacrificial altar at Nyokum puja

== Rituals ==
The main prayer structure of the Nyishi is made of bamboo, called the yugang. Alongside the yugang sacrificial animals are tethered. Like cows, mithuns, and goats. Often one finds small chickens hung from bamboo poles of the yugang. The nyubh or the traditional priest specifies the number and kinds of animals for sacrifice, or any other offering to be made. There are no idols in this worship. Neither is there any permanent structure. Besides the animal sacrifice, beer made from millet seeds and rice paste is used.

People turn up wearing their traditional clothes during this time. The men dress in a cotton eri robe draped from the shoulder and reaching the thighs. From their neck hangs a variety of bead jewellery necklaces. Often semi precious stones like turquoise adorn these necklaces. The men's attire is topped by a bamboo woven cap on the head. This cap is decorated with feathers or furs of wild animals. The beak of the hornbill is a favorite ornament for the traditional cap. The women also dress in their finery of par ej, earrings bead necklaces, topped with a headdress made of finely scaped bamboo.

There is singing and dancing before the head priest or nyubh comes with his attendants to perform the main ritual. Guests are welcomed with rice paste powder, and opo or millet seed beer which is scooped in dried gourd ladles. The song and dance are performed in a group. Usually men and women hold hands in a circular form and sing and dance these lines Nyokum bo tapa debe. And sometimes men dance mock fights with dao (short sword) and shield made of animal hide.

== Rikham Pada the Folk Dance of the Nyishi Tribe ==
Rikham Pada means giant, handsome, undefeatable and matured man Rinyam Yami means young and handsome looking boy

Both Rikham Pada and Rinyam Yami were two brothers.

They (Rikham Pada & Rinyam Yami) were attire with beautiful traditional dresses which adding up their handsomeness, the most beautiful girls of the universe were after them. So marriage proposals were impending like shooting star, flowing of pure and milky river water,

Rikham Pada was man of principle, therefore he rejected them. So their imagination of marrying to Rikham pada was depicting in the form of song and dances.
