= List of people from Arunachal Pradesh =

This is a list of notable people from Arunachal Pradesh, India.

== Arts ==
- Mamang Dai – poet, novelist and journalist of the Adi community; recipient of the Padma Shri (2011) and the Sahitya Akademi Award in English (2017) for The Black Hill
- Yeshe Dorjee Thongchi – Assamese-language novelist of the Sherdukpen community; recipient of the Padma Shri (2020) and Sahitya Akademi Award (2005) for the novel Mauna Outh Mukhar Hriday

== Defence ==
=== Gallantry award recipients ===
- Hangpan Dada – Ashoka Chakra (posthumous, 2016); killed in action against militants in Kupwara, Jammu and Kashmir

=== Freedom fighters ===
- Moje Riba

=== Insurgents ===
- Anthony Doke – Commander in Chief of Tani Army

== Entertainment ==
- Chum Darang – actress and model; appeared in Paatal Lok (2020), Badhaai Do (2022) and Gangubai Kathiawadi (2022); fourth runner-up on Bigg Boss 18

== Politicians ==
=== Chief Ministers ===
- Prem Khandu Thungon, the first Chief Minister of Arunachal Pradesh (1975–1979)
- Tomo Riba (1979–1980)
- Gegong Apang (1980–1999; 2003–2007); longest-serving Chief Minister of the state
- Mukut Mithi (1999–2003); later Lieutenant Governor of Puducherry
- Jarbom Gamlin (May–November 2011)
- Nabam Tuki (2011–2016)
- Kalikho Pul (February–July 2016)
- Pema Khandu (2016–present); third consecutive term sworn in June 2024
- List of chief ministers of Arunachal Pradesh

=== Present and ex Union Ministers ===
- Kiren Rijiju – Union Cabinet Minister; BJP MP for Arunachal West
- Ninong Ering – former Union Minister of State; former MP from Arunachal East
- Daying Ering – former Deputy Minister, Government of India

=== Other politicians from Arunachal Pradesh ===
- Bamang Felix – MLA from Nyapin; former Home Minister of Arunachal Pradesh
- Chowna Mein – Deputy Chief Minister of Arunachal Pradesh since 2016; the longest-serving incumbent Deputy Chief Minister in India
- Jomin Tayeng – first IAS officer from Arunachal Pradesh; MLA from Dambuk
- Takam Sanjoy – former INC Member of Parliament

== Civil services and bureaucracy ==
- Tati Lego – administrator
- Robin Hibu – senior IPS officer; founder of the welfare initiative Helping Hands for people from the Northeast
- Shakuntala Doley Gamlin – former Chief Secretary of Arunachal Pradesh; former Secretary, Department of Empowerment of Persons with Disabilities, Government of India

== Social activism ==
- Binny Yanga – social worker; founder of the Oju Welfare Association

== Healthcare ==
- Yanung Jamoh Lego, Indian folk herbalist

== Sports ==
=== Mountaineering ===
- Anshu Jamsenpa – mountaineer; first woman in the world to summit Mount Everest twice within five days (2017); five-time Everest summiteer
- Tapi Mra – first person from Arunachal Pradesh to summit Mount Everest (2009)
- Tine Mena – first woman from Arunachal Pradesh and the Northeast to summit Mount Everest (2011)

== Religion ==
- Talom Rukbo – the founding figure of the Donyi-Polo indigenous-faith revival movement

== Non-Arunachalis with significant contributions to Arunachal Pradesh ==
- Major Ralengnao "Bob" Khathing, MC, MBE, Padma Shri – Tangkhul Naga officer from Manipur; led the 1951 expedition that integrated Tawang into the Indian Union; later Indian ambassador to Myanmar and Chief Secretary of Nagaland
- Verrier Elwin – British-born Indian anthropologist; Anthropological Adviser to the Government of NEFA; author of A Philosophy for NEFA (1957); his work shaped early tribal-affairs policy in the region

== See also ==
- Demographics of Arunachal Pradesh
- List of Governors of Arunachal Pradesh
- Culture of Arunachal Pradesh
