= Gamlin ministry =

Arunachal state cabinet headed by Jarbom Gamlin

- 14th ministry of Arunachal Pradesh
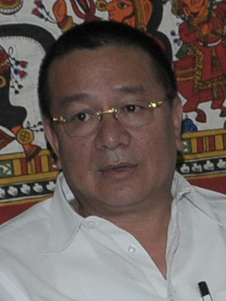
- Jarbom Gamlin, Chief Minister
- Date formed: 5 May 2011
- Date dissolved: 31 October 2011

People and organisations
- Governor: Joginder Jaswant Singh
- Chief Minister: Jarbom Gamlin
- No. of ministers: 12
- Member parties: Indian National Congress
- Status in legislature: Majority

History
- Election: 2009
- Outgoing election: 2014
- Legislature term: 5 years
- Predecessor: Second Dorjee Khandu ministry
- Successor: First Tuki ministry

The Gamlin ministry was the 14th council of ministers of the Indian state of Arunachal Pradesh headed by chief minister Jarbom Gamlin which was formed on 5 May 2010 following the sudden demise of chief minister Dorjee Khandu in a helicopter crash. The ministry remained in office until chief minister Gamlin's resignation on 31 October 2011.

== History ==
On 30 April 2011, a helicopter carrying the Chief Minister Dorjee Khandu and four others from Tawang to Itanagar went missing. The remains of the passengers and the wreckage of the helicopter were found on 4 May 2011 at the crash site. Following the demise of the chief minister, then state Power Minister Jarbom Gamlin was chosen as his successor by the party leadership and the MLAs and was sworn in into office the following day by governor Joginder Jaswant Singh.

== Cabinet formation ==
Days after being sworn in as the chief minister, Gamlin expanded his ministry on 20 May 2011 and inducted 11 ministers. He inducted all ministers from his predecessor's cabinet which included Kalikho Pul, Nabam Tuki, Chowna Mein, Tako Dabi, Setong Sena, Tanga Byaling, Atum Welly, Takar Marde, Honchun Ngandam and Bosiram Siram. He also included newcomer Pema Khandu who was the son of late chief minister Dorjee Khandu. The portfolios were assigned to the ministers later the same day.

== List of ministers ==
Cabinet members
Portfolio	Minister	Took office	Left office	Party	Constituency
Chief Minister and; All other departments not assigned to any other Minister.	Jarbom Gamlin	5 May 2011	31 October 2011	INC	Liromoba
Minister of Finance; Minister of Planning; Minister of Tax and Excise	Kalikho Pul	20 May 2011	31 October 2011	INC	Hayuliang
Minister of Public Works Development; Minister of Urban Development; Minister of Legal Metrology	Nabam Tuki	20 May 2011	31 October 2011	INC	Sagalee
Minister of Public Health Engineering	Chowna Mein	20 May 2011	31 October 2011	INC	Lekang
Minister of Industries; Minister of Fisheries	Tako Dabi	20 May 2011	31 October 2011	INC	Nari-Koyu
Minister of Home; Minister of Rural Development and Panchayati Raj	Takar Marde	20 May 2011	31 October 2011	INC	Dumporijo
Minister of Power (Electrical); Minister of Environment and Forest; Minister of Parliamentary Affairs	Setong Sena	20 May 2011	31 October 2011	INC	Nampong
Minister of Health and Family Welfare; Minister of Rural Works Development	Atum Welly	20 May 2011	31 October 2011	INC	Pakke-Kessang
Minister of Animal Husbandry and Veterinary	Tanga Byaling	20 May 2011	31 October 2011	INC	Nacho
Minister of Agriculture; Minister of Horticulture	Honchun Ngandam	20 May 2011	31 October 2011	INC	Pongchau-Wakka
Minister of Education; Minister of Libraries	Bosiram Siram	20 May 2011	31 October 2011	INC	Pasighat East
Minister of Tourism; Minister of Water Resources Development	Pema Khandu	20 May 2011	31 October 2011	INC	Mukto
