= Pema Khandu ministry =

Pema Khandu ministry may refer to these cabinets led by Indian politician Pema Khandu as chief minister of Arunachal Pradesh:

- First Pema Khandu ministry (2016–2016)
- Second Pema Khandu ministry (2016–2016)
- Third Pema Khandu ministry (2016–2019)
- Fourth Pema Khandu ministry (2019–2024)
- Fifth Pema Khandu ministry (2024–)
