= Fifth Pema Khandu ministry =

Government of Arunachal Pradesh, India since 2024

- 18th Ministry of Arunachal Pradesh
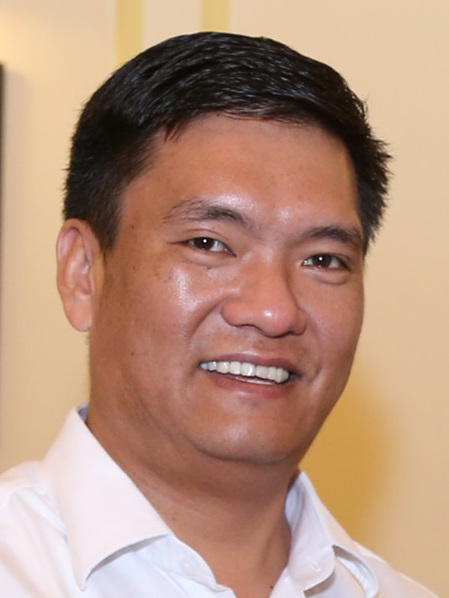
- Pema Khandu; Hon'ble Chief Minister of Arunachal Pradesh
- Date formed: 13 June 2024

People and organisations
- Governor: Kaiwalya Trivikram Parnaik
- Chief Minister: Pema Khandu (BJP)
- Deputy Chief Minister: Chowna Mein (BJP)
- No. of ministers: 11 (excluding CM)
- Member parties: BJP
- Status in legislature: Government (59) NDA (59): BJP (46); NPP (5); NCP (3); PPA (2); IND (3); Opposition (1) INDIA (1): INC (1)
- Opposition party: None
- Opposition leader: Vacant

History
- Election: 2024
- Legislature terms: 2 years, 153 days
- Predecessor: Fourth Pema Khandu ministry

== Council of Ministers ==
In the Fifth Pema Khandu Ministry, with Pema Khandu there are 12 Ministers, in which one is woman i.e., Dasanglu Pul. She was the first woman Cabinet Minister of Arunachal Pradesh in Pema Khandu Ministries. She was the wife of Kalikho Pul, former Chief Minister of the north-eastern state of Arunachal Pradesh for a brief time in 2016. The new ministers with Pema Khandu oath as Cabinet Ministers in the ceremony held at Dorjee Khandu Convention in Itanagar on 13 June 2024 in the presence of Governor Sri Kaiwalya Trivikram Parnaik.

=== Cabinet Ministers ===
Portfolio	Minister	Took office	Left office	Party
Chief Minister and also in-charge of: General Administration, Public Works Department (PWD), Personnel, other departments not allocated to any Minister	Pema Khandu	13 June 2024	Incumbent	BJP
Deputy Chief Ministers
Deputy Chief Minister; Finance, Planning and Investment, Tax & Excise, State Lotteries, Economics & Statistics, and Power and Non-Conventional Energy Resources	Chowna Mein	13 June 2024	Incumbent	BJP
Cabinet Ministers
Rural Development & Panchayati Raj, Cooperation and Transport	Ojing Tasing	13 June 2024	Incumbent	BJP
Law, Legislative and Justice, Social Justice, Empowerment & Tribal Affairs, and Sports & Youth Affairs	Kento Jini	13 June 2024	Incumbent	BJP
Urban Affairs, Land Management, and Civil Aviation	Balo Raja	13 June 2024	Incumbent	BJP
Home and Inter State Border Affairs, Public Health Engineering & Water Supply, Department of Indigenous Affairs	Mama Natung	13 June 2024	Incumbent	BJP
Women & Child Development, Cultural Affairs, and Science & Technology	Dasanglu Pul	13 June 2024	Incumbent	BJP
Education, Rural Works, Parliamentary Affairs, Tourism, and Libraries as a Cabinet Minister	Pasang Dorjee Sona	13 June 2024	Incumbent	BJP
Agriculture, Horticulture, Animal Husbandry & Veterinary, Dairy Development, Fisheries, Food & Civil Supplies, and Consumer Affairs	Gabriel Denwang Wangsu	13 June 2024	Incumbent	BJP
Environment & Forests, Geology, Mining & Minerals, and the Department of Tirap, Changlang, and Longding	Wangki Lowang	13 June 2024	Incumbent	BJP
Commerce & Industries, Labour & Employment, and Information & Public Relations & Printing.	Nyato Dukam	13 June 2024	Incumbent	BJP
Health & Family Welfare and Water Resources departments	Biyuram Wahge	13 June 2024	Incumbent	BJP
