= Second Pema Khandu ministry =

Government of Arunachal Pradesh, India (2016)

- Ministry of Arunachal Pradesh
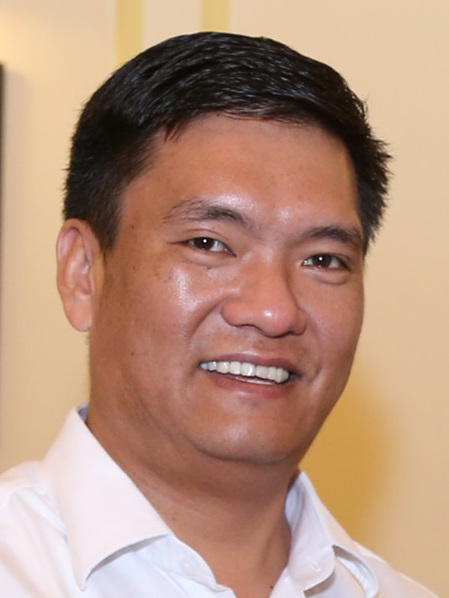
- Pema Khandu, Hon'ble Chief Minister of Arunachal Pradesh
- Date formed: 15 September 2016
- Date dissolved: 21 December 2016

People and organisations
- Head of state: Governor; B. D. Mishra
- Head of government: Pema Khandu
- No. of ministers: 12
- Total no. of members: 12
- Member parties: PPA
- Status in legislature: Majority

History
- Election: 2019
- Outgoing election: 2014
- Legislature term: 5 years
- Predecessor: First Pema Khandu ministry
- Successor: Third Pema Khandu ministry

This is a list of ministers from Pema Khandu cabinets starting from 15 September 2016 and ending on 21 December 2016. Khandu was the leader of PPA, who was sworn in the Chief Minister of Arunachal Pradesh on 15 September 2016.

== Council of Ministers ==
S.No	Name	Constituency	Department	Party
1.	Pema Khandu; Chief Minister	Mukto	Other departments not allocated to any Minister.	PPA
Deputy Chief Minister
2.	Chowna Mein	Chowkham	Finance.; Planning & Investment.; Power.; Non-Conventional Energy.; Resources & Tax.; Excise.; State Lotteries.; Economics & Statistics.	PPA
Cabinet Ministers
3.	Wangki Lowang	Namsang	Public Health Engineering.; Water Supply.; DoTCL.; Information Technology.	PPA
4.	Honchun Ngandam	Pongchau-Wakka	Rural Works.; Science & Technology.	PPA
5.	Kamlung Mossang	Miao	Urban Development.; Municipal Administration & Government Estates.; civil supplies & consumer affairs.; Geology and Mining.	PPA
6.	Alo Libang	Tuting-Yingkiong	Health & Family Welfare.; Social Welfare.; Women & Child Development.; Social Justice.; Empowerment.; Tribal Affairs.	PPA
7.	Bamang Felix	Nyapin	Home and Inter State Border Affairs.; Rural Development and Panchayati Raj.; Legislative Affairs.	PPA
8.	Tumke Bagra	Along West	Industries.; Skill Development.; Textile & Handicrafts.; Trade & Commerce.	PPA
9.	Mama Natung	Seppa West	Water Resources.; Youth Affairs and Sports.	PPA
10.	Tage Taki	Ziro-Hapoli	Agriculture.; Horticulture.; Animal Husbandary &; Veterinary.: Dairy Development.; Fisheries.	PPA
11.	Taba Tedir	Yachuli	Education.; Cultural Affairs.; Indigenous Affairs.	PPA
12.	Nakap Nalo	Nacho	Tourism.; Transport.; Civil Aviation.	PPA

== See also ==
- Government of Arunachal Pradesh
- Arunachal Pradesh Legislative Assembly
- Kalikho Pul cabinet
- First Pema Khandu ministry
- Third Pema Khandu ministry
