= 2015–2016 Arunachal Pradesh political crisis =

Indian state political crisis

- Duration: 1 April 2015 – 31 December 2016
- Location: Arunachal Pradesh, India
- Type: Political
- Cause: Political crisis due to rebellion within Indian National Congress
- Outcome: Nabam Tuki resigns as the chief minister; Indian National Congress lost the majority, brief rule of rebel fraction of INC, en masse switch over to PPA and later to BJP

Starting April 2015, the Indian state of Arunachal Pradesh underwent a political crisis. The Indian National Congress party in the Arunachal Pradesh Legislative Assembly was divided between supporters of the serving Chief Minister Nabam Tuki and supporters of Kalikho Pul. In 2016, the President's rule was imposed ending Tuki's tenure as the chief minister. In February 2016, Kalikho Pul became the Chief Minister when 14 disqualified MLAs were reinstated by the Supreme Court. On 13 July 2016, the Supreme Court quashed the Arunachal Pradesh Governor J.P. Rajkhowa’s order to advance the Assembly session from 14 January 2016 to 16 December 2015, which resulted in President's rule in Arunachal Pradesh. As a result, Tuki was restored as the Chief Minister of Arunachal Pradesh on 13 July 2016. But hours before proving majority, he resigned as the Chief Minister on 16 July 2016. He was succeeded by Pema Khandu, who in September 2016 left the INC and joined People's Party of Arunachal along with majority MLAs. He further joined BJP in December 2016 along with majority MLAs.

== Background ==
Indian National Congress (INC) leader Nabam Tuki succeeded Jarbom Gamlin as the Chief Minister of Arunachal Pradesh on 1 November 2011. His brother Nabam Rebia became the Speaker of Arunachal Pradesh Legislative Assembly. In April 2014 state assembly election, the Indian National Congress (INC) secured the majority with 42 seats in the 60-seat legislature and Nabam Tunki continued as the Chief Minister. In December 2014, Nabam Tuki dropped Kalikho Pul from his cabinet where he was the minister of Health and Family welfare.

== Crisis ==
In April 2015, Pul alleged financial mismanagement in the government. INC expelled him from the party citing activities against the party. On 1 June 2015, Jyoti Prasad Rajkhowa was appointed as the Governor of Arunachal Pradesh. The fifth session of legislative assembly concluded on 21 October 2015. The Governor ordered to summon the sixth session on 14 January 2016. During the same month, MLAs from the INC demanded resolution to remove Deputy Speaker of the legislative Assembly who had rebelled. In response, Bharatiya Janata Party (BJP) MLAs demanded resolution to remove the Speaker. On 9 December 2015, the Governor ordered to advance the sixth session from 14 January 2016 to 16 December 2015. On 15 December 2015, the Speaker issued notice disqualifying 14 of 21 INC MLAs who had rebelled against the party but the same day the notice was overturned by the Deputy Speaker. The Speaker decided to not commence the sixth session the next day which was cited illegal by the Deputy Speaker. The Tuki Government locked the assembly to not commence the session on 16 December 2015. The assembly met in a community hall which was attended by 33 MLAs. The MLA's passed a resolution to remove Nabam Rebia as the Speaker and a new Speaker was appointed. The next day, the community hall was razed so the rebel INC MLAs held a meeting in a hotel and voted to remove Tuki as the Chief Minister and appointed Kalikho Pul as the new Chief Minister. The same day Rebia moved to Gauhati High Court (HC) to keep the assembly and the related issues in abeyance.

In January 2016, the HC stayed the disqualification of 14 INC MLAs. On 6 January 2016, the Supreme Court of India (SC) agreed to hear the plea of Rebia. On 13 January 2016, the SC also ordered not to hold proceeding in Assembly till 18 January 2016. The next day, the SC referred the issue to the Constitution Bench. The SC started examination of the constitutional scope of discretionary powers of the Governor. In SC, INC told on 18 January 2016 that the Governor could not act on a resolution by opposition BJP MLAs and two other independent to advance the session. On 25 January 2016, INC also moved to SC on recommendation by the Governor for the President's Rule in Arunachal Pradesh. The Central Cabinet recommended the President's Rule the next day and it was imposed. The next day SC scrutinised the recommendation and sought the report of the Governor for such recommendation. On 28 January 2016, Nabam Tuki filed fresh plea in SC against the President's rule. The next day, the Central Government filed affidavit justifying the President's rule citing the breakdown in state.

On 1 February 2016, the SC recalled the notice which granted the immunity to the Governors in courts. The SC reviewed the powers of governor and examined the role. On 9 February 2016, the SC also rejected the plea of two rebel MLAs against the HC decision of upholding action of the then Speaker accepting their resignations. The Governor defended by responding that the Chief Minister and the Speaker were trying to remain in position despite losing majority in the assembly. The SC also rejected INC plea to stop swearing-in of the new Chief Minister and also uphold the HC's staying of disqualification of 14 rebel INC MLAs. The President's rule was lifted in the state on 19 February and the new government was formed under the Chief Minister Kalikho Pul. The SC reserved order on the power of governor on 22 February 2016.

On 13 July 2016, the SC termed the Governor's decision unconstitutional and ordered the restoration of INC government. The Acting Governor Tathagata Roy asked the restored Chief Minister Nabam Tuki to prove majority in the assembly on 16 July 2016. Tuki resigned a few hours before proving the majority. He was succeeded by rebel INC MLA Pema Khandu, son of former Chief Minister Dorjee Khandu who proved majority in assembly on 20th.

On 9 August 2016, the former Chief Minister Kalikho Pul was found dead in his home.

On 16 September 2016, Pema Khandu quit INC along with 43 INC MLAs and joined the People's Party of Arunachal (PPA). Nabam Tuki, Khandu's predecessor, was the only MLA left with INC. PPA was the part of North-East Democratic Alliance which supported BJP-led National Democratic Alliance.

On 22 September 2016, the Governor Rajkhowa was dismissed by the President as he refused to quit as desired by the centre.

Dasanglu Pul, the third wife of former Chief Minister Phul, won the byepolls held following Pul's death. She was elected as the MLA of BJP.

On 29 December 2016, Pema Khandu and six other MLAs were dismissed from the PPA by the PPA president for activities against the party, and four more MLAs were dismissed on 1 January 2017. Khandu along with 33 other MLAs left PPA and joined BJP. He continued as the Chief Minister as the BJP had 47 MLAs in the assembly including the Speaker. PPA had 10 MLAs while INC had 3 MLAs. Later two more MLAs left INC and joined BJP.

PPA filed the case in the HC in January 2016.

== Chief Ministers during the period ==
S No.	Name	Term		Party (Note: This column only names the chief minister's party. The state government he heads may be a complex coalition of several parties and independents; these are not listed here.)	Tenure (days)
6	Jarbom Gamlin	5 May 2011	1 November 2011	Indian National Congress	181
7	Nabam Tuki	1 November 2011	26 January 2016	Indian National Congress	1547
–	Vacant (Note: President's rule may be imposed when the "government in a state is not able to function as per the Constitution", which often happens because no party or coalition has a majority in the assembly. When President's rule is in force in a state, its council of ministers stands dissolved. The office of chief minister thus lies vacant, and the administration is taken over by the governor, who functions on behalf of the central government. At times, the legislative assembly also stands dissolved.) (President's rule)	26 January 2016	19 February 2016	N/A	24
8	Kalikho Pul	19 February 2016	13 July 2016	People's Party of Arunachal	145
(7)	Nabam Tuki	13 July 2016	17 July 2016	Indian National Congress	4
9	Pema Khandu	17 July 2016	16 September 2016	Indian National Congress	167
9	Pema Khandu	16 September 2016	31 December 2016	People's Party of Arunachal	167
9	Pema Khandu	31 December 2016	31 December 2016	Bharatiya Janata Party	167
