= 1990 Arunachal Pradesh Legislative Assembly election =

- 27 February 1990

All 60 seats in the Arunachal Pradesh Legislative Assembly 31 seats needed for a majority
- Registered: 511,154
- Turnout: 72.84%
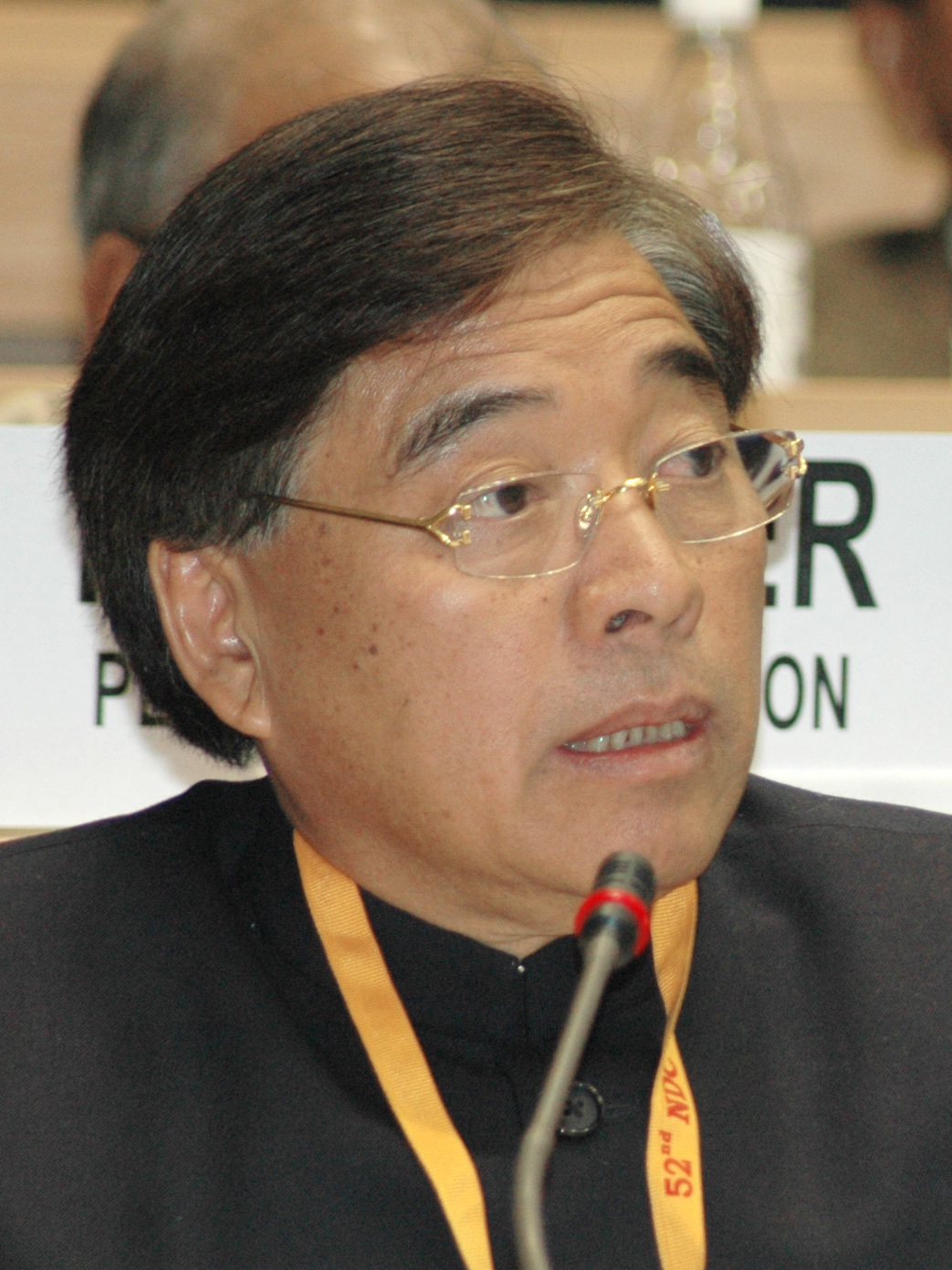

	Majority party	Minority party
Leader	Gegong Apang
Party	INC	JD
Seats before	21
Seats won	37	11
Seat change	▲16	▲11
CM before election
Gegong Apang
INC
Elected CM
Gegong Apang
INC

The 4th Arunachal Pradesh Legislative Assembly election was held on the 27th February 1990. The Indian National Congress won the popular vote and a majority of seats and Gegong Apang was re-elected as Chief Minister of Arunachal Pradesh.

The election was held in 1,528 polling stations and on an average there were 334 electors per polling station.

== Election results ==
NO. OF VALID VOTES : 349098

NO. OF VOTES REJECTED: 7,191 ( 2.02% of Total Votes Polled)

NATIONAL PARTIES	CONTESTED	WON	FD	VOTES	%	SEATS
1. INC	59	37	0	154463	44.25%	44.85%
2. JD	52	11	1	116383	33.34%	36.21%
3. JNP(JP)	7	1	4	7952	2.28%	14.77%
INDEPENDENTS						
4. IND	52	11	21	70300	20.14%	32.72%
Grand Total :	170	60	26	349098		

=== Results by constituency ===
Winner, runner-up, voter turnout, and victory margin in every constituency
Assembly Constituency		Turnout	Winner				Runner Up				Margin
#k	Names	%	Candidate	Party	Votes	%	Candidate	Party	Votes	%	Margin
1	Lumla	81.21%	Karma Wangchu	INC	2,798	63.12%	Rinchin Norbu Gengla	JD	1,635	36.88%	1,163
2	Tawang	-	Thupten Tempa	INC	Elected Unopposed						
3	Mukto	-	Dorjee Khandu	INC	Elected Unopposed						
4	Dirang	75.54%	Lobsang Tsering	Independent	3,252	47.56%	Tsering Gyurme	INC	2,225	32.54%	1,027
5	Kalaktang	80.1%	Rinchin Khandu Khrimey	INC	3,388	65.67%	Dorjee Tsering	JD	1,771	34.33%	1,617
6	Thrizino-Buragaon	77.42%	Sinam Dususow	INC	2,578	61.03%	Nima Tsering Khrime	Independent	1,646	38.97%	932
7	Bomdila	72.41%	Japu Deru	INC	2,839	58.57%	Rinchin Kharu	JD	2,008	41.43%	831
8	Bameng	74.64%	Dongle Sonam	Independent	2,895	41.49%	Mai Sonam	INC	2,501	35.85%	394
9	Chayangtajo	75.42%	Kameng Dolo	INC	3,364	50.14%	Ropo Yangfo	JD	3,345	49.86%	19
10	Seppa East	74.22%	Mepe Dada	JD	2,461	51.22%	Atum Welly	INC	2,266	47.16%	195
11	Seppa West	85.52%	Hari Natung	Independent	1,800	45.21%	Matum Rime	JD	1,263	31.73%	537
12	Pakke-Kessang	80.28%	Dera Natung	INC	1,680	47.66%	Natung Tacheng	JD	1,240	35.18%	440
13	Itanagar	51.46%	Lichi Legi	JD	6,494	45.05%	Techi Takur	INC	4,978	34.54%	1,516
14	Doimukh	70.32%	Ngurang Tazap	INC	2,595	37.52%	T.C. Teli	JP	2,452	35.45%	143
15	Sagalee	81.09%	Taba Haniya	JD	3,210	51.97%	Nabam Tuki	INC	2,967	48.03%	243
16	Yachuli	75.67%	Neelam Taram	INC	5,683	77.07%	Joram Tajing	JD	1,691	22.93%	3,992
17	Ziro–Hapoli	54.27%	Padi Yubbe	Independent	4,237	44.71%	Nani Ribya	Independent	2,900	30.6%	1,337
18	Palin	60.57%	Dugi Tajik	JD	2,513	42.74%	Dolang Taging	INC	1,964	33.4%	549
19	Nyapin	74.91%	Tadar Taniang	INC	2,241	31.43%	Kamen Ringu	JD	2,141	30.03%	100
20	Tali	61.71%	Zara Tata	JP	2,095	51.5%	Sorom Tatup	INC	1,246	30.63%	849
21	Koloriang	-	Chera Talo	INC	Elected Unopposed						
22	Nacho	64.49%	Tanga Byaling	Independent	2,337	41.%	Taring Dui	INC	2,034	35.68%	303
23	Taliha	60.72%	Tara Payeng	JD	2,784	50.87%	Punji Mara	INC	2,689	49.13%	95
24	Daporijo	63.16%	Tadak Dulom	INC	4,128	53.45%	Daklo Nidak	Independent	2,197	28.45%	1,931
25	Raga	81.9%	Talo Mugli	INC	4,155	52.99%	Boa Tamo	JD	2,418	30.84%	1,737
26	Dumporijo	79.96%	Larbin Nasi	Independent	3,247	46.24%	Tomo Riba	JD	2,116	30.13%	1,131
27	Liromoba	78.74%	Lijum Ronya	INC	3,194	52.46%	Jarbom Gamlin	JD	2,895	47.54%	299
28	Likabali	70.03%	Rima Taipodia	JD	2,735	53.08%	Kardu Taipodia	INC	2,418	46.92%	317
29	Basar	78.66%	Todak Basar	INC	5,969	60.9%	Tomo Riba	JD	3,832	39.1%	2,137
30	Along West	78.74%	Kirge Eshi	JD	3,313	53.94%	Kento Ete	INC	2,829	46.06%	484
31	Along East	62.14%	Doi Ado	INC	3,296	53.97%	Togum Lollen	JD	2,811	46.03%	485
32	Rumgong	81.5%	Tamiyo Taga	INC	2,778	38.26%	Karma Jerang	Independent	1,954	26.91%	824
33	Mechuka	84.23%	Pasang Wangchuk Sona	Independent	2,395	51.09%	Tadik Chije	Independent	2,125	45.33%	270
34	Tuting–Yingkiong	82.83%	Gegong Apang	INC	6,346	81.02%	Bani Danggen	JD	1,487	18.98%	4,859
35	Pangin	84.9%	Tahung Tatak	INC	2,520	33.16%	Tanyong Tatak	Independent	2,501	32.91%	19
36	Nari-Koyu	83.12%	Tako Eabi	JD	1,460	50.1%	Tanya Dabi	INC	1,454	49.9%	6
37	Pasighat West	83.17%	Tarung Pabin	INC	3,147	53.3%	Tatong Padung	JD	2,757	46.7%	390
38	Pasighat East	70.17%	Ninong Ering	Independent	2,830	35.53%	Bakin Pertin	JD	2,746	34.48%	84
39	Mebo	77.68%	Lombo Tayeng	INC	2,232	46.48%	Maliyang Perme	JD	1,816	37.82%	416
40	Mariyang-Geku	85.58%	Kabang Borang	INC	3,737	55.09%	Bakin Pertin	JD	3,047	44.91%	690
41	Anini	73.08%	Rajesh Tacho	INC	970	36.62%	Tade Tacho	Independent	836	31.56%	134
42	Dambuk	74.32%	Bassu Perme	JD	3,314	53.23%	Makpel Pertin	INC	2,912	46.77%	402
43	Roing	70.87%	Mutchu Mithi	INC	3,781	61.86%	Namo Lingi	JD	2,036	33.31%	1,745
44	Tezu	68.09%	Nakul Chai	JD	3,850	52.85%	Sobeng Tayang	INC	3,299	45.28%	551
45	Hayuliang	75.66%	Khapriso Krong	Independent	2,869	43.42%	Piola Kri	Independent	2,008	30.39%	861
46	Chowkham	77.66%	Sokio Dellang	Independent	1,762	31.25%	Chowna Mein	JD	1,422	25.22%	340
47	Namsai	74.41%	Chow Pingthika Namchoom	INC	5,479	59.86%	Chau Khouk Manpoong	JD	3,254	35.55%	2,225
48	Lekang	87.39%	Omem Moyong Deori	INC	4,176	51.1%	Chowna Mein	JD	3,996	48.9%	180
49	Bordumsa-Diyun	77.39%	C. C. Singpho	INC	2,500	43.68%	Innem Gam Singpho	JD	1,639	28.64%	861
50	Miao	71.06%	Samchom Ngemu	INC	3,582	56.31%	Kittang Kitnal Muklom	JD	2,779	43.69%	803
51	Nampong	73.29%	Komoli Mosang	INC	1,828	37.06%	Izmir Tikhak	Independent	1,608	32.6%	220
52	Changlang South	80.1%	Tengam Ngemu	INC	1,860	68.13%	Khongmat Tangha	JD	870	31.87%	990
53	Changlang North	71.39%	Wangnia Pongte	INC	2,028	41.49%	Thinghaap Taiju	JD	1,474	30.16%	554
54	Namsang	76.87%	Wangpha Lowang	INC	1,772	40.2%	Ngongbey Kanglom	JD	1,628	36.93%	144
55	Khonsa East	71.35%	T. L. Rajkumar	INC	3,245	64.13%	Tonhangtongluk	JD	1,815	35.87%	1,430
56	Khonsa West	85.28%	Sijen Kongkang	INC	2,361	41.1%	Hangliam Sumnyan	Independent	1,743	30.34%	618
57	Borduria–Bagapani	78.17%	Lowangcha Wanglat	JD	2,932	62.4%	W.Ajay Rajkumar	INC	1,767	37.6%	1,165
58	Kanubari	85.42%	Noksong Boham	INC	1,368	30.21%	Nokram Wangham	JD	1,267	27.98%	101
59	Longding–Pumao	72.2%	Langfu Lukham	Independent	1,692	31.27%	Tingpong Wanghan	JD	1,672	30.9%	20
60	Pongchau-Wakka	66.38%	Anok Wangsa	INC	2,016	28.65%	Wangma Wangsa	Independent	1,874	26.63%	142
