= Pul ministry =

Government of Arunachal Pradesh, India (2016)

- Ministry of Arunachal Pradesh
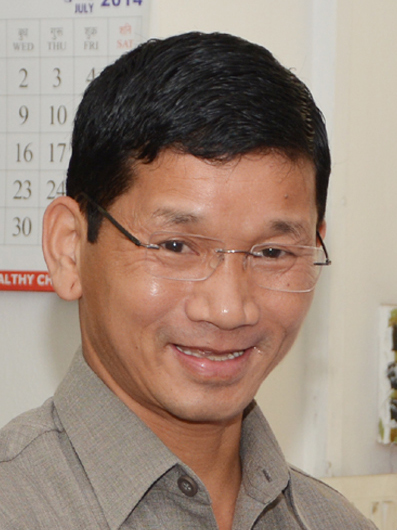
- Kalikho Pul, Hon'ble Chief Minister of Arunachal Pradesh
- Date formed: 19 February 2016
- Date dissolved: 13 July 2016

People and organisations
- Head of state: Governor Jyoti Prasad Rajkhowa
- Head of government: Kalikho Pul
- No. of ministers: 8
- Total no. of members: 8
- Member parties: INC
- Status in legislature: Majority

History
- Legislature term: 5 years
- Predecessor: First Nabam Tuki ministry
- Successor: Second Nabam Tuki ministry

This is a list of ministers from Kalikho Pul cabinets starting from 19 February 2016 to 13 July 2016. Kalikho Pul was the leader of People's Party of Arunachal was sworn in the Chief Minister of Arunachal Pradesh in 19 February 2016.

== Ministers ==
| SI No. | Name | Constituency | Department | Party |
|---|---|---|---|---|
| 1. | Kalikho Pul, Chief Minister | Hayuliang | Minister of Finance, Planning, Health and Family Welfare, Forests and Environment & Department Not Assigned To Any Cabinet Minister | People's Party of Arunachal |
| 2. | Kameng Dolo, Deputy Chief Minister | Pakke-Kessang | Minister of Home, Rural Development, Panchayati Raj, Textiles and Handicrafts. | People's Party of Arunachal |
| 3. | Chowna Mein, Deputy Chief Minister | Lekang | Minister of Public Works Department, Social Welfare and Child Development, Social Justice Empowerment, Tribal Affairs, Animal Husbandry and Veterinary. | People's Party of Arunachal |
| 4. | Tenzing Norbu Thongdok | Kalaktang | Minister of Power and Non-conventional Energy Resources. | People's Party of Arunachal |
| 5. | Kumar Waii | Bameng | Minister of Rural Works Development, Agriculture, Labour and Employment. | People's Party of Arunachal |
| 6. | Wanglin Lowangdong | Borduria-Bagapani | Minister of Education, Parliamentary Affairs, and the Department of Tirap, Changlang, and Longding. | People's Party of Arunachal |
| 7. | Kamlung Mossang | Miao | Minister of Water Resources, Mines, Trade and Commerce. | People's Party of Arunachal |
| 8. | Lombo Tayeng | Mebo | Minister of Public Health Engineering and Water Supply, Libraries. | People's Party of Arunachal |

== See also ==
- Kalikho Pul
- 2015–16 Arunachal Pradesh political crisis
- Government of Arunachal Pradesh
- Arunachal Pradesh Legislative Assembly
- North-East Democratic Alliance
- People's Party of Arunachal
