= First Pema Khandu ministry =

Government of Arunachal Pradesh, India (2016)

- Ministry of Arunachal Pradesh
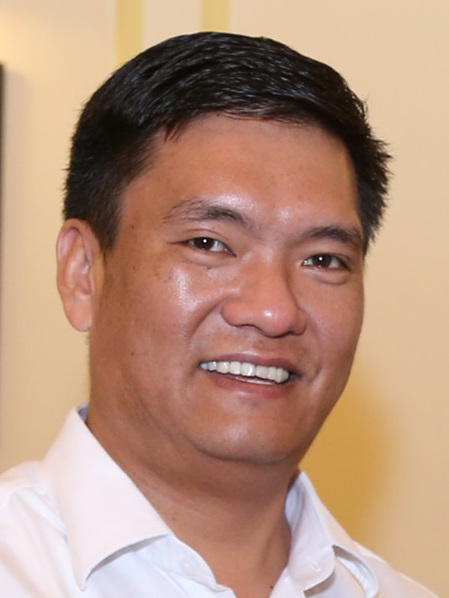
- Pema Khandu, Hon'ble Chief Minister of Arunachal Pradesh
- Date formed: 17 July 2016
- Date dissolved: 15 September 2016

People and organisations
- Head of state: Governor B. D. Mishra
- Head of government: Pema Khandu
- No. of ministers: 11
- Ministers removed: 4
- Total no. of members: 11
- Member parties: INC
- Status in legislature: Majority

History
- Legislature term: 5 years
- Predecessor: Second Nabam Tuki ministry
- Successor: Pema Khandu second ministry

This is a list of ministers from Pema Khandu cabinets starting from 17 July 2016. Pema Khandu is the leader of INC, who was sworn in the Chief Minister of Arunachal Pradesh on 17 July 2016 as INC's Chief Minister.

== Chief Minister & Cabinet Ministers ==
| SI No. | Name | Constituency | Department | Party |
|---|---|---|---|---|
| 1. | Pema Khandu, Chief Minister | | Department Not Assigned To Any Cabinet Minister | INC |
| 2. | Chowna Mein, Deputy Chief Minister | | Minister of Finance, Planning and Public Works Department. | INC |
| 3. | Nabam Rebia | | Minister of Urban Development, Town Planning, Housing, Urban Local Bodies, Law and Justice. | INC |
| 4. | Kumar Waii | | Minister of Rural Works Department, Labour and Employment. | INC |
| 5. | Tumke Bagra | | Minister of Industries, Textiles and Handicrafts, Cooperation. | INC |
| 6. | Kamlung Mossang | | Minister of Water Resources Development, Geology and Mining. | INC |
| 7. | Wangki Lowang | | Minister of Tirap, Changlang and Longding (DoTCL), Agriculture, Trade and Commerce. | INC |
| 8. | Honchun Ngandam | | Minister of Education, Libraries. | INC |
| 9. | Dr. Mahesh Chai | | Minister of Animal Husbandry and Veterinary, Dairy Development, Fisheries. | INC |
| 10. | Bamang Felix | | Minister of Public Health Engineering Department, Disaster Management, Parliamentary Affairs. | INC |
| 11. | Alo Libang | | Minister of Panchayat Raj and Rural Development. | INC |

== Former Ministers ==
- Jomde Kena - Minister of Transport, Supply and Transport, Legal Metrology and Consumer Affairs
- Rajesh Tacho - Minister of Animal Husbandry and Veterinary, Dairy Development, Fisheries
- Tanga Byaling - Minister of Rural Development, Panchayat
- Takam Pario - Minister of Public Health Engineering, Disaster Management

== See also ==
- Government of Arunachal Pradesh
- Arunachal Pradesh Legislative Assembly
- Kalikho Pul cabinet
