= Tathagata Roy =

Indian politician

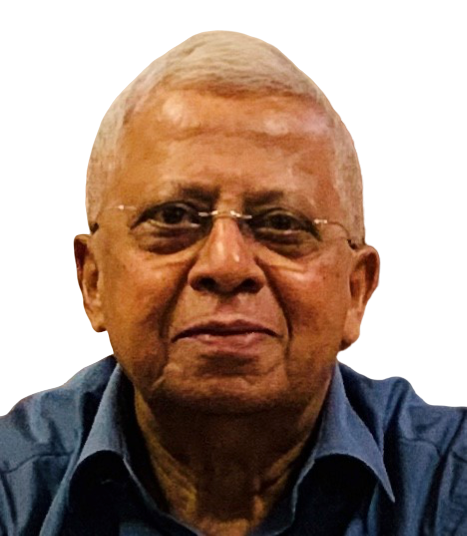
- Official portrait, 2020

18th Governor of Meghalaya
- In office 27 January 2020 – 18 August 2020
- Chief Minister: Conrad Sangma
- Preceded by: R. N. Ravi
- Succeeded by: Satya Pal Malik
- In office 25 August 2018 – 18 December 2019
- Chief Minister: Conrad Sangma
- Preceded by: Ganga Prasad
- Succeeded by: R. N. Ravi

16th Governor of Tripura
- In office 20 May 2015 – 25 August 2018
- Chief Minister: Manik Sarkar; Biplab Kumar Deb
- Preceded by: Padmanabha Acharya
- Succeeded by: Kaptan Singh Solanki

16th Governor of Arunachal Pradesh
- In office 10 July 2016 – 12 August 2016
- Chief Minister: Kalikho Pul; Nabam Tuki; Pema Khandu
- Preceded by: Jyoti Prasad Rajkhowa
- Succeeded by: Jyoti Prasad Rajkhowa

6th State President of Bharatiya Janata Party - West Bengal
- In office 2002–2006
- Preceded by: Ashim Kumar Ghosh
- Succeeded by: Sukumar Banerjee

Member of National Executive Committee, Bharatiya Janata Party
- In office 2002–2015

Personal details
- Born: 14 September 1945 (age 81) Calcutta, Bengal Presidency, British India
- Party: Bharatiya Janata Party
- Relatives: Saugata Roy (brother)
- Education: University of Calcutta (L.L.B); IIEST Shibpur (B.E.)

Tathagata Roy (born 14 September 1945) is an Indian politician who served as the Governor of Tripura from 2015 to 2018 and the Governor of Meghalaya from 2018 to 2020. He has served as the president of the West Bengal state unit of Bharatiya Janata Party and as a member of the BJP National Executive.

Roy briefly had additional charge of the office of the Governor of Arunachal Pradesh from July 2016 till August 2016, during which he handled the ouster of Chief Minister Kalikho Pul following a Supreme Court judgement, and swore in Pema Khandu as the new Chief Minister. An engineer by training, Roy is a former professor of construction engineering and the founder-head of the department at Jadavpur University.

== Life and works ==
Tathagata Roy was born on 14 September 1945 in Calcutta, Bengal Presidency, British India (present-day West Bengal, India) to Debesh Chandra Roy and Anila (née Dutta). He had a distinguished academic career, having been ranked 6th in the Higher secondary examination of West Bengal Board of Secondary Education as a student of St. Lawrence High School, Kolkata and a recipient of the Jagadis Bose National Science Talent Search Scholarship. He studied Civil Engineering in Bengal Engineering College Sibpur (currently Indian Institute of Engineering Science and Technology, Shibpur), when it was affiliated with the University of Calcutta. Later he joined Indian Railways Service of Engineers. He worked as General Manager, RITES and as Chief Engineer - Design of Metro Railways, Calcutta. He also holds a Law Degree of Calcutta University.

Roy took voluntary retirement from the Railways in 1990. He then joined Jadavpur University as professor and founder head of the Department of Construction Engineering at its new campus at Salt Lake, Calcutta. He is a former Chairman Board of Governors of TTTI Calcutta (2000 to 2005). He is a fellow of the Institution of Engineers and life member of the Indian Council of Arbitration. He functioned as an arbitrator in a number of engineering contracts until he was appointed Governor of Tripura.

Roy was felicitated as an 'Eminent Engineering Personality' by the Institution of Engineers (India) at the Engineering Congress held at Guwahati in December 2015 and awarded the distinguished Alumni award by Indian Institute of Engineering Science and Technology, Shibpur, formerly Bengal Engineering College Sibpur during the Second Annual Convocation of the institute on 4 March 2016. He was also conferred the degree of Doctor of Letters (Honoris Causa) by the Shri Jagdishprasad Jhabarmull Tibrewala University, Vidyanagari, Jhunjhunu, Rajasthan, at a special convocation at Mumbai in May 2016. He was further conferred the degree of Doctor of Engineering (Honoris Causa) by the National Institute of Technology, Agartala, Tripura, at the convocation in November 2016.

== Politics ==
Roy was attracted towards Hindutva, the ideology of Hindu nationalism and joined the Rashtriya Swayamsevak Sangh (RSS) in 1986. After leaving government service he joined the BJP in 1990. He replaced Ashim Ghosh as president of the West Bengal state unit of the BJP in 2002 and was succeeded by Sukumar Banerjee in 2006.

Roy stood as a candidate for election to the Lok Sabha in 2009, standing in the North Kolkata constituency of West Bengal. He did not win. He stood as the BJP candidate in the Kolkata Dakshin (South Kolkata) parliamentary constituency for the 2014 Indian general election, earning 25.29% of the total votes polled. He was appointed Governor of Tripura on 12 May 2015. He was transferred and appointed Governor of Meghalaya in August 2018. He served till December 2019 and, after a brief medical leave, again from January 2020 until 18 August 2020 completing his five-year tenure on gubernatorial post, handing over the charge to Satya Pal Malik.

== Governorship ==
Roy was appointed as the Governor of Tripura on 20 May 2015. He took leaves from 20 September 2015 to 20 November 2015, from 15 June 2015.

On 27 August 2018, he was appointed as the Governor of Meghalaya, following the end of Ganga Prasad’s term. He served until 18 August 2020.

== Publications ==
Roy writes extensively, mostly socio-political articles, both in English and in his native Bengali. He has been published in The Statesman, BJP Today, Desh (Bengali fortnightly) and several others. He has authored seven books:

- Bampontha Bhayankari: Banglay o Bideshe (Bengali) (Mitra & Ghosh, Kolkata, 2020)
- Bharatkeshari Yugpurush Syamaprasad (Bengali) (Mitra & Ghosh, Kolkata, 2018)
- Ja Chhilo Amar Desh (Bengali) (Mitra & Ghosh, Kolkata, 2016)
- My People, Uprooted: The Exodus of Hindus from East Pakistan and Bangladesh (Synergy Books India, New Delhi, 2016), earlier published under the title A Suppressed Chapter in History: The Exodus of Hindus from East Pakistan and Bangladesh, 1947-2006, (Bookwell, Delhi, 2007)
- "Syama Prasad Mookerjee: Life and Times", (Penguin/Viking, Delhi, 2018), earlier published under title The Life and Times of Dr. Syama Prasad Mookerjee, (Prabhat Prakashan, Delhi, 2012). Also translated into Hindi under title Apratim Nayak Dr. Syama Prasad Mookerjee (Prabhat Prakashan, Delhi, 2012)
- Tathagata Rayer Nirbachito Probondho Songroho (Bengali), Vivekananda Sahitya Kendra, Kolkata, 2008
- Engineering Contracts in India: Law, Practice and Management, (Bharat Book Agency, Calcutta, 1990)

== Family ==
Roy is the elder brother of Saugata Roy, the All India Trinamool Congress MP and former Minister of State for Urban Development. He is married to Anuradha, who taught English at B.K.C. College, Kolkata. They have two daughters, Malini (Roy) and Madhura (Khedekar), both of whom are married and live in the United States.

Political offices
Preceded by Padmanabha Acharya	Governor of Tripura; 20 May 2015 - 25 August 2018	Succeeded by Kaptan Singh Solanki
Preceded by Jyoti Prasad Rajkhowa	Governor of Arunachal Pradesh; 10 July 2016 - 12 August 2016	Succeeded by Jyoti Prasad Rajkhowa; Additional Charge
Preceded by Ganga Prasad	Governor of Meghalaya; 25 August 2018 - 18 December 2019	Succeeded by R. N. Ravi; Additional Charge
Preceded by R. N. Ravi; Additional Charge	Governor of Meghalaya; 27 January 2020 - 18 August 2020	Succeeded by Satya Pal Malik
