= Fourth Pema Khandu ministry =

Government of Arunachal Pradesh, India (2019–2024)

- 17th Ministry of Arunachal Pradesh
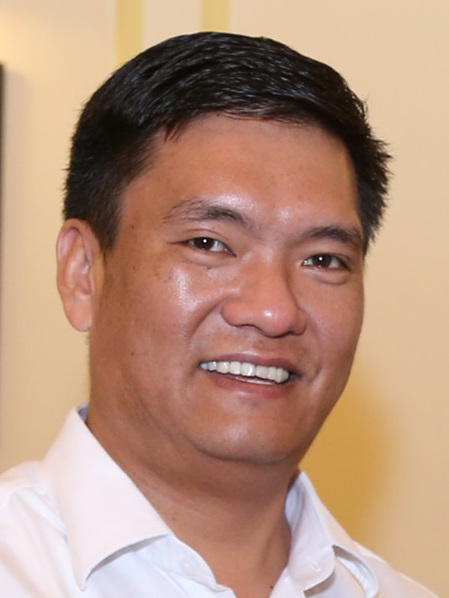
- Pema Khandu; Hon'ble Chief Minister of Arunachal Pradesh
- Date formed: 29 May 2019
- Date dissolved: 12 June 2024

People and organisations
- Governor: B. D. Mishra (until 15 February 2023); Kaiwalya Trivikram Parnaik (since 16 February 2023)
- Chief Minister: Pema Khandu (BJP)
- Member parties: BJP
- Status in legislature: Government (51) NDA (51): BJP (48); NPP (2); IND (1); Opposition (1) INC (1) Vacant (8): Vacant (8)
- Opposition party: None
- Opposition leader: Vacant

History
- Election: 2019
- Legislature terms: 5 years, 14 days
- Predecessor: Third Pema Khandu ministry
- Successor: Fifth Pema Khandu Ministry

This is the Cabinet of the state of Arunachal Pradesh, India, which forms the executive branch of the government of Arunachal Pradesh. Along with the Chief Minister, there is a Deputy Chief Minister and 10 Cabinet Ministers.

== Cabinet Ministers ==
Sr. No.	Name	Office	Portfolio	Constituency	Party
1.	Pema Khandu	Chief Minister	General Administration; Personnel; Public Works; Other departments not allocated to any Minister.	Mukto	BJP
2.	Chowna Mein	Deputy Chief Minister	Finance; Power; Non Conventional Energy Resources; Tax & Excise; State Lotteries; Economics & Statistics	Chowkham	BJP
3.	Honchun Ngandam	Cabinet Minister	Rural Works; Science Technology	Pongchau-Wakka	BJP
4.	Wangki Lowang	Cabinet Minister	Public Health Engineering; Tirap, Changlang Longding; Information Technology	Namsang	BJP
5.	Kamlun Mossang	Cabinet Minister	Urban Development; Municipal Administration; Government Estates; Civil Supplies Consumer Affairs; Geology & Mining	Miao	BJP
6.	Bamang Felix	Cabinet Minister	Home Inter State Border Affairs; Rural Development; Panchayati Raj; Parliamentary Affairs; Information Public Relations	Nyapin	BJP
7.	Alo Libang	Cabinet Minister	Health; Family Welfare; Women Child Development; Social Justice and Empowerment; Tribal Affairs	Tuting–Yingkiong	BJP
8.	Tumke Bagra	Cabinet Minister	Industries; Skill Development; Textile & Handicrafts; Trade & Commerce; Labour & Employment; Co-operation	Along West	BJP
9.	Mama Natung	Cabinet Minister	Youth Affairs Sports; Water Resources; Forests; Environment Climate Change	Seppa West	BJP
10.	Taba Tedir	Cabinet Minister	Education; Cultural Affairs; Indigenous Affairs	Yachuli	BJP
11.	Tage Taki	Cabinet Minister	Agriculture; Horticulture; Animal Husbandry; Dairy Development; Fisheries	Ziro-Hapoli	BJP
12.	Nakap Nalo	Cabinet Minister	Tourism; Transport; Civil Aviation; Land Management	Nacho	BJP
