= Third Pema Khandu ministry =

Government of Arunachal Pradesh, India (2016–2019)

- Ministry of Arunachal Pradesh
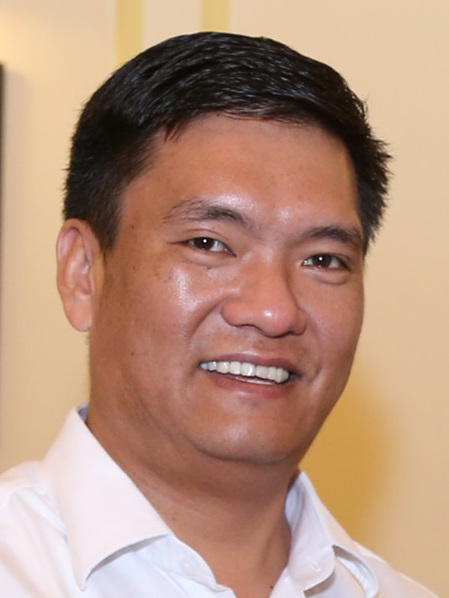
- Pema Khandu, Hon'ble Chief Minister of Arunachal Pradesh
- Date formed: 29 December 2016
- Date dissolved: 29 May 2019

People and organisations
- Head of state: Governor B. D. Mishra
- Head of government: Pema Khandu
- Deputy head of government: Chowna Mein
- No. of ministers: 11
- Ministers removed: 4
- Total no. of members: 11
- Member parties: BJP
- Status in legislature: Majority

History
- Legislature term: 5 years
- Predecessor: Second Pema Khandu ministry
- Successor: Fourth Pema Khandu Ministry

This is a list of ministers of Pema Khandu's cabinet from 29 December 2016 to 29 May 2019. Pema Khandu was sworn in as BJP's Chief Minister of Arunachal Pradesh on 29 December 2016.

== Chief Minister & Cabinet Ministers ==
SI No.	Name	Constituency	Department	Party
1.	Pema Khandu, Chief Minister		Department Not Assigned To Any Cabinet Minister	BJP
2.	Chowna Mein, Deputy Chief Minister		Minister of Finance, Planning and Public Works Department.	BJP
3.	Nabam Rebia		Minister of Urban Development, Town Planning, Housing, Urban Local Bodies, Law and Justice.	BJP
4.	Kumar Waii		Minister of Rural Works Department, Labour and Employment.	BJP
5.	Tumke Bagra		Minister of Industries, Textiles and Handicrafts, Cooperation.	BJP
6.	Kamlung Mossang		Minister of Water Resources Development, Geology and Mining.	BJP
7.	Wangki Lowang		Minister of Tirap, Changlang and Longding (DoTCL), Agriculture, Trade and Commerce.	BJP
8.	Honchun Ngandam		Minister of Education, Libraries.	BJP
9.	Dr. Mahesh Chai		Minister of Animal Husbandry and Veterinary, Dairy Development, Fisheries.	BJP
10.	Bamang Felix		Minister of Public Health Engineering Department, Disaster Management, Parliamentary Affairs.	BJP
11.	Alo Libang		Minister of Panchayat Raj and Rural Development.	BJP

== Former Ministers ==
- Jomde Kena - Minister of Transport, Supply and Transport, Legal Metrology and Consumer Affairs
- Rajesh Tacho - Minister of Animal Husbandry and Veterinary, Dairy Development, Fisheries
- Tanga Byaling - Minister of Rural Development, Panchayat
- Takam Pario - Minister of Public Health Engineering, Disaster Management
