= List of deputy chief ministers of Arunachal Pradesh =

Member of the Cabinet of Arunachal Pradesh Government

Deputy Chief Minister of Arunachal Pradesh
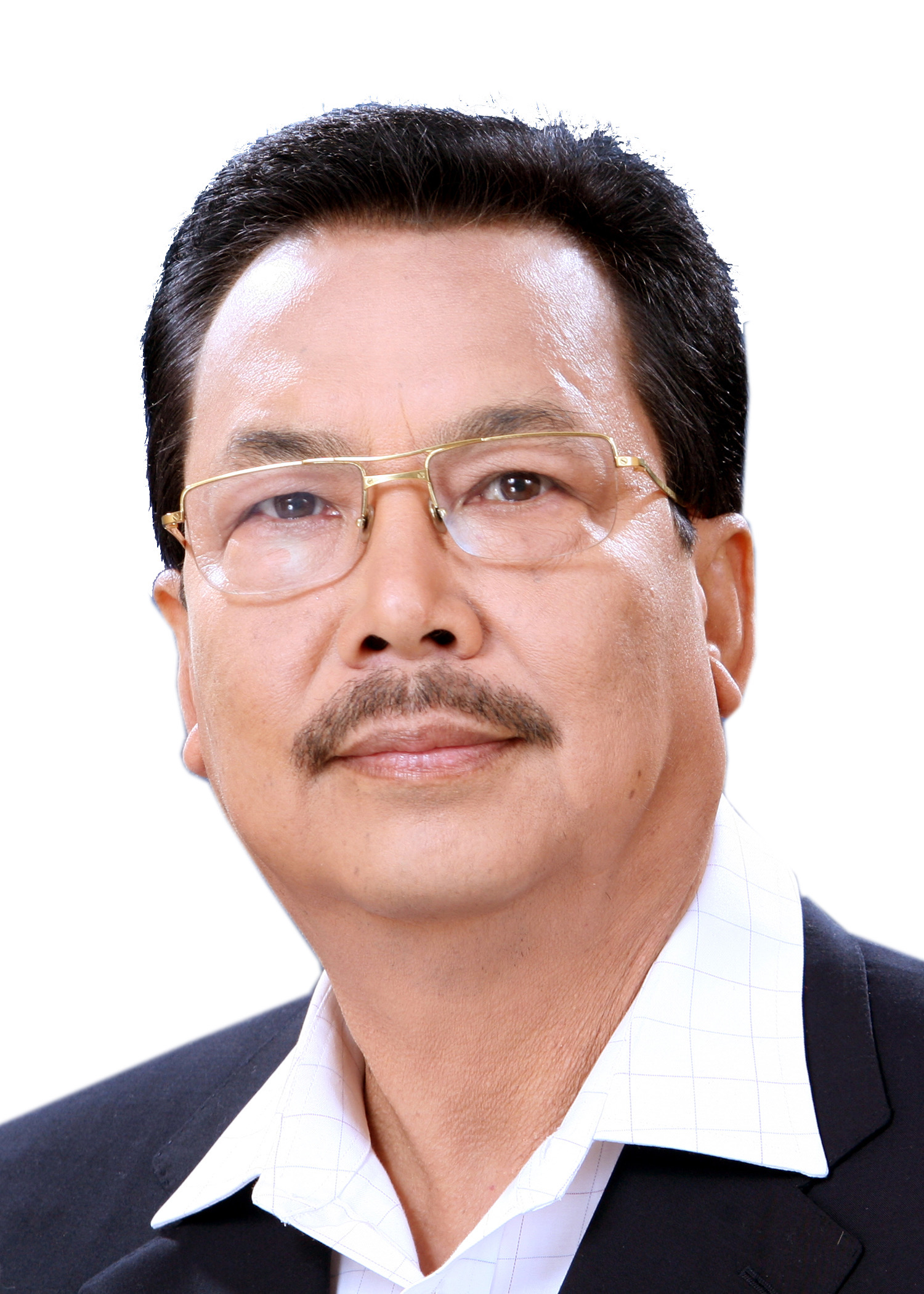
- Incumbent; Chowna Mein since 19 February 2016
- Government of Arunachal Pradesh
- Style: The Honourable (Formal); Mr. Deputy Chief Minister (Informal)
- Type: Deputy Head of Government
- Status: Deputy Leader of the Executive
- Abbreviation: DCM
- Member of: Cabinet; Arunachal Pradesh Legislative Assembly
- Reports to: Chief Minister of Arunachal Pradesh
- Seat: Arunachal Pradesh Secretariat, Shimla
- Nominator: Members of the Government of Arunachal Pradesh in Arunachal Pradesh Legislative Assembly
- Appointer: Governor of Arunachal Pradesh
- Term length: At the confidence of the assembly; Deputy Chief minister's term is for 5 years and is subject to no term limits.
- Inaugural holder: Kameng Dolo

The deputy chief minister of Arunachal Pradesh is the senior most cabinet member of the state government who serves as the de facto second head of the state. He is the second highest ranking executive authority of the state's council of ministers. The current deputy chief minister of Arunachal Pradesh is Chowna Mein, serving in office since 19 February 2016.

The position of deputy chief minister is not explicitly defined or mentioned in the Constitution of India. However, the Supreme Court of India has stated that the appointment of deputy chief ministers is not unconstitutional. The court has clarified that a deputy chief minister, for all practical purposes, remains a minister in the council of ministers headed by the chief minister and does not draw a higher salary or perks compared to other ministers.

== List ==
#	Portrait	Name	Constituency	Term of office			Assembly (election)	Chief Minister	Party
1		Kameng Dolo	Chayangtajo	3 August 2003	7 July 2004	339 days	6th (1999)	Gegong Apang	Arunachal Congress
1		Kameng Dolo	Chayangtajo	3 August 2003	7 July 2004	339 days	6th (1999)	Gegong Apang	Bharatiya Janata Party
1		Kameng Dolo	Pakke-Kessang	19 February 2016	13 July 2016	145 days	9th (2014)	Kalikho Pul	People's Party of Arunachal
2		Chowna Mein	Lekang	19 February 2016	13 July 2016	145 days	9th (2014)	Kalikho Pul	People's Party of Arunachal
2		Chowna Mein	Lekang	17 July 2016	16 September 2016	10 years, 69 days	9th (2014)	Pema Khandu	Indian National Congress
2		Chowna Mein	Lekang	16 September 2016	31 December 2016	10 years, 69 days	9th (2014)	Pema Khandu	People's Party of Arunachal
2		Chowna Mein	Lekang	31 December 2016	29 May 2019	10 years, 69 days	9th (2014)	Pema Khandu	Bharatiya Janata Party
2		Chowna Mein	Chowkham	29 May 2019	12 June 2024	10 years, 69 days	10th (2019)	Pema Khandu	Bharatiya Janata Party
2		Chowna Mein	Chowkham	13 June 2024	Incumbent	10 years, 69 days	11th (2024)	Pema Khandu	Bharatiya Janata Party

== Statistics ==
List of deputy chief ministers by length of term

No.	Name	Party	Length of term	
No.	Name	Party	Longest continuous term	Total years of deputy chief ministership
1	Chowna Mein	INC/PPA/BJP	10 years, 217 days	10 years, 217 days
2	Kameng Dolo	INC/PPA	1 year, 119 days	1 year, 119 days

== Oath as the state deputy chief minister ==
The deputy chief minister serves five years in the office. The following is the oath of the Deputy chief minister of state:

I, <Name of Deputy Chief Minister>, do swear in the name of God/solemnly affirm that I will bear true faith and allegiance to the Constitution of India as by law established, that I will uphold the sovereignty and integrity of India, that I will faithfully and conscientiously discharge my duties as a Minister for the State of () and that I will do right to all manner of people in accordance with the Constitution and the law without fear or favour, affection or ill-will.

Oath of Secrecy

"I, [Name], do swear in the name of God / solemnly affirm that I will not directly or indirectly communicate or reveal to any person or persons any matter which shall be brought under my consideration or shall become known to me as a Minister for the State of [Name of State] except as may be required for the due discharge of my duties as such Minister== References ==

== Oath as the state deputy chief minister ==
The deputy chief minister serves five years in the office. The following is the oath of the Deputy chief minister of state:

I, <Name of Deputy Chief Minister>, do swear in the name of God/solemnly affirm that I will bear true faith and allegiance to the Constitution of India as by law established, that I will uphold the sovereignty and integrity of India, that I will faithfully and conscientiously discharge my duties as a Minister for the State of () and that I will do right to all manner of people in accordance with the Constitution and the law without fear or favour, affection or ill-will.

Oath of Secrecy

"I, [Name], do swear in the name of God / solemnly affirm that I will not directly or indirectly communicate or reveal to any person or persons any matter which shall be brought under my consideration or shall become known to me as a Minister for the State of [Name of State] except as may be required for the due discharge of my duties as such Minister.
