= Kaiwalya Trivikram Parnaik =

Indian politician and military officer (born 1953)

Lieutenant General Kaiwalya Trivikram Parnaik PVSM, UYSM, YSM
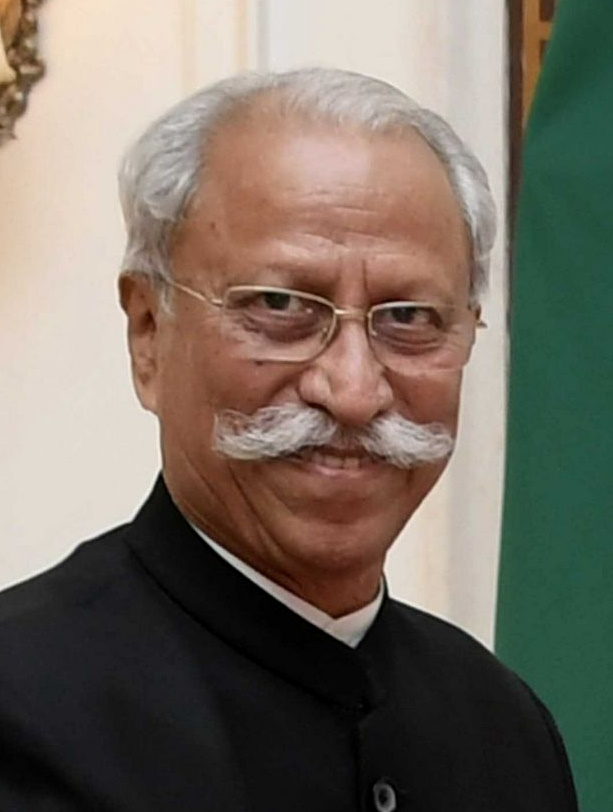
- Paranaik in 2023

Governor of Arunachal Pradesh
- Incumbent
- Assumed office 16 February 2023
- Chief Minister: Pema Khandu
- Preceded by: B. D. Mishra

19th General Officer Commanding-in-Chief, Northern Command
- In office 1 January 2011 – 30 June 2013
- President: Pratibha Patil; Pranab Mukherjee
- Preceded by: Lt Gen B. S. Jaswal
- Succeeded by: Lt Gen Sanjiv Chachra

Personal details
- Born: 28 June 1953 (age 73) Poona, Bombay State, India (present-day Pune, Maharashtra)
- Party: Independent
- Education: St. Aloysius Senior Secondary School; Sainik School, Rewa; National Defence Academy; Indian Military Academy
- Awards: Param Vishisht Seva Medal; Uttam Yudh Seva Medal; Yudh Seva Medal

Military service
- Allegiance: India
- Branch/service: Indian Army
- Years of service: 31 March 1972 – 30 June 2013
- Rank: Lieutenant General
- Unit: 2nd Rajputana Rifles
- Commands: Northern Command; IV Corps; Indian Military Training Team; 17 Mountain Division; 2 Rajputana Rifles
- Battles/wars: Operation Pawan; Operation Vijay; Operation Parakram

Lieutenant General K. T. Parnaik PVSM, UYSM, YSM (born 28 June 1953) is a retired general officer of the Indian Army who is serving as the 20th Governor of Arunachal Pradesh since 2023. He is the first person from Maharashtra who took over as the General Officer Commanding-in-Chief of Northern Command.

== Early life and military career ==
Parnaik studied at the St. Aloysius Senior Secondary School, along with his brother A. T. Parnaik, also a lieutenant general, who retired as Director General Border Roads. Later He joined Sainik School, Rewa and National Defence Academy. He was commissioned into the 2nd Rajputana Rifles on 31 March 1972 from the Indian Military Academy. He attended the Defence Services Staff College, Wellington. He commanded the 2nd battalion, The Rajputana Rifles (2 RajRif) in the Rajasthan Sector and in Jammu and Kashmir. He also attended the Senior Command and the Higher Command Course.

On 26 January 2003, Parnaik was awarded the Yudh Seva Medal for his command of an infantry brigade during the 2001–2002 India–Pakistan standoff. He attended the National Defence College in 2004 as part of the 44th course.

=== General officer ===
Promoted to the rank of Major General, Parnaik was appointed General officer commanding 17 Mountain Division in Sikkim. He later commanded the Indian Military Training Team (IMTRAT) in Bhutan. In 2009, Parnaik was promoted to the rank of Lieutenant General and appointed General officer commanding IV Corps in Tezpur. After a year-long tenure as GOC IV Corps, he moved to Army HQ as the Director General Perspective Planning - DG (PP). For his tenure as GOC IV Corps, on 26 January 2010, Parnaik was awarded the Uttam Yudh Seva Medal.

On 1 December 2010, Parnaik was accorded the status of Army Commander and named the Commander-designate of the Northern Command. He took over from Lieutenant General B. S. Jaswal on 1 January 2011. On 26 January 2012, he was awarded the Param Vishisht Seva Medal. After a two-and-a-half year stint as Northern Army Commander, he retired from the Army on 30 June 2013.

=== Governor ===
Parnaik was appointed Governor by Droupadi Murmu, President of India on 12 February 2023. He was congratulated by Pema Khandu, Chief Minister of Arunachal Pradesh, Chowna Mein, Deputy Chief Minister of Arunachal Pradesh and Yogi Adityanath, Chief Minister of Uttar Pradesh for becoming Governor.

Military offices
Preceded by B. S. Jaswal	General Officer Commanding IV Corps; 2009-2010	Succeeded by Gyan Bhushan
Preceded by B. S. Jaswal	General Officer Commanding-in-Chief Northern Command; 2011-2013	Succeeded by Sanjiv Chachra
Government offices
Preceded by B. D. Mishra	Governor of Arunachal Pradesh; 16 February 2023 - Present	Incumbent
