= Jyoti Prasad Rajkhowa =

Indian editor

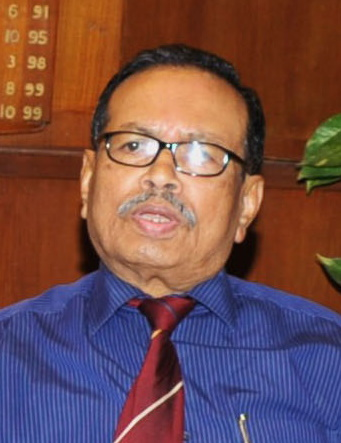

Governor of Arunachal Pradesh
- In office 1 June 2015 – 13 September 2016; On leave: 10 July – 12 August 2016
- Appointed by: Pranab Mukherjee
- Prime Minister: Narendra Modi
- Chief Ministers: Nabam Tuki; Kalikho Pul; Nabam Tuki; Pema Khandu
- Preceded by: Nirbhay Sharma
- Succeeded by: V. Shanmuganathan (additional charge)

Chief Secretary of Assam
- In office 1 August 2003 – 31 October 2004
- Chief Minister: Tarun Gogoi
- Preceded by: P. K. Datta
- Succeeded by: S. Kabilan

Personal details
- Born: 1 November 1944 (age 81)
- Education: Delhi School of Economics (MA); Cotton College (BA, Honours in Economics)

Jyoti Prasad Rajkhowa (born 1944) was the Governor of Arunachal Pradesh, a state in northeast India, served August 2016. A retired Indian Administrative Service officer of the 1968 batch, he ended his career as Chief Secretary of Assam.

== Education ==
He did M.A. in Economics from the Delhi School of Economics. Earlier Rajkhowa finished his schooling from Jorhat Government High School, Intermediate in Arts from J.B. College, Jorhat, and B.A. (Hons.) in Economics from Cotton College, Guwahati.

== Writings ==
He was appointed the Governor of Arunachal Pradesh on 12 May 2015.

While on deputation to the National Thermal Power Corporation Ltd (NTPC), New Delhi, a Government of India Public Sector Enterprise, he guided and supervised the publication of the "Do's & Don't's" and was also the Chairman of the Editorial Board of the journal titled "Sachetak". Mr Rajkhowa also authored a book, Central Vigilance Mechanism with special reference to P.S.E's, besides contributing a number of articles to leading newspapers.

The major work of Mr Rajkhowa, which earned him accolade from historians, scholars, intellectuals, military experts and the general readers, is Generalissimo Chilarai and his times, a historical biography on the legendary Koch king Chilarai.

Rajkhowa's other influential work was his second historical biography called Sankardeva: His life preachings & practices. The book's topic was Srimanta Sankardeva, a cultural and religious figure of Assamese history.

== Arunachal Pradesh President's Rule and his removal ==
J.P. Rajkhowa was removed from the office of Governor in 2016 after the Supreme Court overturned his decisions in the Arunachal Pradesh political crisis as it saw his use of gubernatorial discretion as a Constitutional red flag. He had advanced the Assembly session from January to 16 December 2015 without the advice of Council of Ministers and set the removal of Speaker Nabam Rebia as the first agenda item. These actions were taken when a group of Congress MLAs led by Kalikho Pul had withdrawn support from Chief Minister Nabam Tuki and faced disqualification by the Speaker. The Speaker Nabam Rebia ousted 14 rebels, only for the Deputy Speaker to overturn it. The rebel MLAs held a parallel sitting that ousted both the Speaker and the Chief Minister. Then Rajkhowa recommended the imposition of President's Rule in January 2016. His actions were initially upheld by the Gauhati High Court. But the Supreme Court, in its Nabam Rebia judgment (2016), declared these steps unconstitutional. It held that a Governor has no role in Tenth Schedule disqualification proceedings, described Rajkhowa's interventions as constitutional impropriety, and stated that a Governor is not an "all-pervading super constitutional authority," leading directly to his removal from office. He welcomed the Supreme Court's 11 May 2023 decision to refer the 2016 Nabam Rebia judgment (which had curtailed gubernatorial powers) to a larger seven-judge bench for reconsideration. The debate regarding the extent of gubernatorial powers in India is still continuing.

Political offices
Preceded by Nirbhay Sharma	Governor of Arunachal Pradesh; 12 May 2015 – 12 September 2016	Succeeded by V. Shanmuganathan
