= Government of Arunachal Pradesh =

Indian State Government

- Emblem of Arunachal Pradesh
- Polity type: Parliamentary republic State government
- Constitution: Constitution of India

Legislative branch
- Name: Arunachal Pradesh Legislative Assembly
- Type: Unicameral
- Meeting place: Itanagar
- Lower house
- Name: Arunachal Pradesh Legislative Assembly
- Presiding officer: Pasang Dorjee Sona, Speaker

Executive branch
- Head of state
- Currently: Kaiwalya Trivikram Parnaik
- Appointer: President of India (on advice of Central Government)
- Head of government
- Currently: Pema Khandu
- Appointer: Governor
- Cabinet
- Name: Council of Ministers of Arunachal Pradesh
- Leader: Pema Khandu
- Headquarters: Itanagar
- Ministries: See Council of Ministers

Judicial branch
- Name: Gauhati High Court
- Courts: Judiciary of India
- Gauhati High Court
- Chief judge: Ashutosh Kumar
- Seat: Itanagar Permanent Bench

The Government of Arunachal Pradesh or Arunachal Pradesh Government, abbreviated as GoAR, is the state government of the Indian state of Arunachal Pradesh. It consists of an executive, led by the Governor of Arunachal Pradesh, a judiciary and a legislative branch.

Like other states in India, the head of state of Arunachal Pradesh is the Governor, appointed by the President of India on the advice of the Central government. The office of the governor post is largely ceremonial. The Chief Minister is the head of government and is vested with most of the executive powers. Itanagar is the capital of Arunachal Pradesh, and houses the Arunachal Pradesh Legislative Assembly and the secretariat. The Gauhati High Court, Itanagar Permanent bench at Naharlagun exercises the jurisdiction and powers in respect of cases arising in the State of Arunachal Pradesh.

The present Legislative Assembly of Arunachal Pradesh is unicameral, consisting of 60 Members of the Legislative Assembly (M.L.A). Its term is 5 years, unless sooner dissolved.

== Investment and Development ==
In May 2025, Arunachal Pradesh signed Memorandums of Understanding (MoUs) worth ₹6,357 crore at the Rising Northeast Investors Summit held at Bharat Mandapam in New Delhi from May 23 to 24. This significant investment is expected to boost the state's economic development and infrastructure growth.

== Council of ministers ==
Portfolio	Minister	Took office	Left office	Party
Chief Minister	Pema Khandu	13 June 2024	Incumbent	BJP
Deputy Chief Ministers
Deputy Chief Minister; Finance, Planning and Investment, Tax & Excise, State Lotteries, Economics & Statistics, and Power and Non-Conventional Energy Resources	Chowna Mein	13 June 2024	Incumbent	BJP
Cabinet Ministers
Rural Development & Panchayati Raj, Cooperation and Transport	Ojing Tasing	13 June 2024	Incumbent	BJP
Law, Legislative and Justice, Social Justice, Empowerment & Tribal Affairs, and Sports & Youth Affairs	Kento Jini	13 June 2024	Incumbent	BJP
Urban Affairs, Land Management, and Civil Aviation	Balo Raja	13 June 2024	Incumbent	BJP
Home and Inter State Border Affairs, Public Health Engineering & Water Supply, Department of Indigenous Affairs	Mama Natung	13 June 2024	Incumbent	BJP
Women & Child Development, Cultural Affairs, and Science & Technology	Dasanglu Pul	13 June 2024	Incumbent	BJP
Education, Rural Works, Parliamentary Affairs, Tourism, and Libraries as a Cabinet Minister	Pasang Dorjee Sona	13 June 2024	Incumbent	BJP
Agriculture, Horticulture, Animal Husbandry & Veterinary, Dairy Development, Fisheries, Food & Civil Supplies, and Consumer Affairs	Gabriel Denwang Wangsu	13 June 2024	Incumbent	BJP
Environment & Forests, Geology, Mining & Minerals, and the Department of Tirap, Changlang, and Longding	Wangki Lowang	13 June 2024	Incumbent	BJP
Commerce & Industries, Labour & Employment, and Information & Public Relations & Printing.	Nyato Dukam	13 June 2024	Incumbent	BJP
Health & Family Welfare and Water Resources departments	Biyuram Wahge	13 June 2024	Incumbent	BJP

== See also ==
- Arunachal Pradesh Legislative Assembly
