= Nabam Tuki =

7th Chief Minister of Arunachal Pradesh

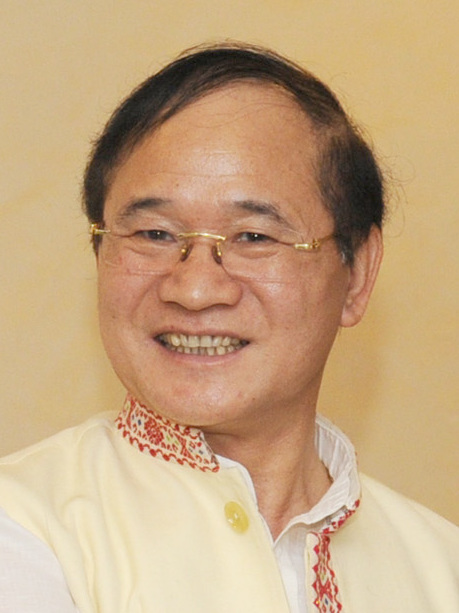
- Tuki in 2014

8th Chief Minister of Arunachal Pradesh
- In office 13 July 2016 – 16 July 2016
- Preceded by: Kalikho Pul
- Succeeded by: Pema Khandu
- In office 1 November 2011 – 26 January 2016
- Preceded by: Jarbom Gamlin
- Succeeded by: President's rule

President, Arunachal Pradesh Congress Committee
- In office 31 July 2019 – 18 June 2025
- Preceded by: Takam Sanjoy
- Succeeded by: Bosiram Siram

Chairman of North East Congress Coordination Committee
- Incumbent
- Assumed office 6 August 2022
- Preceded by: Office Established

Personal details
- Born: 7 July 1964 (age 62) Ompuli, North-East Frontier Agency, India (now in Arunachal Pradesh, India)
- Party: Indian National Congress
- Profession: politician

Nabam Tuki (born 7 July 1964) is an Indian politician and a former Chief Minister of Arunachal Pradesh. He held this position twice between 2011 and 2016. His first term was from November 2011 to January 2016, while the second term merely lasted 3 days in July 2016. He belongs to the Indian National Congress.

== Early life ==
Tuki was born in a Nyishi family on 7 July 1964 in Ompuli, Sagalee sub-division, Papum Pare district. He is married and has two sons and five daughters.

== Political career ==
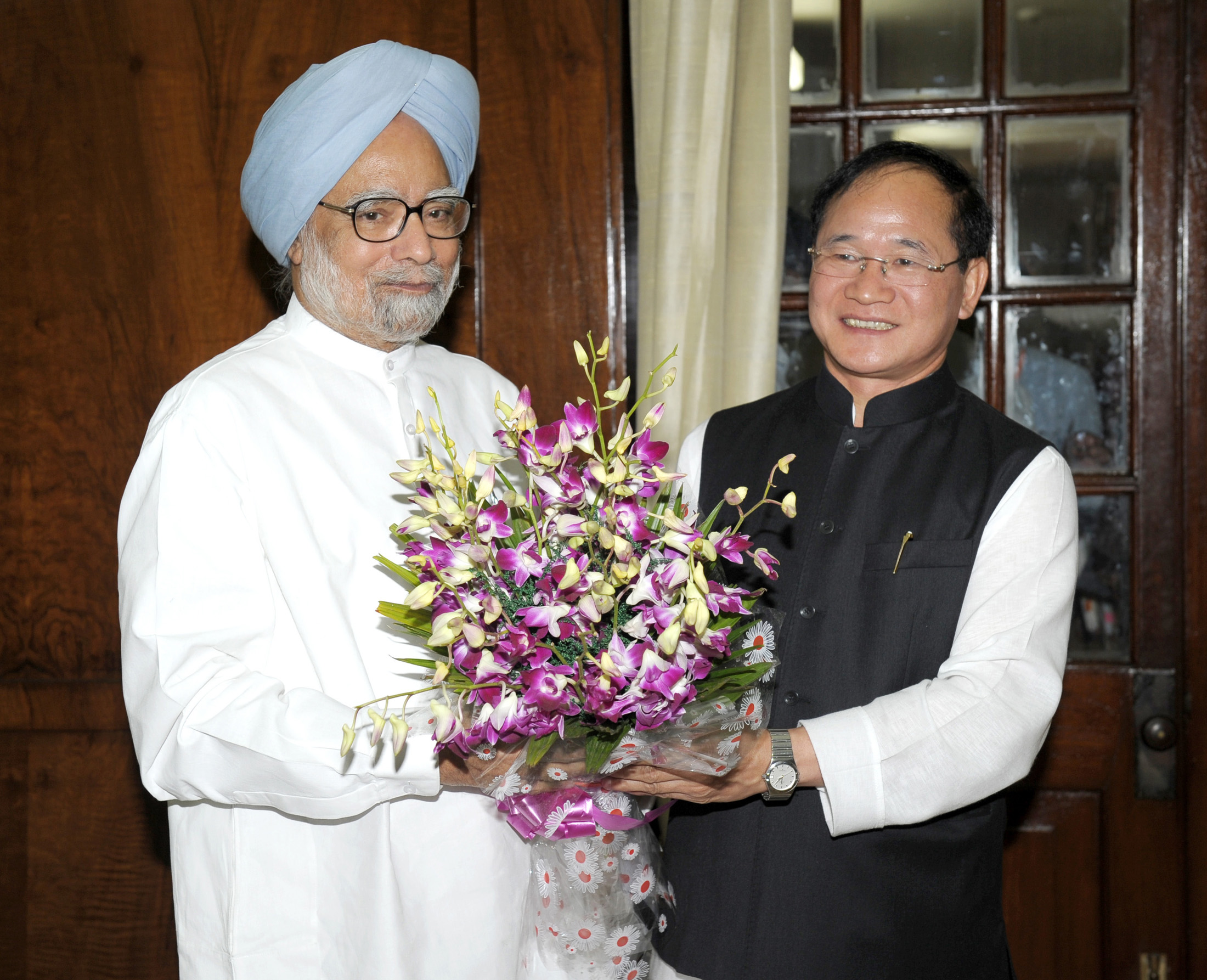
Tuki with Prime Minister Dr. Manmohan Singh

Tuki served as state president of the National Students' Union of India from 1983 to 1986 and was the Chairman of North East NSUI Coordination Committee from 1984 to 1986. He was the General Secretary of All India NSUI from 1986 to 1988 and Arunachal Pradesh Youth Congress President from 1988 to 1995. He was first elected to the second legislative assembly in 1995 from the Sagalee constituency and served as the deputy agriculture minister in the Gegong Apang ministry. He also served as transport and civil aviation minister in 1998. He was re-elected to the assembly in 1999 from the same constituency and became a cabinet minister with the environment and forest portfolio in the Mukut Mithi ministry. He was re-elected in the 2004 assembly election and 2009 assembly elections and served as the PWD and Urban Development minister under the Gegong Apang and Dorjee Khandu ministries.

He replaced Jarbom Gamlin as the Chief Minister of Arunachal Pradesh on 1 November 2011 and served until January 2016. After a political crisis in 2016, President's Rule was imposed, ending his tenure as chief minister. On 13 July 2016, the Supreme Court quashed Arunachal Pradesh Governor J.P. Rajkhowa's order to advance the Assembly session from 14 January 2016 to 16 December 2015, which resulted in President's rule in Arunachal Pradesh. As a result, Tuki took charge as the Chief Minister of Arunachal Pradesh on 13 July 2016. Hours before the Arunachal Pradesh Assembly floor test, he resigned as Chief Minister on 16 July 2016.

In June 2021, he was investigated by the Central Bureau of Investigation (CBI) for allegedly awarding contracts to his relatives without following proper procedures during his tenure as the Minister of Public Works Department and Urban Development in Arunachal Pradesh. In December 2021, a special court at Yupia accepted CBI's closure report of the investigation after the allegations of corruption against Tuki could not be proved.

In August 2022, the Indian National Congress appointed Tuki as the chairman of the North East Congress Coordination Committee.

He lost the Lok Sabha election from Arunachal West to the BJP candidate Kiren Rijju in 2024.

Political offices
Preceded by Jarbom Gamlin	Chief Minister of Arunachal Pradesh; 1 November 2011 – 26 January 2016	Succeeded by President's rule
Preceded by Kalikho Pul	Chief Minister of Arunachal Pradesh; 13 July 2016 – 16 July 2016	Succeeded by Pema Khandu
