= Dorjee Khandu =

5th Chief Minister of Arunachal Pradesh

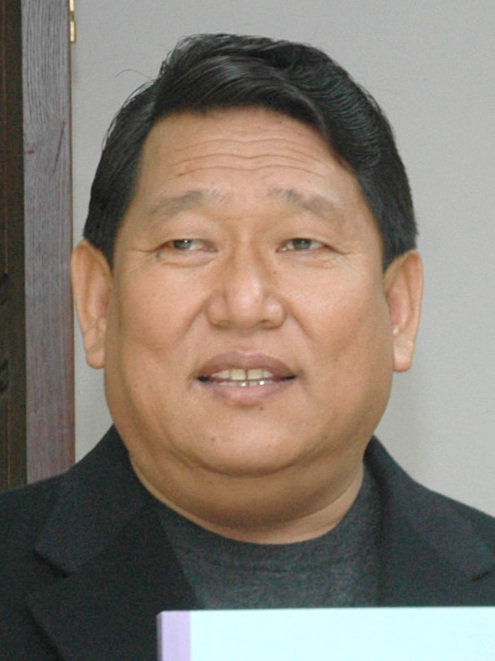
- Dorjee Khandu in 2009

6th Chief Minister of Arunachal Pradesh
- In office 9 April 2007 – 30 April 2011
- Preceded by: Gegong Apang
- Succeeded by: Jarbom Gamlin

Member of Arunachal Pradesh Legislative Assembly
- In office 19 March 1990 – 18 March 2011

Personal details
- Born: 19 March 1955 Gyangkhar Village, North East Frontier Agency, India
- Died: 30 April 2011 (aged 56) Lobotang, Arunachal Pradesh, India
- Party: Indian National Congress
- Children: Pema Khandu; Tsering Tashi
- Occupation: Politician

Dorjee Khandu (19 March 1955 – 30 April 2011) was an Indian politician who served as Chief Minister of Arunachal Pradesh from 2007 until his death in a helicopter crash in April 2011.

== Personal life ==
Dorjee Khandu was born to Leki Dorjee in Gyangkhar village in Tawang district, North East Frontier Agency, India.

Dorjee Khandu had four wives, five sons and two daughters. He was a follower of Buddhism and Donyi-Poloism. His eldest son, Pema Khandu, is currently the chief minister of Arunachal Pradesh.

== Career ==
Dorjee Khandu served in the Indian Army Intelligence Corps for seven years. He was awarded a gold medal for the service rendered during Bangladesh War. Later, he engaged in social activities for villagers of Tawang District. In 1980, he was elected unopposed as the First ASM and served till 1983.

- 1982: Chairman, Culture and Co-operative Societies.
- 1983–87: Elected unopposed as District Vice President, West Kameng District Zilla Parishad 1983–87.

=== Political career ===
In the March 1990 Arunachal Pradesh Legislative Assaembly elections, Khandu was elected unopposed to the Legislative Assembly of Arunachal Pradesh from Thingbu-Mukto constituency. He was re-elected to the Legislative Assembly from the same constituency in the March 1995 elections. He became the Minister of State for Cooperation on 21 March 1995.

- On 21 September 1996, he became the Minister for Animal Husbandry & Veterinary, Dairy Development.
- He was the Minister for Power from 1998 to 2006.
- In October 1999, he was re-elected to the Legislative Assembly. He was the Minister for Mines, Relief & Rehabilitation from 15 October 2002 to 27 July 2003.
- On 28 July 2003, he became the Minister for Relief & Rehabilitation and Disaster Management.
- In 2004, he was re-elected unopposed from Mukto constituency in the Arunachal Pradesh Legislative Assembly elections and became the minister for Power, NCER, and relief and rehabilitation.

=== Chief Minister of Arunachal Pradesh ===
On 9 April 2007, he became the sixth Chief Minister of the state, replacing Gegong Apang. Again in 2009, he was elected unopposed from the same constituency and was sworn in as the Chief Minister of the state on 25 October 2009.

== Disappearance and death ==
On 30 April 2011, a helicopter carrying Khandu and four other people on a trip from Tawang to Itanagar disappeared. On 2 May, the aerial search for Khandu was halted due to inclement weather, necessitating a move to ground search by the Indian Army, police, SSB and the Indo-Tibetan Border Police. Personnel were searching a heavily forested 66 square kilometer section of West Kameng district, where satellites detected possible plane remnants. Witnesses said they heard a large explosion on the morning of 30 April, around the same time as the helicopter went missing.

On 4 May 2011, at around 11 am, the remnants of the crashed helicopter were found by a group of locals. Although the crash was blamed on the poor condition of the helicopter, a single engine four seater Eurocopter B8 provided by Pawan Hans, the helicopter was only put into service in 2010.

P Chidambaram, Home Minister of India confirmed the news of Khandu's death on the morning of 5 May. Earlier in a briefing, Minister of External Affairs, SM Krishna said he was deeply pained by the chief minister's demise.

Khandu's last rites were performed in his native village, Gyangkhar, in Tawang district as per Monpa Buddhist rituals. His power minister Jarbom Gamlin succeeded him as the Chief Minister, only to resign on 31 October the same year.

Located in Famla village, the Dorjee Khnadu Memorial Museum was built in 2017 as a tribute to Dorjee Khandu by his family and well-wishers. The memorial has been blessed by the Dalai Lama.

== Recognition ==
In 2017, the plant species Impatiens dorjeekhandui was named after him.

| Preceded by Gegong Apang | Chief Minister of Arunachal Pradesh; April 2007–2011 | Succeeded by Jarbom Gamlin |
