= Jarbom Gamlin =

6th Chief Minister of Arunachal Pradesh

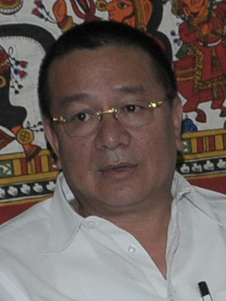

7th Chief Minister of Arunachal Pradesh
- In office 5 May 2011 – 31 October 2011
- Preceded by: Dorjee Khandu
- Succeeded by: Nabam Tuki

Personal details
- Born: 16 April 1961 Along, North-East Frontier Agency, India
- Died: 30 November 2014 (aged 53) Gurgaon, Haryana, India
- Party: Indian National Congress
- Spouse(s): Shakuntala Doley Gamlin and Dr. Moter Jini Gamlin
- Children: 2 daughters and 1 son, Son, Bomnee Gamlin
- Education: Campus Law Centre, Faculty of Law, University of Delhi
- Occupation: Politician
- Profession: Political Leader

Jarbom Gamlin (16 April 1961 – 30 November 2014) was an Indian politician and a leader of the Indian National Congress political party in Arunachal Pradesh and briefly served as the Chief Minister of Arunachal Pradesh.

== Early life ==
Gamlin was born in Along (now Aalo) in West Siang district to Sokjar Gamlin and Gamde Ete Gamlin. He studied in Sainik School, Goalpara in Assam and during 1976-77 he was the school captain. In 1982, he graduated in History from St. Stephen's College in Delhi and graduated in law from Campus Law Centre of the Faculty of Law, University of Delhi in 1984. Later, he practiced as a lawyer in Dibrugarh. He was the President of All Arunachal Pradesh Students Union (AAPSU). He was the president of Arunachal Pradesh Bar Association from 1992-2001.

== Personal life ==
He is survived by his wife, two daughters and a son. His son, Bomnee Gamlin completed his 12th grade from Sanskriti School in New Delhi, and is presently pursuing B.Des from Delhi University

== Political career ==
Gamlin started off as a student leader of the All Arunachal Pradesh Students Union (AAPSU). He was the president of the AAPSU from 1981-83. He was the member of the 13th Lok Sabha representing Arunachal West Lok Sabha constituency. In 2004, he was elected to the 4th Arunachal Pradesh Legislative Assembly from Liromoba constituency in West Siang district and became the Home Minister in the Gegong Apang led government. later he was dropped from the cabinet due to his differences with Apang. He was instrumental in toppling the Apang ministry and installation of Dorjee Khandu as the chief minister in April 2007. In 2009 he was re-elected to the 5th Arunachal Pradesh Legislative Assembly from the same constituency and became the Power Minister in the Dorjee Khandu led state cabinet on 6 November 2009.

== Chief minister of Arunachal Pradesh ==
On 5 May 2011, Gamlin became the Chief Minister of Arunachal Pradesh after the death of Dorjee Khandu on 30 April 2011. On 31 October 2011, Gamlin government was toppled by Nabam Tuki.

== Death ==
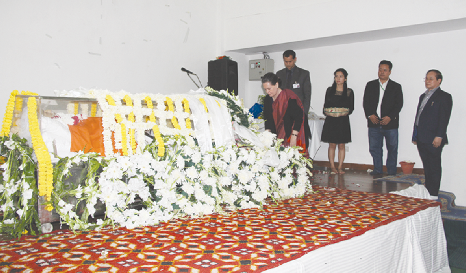
Sonia, Rahul pay homage to Late Gamlin

According to family sources, he had liver thrombosis which affected other vital organs. He was being treated at Medanta Hospital in Gurgaon but succumbed to his illness at 11:15 pm on 30 November 2014, aged 53.

From Guwahati Airport, his body was flown to Naharlagun helipad at 12.00 noon where it was kept for an hour for the people to pay their last respects before being flown to Aalo where he was laid to rest. Thousands including President Pranab Mukherjee, and Prime Minister Narendra Modi paid their respects.
