= Mukto Assembly constituency =

Legislative Assembly constituency in Arunachal Pradesh state, India

Coordinates: 27.66°N 92.10°E

Mukto
- Constituency No. 3 for the Arunachal Pradesh Legislative Assembly

Constituency details
- Country: India
- Region: Northeast India
- State: Arunachal Pradesh
- District: Tawang
- Lok Sabha constituency: Arunachal West
- Established: 1990
- Total electors: 7,995
- Reservation: ST

Member of Legislative Assembly
- 11th Arunachal Pradesh Legislative Assembly
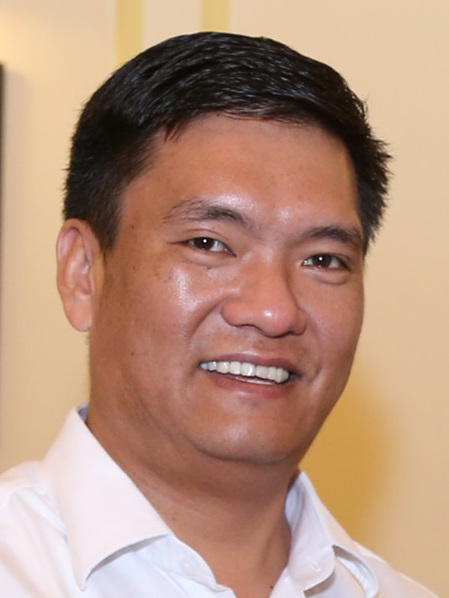
- Incumbent Pema Khandu; Chief Minister of Arunachal Pradesh
- Party: BJP
- Alliance: NDA
- Elected year: 2024

Mukto Assembly constituency is one of the 60 Legislative Assembly constituencies of Arunachal Pradesh state in India. It is reserved for candidates belonging to the ST and is part of Arunachal West Lok Sabha constituency along with 32 other Legislative Assembly segments.

Mukto is one of the 3 constituencies located in Tawang district. It covers the entire Thingbu and Mukto circles and parts of Tawang and Lumla circles.Chief minister of state represents this constituency.

== Members of the Legislative Assembly ==
Year	Member	Party
1990	Dorjee Khandu	Indian National Congress
1995	Dorjee Khandu	Indian National Congress
1999	Dorjee Khandu	Indian National Congress
2004	Dorjee Khandu	Indian National Congress
2009	Dorjee Khandu	Indian National Congress
2011 (Note: by-election)	Pema Khandu	Indian National Congress
2014	Pema Khandu	Indian National Congress
2019	Pema Khandu	Bharatiya Janata Party
2024	Pema Khandu	Bharatiya Janata Party

== Election results ==
=== Assembly Election 2024 ===
2024 Arunachal Pradesh Legislative Assembly election: Mukto
Party	Candidate	Votes	%	±%
BJP	Pema Khandu	Unopposed		
Registered electors		7,995		▲8.89
BJP hold		Swing		

=== Assembly Election 2019 ===
2019 Arunachal Pradesh Legislative Assembly election: Mukto
Party	Candidate	Votes	%	±%
BJP	Pema Khandu	4,304	70.74	New
INC	Thupten Kunphen	1,685	27.70	New
NOTA	None of the Above	95	1.56	New
Margin of victory		2,619	43.05	
Turnout		6,084	82.87	▲82.87
Registered electors		7,342		▲2.24
BJP gain from INC		Swing		

=== Assembly By-election 2011 ===
2011 Arunachal Pradesh Legislative Assembly by-election: Mukto
Party	Candidate	Votes	%	±%
INC	Pema Khandu	Unopposed		
Registered electors		6,783		▼1.92
INC hold		Swing		

=== Assembly Election 2014 ===
2014 Arunachal Pradesh Legislative Assembly election: Mukto
Party	Candidate	Votes	%	±%
INC	Pema Khandu	Unopposed		
Registered electors		7,181		▲3.83
INC hold		Swing		

=== Assembly Election 2009 ===
2009 Arunachal Pradesh Legislative Assembly election: Mukto
Party	Candidate	Votes	%	±%
INC	Dorjee Khandu	Unopposed		
Registered electors		6,916		▲16.92
INC hold		Swing		

=== Assembly Election 2004 ===
2004 Arunachal Pradesh Legislative Assembly election: Mukto
Party	Candidate	Votes	%	±%
INC	Dorjee Khandu	Unopposed		
Registered electors		5,915		▲6.40
INC hold		Swing		

=== Assembly Election 1999 ===
1999 Arunachal Pradesh Legislative Assembly election: Mukto
Party	Candidate	Votes	%	±%
INC	Dorjee Khandu	2,777	56.88	▼17.52
NCP	Theg Tse Rinpoche	2,105	43.12	New
Margin of victory		672	13.76	▼35.04
Turnout		4,882	88.90	▼1.31
Registered electors		5,559		▲4.37
INC hold		Swing		

=== Assembly Election 1995 ===
1995 Arunachal Pradesh Legislative Assembly election: Mukto
Party	Candidate	Votes	%	±%
INC	Dorjee Khandu	3,532	74.40	New
JD	Rinchen Dorjee	1,215	25.60	New
Margin of victory		2,317	48.81	
Turnout		4,747	90.37	▲89.13
Registered electors		5,326		▲7.27
INC hold		Swing		

=== Assembly Election 1990 ===
1990 Arunachal Pradesh Legislative Assembly election: Mukto
Party	Candidate	Votes	%	±%
INC	Dorjee Khandu	Unopposed		
Registered electors		4,965		
INC win (new seat)				

== See also ==
- List of constituencies of Arunachal Pradesh Legislative Assembly
- Tawang district
- Arunachal Pradesh Legislative Assembly
