= Chowna Mein =

Indian politician (born 1950)

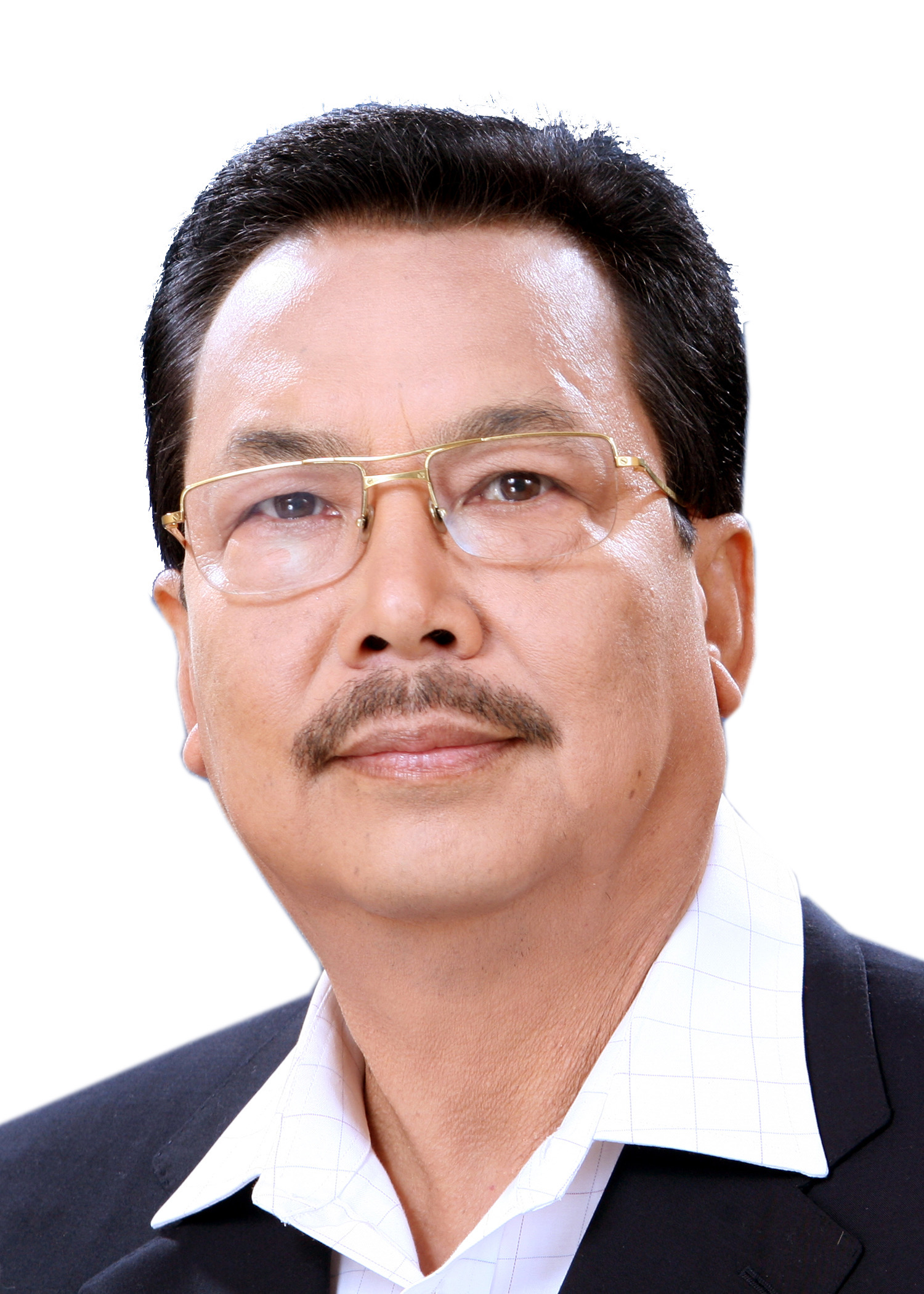
- Official portrait, 2016

Deputy Chief Minister of Arunachal Pradesh
- Incumbent
- Assumed office 19 February 2016
- Governor: Jyoti Prasad Rajkhowa; Tathagata Roy; V. Shanmuganathan; Padmanabha Acharya; B. D. Mishra; Kaiwalya Trivikram Parnaik
- Chief Minister: Pema Khandu
- Preceded by: Position established

Member of Arunachal Pradesh Legislative Assembly
- Incumbent
- Assumed office 2019
- Constituency: Chowkham
- In office 1995–2019
- Constituency: Lekang

Personal details
- Born: 2 December 1950 (age 75) Sunpura, North-East Frontier Agency, India
- Party: Bharatiya Janata Party
- Other political affiliations: Indian National Congress (till September 2016); Peoples Party of Arunachal (September 2016 - December 2016)
- Education: Jawaharlal Nehru College, Pasighat

Chowna Mein (born 2 December 1950) is an Indian politician from Arunachal Pradesh, who has been serving as the state's Deputy Chief Minister since July 2016 under the present Government formed by Bharatiya Janata Party (BJP), with Pema Khandu as its Chief Minister. Mein holds the portfolio of Finance & Investment, Power & Non Conventional Energy Resources, Tax & Excise, State Lotteries, and Economics & Statistics.

Prior to his role as Deputy Chief Minister under the present BJP Government, Mein also held the post of Deputy Chief Minister in the state of Arunachal Pradesh from March 2016 to July 2016 under the Government formed by former Chief Minister Kalikho Pul. After the brief Government formed by Pul, Pema Khandu was sworn in as the 9th Chief Minister of Arunachal Pradesh in July 2016, during which Chowna Mein was also sworn in as Deputy Chief Minister of the state.

On 21 December 2016, Pema Khandu, along with Chowna Mein and 5 other MLAs were suspended from the People's Party of Arunachal by the party president, and Takam Pario was named as the next likely Chief Minister of Arunachal Pradesh replacing Khandu. However, in a fast-paced development, a BJP Government was established in the state, after 33 out of 43 PPA MLAs joined the party. The newly formed Government by BJP in Arunachal Pradesh continued with the previous cabinet established under Chief Minister Pema Khandu, implying that Chowna Mein continued to serve as the Deputy Chief Minister under the new Government.

== Early life ==
Chowna Mein was born on 2 December 1950 at Sunpura, Lohit district, Arunachal Pradesh to a Tai Khamti family. His father is the late Chow Pook Gohain, one of the founding fathers of Arunachal Pradesh; who was elected to the first agency council in 1969, then served as a member of the Agency Council till 1972. At the time, Arunachal Pradesh was renamed from the North-East Frontier Agency and made a Union Territory.

Mein is an alumnus of the Don Bosco School, Guwahati and Jawaharlal Nehru College, Pasighat. His family has long been associated with the political field, and hence his entry into politics can be seen as a natural inclination towards carrying forward his family legacy. Apart from his father, Mein’s elder brother, Chow Tewa Mein has remained an elected member of the Pradesh Council in 1972; and his maternal uncles, Chow Khamoon Gohain and Chow Chandret Gohain have both remained elected members of the Legislative Assembly.

== Political career ==
Chowna Mein started his political career in 1995, when he was elected as a Member of the Legislative Assembly from the 48th Lekang (ST) Assembly Constituency of the Namsai district (then Lohit) of Arunachal Pradesh. He was elected consecutively for 6 terms by the people of 48-Lekang during 1995, 1999, 2004, 2009, 2014 Assembly elections.

In 2019, he changed his constituency and was elected as the Member of the Legislative Assembly for the 46th Chowkham-Wakro constituency during the 2019 assembly elections. On 29 May 2019, Chowna Mein was sworn in as the Deputy Chief Minister after Pema Khandu was sworn in as the Chief Minister of Arunachal Pradesh.

=== Roles undertaken in his political career ===
| Elected as | Constituency | Year | Designation |
|---|---|---|---|
| MLA | 48-Lekang (JD) | 1995 | Became speaker in 1998 |
| MLA | 48-Lekang (INC) | 1999 | Minister - PHE & WS in 1999 Minister - Env & Forests in 2022 |
| MLA | 48-Lekang (INC) | 2004 | Minister - Education, Coop etc in 2004 Minister RD & RWD in 2007 |
| MLA | 48-Lekang (INC) | 2009 | Minister PHE & WS and AHV in 2009 Minister-Finance, Planning & PWD in 2011 |
| MLA | 48-Lekang (INC) | 2014 | Minister-Agri, Horti & AHV |
| MLA | 48-Lekang (INC) | 2016 | Deputy Chief Minister from March 2016 to July 2016 (under Pul led Govt.) Deputy Chief Minister from July 2016 to present (under Khandu led Govt) |
| MLA | 46-Chowkham (BJP) | 2019 | Deputy Chief Minister – Finance & Investment, Power & Non Conventional Energy Resources, Tax & Excise, State Lotteries, and Economics & Statistics |
| MLA | 46-Chowkham (BJP) | 2024 | Deputy Chief Minister – Finance & Investment, Power & Non-Conventional Energy Resources, Tax & Excise, State Lotteries, and Economics & Statistics. |

== Achievements ==
Chowna Mein received the Lachit Barphukan Award 2022 from Tai-Ahom in honour of his selfless achievements in furthering the welfare of society and preserving Tai culture.

== Honours ==
Gauhati University conferred upon Chowna Mein an honorary Ph.D. (Honoris Causa) at its 32nd convocation on 25 April 2025. Recognized for his leadership, his promotion of the Tai‑Khamti culture, and contributions to religious harmony and social development.

Chowna Buku Chulu (Aryarakta) is a species of Begonia named in honour of Chowna Mein. The species name, meaning "Noble Red," was designated to acknowledge his contributions to promoting research, innovation, and sustainable development in the agriculture and horticulture sectors of Arunachal Pradesh.

Mein was conferred the Bhupen Hazarika Samannay Award 2026 in recognition of his contributions towards strengthening cultural and emotional ties between Assam and Arunachal Pradesh.

The award was presented during Mahamilanor Tirtha, a commemorative programme organised by the Bhupen Hazarika Cultural Trust in association with the Srimanta Sankaradeva Kalakshetra Society in Guwahati. The programme marked the 15th death anniversary of Bharat Ratna Dr. Bhupen Hazarika.

The award was presented by Assam Minister Atul Bora at the event held on 5 November 2026.

== See also ==
- Arunachal Pradesh Legislative Assembly
