= Kalikho Pul =

Indian politician

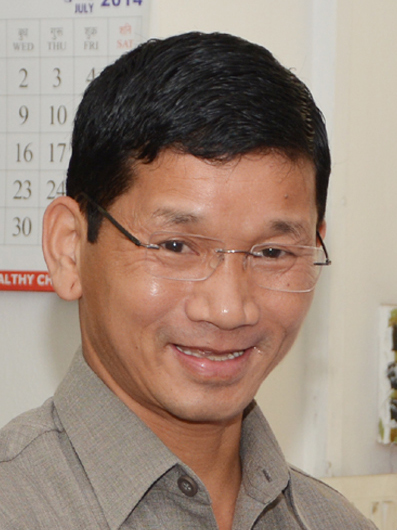

8th Chief Minister of Arunachal Pradesh
- In office 19 February 2016 – 13 July 2016
- Preceded by: President's rule
- Succeeded by: Nabam Tuki

Member of Legislative Assembly
- In office 1995 – 9 August 2016
- Preceded by: Khapriso Krong
- Succeeded by: Dasanglu Pul
- Constituency: Hayuliang

Personal details
- Born: 20 July 1969 Walla, Hawai, Anjaw, North-East Frontier Agency, India
- Died: 9 August 2016 (aged 47) Itanagar, Arunachal Pradesh, India
- Party: Indian National Congress (until 2016); People's Party of Arunachal (2016)
- Spouse(s): Dangwimsai Pul,Dasanglu Pul
- Children: 6 (2 Deceased)
- Occupation: Politician

Kalikho Pul (20 July 1969 – 9 August 2016) was an Indian politician and former Chief Minister of the north-eastern state of Arunachal Pradesh for a brief time in 2016. He was elected five times from the Hayuliang Vidhan Sabha constituency representing the Indian National Congress. With the support of a few elected members of Congress and the opposing Bharatiya Janata Party, he took Chief Ministership of Arunachal Pradesh. However, the Supreme Court of India ruled against this appointment on various grounds. On 9 August 2016, Pul allegedly committed suicide by hanging at his official residence in Itanagar; Pul's supporters protested in Itanagar demanding an investigation by the Central Bureau of Investigation (CBI).

== Early life ==
Pul was born on 20 July 1969 in the Walla village of Hawai, Anjaw district and belonged to the Kaman Mishmi ethnic group.

Pul was 13 months old when his mother Koranlu died. His father Tailum died when he was around six years old after which he lived with his aunt's family and helped support the family by collecting firewood. He left school and when he was 10 years old joined a carpentry course at the Hawai Craft Centre where he earned ₹1.50 (1.6¢ US) per day as stipend. He also worked as a tutor there on temporary basis. He joined a night school on the advice of Mr. Ram Naresh Prasad Sinha, the Headmaster of Hawai Middle School in the mid eighties. Impressed by Mr. Pul's progress, Mr Sinha took steps regarding his direct admission in the 6th standard. In that context, he prepared him for a welcome speech at a function held at the school where the education minister Khapriso Krong and Lohit Deputy Commissioner D S Negi were to be present. As Kalikho was able to impress the audience with his speech and a patriotic song, Mr. Sinha admitted Pul in Hawai Middle School besides offering him a place in the school hostel. As there was no official scholarship for poor students, the headmaster, with support from the Circle Officer of Hawai; was able to manage the job of watchman for Kalikho at the Circle Office, Hawai which paid him ₹212 (US$2.30) monthly. In his final year of school, he was nominated as the student representative with the title of General Secretary. Pul later earned a living by opening a paan shop, making bamboo fences and thatched houses, and building concrete structures. Later, he graduated in economics (part of Humanities stream) from Indira Gandhi College, Tezu and also studied law.

In an interview Pul mentioned that he did not believe in God, stating; "I don’t believe in God because had He been there, I wouldn't have suffered."

In the 1980s, Pul suffered from a chronic gastric problem for six years and was not able to get financial help for the treatment. He considered committing suicide by jumping over the bridge in River Lohit but said that he could not "take the extreme step due to the presence of people". He received financial help from Deputy Commissioner Negi and then completed his treatment. He had special interest in social service, community service and attending to poor and destitute persons.

== Political career ==
Pul contested the Hayuliang Vidhan Sabha constituency and won elections in 1995, 1999, 2004, 2009 and 2014 contesting as an Indian National Congress candidate. He contested and won his first election in the year 1995 when he was elected as MLA from Hayuliang constituency and was made the Minister of State for Finance in the Mukut Mithi government. Pul handled various portfolios of Finance, Tax & Excise, and Health & Family Welfare. His roles in State Government were deputy minister for finance (1995–97), minister of state for power (1997–99), MoS for finance (1999-2002), MoS for land management (2002–03). He was State Finance Minister under Chief Minister Gegong Apang from 2003 until 2007. He was again Finance Minister until November 2011. He was also made chairman of a high-powered committee and simultaneously adviser to the CM for about a year.

Between 2011 and 2014, he was made adviser to the Chief Minister. After the 2014 elections, he took charge of the Health & Family Welfare ministry while Nabam Tuki was the Chief Minister. He expressed concerns about opium addiction among youth and announced de-addiction centres in affected districts. He also launched a community horti-farming project in Anjaw district, aimed at providing technical support and marketing assistance to farmers of products such as cardamom, kiwis, plums, apples and oranges. During his tenure as Health & Family Welfare Minister he also complained that his "attempts to improve the state's health indicators were often met with roadblocks when it came to acquiring funds to meet staff and medicinal shortages". This led to differences with other cabinet ministers and he was removed from the cabinet in December 2014. In April 2015 he was expelled from the party for six years for alleged anti-party activities. Pul called Arunachal Pradesh Congress Committee's move foul as he was not even served a show cause notice and said that he was "punished for doing his job". In a press conference held the next day, he blamed the state government for various financial irregularities that included unmanaged funds amounting to nearly ₹6,924 crore (US$740 million) received from the central government, ₹864 crore (US$92 million) of the General Provident Fund and ₹97 crore (US$10 million) of the New Pension System.

Kalikho Pul was also the executive member of Arunachal Pradesh Congress Committee for 13 years and Pradesh Election Committee member for 7 years.

Chief Minister

In late 2015, Pul broke away from the Congress party. He became the acting Chief Minister of Arunachal Pradesh on 19 February 2016, along with other rebel politicians of Congress. His government was supported by the opposing Bharatiya Janata Party. On 3 March 2016 he, along with 30 dissident Congress MLAs, joined the People's Party of Arunachal. While Pul was Chief Minister, his official residence was open to poor villagers to get medical help.

The Supreme Court of India dismissed Pul's government in July 2016. The court ruled out Governor Jyoti Prasad Rajkhowa's decision on the formation of Pul's government. The Congress party accused Rajkhowa of tacitly helping the rebels by calling the assembly session in December, a month ahead of schedule. The government was also formed without a floor test or asking the Chief Minister to prove his majority in the house. Nabam Tuki took over after Pul but he was not accepted by a majority of the Congress MLAs. Pul and the dissident MLAs came back to the Congress fold and supported Pema Khandu as the Chief Minister.

== Death ==
Pul died on 9 August 2016 at the age of 47. His body was discovered that morning hanging from the ceiling fan in the room where he practiced yoga. Police took the body into custody and sent it for autopsy. He allegedly committed suicide by hanging in the Chief Minister's bungalow at Itanagar which he still occupied while his home was under renovation. He is survived by three wives and four children.

Reports of finding a diary written by Pul were dismissed by additional district magistrate (ADM) Talo Potom on 11 August. However, four 60-page booklets called Mere Vichar ("My Thoughts") were found in his room and taken into custody by police. Other evidence was sealed by the police to be opened in front of the appointed magistrate. According to Indo-Asian News Service, a senior police official confirmed that a suicide note was found but did not divulge its contents. However, Asian News International reported the Home Ministry's confirmation that there was no suicide note.

Pul's supporters assembled outside his residence and protested, demanding an investigation by the Central Bureau of Investigation (CBI) into Pul's death. They also vandalized the nearby residences of ministers. The supporters burned the plywood coffin brought for Pul stating that it was "not worthy of a popular CM like Pul." The State government ordered a magisterial inquiry to investigate the death. Pul's wife, Dangwimsai Pul appealed to Supreme Court in February 2017 demanding an FIR to be registered and a CBI investigation be done in the case. The suicide note contains the names of two Supreme Court judges who were part of the bench that dismissed Pul's government. The suicide letter that was made public by Campaign for Judicial Accountability and Judicial Reforms, alleges that Pul was approached by the son of Justice J.S. Khehar for a bribe of 49 crores to get the decision in his favour. The widow of Pul approached the Vice President of India for an independent probe by a Special Investigation Team as the charges are against Supreme Court judges, including the former Chief Justice of India, Justice J.S Khehar.
