= Chief Minister of Arunachal Pradesh =

Leader of the executive branch of Government of Arunachal Pradesh

- Emblem of Arunachal Pradesh

- Flag of India

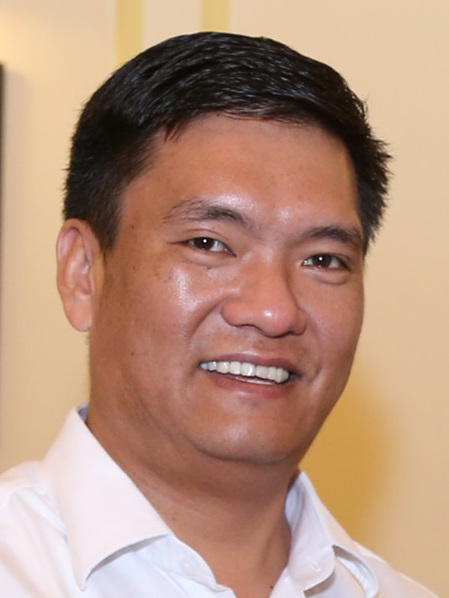
- Incumbent; Pema Khandu since 17 July 2016
- Chief Minister's Office; Government of Arunachal Pradesh
- Type: Leader of the Executive
- Status: Head of government
- Abbreviation: CMoAR
- Member of: Legislative Assembly; State Cabinet
- Reports to: Governor of Arunachal Pradesh; Arunachal Pradesh Legislative Assembly
- Nominator: MLAs of the majority party or alliance
- Appointer: Governor of Arunachal Pradesh; by convention based on appointees ability to command confidence in the Legislative Assembly
- Term length: At the confidence of the assembly; Chief minister's term is for five years and is subject to no term limits.
- Inaugural holder: Prem Khandu Thungan
- Formation: 13 August 1975 (51 years ago)
- Deputy: Deputy Chief Minister of Arunachal Pradesh
- Salary: ₹133,000 (US$1,400
- Website: www.arunachalpradeshcm.in

The chief minister of Arunachal Pradesh is chief executive of the Indian state of Arunachal Pradesh. As per the Constitution of India, the governor of Arunachal Pradesh is the state's de jure head, but de facto executive authority rests with the chief minister. Following elections to the Arunachal Pradesh Legislative Assembly, the governor usually invites the party (or coalition) with a majority of seats to form the government. The governor appoints the chief minister, whose council of ministers are collectively responsible to the assembly. Given that he has the confidence of the assembly, the chief minister's term is for five years and is subject to no term limits. Pema Khandu of the Bharatiya Janata Party is the current incumbent. Chief Minister also serves as Leader of the House in the Legislative Assembly.

== Oath as the state chief minister ==
The chief minister serves five years in the office. The following is the oath of the chief minister of state:

I, <Name of Chief Minister>, do swear in the name of God/solemnly affirm that I will bear true faith and allegiance to the Constitution of India as by law established, that I will uphold the sovereignty and integrity of India, that I will faithfully and conscientiously discharge my duties as a Minister for the State of () and that I will do right to all manner of people in accordance with the Constitution and the law without fear or favour, affection or ill-will.

Oath of Secrecy

"I, [Name], do swear in the name of God / solemnly affirm that I will not directly or indirectly communicate or reveal to any person or persons any matter which shall be brought under my consideration or shall become known to me as a Minister for the State of [Name of State] except as may be required for the due discharge of my duties as such Minister."

== Chief Minister of Arunachal Pradesh (1975– present) ==
- ^{†} Died in office
- ^{§} Returned to office after a previous non-consecutive term

#	Portrait	Chief Minister (Birth-Death) Constituency	Election	Term of office			Political party	Ministry
#	Portrait	Chief Minister (Birth-Death) Constituency	Election	From	To	Period	Political party	Ministry
Union territory of Arunachal Pradesh (1972–1987) (Note: The Union Territory of Arunachal Pradesh existed from 21 January 1972 until 20 February 1987. It was created under the North-Eastern Areas (Reorganisation) Act, 1971, replacing the North-East Frontier Agency (NEFA), which had previously been administered by the Government of India through the Governor of Assam. The creation of the Union Territory marked the beginning of representative government in the region, eventually leading to full statehood in 1987.)
1		Prem Khandu Thungan (born 1946); MLA for Dirang Kalaktang	–	13 August 1975	14 March 1978	4 years, 36 days	Independent	Thungon I
1		Prem Khandu Thungan (born 1946); MLA for Dirang Kalaktang	1978 (1st)	14 March 1978	18 September 1979	4 years, 36 days	Janata Party	Thungon II
2		Tomo Riba (1934–2000); MLA for Basar	1978 (1st)	18 September 1979	3 November 1979	46 days	People's Party of Arunachal	Riba
Position vacant (3 November 1979 – 18 January 1980); President's rule was imposed during this period (Note: When President's rule is in force in a state, its council of ministers stands dissolved. The office of chief minister thus lies vacant. At times, the legislative assembly also stands dissolved.)
3		Gegong Apang (born 1947); MLA for Tuting–Yingkiong	1980 (2nd)	18 January 1980	2 January 1985	7 years, 32 days	Indian National Congress	Apang I
3		Gegong Apang (born 1947); MLA for Tuting–Yingkiong	1984 (3rd)	2 January 1985	19 February 1987	7 years, 32 days	Indian National Congress	Apang II
State of Arunachal Pradesh (1987–present)
1		Gegong Apang (born 1947); MLA for Tuting–Yingkiong	1984 (3rd)	20 February 1987	19 March 1990	11 years, 334 days	Indian National Congress	Apang II
1		Gegong Apang (born 1947); MLA for Tuting–Yingkiong	1990 (4th)	19 March 1990	21 March 1995	11 years, 334 days	Indian National Congress	Apang III
1		Gegong Apang (born 1947); MLA for Tuting–Yingkiong	1995 (5th)	21 March 1995	19 January 1999	11 years, 334 days	Arunachal Congress	Apang IV
2		Mukut Mithi (born 1952); MLA for Roing	1999 (6th)	19 January 1999	3 August 2003	4 years, 196 days	Indian National Congress	Mithi
(1)		Gegong Apang (born 1947); MLA for Tuting–Yingkiong	1999 (6th)	3 August 2003	30 August 2003	3 years, 249 days	United Democratic Front	Apang V
(1)		Gegong Apang (born 1947); MLA for Tuting–Yingkiong	1999 (6th)	30 August 2003	16 October 2004	3 years, 249 days	Bharatiya Janata Party	Apang V
(1)		Gegong Apang (born 1947); MLA for Tuting–Yingkiong	2004 (7th)	16 October 2004	9 April 2007	3 years, 249 days	Indian National Congress	Apang VI
3		Dorjee Khandu (1955–2011); MLA for Mukto	2004 (7th)	9 April 2007	25 October 2009	4 years, 21 days	Indian National Congress	Dorjee I
3		Dorjee Khandu (1955–2011); MLA for Mukto	2009 (8th)	25 October 2009	30 April 2011	4 years, 21 days	Indian National Congress	Dorjee II
4		Jarbom Gamlin (1961–2014); MLA for Liromoba	2009 (8th)	5 May 2011	1 November 2011	180 days	Indian National Congress	Gamlin
5		Nabam Tuki (born 1964); MLA for Sagalee	2009 (8th)	1 November 2011	18 May 2014	4 years, 86 days	Indian National Congress	Tuki I
5		Nabam Tuki (born 1964); MLA for Sagalee	2014 (9th)	18 May 2014	26 January 2016	4 years, 86 days	Indian National Congress	Tuki II
Position vacant (26 January 2016 – 19 February 2016= 28 days); President's rule was imposed during this period
6		Kalikho Pul (1969–2016); MLA for Hayuliang	– (9th)	19 February 2016	13 July 2016	145 days	People's Party of Arunachal	Pul
(5)		Nabam Tuki (born 1964); MLA for Sagalee	– (9th)	13 July 2016	17 July 2016	4 days	Indian National Congress	–
7		Pema Khandu (born 1979); MLA for Mukto	– (9th)	17 July 2016	16 September 2016	10 years, 86 days	Indian National Congress	Pema I
7		Pema Khandu (born 1979); MLA for Mukto	– (9th)	16 September 2016	31 December 2016	10 years, 86 days	People's Party of Arunachal	Pema II
7		Pema Khandu (born 1979); MLA for Mukto	– (9th)	31 December 2016	29 May 2019	10 years, 86 days	Bharatiya Janata Party	Pema III
7		Pema Khandu (born 1979); MLA for Mukto	2019 (10th)	29 May 2019	13 June 2024	10 years, 86 days	Bharatiya Janata Party	Pema IV
7		Pema Khandu (born 1979); MLA for Mukto	2024 (11th)	13 June 2024	Incumbent	10 years, 86 days	Bharatiya Janata Party	Pema V

== Statistics ==
=== List by chief minister ===
#	Chief Minister	Party	Term of office	
#	Chief Minister	Party	Longest continuous term	Total duration of chief ministership
1	Gegong Apang	INC/AC/UDF/BJP	11 years, 334 days	15 years, 218 days
2	Pema Khandu	BJP/INC/PPA	10 years, 86 days	
3	Mukut Mithi	AC(M)	4 years, 196 days	
4	Nabam Tuki	INC	4 years, 86 days	4 years, 90 days
5	Dorjee Khandu	INC	4 years, 21 days	
6	Jarbom Gamlin	INC	180 days	
7	Kalikho Pul	PPA	145 days	

== See also ==
- Deputy chief minister of Arunachal Pradesh
