= Gegong Apang =

3th Chief Minister of Arunachal Pradesh

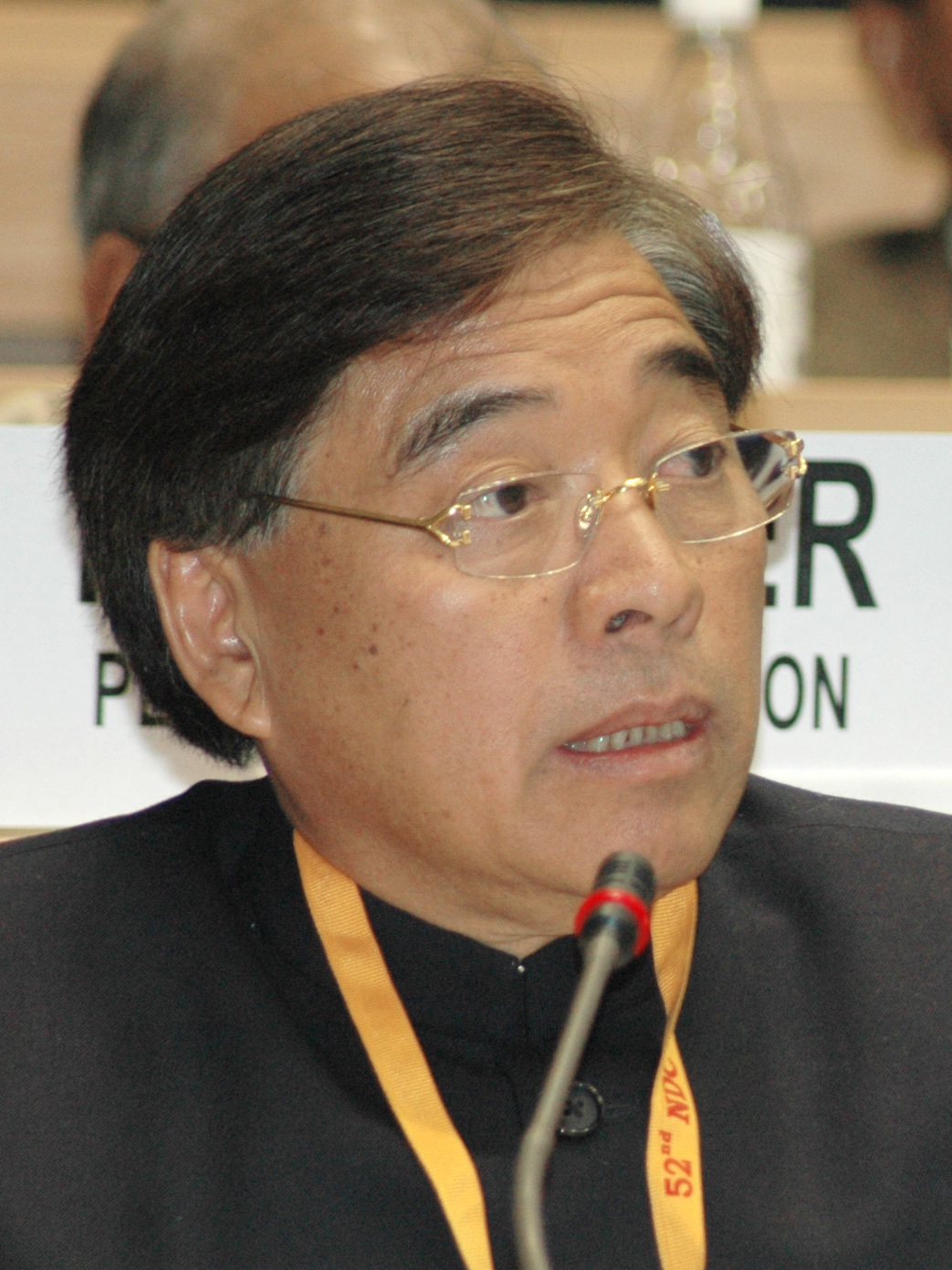
- Apang in 2006

3rd Chief Minister of Arunachal Pradesh
- In office 4 August 2003 – 9 April 2007
- Governor: Vinod Chandra Pande Shilendra Kumar SinghM. M. Jacob
- Preceded by: Mukut Mithi
- Succeeded by: Dorjee Khandu
- In office 18 January 1980 – 19 January 1999
- Governor: Bhishma Narain Singh R. D. PradhanGopal Singh (politician)Devi Das Thakur Lokanath Misra Surendranath Dwivedy Madhukar Dighe Mata Prasad
- Lieutenant Governor: R. N. HaldipurH. S. Dubey Thanjavelu Rajeshwar Shiva Swaroop
- Preceded by: President's Rule
- Succeeded by: Mukut Mithi

Personal details
- Born: 8 July 1949 (age 77) Upper Siang District, North-East Frontier Agency
- Party: Arunachal Democratic Party
- Other political affiliations: Indian National Congress (upto 1996, 2004–2014); Arunachal Congress (1996–2003); Bharatiya Janata Party (2003–2004, 2014–2019); United Democratic Front (2003); Janata Dal (Secular) (2019–2024)
- Spouse(s): Yadap Apang, late Dipti Apang

Gegong Apang (born 10 January 1947) is an Indian politician from Arunachal Pradesh. He served as the 3rd Chief Minister of Arunachal Pradesh from January 1980 to January 1999 and again from 4 August 2003 to 9 April 2007. He is a member of the Janata Dal (Secular) and was a member of the Indian National Congress before 2016. Apang is the Arunachal Pradesh's longest serving Chief Minister and also the fourth longest serving Chief Minister of an Indian state after Pawan Kumar Chamling of Sikkim, Jyoti Basu of West Bengal and Naveen Patnaik of Odisha.

== Political career ==
Gegong Apang started his political career as a member of the Congress Pradesh Council between 1972 and 1975 after passing out from JN College, Pasighat. He became the member of the first provisional Assembly between 1975 and 1978 and served as its agriculture minister in 1977. He was also elected to the first Legislative Assembly of the state in the year 1978 and was appointed its PWD and agriculture minister. Apang won the 1978, 1980 and 1984 assembly elections from Yingkiong-Pangin Assembly Constituency. Later he won the 1990, 1995, 2000 and 2004 assembly elections from Upper Siang district's Tuting-Yingkiong Assembly Constituency of Arunachal Pradesh.

Apang was chosen as Chief Minister for first time on 18 January 1980, after getting elected to the assembly for second time. He held the office until 1999, when he resigned, triggered by a no-confidence motion by a split in the Congress Party.

He was elected leader of the newly formed United Democratic Front, a coalition of his own political party, the Arunachal Congress and several others, in 2003. Only a few months later, Apang and his supporting MLAs merged with the Bharatiya Janata Party, the first time the BJP had ever ruled a state in north-eastern India. A few months after the BJP led National Democratic Alliance lost the 2004 general election, Apang returned to the Indian National Congress. In October 2004, Congress won the majority in state assembly election, making Apang return as the Chief Minister. He was in office as Chief Minister till 9 April 2007, when Congress MLAs revolted against his leadership under Dorjee Khandu, who succeeded him as chief minister and Congress Legislature Party leader. Mr.Apang, out of four terms as Chief Minister, headed Congress Government for three terms and one term from Arunachal Congress, regional party floated by him in 1996, after differences with the then Prime Minister PV Narasimha Rao over his demand for deportation of the Chakma-Hajong tribals from the tribal state.

Apang resigned from the primary membership of the Indian National Congress on 17 February 2014 (party sources said) and joined the Bharatiya Janata Party on 20 February 2014 prior to Indian general election and Arunachal Pradesh legislative assembly election. On 15 January 2019 he resigned from primary membership of Bharatiya Janata Party (BJP) by saying that "BJP now platform to seek power.". He joined Janata dal (Secular).

== Corruption charges ==
Apang was arrested on 24 August 2010 for alleged involvement in 1000 crore Public Distribution System scam. Apang denied the charges and claimed they are politically motivated, though the government under Chief Minister Dorjee Khandu maintained that the investigation was conducted independently without political interference. The scam allegedly involves fraudulent hill transport subsidy bills that were paid without the required financial oversight while he was the chief minister.

== Personal life ==
Apang was born on January 10, 1947, at Karko village in Upper Siang district. Apang is from Yingkiong, the headquarters of Upper Siang district in Arunachal Pradesh. He has three wives. One of Apang's sons was kidnapped at gun point in June 2008. Later that month he returned home safely, an unknown person to the Apang family who claimed to be of the same clan of Yadap Apang (Apang's wife) kidnapped him.
