= Pema Khandu =

9th Chief Minister of Arunachal Pradesh (born 1979)

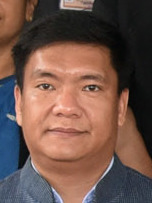
- Khandu in 2018

9th Chief Minister of Arunachal Pradesh
- Incumbent
- Assumed office 17 July 2016
- Governor: Jyoti Prasad Rajkhowa; Tathagata Roy; V. Shanmuganathan; Padmanabha Acharya; B. D. Mishra; Kaiwalya Trivikram Parnaik
- Deputy: Chowna Mein
- Cabinet: Khandu
- Departments: List: General Administration; Public Works Department (PWD); Personnel; Department s not allotted to any minister
- Preceded by: Nabam Tuki

Member of Arunachal Pradesh Legislative Assembly
- Incumbent
- Assumed office 13 May 2011
- Preceded by: Dorjee Khandu
- Constituency: Mukto

Personal details
- Born: 21 August 1979 (age 47) Tawang, Arunachal Pradesh, India
- Party: Bharatiya Janata Party (since 2016): Indian National Congress (until 2016); People's Party of Arunachal (September–December 2016)
- Spouse: Tsering Dolma
- Children: 5 (2 sons and 3 daughters)(Son - Tsering Khandu)
- Parent: Dorjee Khandu (father)
- Relatives: Tsering Tashi (brother)
- Education: Hindu College, Delhi

Pema Khandu (born 21 August 1979) is an Indian politician who is serving as the 9th and current Chief Minister of Arunachal Pradesh since 2016, as well as serving as leader of the house in the Arunachal Pradesh Legislative Assembly. He is the son of former Chief Minister Dorjee Khandu. Since assuming the office of the Chief Minister in July 2016, he and his government have twice changed their party affiliation; in September 2016 from the Indian National Congress to the People's Party of Arunachal, and then in December 2016 to the Bharatiya Janata Party. Previously he had served as Minister of Tourism, Urban Development and Water Resources in Nabam Tuki's government.

== Personal life ==
Khandu is the eldest son of former Chief Minister Dorjee Khandu. He hails from the Monpa tribe, an indigenous community primarily residing in the Tawang district of Arunachal Pradesh, India. He is a Buddhist by religion. He married Tsering Dolma and the couple has two sons and three daughters.

== Early life and education ==
Pema Khandu was born on August 21, 1979, in Tawang. He attended Government Secondary School in Bomba, Tawang, where he completed his schooling in 1995. Subsequently, he pursued his higher secondary education at Donyi-Polo Vidya Bhawan in Itanagar, completing it in 1997.

Then he enrolled at Hindu College to pursue his Bachelor in Arts degree in History. In 2000, he successfully graduated, marking the completion of his formal education.

== Career ==
=== Indian National Congress ===
Khandu assumed the post of secretary of the Arunachal Pradesh Congress Committee in 2005 and the Tawang District Congress Committee president in 2010. After his father's death, Khandu was included in the state government as Cabinet Minister for Water Resource Development and Tourism. He won the by-election to his father's constituency Mukto uncontested on 30 June 2011 as an Indian National Congress candidate. Subsequently, he was elected as Congress Legislature Party leader on 16 July 2016, replacing Nabam Tuki. In the 2014 Arunachal Pradesh Legislative Assembly election Khandu was re-elected unopposed from Mukto. He took the oath as the chief minister of Arunachal Pradesh on 17 July 2016 at the age of 36 years following a year-long political crisis.

=== Peoples Party of Arunachal ===
On 16 September 2016, 43 MLAs from the ruling party, under the CM Pema Khandu, defected from the Indian National Congress to the People's Party of Arunachal, an ally of the Bharatiya Janata Party.

=== Bharatiya Janata Party ===
On 21 December 2016, Khandu was suspended from the party by the Party President and Takam Pario was named as the next likely Chief Minister of Arunachal Pradesh replacing Khandu after the People's Party of Arunachal suspended Khandu along with 6 other MLAs.

In December 2016, Khandu, along with 33 of the People's Party of Arunachal’s 43 legislators, joined the Bharatiya Janata Party, leading to the BJP increasing its strength from 11 to 45 seats, gaining a majority in the Legislative Assembly with the support of two independents. He became the second Chief Minister of Arunachal Pradesh from the Bharatiya Janata Party in Arunachal Pradesh, after the Gegong Apang government in 2003.

In 2019 Arunachal Pradesh Legislative Assembly election, Khandu won in a landslide victory for Bharatiya Janata Party by winning 41 of 60 seats and its allies Janata Dal (United) with 7 states and National People's Party won 4 seats. Khandu took oath as Arunachal Pradesh Chief Minister on 29 May 2019.

In the 2024 Arunachal Pradesh Legislative Assembly election, Khandu won in a landslide victory for the Bharatiya Janata Party, winning 46 of 60 seats, with its allies the Nationalist Congress Party winning 3 seats, the National People's Party winning 5 seats and the People's Party of Arunachal winning 2 seats. Following this victory Khandu was re-elected as CM.

== Chief Minister of Arunachal Pradesh ==
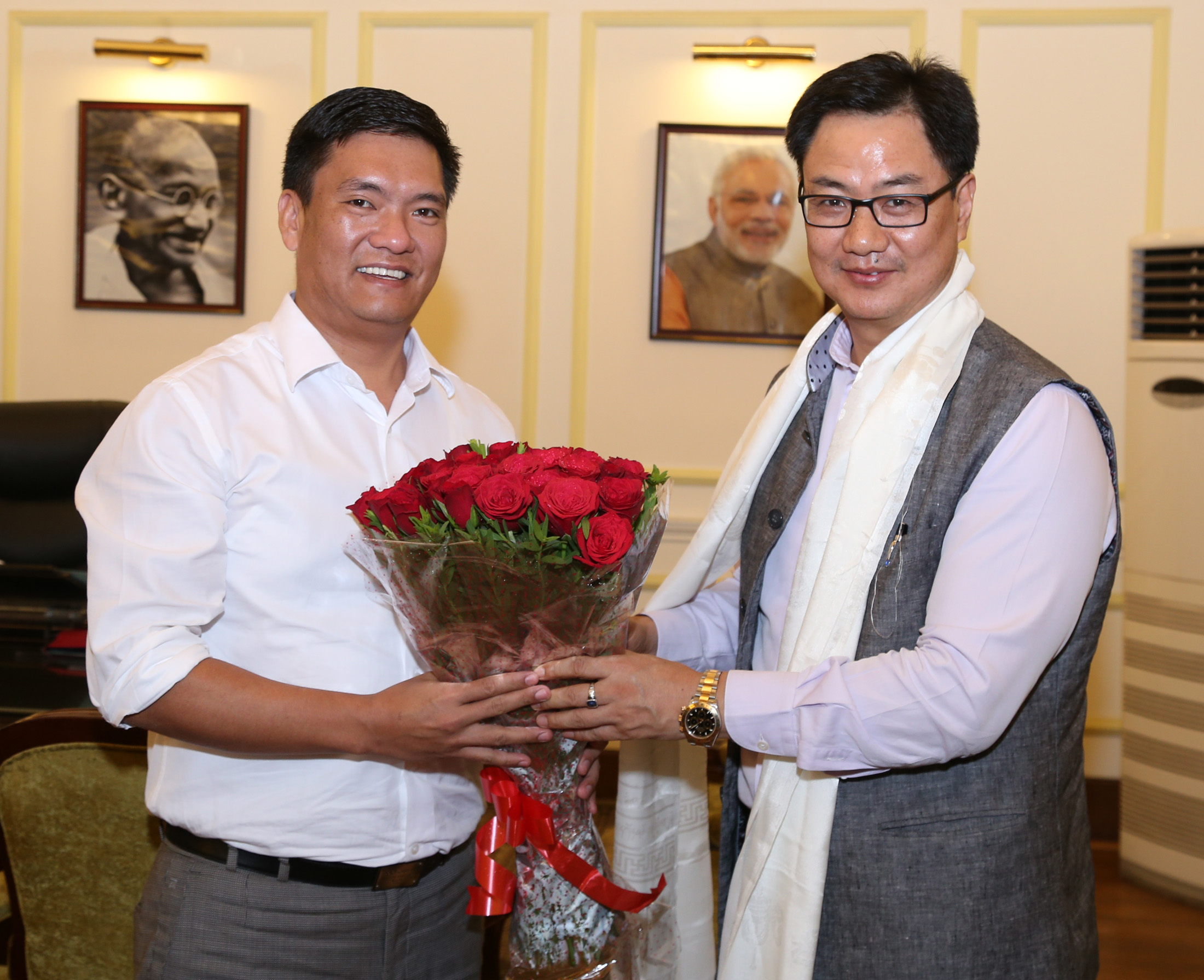
The Chief Minister of Arunachal Pradesh, Shri Pema Khandu calling on the Minister of State for Home Affairs, Shri Kiren Rijiju, in New Delhi on July 25, 2016

=== Taking Office ===
Pema Khandu assumed office as the Chief Minister of Arunachal Pradesh on July 17, 2016. The state's administrative landscape saw a transformation towards inclusive and transparent governance.

=== Special Campaigns ===
In 2018, the government of Arunachal Pradesh initiated the "Arunachal Rising Campaign" to highlight key state and central flagship programs at the grassroots level. Since its inception, extensive efforts have been undertaken in the remotest corners of each district to raise awareness among beneficiaries.

The Chief Minister visited every district, addressing mass public rallies during the Jan Sampark Yatra. During these rallies, ASHA members, Anganwadi workers, and progressive farmers were honored, while Gram Preraks (Publicity Agents) were appointed for each CD Block to disseminate information about state and central government flagship programs in villages where awareness was lacking. As part of this comprehensive campaign, teachers from secondary and higher secondary schools were designated as communicators to share information about government flagship programs among school children under the "Chief Minister's Youth Outreach Programme". This concerted effort aimed to ensure that the benefits of various schemes reached even the most remote areas of the state.

==== Sarkar Aapke Dwaar ====
Introduced in 2018, Sarkar Aapke Dwar (Government at Your Doorstep) stands as the Arunachal Pradesh government's expansive initiative for public outreach and grievance redressal. Led by Deputy Commissioners at the district level, the program entails Jan-Sunwai camps in blocks and panchayats on the first day of each month, addressing and resolving people's grievances on the spot. This initiative has now been termed as 'Seva Apke Dwar'.

The primary objective of Jan-Sunwai Sammelan is to streamline government services, offering citizens hassle-free access. Services encompass Aadhaar enrollment, e-ILP, Schedule Tribe certificates, Residence certificates, Income certificates, driving licenses, renewal of arms and weapons licenses, new account opening, distribution of items under the Ujala Yojana, and various other government programs, ensuring a comprehensive and efficient service delivery during the initiative.

==== Hamara Arunachal Abhiyan ====
Launched on 2 October 2019, the 150th anniversary of Mahatma Gandhi's birth, Hamara Arunachal Abhiyan is a comprehensive mass campaign initiated by the Government of Arunachal Pradesh. This campaign unfolds through a series of programs aimed at fostering a robust police-public partnership and dispelling social stigmas associated with the police force. The overarching goal is to engage all segments of society in maintaining law and order, fostering a sense of security and confidence among entrepreneurs, investors, and tourists.

Embedded within Hamara Arunachal Abhiyan are various sub-campaigns, each addressing specific social issues affecting the people of the state. These initiatives strive to oversee and investigate diverse challenges, contributing to a more inclusive and secure environment for Arunachal Pradesh.

== Social Life ==
Serving as the Chairman of the Bodhi Language and Literature Promotional Society, Pema Khandu has also worked for preservation of cultural and linguistic heritage. He has undertaken significant initiatives for environmental conservation and community health, including a widespread plantation drive in Tawang district and organizing periodic medical camps. Pema Khandu has actively promoted education through various programs in Tawang district, while also nurturing cultural vibrancy by patronizing talent searches and preserving traditional songs through singing talent shows in Tawang and West Kameng districts.

He has also fostered community engagement through organized games and sports at village, block, and district levels, and promoting civil-military relations through the annual celebration of Maitree Diwas, aiming for unity and cooperation between civilians and the military in the region.

=== Interests ===
In addition to his political engagements, Pema Khandu has been a patron of music, with a specific emphasis on highlighting the cultural heritage of the Monpa tribe by endorsing musicians and promoting Monpa songs.

Pema Khandu has been enthusiastic for various sports, including football, cricket, badminton, and volleyball. He has promoted sports by organizating cricket tournaments within his constituency. He also advocates for uplifting the state's athletes, enabling their participation in a diverse range of national and international sporting events. Since 2019, Khandu has served as the President of the Arunachal Pradesh Football Association.

Political offices
Preceded by Nabam Tuki	Chief Minister of Arunachal Pradesh; 17 July 2016 - Present	Succeeded by Incumbent
