= Rani Village =

- Village
- Village of East Siang
- Location in Arunachal Pradesh, India Rani Village (India)
- Coordinates: 27.96°N 95.31°E
- Country: India
- State: Arunachal Pradesh
- District: East Siang
- Circle: Sille-Oyan
- Founded: 1949

Government
  - Type: ZPM, MLA, MP
  - ZPM: Tajing Taki (INC)
  - MLA: Tatung Jamoh & Tangor Tapak
  - MP: Ninong Ering & Tapir Gao
- Elevation: 4.3 m (14 ft)

Population (Census 2011)
  - Total: 1,924
  - Rank: 3rd in East Siang District
- As on Census 2011
- Time zone: IST (UTC+5:30)
- STD: 791102
- Area code: 0368
- Students' Union Name: All Rani Students' Union (ARSU)
- Website: www.eastsiang.nic.in

Rani Village or Rani is a small village located in the Sille-Oyan circle of East Siang district, Arunachal Pradesh with a total of 924 residing families. It is situated 12 km from the district headquarter Pasighat and the 3rd largest village in the East Siang district, after Riga Village and Mirem Village.

== History ==
The name Rani is assumed to be derived from an archaeological site at Gomsi, where there might have resided a "Rani" (queen) during the medieval period (Probably of the Chutiya Kingdom). The site was excavated from an cultivation field of Rani Village. As per the Archaeological Survey of India it is assumed that the Rani of the Chutiya kingdom was residing there.

== Climate ==
Climate data for Rani Village
Month	Jan	Feb	Mar	Apr	May	Jun	Jul	Aug	Sep	Oct	Nov	Dec	Year
Mean daily maximum °C (°F)	26.5 (79.7)	28.5 (83.3)	31.7 (89.1)	33.0 (91.4)	35.1 (95.2)	36.6 (97.9)	36.6 (97.9)	36.5 (97.7)	36.0 (96.8)	33.5 (92.3)	31.0 (87.8)	27.5 (81.5)	32.7 (90.9)
Mean daily minimum °C (°F)	9.3 (48.7)	10.7 (51.3)	13.5 (56.3)	15.7 (60.3)	18.3 (64.9)	21.3 (70.3)	21.7 (71.1)	21.9 (71.4)	20.9 (69.6)	17.3 (63.1)	14.1 (57.4)	10.7 (51.3)	16.3 (61.3)
Average rainfall mm (inches)	42.8 (1.69)	96.1 (3.78)	144.6 (5.69)	259.5 (10.22)	371.0 (14.61)	847.8 (33.38)	1,081.1 (42.56)	670.6 (26.40)	583.7 (22.98)	231.7 (9.12)	29.1 (1.15)	30.3 (1.19)	4,388.3 (172.77)
Average rainy days	3.7	7.0	10.2	13.0	13.8	19.0	22.0	15.5	15.0	7.6	2.1	2.2	131.1
Source: India Meteorological Department

== Geographical location ==
It is located 12 km from Pasighat and 20 km from Ruksin.

== See also ==
- Bilat
- Ruksin
- Sika Tode
