= Bilat (India) =

Bilat Village
- Village
- Village of East Siang
- Motto: To lead the darkness into light
- Interactive map of Bilat Village
- Country: India
- State: Arunachal Pradesh
- district: East Siang
- Founded: 1960

Government
  - Type: ZPM, MLA, MP
  - ZPM: Tajing Taki (INC)
  - MLA: Tatung Jamoh & Tangor Tapak
  - MP: Ninong Ering & Tapir Gao
- Time zone: UTC+05:30 (Asia/Kolkata)
- Website: www.eastsiang.nicin

Bilat is a village situated under the East Siang district, Arunachal Pradesh. The Village is 40 km away from its district headquarters Pasighat and is in the bank of the Peneng river.
