= Mirem Village =

- Village
- Village of East Siang
- Motto: To lead the darkness into light
- Interactive map of Mirem Village
- Coordinates: 27°57′24″N 95°12′14″E
- Country: India
- State: Arunachal Pradesh
- District: East Siang
- Founded: 1960

Government
  - Type: ZPM, MLA, MP
  - ZPM: (INC)
  - MLA: Tatung Jamoh & Tangor Tapak
  - MP: Ninong Ering & Tapir Gao
- Time zone: UTC−5
- Website: www.eastsiang.nicin

Mirem Village is a village situated under the Bilat Circle Block of East Siang District, Arunachal Pradesh. It is the second largest village of East Siang District after Riga Village. The Village has given its name after the amazing God gifted water spring in the village. The word Mirem in Adi language means 'rich', it means that the village has a huge water spring.
