= Bharatiya Janata Party – Arunachal Pradesh =

Arunachal Pradesh affiliate of the Bharatiya Janata Party

- Abbreviation: BJP
- Leader: Pema Khandu (Chief Minister of Arunachal Pradesh)
- President: Kaling Moyong (MLA from Pasighat East Assembly constituency)
- Founder: Atal Bihari Vajpayee; Lal Krishna Advani; Murli Manohar Joshi; Nanaji Deshmukh; K. R. Malkani; Sikandar Bakht; Vijay Kumar Malhotra; Vijaya Raje Scindia; Bhairon Singh Shekhawat; Shanta Kumar; Ram Jethmalani; Jagannathrao Joshi
- Founded: 6 April 1980 (46 years ago)
- Split from: Janata Party
- Preceded by: Bharatiya Jana Sangh (1951–1977); Janata Party (1977–1980)
- Headquarters: State BJP Office, opposite Arunodaya School Vivek Vihar, Itanagar-791113, India
- Youth wing: Bharatiya Janata Yuva Morcha
- Women's wing: BJP Mahila Morcha
- Labour wing: Bharatiya Mazdoor Sangh
- Peasant's wing: Bharatiya Kisan Sangh
- Ideology: Hindutva (Hindu nationalism); National conservatism; Neoliberalism
- Colours: Saffron
- Alliance: National level National Democratic Alliance; NorthEast Region; North East Democratic Alliance
- Seats in Rajya Sabha: 1 / 1 (as of 2022)
- Seats in Lok Sabha: 2 / 2 (as of 2024)
- Seats in Arunachal Pradesh Legislative Assembly: 46 / 60 (as of 2024)

Election symbol
- Lotus

Party flag

Website
- www.bjp.org/arunachal-pradesh

The Bharatiya Janata Party – Arunachal Pradesh (pronounced [bʱaːɾ(ə)ˈtiːjə dʒən(ə)ˈtaː ˈpaːrʈiː]; lit. 'Indian People's Party'; BJP Arunachal Pradesh) is the state unit of the Bharatiya Janata Party of the Arunachal Pradesh. Its head office is situated at the State BJP Office, opposite Arunodaya School Vivek Vihar, Itanagar-791113, India. The current president of BJP Arunachal Pradesh is Kaling Moyong.

== Electoral performance ==
=== Lok Sabha Election ===
Year	Seats won	+/-	Outcome
2004	2 / 2	–	Opposition
2009	0 / 2	▼2	Opposition
2014	1 / 2	▲1	Government
2019	2 / 2	▲1	Government
2024	2 / 2	–	Government

=== Legislative Assembly Election ===
Year	Seats won	+/-	Voteshare (%)	+/- (%)	Outcome
1984	1 / 60	New	7.69%	New	Opposition
1990	Not contested				
1995	0 / 60	-	3.37%	-	None
1999	0 / 60	0	10.83%	▲7.46%	None
2004	9 / 60	▲9	2.63%	▼8.2%	Opposition
2009	3 / 60	▼6	5.21%	▲2.58%	Opposition
2014	11 / 60	▲8	30.97%	▲25.76%	Opposition, later Government
2019	41 / 60	▲30	50.9%	▲20%	Government
2024	46 / 60	▲5	54.37%	▲3.47%	Government

== Leadership ==
=== State Presidents ===
No.	Name	Remarks	Term	Term
1.				
2.	Tapir Gao	2 timesMember of Parliament, Lok Sabha from Arunachal East.		
3.	Biyuram Wahge	Cabinet Minister in Fifth Pema Khandu ministry.3 times Member of Arunachal Pradesh Legislative Assembly from Pakke-Kessang	17 January 2020 – 18 January 2025	
4.	Kaling Moyong	2 time Member of Arunachal Pradesh Legislative Assembly from Pasighat East	18 January-Incumbent	

=== Chief ministers ===
No.	Portrait	Name	Constituency	Term of office			Assembly
1		Gegong Apang	Tuting–Yingkiong	2003	2004		6th
2		Pema Khandu	Mukto	31 December 2016	29 May 2019	9 years, 210 days	9th
2		Pema Khandu	Mukto	29 May 2019	Incumbent	9 years, 210 days	10th

=== Rajya Sabha members ===
No.	Name	Term start	Term end	Term
1.	Nabam Rebia	24-Jun-2020	23-Jun-2026	3

=== Lok Sabha members ===
No.	Constituency	Name	Chief Minister	State President
2024	Arunachal West	Kiren Rijiju	Pema Khandu	Biyuram Wahge
2024	Arunachal East	Tapir Gao	Pema Khandu	Biyuram Wahge
2019	Arunachal West	Kiren Rijiju	Pema Khandu	Tapir Gao
2019	Arunachal East	Tapir Gao	Pema Khandu	Tapir Gao
2014	Arunachal West	Kiren Rijiju	Nabam Tuki	
2004	Arunachal West	Kiren Rijiju	Gegong Apang	
2004	Arunachal East	Tapir Gao	Gegong Apang	

== See also ==
- Bharatiya Janata Party
- National Democratic Alliance
- North East Democratic Alliance
- National People's Party
