= Government Secondary School, Rani =

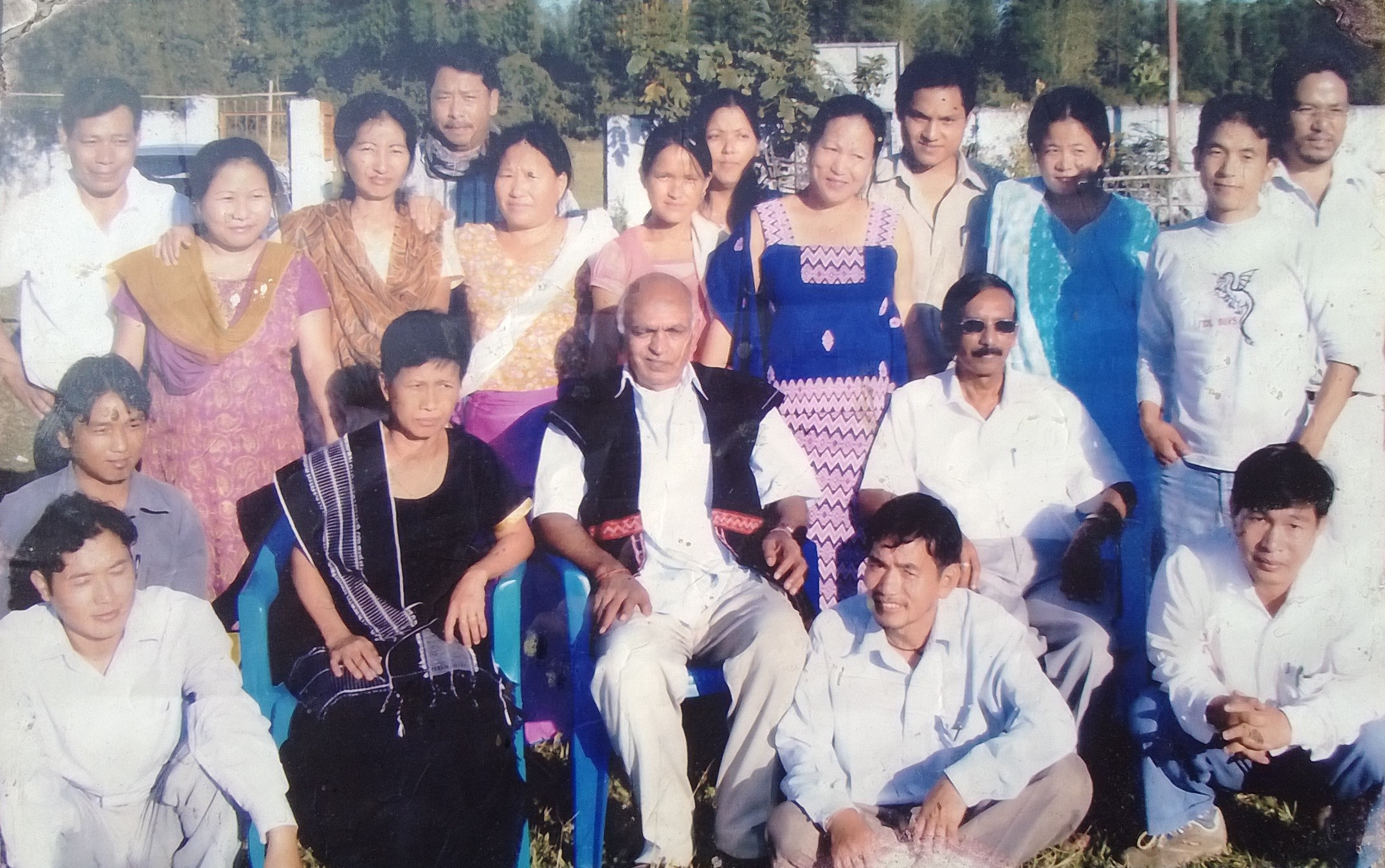

Location
- 7-Mile, Rani Village; Pasighat, Arunachal Pradesh; India

Information
- Type: Government
- Established: 1964
- Status: Active
- School district: East Siang District
- Headmaster: T. Tamuk
- Nickname: Rani School, Kemi School
- Affiliation: Central Board of Secondary Education, New Delhi

Government Secondary School, Rani formerly known as Government Middle School, Rani is a government level school in East Siang District, Arunachal Pradesh. The School Has been established in the year 1964 as a Middle School, and upgraded to Secondary Level in the year 2013.

== Notable alumni ==
- Tangor Tapak Politician and Former Minister of Health & Family Welfare of Arunachal Pradesh.
