= Peter Loren Seton James =

British Indian Officer

Abor Hills District

Political Officer
- In office June 1920 – September 1948
- Monarch: George VI
- Governor General: Lord Mountbatten
- Governor: Andrew Clow
- Preceded by: Geoffrey Allen
- Succeeded by: Government of India

Personal details
- Citizenship: British
- Spouse: Omin T. James
- Children: 2 daughters, 1 Son
- Occupation: Colonial administrator
- Known for: Political Officer in the Abor Hills frontier administration

Peter Loren Seton James (also known among the Adi as Jam Haap, Jame Sab, and Jame Migom) was a British colonial administrator who served as the last Political Officer of the Abor Hills. He was based at Pasighat in what is now East Siang district, Arunachal Pradesh. He married an Adi woman and remained at the post until September 1948, when he formally transferred the control over to the Government of India.

== Administration ==
James was noted in service reports for fluency in the Adi language and familiarity with Adi social customs. His tour diaries record that he stayed with communities during tours rather than maintaining separate camp arrangements.

He was also regarded by contemporaries as knowledgeable in Moshup Abang, which is a genre of Adi oral poetry, and is recorded as having performed as lead performer, in the ponnung ceremonial dance.

The names used for James among Adi communities varied by area and register. Jam Haap was a colloquial form of his surname; Jame Sab incorporated the Hindustani sahab; Jame Migom was used by communities upriver.

His tour diaries from August 1945 to December 1946 are held at the Arunachal Pradesh State Archives in the NEFA Secretariat bundle. His diaries from January to September 1948 are filed under File No. 2043/GA/95/48 at the same repository.

James served at Pasighat through the final years of British administration in the frontier tracts. As independence approached, Moje Riba, a trader from what is now West Siang district, established the Dipa Congress Committee and organised among tribal communities in the valley. The colonial administration arrested Riba and other Congress members, who were then held at Pasighat. James was subsequently removed from his post and the detainees were released. On 15 August 1947, Riba hoisted the Indian national flag at Dipa village, which was the first such hoisting recorded in the region.

== Handover ==
Prior to Indian independence, James actively advocated for the Abor Hills to be administered as a separate Crown Colony, petitioning the Viceroy and Sir Coupland against its integration into India. Although he reasoned that the region should not be merged with India on account of its distinct cultural character, later accounts described that this position of him was personal as he had concerns over the difficulties his wife and children would face in relocating with him to England. James remained at Pasighat following independence and formally handed over the Abor Hills district to the Indian government in September 1948. At his departure, he delivered an address to communities of the Siang valley:

As we [the British] are going, others will come. They may try to encroach upon your culture but never let them win. Preserve your rich way of life. But to do so, you have to educate your children. Let them study because with the power of knowledge, they can overcome any kinds of hurdles in life.

The address is cited in later accounts as an early articulation of the value of formal education in the hill tracts, where schools remained scarce at the time of the handover.

== Legacy ==
James was one of the last of a succession of British officers at Pasighat that dated to the establishment of the post after the Anglo-Abor War of 1911 to 1912. The administrative networks he maintained, including the interpreter and native agent system, were inherited by his Indian successors.

Among those who worked closely with James was Political Interpreter Tati Lego, who had served as his interpreter, aid and protege across the Siang valley. Lego continued in administrative service after the handover and retired in 1983, receiving certificates of appreciation from Governor of Assam Saiyid Fazl Ali in 1959 and from K. H. Mehta, Adviser to the Governor of Assam, for his role in peace negotiations during the Achingmori incident of 1953 alongside pioneering the construction of the Mebo-Dhola Road.

His tour diary series, spanning 1945 to 1948, continued to serve as an administrative reference in the early years of Indian administration. The district was absorbed into the North-East Frontier Agency in 1951. The Siang headquarters has since then moved from Pasighat to Along in 1952, and the title of Political Officer was eventually replaced by Deputy Commissioner in 1965 when NEFA administration was passed over to the Ministry of Home Affairs.

== See also ==
- Pasighat
- Abor Hills
- North-East Frontier Agency
- Adi people
