= Sine, Arunachal Pradesh =

Sine Village
- Village
- Village of East Siang
- Location in Arunachal Pradesh, India Sine Village (India)
- Coordinates: 28.402105°N 94.845986°E
- Country: India
- State: Arunachal Pradesh
- District: East Siang
- Circle: Boleng

Government
  - Type: MLA, MP
  - MLA: Tapang Taloh
  - MP: Ninong Ering
- As on Census 2011
- Time zone: IST (UTC+5:30)
- STD: 791102
- Website: www.eastsiang.nic.in

Sine is a village in the Boleng Circle of East Siang District, Arunachal Pradesh.

== Language ==
Adi, English, Hindi and Sino-Tibetan are the main languages in use.

== Literacy ==
Census of 2001 records a total population of 438 inhabitants composed of 215 illiterate and 223 literate people. 146 males and 77 females are reported as literates.

== Location ==
Sine is located 31 km away from the Boleng circle office.

== Fire Incident ==
A fire which occurred on the midnight of 7 December 2014 was reported to have gutted 32 out of the total 64 houses in Sine leaving many families homeless. Loss of livestock was also reported and one person was known to have sustained burns requiring medical attention. The fire was the second to occur in the East Siang & West Siang (Siang Belt) within a span of one month. Earlier, Kerang Village under Kaying Circle of West Siang district also experienced a fire, on 12 November 2014, in which 70 houses were reportedly burnt down.

== See also ==
- Kerang Village
