= Gomsi =

Archaeological site in Arunachal Pradesh, India

- Interactive map of Gomsi
- 28.07°N 95.33°E
- Type: Settlement
- Location: Rani Village, East Siang District, Arunachal Pradesh, India
- Region: India

History
- Built: 13th-14th century
- Built by: expected as Chutia King

Site notes
- Condition: Ruined
- Owner: Public
- Management: Archaeological Survey of India
- Public access: Yes
- It is now undertaken by the Govt. of India

Gomsi is an ancient archaeological site located between Rani Village and Sika Tode in East Siang District, Arunachal Pradesh, India. It is dated to the 13th-14th century by the Directorate of Research, Government of Arunachal Pradesh and is associated with the Chutia Kingdom. It is located at the field of Rani Village, about 15 km from the town of Pasighat.

It might have acted as a checkpoint of the Chutia kingdom to keep peace in the region as well to control the trade exchanges at that period. There is also an ancient man-made pond(pukhuri) built as a part of the settlement.

== Excavation at Gomsi ==
=== Report of 1995-96 ===
The Directorate of Research, Government of Arunachal Pradesh, conducted trial-excavation at the main mound and at extreme northwestern corner of the site which comprised 5 acres of land. The site is located at 15 km in the southwestern direction from the district headquarters, Pasighat and 19 km inside from Murkong Salak, nearest Railwayhead in Assam-Arunachal border.

A portion of brick-wall was exposed out of a house structure. Excavation of almost rectangular mound (21x17 m), revealed ten brick courses to the northwestern corner of the wall showing both the base and the floor levels. Above the floor level, a superstructure was raised by using some perishable material.

In all, there were thirteen different sizes and shapes of bricks, used for construction. The excavation also revealed different types of pottery along with a few pieces of stone urn. Black painted pottery, with criss-cross design and a piece of flower vase were recovered from the digging in addition to an iron spear-head, besides one spear-head made of iron from 15 cm below surface level.

From the preliminary study of the findings, the site could be assignable to the Chutia period(pre-Ahom period).

=== Report of 1996-97 ===
The site is spread in an area of 11.5 acres of land. Excavation revealed that the site represents a large brick mound with L-shaped large earthen mound measuring (23 m x 23 m x 24 m) about 3 m south of it and a rectangular pond measuring 38 m x 28 m about 60 m south of the mound. These are surrounded by nala measuring 3.5 m wide from all corners and both ends meeting in the pond. The nala served a dual purpose of a moat and a source of water supply. A number of small earthen mounds measuring about 14 m x 10 m are also situated in the vicinity at regular intervals.
