= Pasighat =

- Town
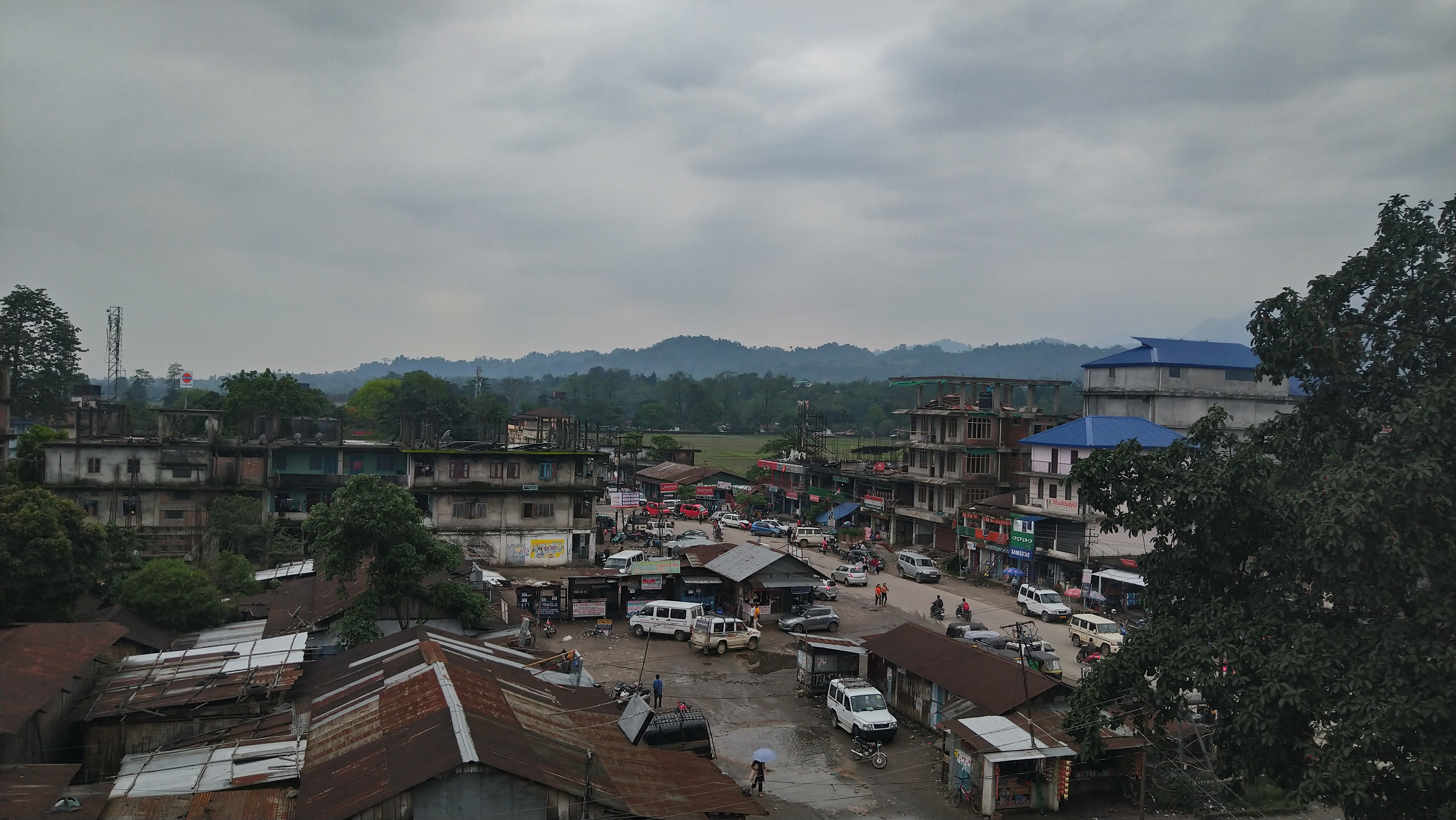
- A view of Pasighat from Hotel Siang

- Location in Arunachal Pradesh, India Pasighat (India)
- Coordinates: 28.07°N 95.33°E
- Country: India
- State: Arunachal Pradesh
- District: East Siang
- Established: 1911

Government
  - Type: Municipal Council
  - Body: Pasighat Municipal Council
  - Chairman: Tagom Padung (PPA)
  - Deputy Chairman: Kamin Lego (PPA)
  - Lok Sabha MP: Tapir Gao (BJP)
  - MLAs: Ninong Ering (BJP) (Pasighat West); Tapi Darang (PPA) (Pasighat East)
  - Deputy Commissioner: Sonalika Jiwani, IAS

Area
  - Total: 14.60 km^{2} (5.64 sq mi)
- Elevation: 152 m (499 ft)

Population (2011)
  - Total: 24,656
  - Density: 1,504.9/km^{2} (3,898/sq mi)

Languages
  - Official: English; Hindi; Adi
- Time zone: UTC+5:30 (IST)
- PIN: 791102
- Telephone code: 0368
- ISO 3166 code: IN-AR
- Vehicle registration: AR-09
- Climate: Cwa
- Website: www.pasighat.com

Pasighat is the headquarters of East Siang district in the Indian state of Arunachal Pradesh. Situated at the eastern foothills of the Himalayas at 155 metres (509 ft) above mean sea level, Pasighat is Arunachal's oldest town. The Government of India included Pasighat in the Smart Cities Mission development scheme in June 2017.

It hosts Pasighat Airport, an Advance Landing Ground (ALG) of Indian Air Force.

== History ==
The site of present-day Pasighat was known to the Adi people before British contact as Paklek (also Paglek), a name understood to derive from the Adi word for banana (kopak), with the settlement taking its present name from the Pasi, one of the Adi sub-tribes who were among its earliest inhabitants. Before the Pasi and other Adi communities settled the foothills around the Siang River, the area had earlier been inhabited by Dibu-Marang clans, whose displacement by incoming Adi groups is recorded in local oral tradition.

Pasighat was formally founded in 1911 by the British Raj as a gateway to administrative convenience of the greater Abor Hills and the north area in general. Primarily, there were settlements of Adi tribesmen, who are still living in the villages in and around Pasighat. Cognizance of Pasighat emerged due to the last Anglo-Abor War that was fought in 1912 subsequent to the fourth Anglo-Abor War in 1894. This necessitated the first-ever administrative headquarters being established here with an Assistant Political Officer posted. T. E. Furze, an Imperial Police officer, was the first Assistant Political Officer appointed to Pasighat, taking up the post in 1912. In its earliest years, small trading shops run by Marwari and Bihari merchants brought by the British from Sadiya served the needs of the administration, and Nepali porters who arrived with British columns from the 1930s onward formed another strand of the town's early population.

Under the Government of India Act 1919, the frontier tracts were placed under the direct authority of the Governor of Assam and declared Backward Tracts. The Government of India Act 1935 renamed them Excluded Areas in 1936, placing them outside the legislative competence of the Assam assembly. Between 1943 and 1948 the tracts were reorganised into five agencies: Sela, Subansiri, Abor, Mishmi and Tirap, with Pasighat remaining the seat of the Abor subdivision throughout.

Among the officers who served as Assistant Political Officer at Pasighat during the British period, Peter Loren Seton James was the last. He was known to the Adi communities of the Siang valley by several names: Jam Haap, an informal rendering of his surname; Jame Sab, from the Hindustani sahab; and Jame Migom, the name used by communities further up the river. He spoke Adi fluently, lived alongside the people he administered when on tour, and was recognised as an authority on Moshup Abang, a traditional form of Adi oral verse. He was also known to take the role of miri, the lead performer, in the ponnung ceremonial dance, a level of participation unusual for a colonial officer. As independence approached, the colonial administration arrested the Congress organiser Moje Riba and others at Pasighat in response to nationalist activity in the frontier tracts; James was subsequently removed from his post and those detained were released. On 15 August 1947, Riba hoisted the Indian national flag at Dipa village, the first such ceremony in the region. James formally handed the Abor Hills district to the Government of India in September 1948, delivering a farewell address to the Adi communities urging them to preserve their culture and to invest in the education of their children.

In the post-independence era, Pasighat is credited with the first Airfield (near Paglek, P. I. Line) established in 1946. The original market area of the town, which lay closer to the Siang River, was washed away by flooding, and the present market was established in 1955. Road connections from Pasighat to Jonai, to Mebo, to Oryamghat and to Along were built from 1963, and electricity reached the town in 1975. The first Agricultural Institute in Arunachal Pradesh was also established at Pasighat in 1950. Other forms of later infrastructural development include:

- General Hospital (established 1954, although some claim it as old as the town itself)
- Co-operative society Ltd (1957)
- Nurse Training Centre (affiliated to General Hospital)
- Jawaharlal Nehru College - the first college in Arunachal Pradesh (established 3 July 1964)
- The first All India Radio Station in the state in 1966
- Govt. Polytechnic College, Pasighat
- College of Horticulture and Forestry, CAU (2001)
- Pasighat Airport
- Pasighat Railway Station
- Rashtriya Raksha University, Pasighat
- Arunachal Pradesh University, Pasighat (https://apupsg.ac.in/). It is the lone state university in Arunachal Pradesh, established on July 1, 2022, under the Arunachal Pradesh University Act, 2012, passed by the Arunachal Pradesh State Legislative Assembly.

Early proponents for moving the state capital from Shillong (the then NEFA), underlined Pasighat's better infrastructure. However, the privilege was lost to the present capital Itanagar in 1974. The only significant development in Pasighat that came after that was the College Of Horticulture and Forestry Central Agriculture University established on 7 March 2001.

== Geography ==
Pasighat is located at 28.07°N 95.33°E. It has an average elevation of 153 metres or 502 feet. Pasighat has a typical lowland Northeast India humid subtropical climate (Köppen Cwa) a little too cool to qualify as a tropical monsoon climate (Am).

The unique trough-like features surrounded by high hills on three sides make Pasighat ideal for attracting rain-bearing clouds that come in from the Assam plain. The rain-bearing wind gets obstructed by the hills and brings exceptionally heavy rainfall from June to September when the average monthly rainfall is 796 millimetres or 31.34 inches – equivalent to over 1 inch or 25.4 millimetres per day. Winter is marked by strong, cool, dry northeasterly winds from the Siberian High, which make Pasighat fog-free even in winter. Days during the “cool” season from November to February are generally warm and clear, whilst the “hot” spring season from March to May sees an increasing frequency of heavy thunder downpours and very warm to hot, humid weather with even mornings warm.

The largest river system of the State, "Siang" or "Dihang", the main tributary of Brahmaputra River emerges to the foothills plain after traversing Tibetan Plateau and beyond Siang River Valley at Pasighat. Once it crosses Pasighat town, the river flows southward heading toward the expanse of Assam plains. The river course enters the plains and continues flowing south-west where it converges with the other major left-bank tributaries, viz. Dibang and Lohit near Kobo Ghat riverine island system to form the mighty Brahmaputra River in the plains.

=== Climate ===
Climate data for Pasighat (1991–2020, extremes 1957–present)
Month	Jan	Feb	Mar	Apr	May	Jun	Jul	Aug	Sep	Oct	Nov	Dec	Year
Record high °C (°F)	29.6 (85.3)	34.0 (93.2)	34.0 (93.2)	37.3 (99.1)	39.6 (103.3)	38.6 (101.5)	39.7 (103.5)	38.5 (101.3)	38.0 (100.4)	36.2 (97.2)	33.0 (91.4)	30.2 (86.4)	39.7 (103.5)
Mean daily maximum °C (°F)	23.2 (73.8)	24.4 (75.9)	25.9 (78.6)	27.4 (81.3)	29.4 (84.9)	30.5 (86.9)	30.6 (87.1)	31.4 (88.5)	30.9 (87.6)	29.8 (85.6)	27.6 (81.7)	24.5 (76.1)	27.6 (81.7)
Mean daily minimum °C (°F)	13.0 (55.4)	15.0 (59.0)	17.4 (63.3)	19.6 (67.3)	21.8 (71.2)	23.8 (74.8)	24.2 (75.6)	24.6 (76.3)	23.7 (74.7)	21.4 (70.5)	17.5 (63.5)	14.2 (57.6)	19.6 (67.3)
Record low °C (°F)	6.5 (43.7)	6.6 (43.9)	10.6 (51.1)	12.5 (54.5)	11.3 (52.3)	18.9 (66.0)	19.1 (66.4)	20.1 (68.2)	17.4 (63.3)	13.4 (56.1)	8.3 (46.9)	7.2 (45.0)	6.5 (43.7)
Average rainfall mm (inches)	42.9 (1.69)	88.6 (3.49)	154.0 (6.06)	266.6 (10.50)	411.6 (16.20)	765.1 (30.12)	1,033 (40.67)	611.7 (24.08)	564.5 (22.22)	177.1 (6.97)	33.1 (1.30)	16.9 (0.67)	4,165.1 (163.98)
Average rainy days	3.7	6.3	9.9	13.4	14.4	18.8	20.4	15.1	13.9	7.1	2.1	1.6	126.7
Average relative humidity (%) (at 17:30 IST)	70	68	70	73	76	82	84	83	83	81	76	73	76
Source: India Meteorological Department

== Economy ==
Agriculture is the main occupation of the local people. Rice is the main food crop produced in the area. There are several large tea gardens in the vicinity of the town which attract workers from all over the region. Lumbering was a big sustaining industry till the Supreme Court clamped down on the industry during the 1990s. There is also a bit of tourism in Pasighat, being the oldest town in Arunachal Pradesh. Agriculture, horticulture, and tourism continue to be the main source of economy for the town.

== Demography ==
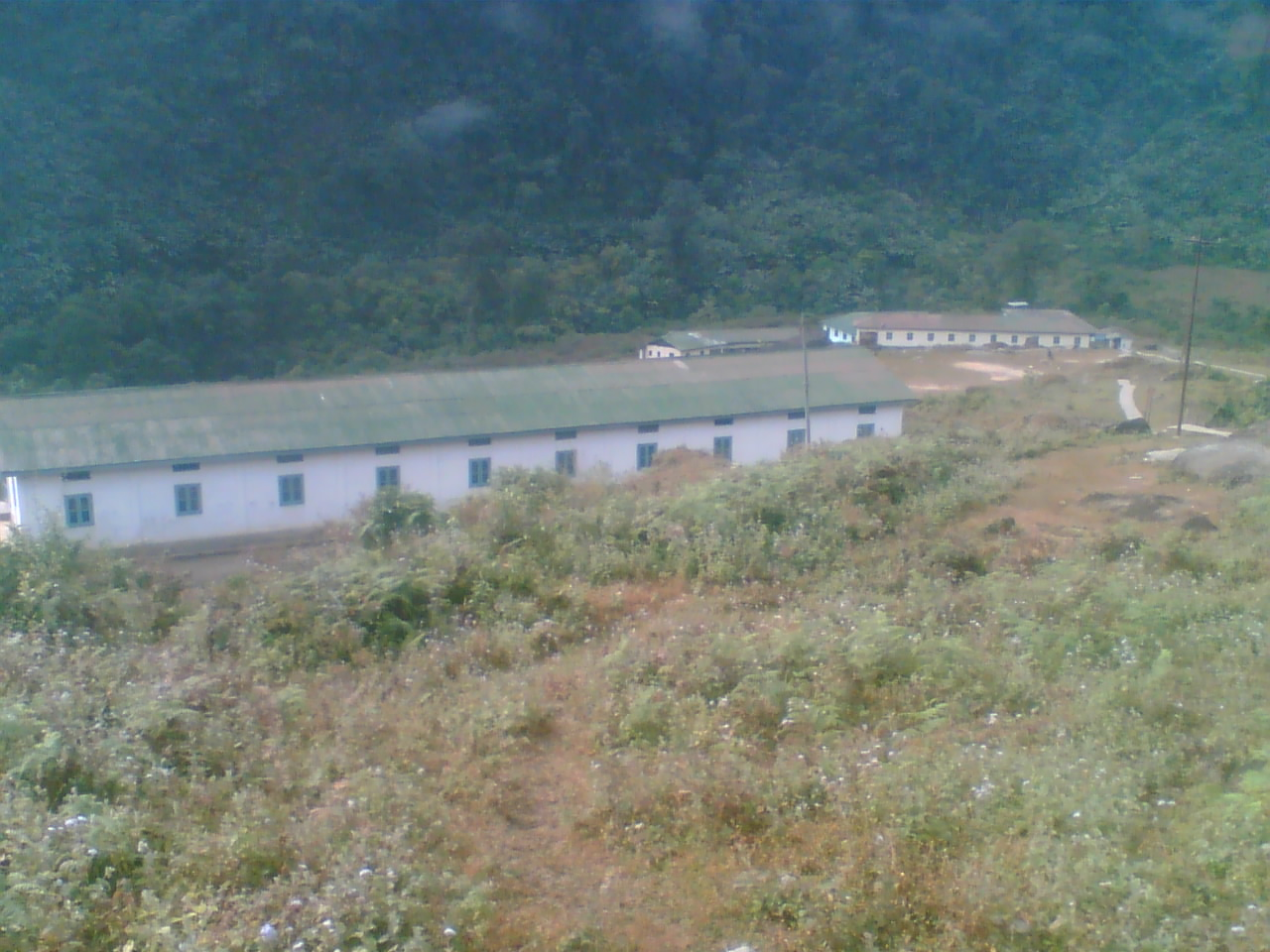
The Vivekananda Kendriya Vidyalaya school in Pasighat

As of 2011 India Census, Pasighat had a population of 24,656. Males constitute 50.62% (12,482 males) of the population and females 49.37% (12,174 females). Pasighat has an average literacy rate of 79.6%: male literacy is 85.33%, and female literacy is 73.74%. In Pasighat, 12% of the population is under six years of age.

Pasighat is predominantly inhabited by the Adi people.

=== Languages ===
Languages spoken in Pasighat (2011)
1. Adi (36.8%)
2. Nepali (17.3%)
3. Bengali (10.6%)
4. Bhojpuri (10.2%)
5. Hindi (7.73%)
6. Assamese (4.79%)
7. Others (12.6%)

According to 2011 census, Adi was the most spoken language with 9,074 speakers followed by Nepali at 4,269, Bengali at 2,621, Bhojpuri at 2,511, Hindi at 1,905 and Assamese at 1,181.

== Culture ==
The people of Pasighat celebrate a variety of festivals. Solung, Aran, and Etor are important festivals. Legend has it that the festival regarded as Solung, which is the principal festival of the Adi, came into existence when the Goddess of wealth, Kiine-Naane, had asked them in person to carry out this worship or 'puja'.

Solung is celebrated by the Adis for five days in the month of September. The first day or the Solung Gidi Dogin is the day when they prepare for this event. Doreph Long, the second day is the day of animal slaughters. Binnyat Binam or the third day is the day of prayers. Taktor of Ekoph is the fourth day and on this day arms and ammunition are manufactured. Miri or the fifth day is the day of farewell.

The Adi people are known for their colourful Ponung dance and war dance called Taapu.

== Transport connectivity ==
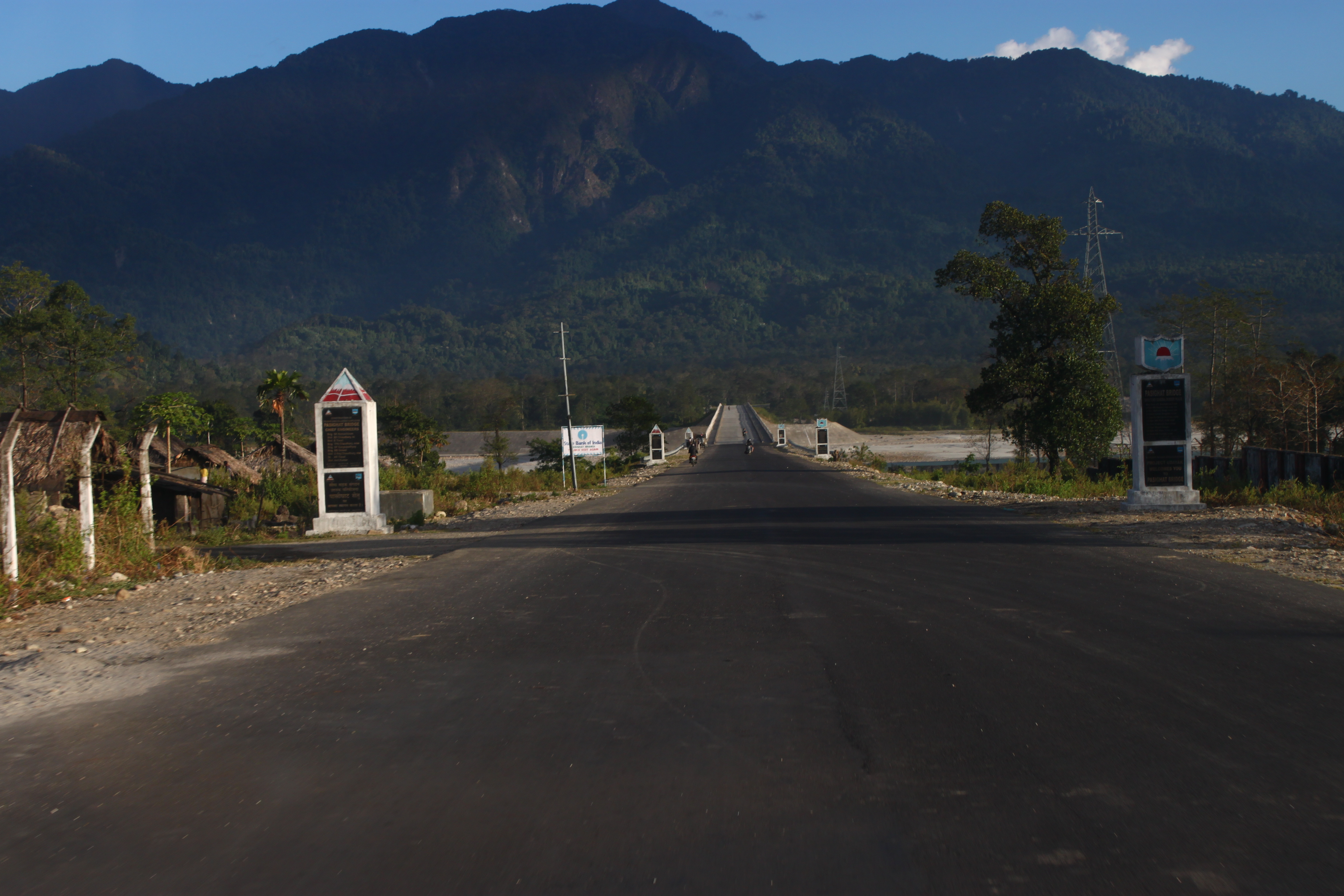
Raneghat Bridge over River Siang (Brahmaputra)

Pasighat is connected by national highway NH-515 and have frequent bus services from Guwahati, Lakhimpur and Itanagar. Waterways crossing the Brahmaputra River from Dibrugarh by ferry to Oryamghat that is situated at a distance of 32 km from Pasighat and can take a bus or taxi. Nearest rail head is at Murkongselek which is terminal station of the Rangia-Murkongselek broad gauge track.

The railway line from Murkongselek has been extended by 16 km to Sille in Arunachal Pradesh. Sille railway station was commissioned in February 2026. The 10 km railway track from Sille to Pasighat is being laid. Pasighat railway station is planned to be commissioned by the end of 2026.

The 227-km Murkongselek-Pasighat-Tezu-Rupai line is being undertaken as a strategic project. The rail head is being extended up to Pasighat. The 26 km long new railway line will link North-Assam area with Pasighat town, the district headquarter of East Siang of Arunachal. About 24.5 km of the route falls in Arunachal territory. The Rangia - Murkongselek BG conversion (with extension up to Pasighat) project was one of the two major rail projects in Northeast announced in 2010. This broad gauge line is supposed to be proceeding on to Roing, Parsuramkund, Rupai, and other places in the state. A preliminary engineering-traffic survey for the Pasighat-Tezu-Parshuram Kund was conducted by Northeast Frontier Railways at the request of the state government.

Arunachal Pradesh State Transport Services (APSTS) is another means of transportation in the district which is linked with other districts and nearby villages. APSTS buses are also run from Pasighat to Itanagar, the capital of the state, from Pasighat to Shillong, Meghalaya via Guwahati on the daily basis. Bus services are available to Guwahati, Assam which are run by private operators. Private-owned Winger and Tata Sumo services also run across the district and run in the other districts. Also, regular flights from Pasighat to Guwahati and Guwahati to Pasighat on selected weekdays have also started since April 2018. Guwahati and Kolkata are connected with Pasighat Airport by Alliance Air.

== Tourism ==
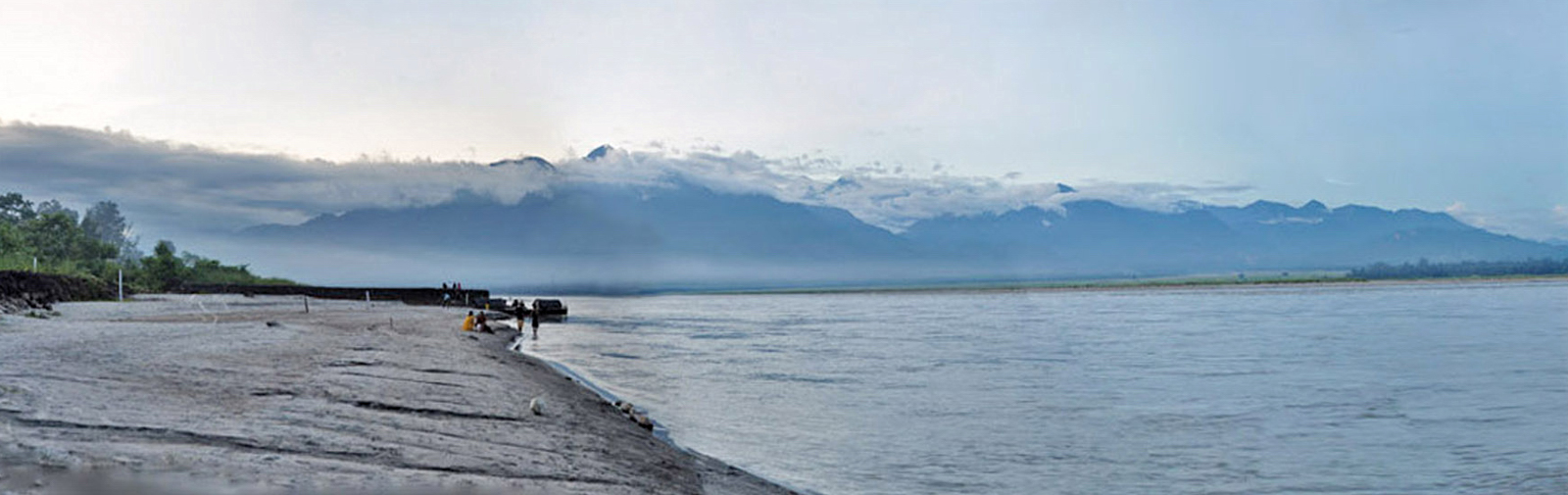
Siang river meeting the plains

Pasighat is the land of the Siang river and indigenous hanging bridges. A waterfall graces the mountain cliffs and chills the vicinity. Attractions in the town include:

- The Daying Ering Wildlife Sanctuary in Arunachal Pradesh, India is one of the most popular wildlife parks of the state. Spread over an area of 190 square kilometres (73 sq mi), alluvial grasslands form the major area and wooded areas constitute about 15%. The rest of the area is water. The present land of the sanctuary was mostly donated by the Mebo and Monngu Banngos. It is popularly called Jopong, which was a named given by locals and land owners in memory of Rutum Jotan Pertin during 1790s.
- Pangin is about 60 kilometres (37 mi) from Pasighat, and is connected by road. It stands at a point where River Siyom meets River Siang and the blue waters of Siyom meet the green Siang. There are rare plants and herbs which are of medicinal importance. Botanists and Zoologists can have ample scope for study of the rich plant and wildlife resources.
- Bodak Scenic Area: The Bodak-Mebo-Jengging Scenic Area is a popular picnic spot for tourists. The scenic area is a large forested area with villages, agricultural lands within, at about 15 kilometres away from the Pasighat main town. The scenic area is along the highway starting from the Siang Bridge and diverges to Mebo village on the right hand side and to Jengging village on the left hand side. The road to Jenning is much more frequented because of the vistas of the Siang river from the road. The area is also home to the Mïdu Lereng stone monolith. Villagers of the area have shown concern about the garbage generated and destruction to the environment from frequent tourist visits and many regular picnic spots are now taxed by NGOs who help maintain the environment.
- Kekar Monying: A mountain cliff near Rottung which is an important historical place because it was here that the Adi put up a strong resistance against the British in 1911. The war was a part of a punitive expedition undertaken by the British for murdering Noel Williamson, a political officer in the previous year by Matmur Jamoh, a native of Yagrung village.
- Komsing: A village on the left bank of the Siang is the place of Williamson's murder. A stone epitaph bearing the name of Noel Williamson lies near the Siang.
- Komlighat used to be a river port at an earlier time. The ghat marks the area of the colonial town of Pasighat which has been submerged into the Siang river following a flood and the river changing its course. The spot is also popular for its street food sold by vendors in the area. The ghat provides a wonderful view of the river and the hills surrounding the Pasighat plains. The distant hills are covered with snow in winters.
- Pasighat Buddhist Temple: Located in the opposite side of the air strip from the highway, this small temple serves as the only Buddhist worship place in Pasighat.
- East Siang District Museum: Also located in the opposite side of the Pasighat Airport, it is the district museum of the East Siang District.
- Adi Baane Kebang Headquarters: Pasighat also houses the headquarters of the Adi Baane Kebang, which acts as the de facto cultural parliament governing the cultural, linguistic, traditional aspects of the Adi people.
- Pasighat Airport is a military airstrip, which has been upgraded and is also being used as a civilian airport.
- Gomsi: A cultivation area near Rani Village is another place of historical importance. In June 1996, a team of archaeologists conducted a trial excavation and survey in the site. They found evidence of culture of early medieval period (probably Pre-Ahom).
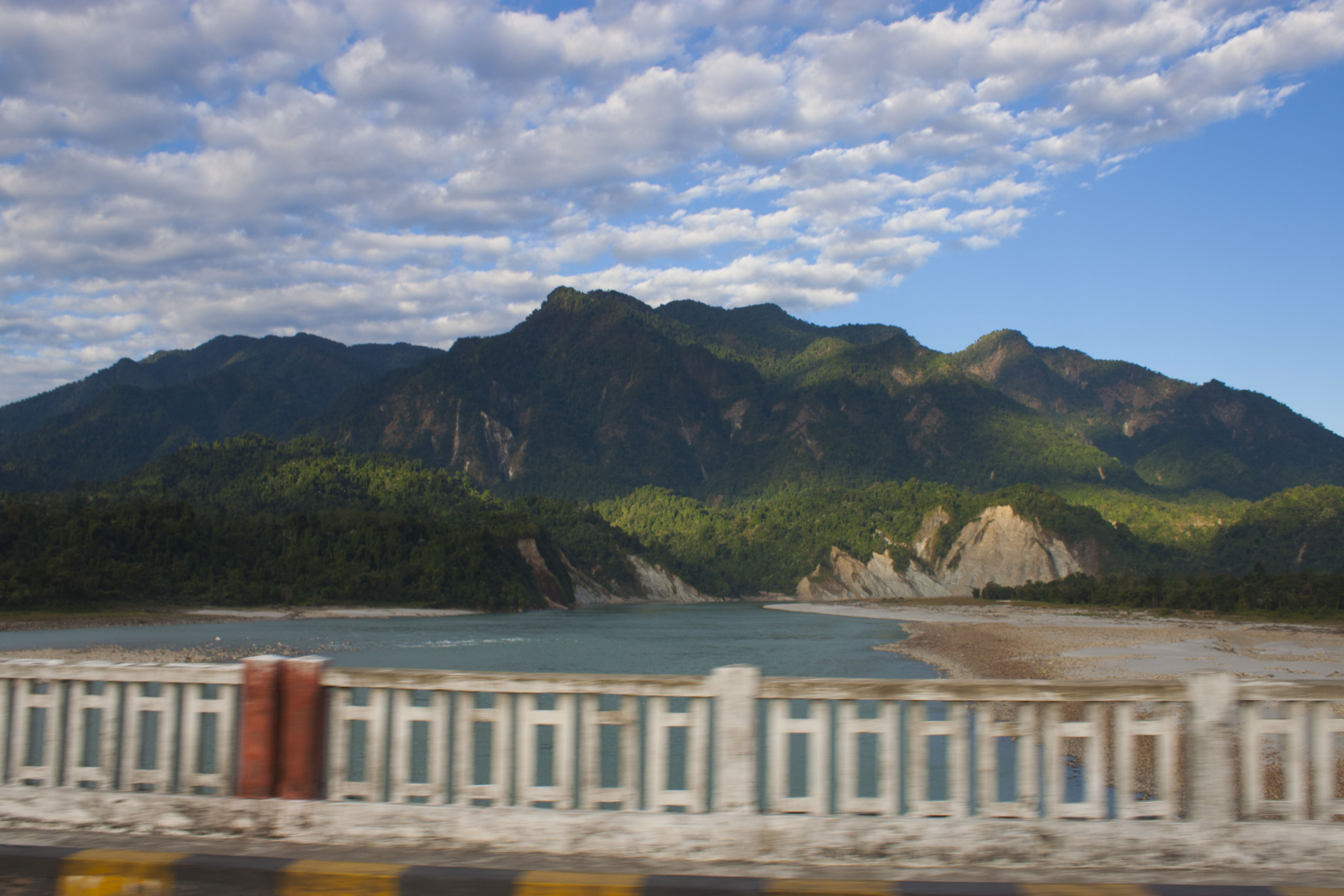
  River Siang (Brahmaputra) entering into the plains at Ranaghat, on the east of Pasighat

== See also ==
Military bases

- List of ALGs
- List of Indian Air Force stations
- India-China military deployment on LAC
- List of disputed India-China areas
- Ukdungle

Borders

- Line of Actual Control (LAC)
- Borders of China
- Borders of India

Other related topics

- India-China Border Roads
- List of extreme points of India
- Defence Institute of High Altitude Research
- Independent Golden Jubilee Government Higher Secondary School, Pasighat
