= Biyuram Wahge =

Indian politician

President of the Arunachal Pradesh Bharatiya Janata Party
- In office 17 January 2020 – 18 January 2025
- Preceded by: Tapir Gao
- Succeeded by: Kaling Moyong

Member of the Legislative Assembly for Arunachal Pradesh
- Incumbent
- Assumed office 24 December 2017
- Preceded by: Kameng Dolo
- Constituency: Pakke-Kessang

Personal details
- Born: 1965 (age 60–61) Seba village, East Kameng, Arunachal Pradesh, India
- Party: Bharatiya Janata Party

Biyuram Wahge (born 1965) is an Indian politician from Arunachal Pradesh. He is a member of the Bharatiya Janata Party and a former president of the state BJP. He is a member of the Arunachal Pradesh Legislative Assembly representing Pakke-Kessang constituency.

== Personal life ==
Wahge was born in 1965 to Tali Wahge in Seba village of East Kameng district, Arunachal Pradesh. He finished his schooling in two different towns, Seppa and Bomdila, and eventually settled at Seijosa, Pakke-Kessang district. His elder brother, Katung Wahge, is the Chief Engineer of the Western Zone of the Public Works Department, Government of Arunachal Pradesh.

== Political career ==
Wahge is a member of the Bharatiya Janata Party (BJP) and is active in the politics of Arunachal Pradesh. He embarked on a career in politics after joining the youth wing of the BJP, Bharatiya Janata Yuva Morcha (BJYM), in 2000 and held various positions in the organisation till 2008. He was the state general secretary of the BJYM from 2000 to 2003 and became its vice-president in 2003 and remained in this capacity till 2005. He became the president of the BJYM in 2005 and held this position till 2008 when he left the organisation for the parent body and became the treasurer of the latter. He was promoted to the rank of state general secretary of the BJP in 2014.

=== Member of the Legislative Assembly ===
In the 2017 Arunachal Pradesh Legislative Assembly by-election, Wahge was given a BJP ticket to contest the Pakke-Kessang Vidhan Sabha constituency. following the rejection of Indian National Congress politician and former Deputy Chief Minister of Arunachal Pradesh Kameng Dolo's plea by the Supreme court against a judgement of the Guwahati High Court declaring Dolo's election in the 2014 Arunachal Pradesh Legislative Assembly election void. Dolo also contested the by-election from the same constituency but lost against Wahge.

He was again entrusted by the party in Pakke-Kessang to contest the 2019 Arunachal Pradesh Legislative Assembly election. He defeated the Congress candidate Atum Welly by a margin of 2,222 votes. He donated his first salary as a member of the Arunachal Pradesh Legislative Assembly to the party's state unit fund, becoming the first legislator in the history of Arunachal Pradesh to do so. He was successfully re-elected in the 2024 Arunachal Pradesh Legislative Assembly election.

=== BJP Arunachal Pradesh president ===
Wahge was elected as the president of the Arunachal Pradesh BJP on 17 January 2020 at Itanagar, succeeding Tapir Gao. The election process was carried out under the supervision of the party's returning officer for the organisational elections in the state, Roding Pertin. He received the certification of his election to the position of party president by the National General Secretary of the BJP, Anil Jain, in the presence of the party's central election observer for the election of president in the state Vinod Sonkar, Education Minister Taba Tedir, Rural Works Department Minister Honchun Ngandam and other legislators and senior leaders of the state BJP.
