= GS2 =

GS2 may be a shorthand reference to:

== In technology ==
- Samsung Galaxy S II, smartphone
- Samsung Gear S2, smartwatch
- Blue Origin New Glenn stage 2, space launch rocket upper stage

== In video games ==
- Galactic Civilizations II
- Golden Sun: The Lost Age
- Phoenix Wright: Ace Attorney − Justice for All, known in Japan as Gytakuten Saiban 2

== Other uses ==
- GS-II (1,3-beta-glucan synthase), an enzyme

== See also ==
- GS (disambiguation)
- GSS (disambiguation)
