= Adi Baane Kebang Youth Wing =

- Type: Traditional Youth Apex
- Headquarters: Pasighat
- Location: East Siang District, Arunachal Pradesh
- Members: Adi people
- President: Oki Dai
- Vice President (Admin): Kaling Eko
- Vice President (Protocol): Nang Gao
- General Secretary: Anit Tamuk
- Website: www.abkyw.com
- As of November 2014

Adi Baane Kebang Youth Wing is the youth wing of the Adi Baane Kebang, which is a traditional apex of Adi people. Adi Baane Kebang Youth Wing (ABKYW) is a non-profitable, non-political and non-governmental youth organization working under the guidance of Adi Baane Kebang Apex Body. With the full initiatives of educated people at the other side, for saving customs & traditions, inspiring the youths of this generation & promoting the community around the world. Having similar aims and visions towards the Adi society, stepping forward and around the Adi belts.

ABKYW works at a foundational level, believing that changes from the bottom will bring effective, equitable, and sustainable results. ABKYW also works to empower young people by building their capacity to achieve greater independence, overcoming constraints against their participation and providing them with opportunities to make decisions that affect their lives and well being. ABKYW believes that empowering young people is the process of enhancing the capacity of individuals or a group to make choices and to transform those choices into desired actions and outcome. ABKYW wants active-social Adi Youths of Arunachal to join in this society for the upliftment of the community as a whole.

== Working ==
For the outshine and extraction of the hidden beauty of the Adi youth, ABKYW has organised the first-ever Miss Adi and launched the official website of Miss Adi “www.missadi.com” in a simple but impressive function held at C-Sector Naharlagun. ABK upholding the traditional entity of culturally rich Adi community besides fostering the mutual trust and communal harmony amongst different communities of the state. Arunachalees are united and take pride in their indigenous cultural heritage. This cultural mosaic is maintained, preserved and propagated by ABK at all costs while keeping the idea of unity in diversity. ABK will continue its commendable welfare –oriented initiatives in future.

ABKYW has also represented the Arunachal Pradesh in North East Festival, Delhi.

It had stroked controversy when it burned copies of newspapers and banned circulation of newspapers which was later resolved after an agreement was drawn between the youth organisation and journalists organisation.
