= Mebo =

Mebo may refer to:

- Mebo Telecommunications
- MV Mebo II, Dutch freighter
- Mebo, Arunachal Pradesh, Tehsil in Arunachal Pradesh, India
- MEBO, a β-Sitosterol burn ointment
