= Kerang (disambiguation) =

Kerang is a city in Victoria, Australia.

It may also refer to:

- Kerrang!, British rock and heavy metal magazine
- Kerang Village, a village in Arunachal Pradesh, India
- Kerang railway station, a railway station in the Piangil line in Victoria, Australia

== See also ==
- Bukit Kerang, an archaeological site of the Mesolithic era found in Indonesia
- KeRanger, a ransomware trojan horse, targeting computers running on macOS
- Kerangas forest, a type of tropical moist forest found in Borneo island and on Indonesian Belitung and Bangka islands west of Borneo
