= Independent Golden Jubilee Government Higher Secondary School, Pasighat =

IGJGHSS, Pasighat
- Pasighat, East Siang district, Arunachal Pradesh; India

Information
- School type: Government
- Motto: Come to learn, go to serve.
- Established: 1947
- Principal: Taloh Sir
- Teaching staff: ~56
- Enrolment: 1,760 (2014, Grades IX–XII)
- Campus: 3,189 acres
- Campus type: Suburban

Independent Golden Jubilee Government Higher Secondary School, Pasighat is the oldest school in the Indian state of Arunachal Pradesh. It is recognised by the CBSE, New Delhi, under the Government of Arunachal Pradesh and has three streams: Humanities, Commerce and Science.

== History ==
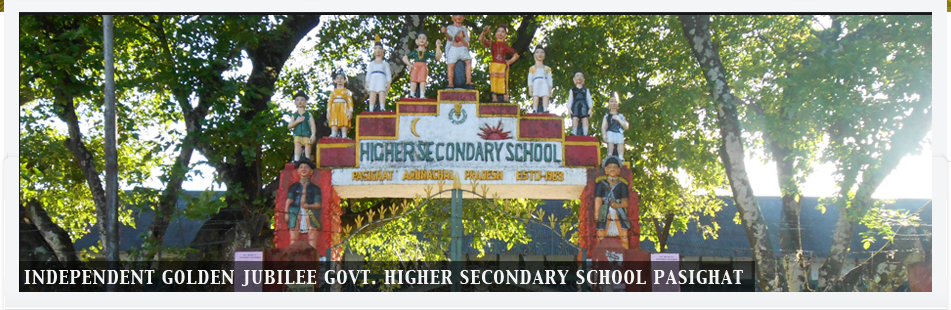
Entrance of IGJGHSS, Pasighat

Pasighat was established as a formal township in 1911. The then British Government of India refused to provide a school there, so the local people of Pasighat themselves opened a lower primary school on a self-help basis after the pattern of an ashram and engaged Sri Putiram Kaman as its teacher. The school had classes up to 3rd standard, after which students had to go to Sadiya Middle School, run by the American Baptist Mission. The British administration opened their own lower primary school in Paglek, now part of Pasighat, in 1918, but it closed after the Siang River flooded. Hence the present higher secondary School was established as a lower primary school in 1940. It was upgraded to a M. E. school in 1947, a secondary school in 1952, and finally a higher secondary school in 1963. In 1997, the golden jubilee of Indian independence, it was renamed Independence Golden Jubilee Government Higher Secondary School. In 1952, the first group of students from the school appearing for matriculation examinations numbered five; in 2014 its enrollment was around 1,760 in classes IX to XII.
