= Daying Ering =

Indian politician

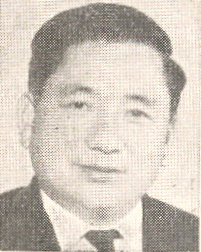
- Official portrait

Union Deputy Minister of Food, Agriculture, Community Development and Cooperation
- In office 18 March 1967 – 21 June 1970
- Prime Minister: Indira Gandhi
- Minister: Jagjivan Ram
- Minister of State: Annasaheb Shinde
- Preceded by: Annasaheb Shinde
- Succeeded by: Jagannath Pahadia

Parliamentary Secretary to the Minister of Home Affairs
- In office 15 February 1966 – 13 March 1967
- Prime Minister: Indira Gandhi
- Minister: Gulzarilal Nanda; Indira Gandhi; Yashwantrao Chavan

Member of Parliament, Lok Sabha
- In office 1962–21 June 1970
- Preceded by: Chao Khamoon Gohain
- Succeeded by: C. C. Gohain
- Constituency: Nominated

Chairman, Ering Commission
- In office 1964–1967
- President: Sarvepalli Radhakrishnan

Personal details
- Born: 11 December 1929 Runne, East Siang district, NEFA, British India
- Died: 21 June 1970 (aged 40) Shillong, India
- Party: NEFA Sangam
- Spouse: Odam Ering
- Children: Ninong Ering

Daying Ering (11 December 1929 – 21 June 1970) was an Indian politician from Arunachal Pradesh. He was the chairman of the Ering Commission which heavily influenced the country's panchayati raj system. He is often considered as the founding father of modern day Arunachal.

He was a Parliamentary Secretary in the Ministry of Home Affairs in First Indira Gandhi ministry from 15 February 1966 to 13 March 1967. He again served as Deputy Minister in the Ministry of Food, Agriculture, Community Development and Cooperation in Second Indira Gandhi ministry from 18 March 1967 to 21 June 1970.

== Biography ==
Ering was born in an Adi family in Runne village near Pasighat in 1929. He started his career in the Indian Frontier Administrative Service. Later, in 1963, he was nominated as a Member of the Lok Sabha from NEFA by the President of India. He was later appointed as the Parliament Secretary and a Deputy Minister in the Ministry of Food and Agriculture.

In 1964, he chaired the Ering Commission, an investigative body looking into governmental decentralization. The Commission's report, in 1965, recommended a four-tier system of local government, and heavily influenced the adoption of the Panchayati Raj system.

Ering died in Shillong, in 1970. At this time he was Deputy Minister for Agriculture. The Daying Ering Memorial Wild Life Sanctuary in the East Siang district is named after him. Other places and institutions and places named after him include the Daying Ering College of Teachers' Education, Daying Ering Memorial Middle School, Daying Ering Memorial Higher Secondary School Pasighat, Daying Ering Wildlife Foundation Eco-Development Society and Daying Ering Colony. After his death, C. C. Gohain was nominated as a Member of the Lok Sabha from NEFA by the President of India.
