= Crown Colony of Eastern Agency Scheme =

Crown Colony proposal of Northeast India and Western Burma

Districts proposed into the Crown Colony of Eastern Agency regarding Assam

Districts proposed for the Crown Colony of Eastern Agency Scheme

The Crown Colony of Eastern Agency also known as the Coupland Crown Colony Scheme was a proposal to create a British Crown Colony of the tribal areas of northeast India and western Burma in the 1930s and 1940s.

== Background ==
During the era of the British Raj, northeast India was politically and economically isolated from the Indian mainland. The Inner Line system was introduced to safeguard minority indigenous rights and identity in the hill areas of the Assam province. The hill areas of Assam were also classified as 'excluded' or 'partially excluded' areas where it was assumed that the tribal communities would not be able to catch up to the progress of the mainland.

== Development ==
The proposal for a separate province originated from Nevill Edward Parry. Parry had worked as Superintendent of the Lushai Hills and deputy commissioner of the Khasi and Garo Hills. Parry forwarded a memorandum to the Simon Commission in 1930 recommending a proposed scheme to safeguard the future of the tribal populations until they were ready to govern themselves. Parry further pointed out that the Lushai Hills (Mizoram) had no future industrially.

The scheme was supported by John Henry Hutton, the deputy commissioner of the Naga Hills and Peter Loren Seton James, the Political officer of the Abor Hills. Hutton argued the tribal hill peoples had no cultural, linguistic or historical relationship with Assam. The plan began to formulate as a "North Eastern Frontier Protectorate" consisting of the territories of:

- Khasi and Jaintia Hills (Meghalaya)
- Naga Hills (Nagaland)
- Lushai Hills (Mizoram)
- Tracts of Burma

The plan began to undergo consideration and discussion secretly among the colonial administration of Assam. Prominent actors include the two governors of Assam, Robert Neil Reid, Andrew Clow, and their respective advisors James Philip Mills and Phillip F. Adams. The purpose in their proposed plans were for the preservation of culture, languages and traditions and encourage self-administration of their villages.

Robert Reid produced the first formal proposal for the Crown Colony Scheme in 1941. Reid outlined the strategic importance of the northeast frontier with Tibet, China, Burma and Japan In his note, A Note on the Future of the Present Excluded, Partially Excluded and Tribal Areas of Assam, Reid drew from the developments of Parry and Hutton and described the Indo-Burmese border as "artificial as it was imperceptible". Reid expanded the scope of the territory to extend North East Frontier Agency and Chittagong Hill Tracts while also encouraging absorption of Burmese hill territories such as the Chin Hills and northern Shan States. The Kingdom of Manipur was also considered. Reid's estimation placed the proposed colony scheme at a population of 2.5 million. Reid argued it was feasible to carry out as the advisors of villages mete disputes and villages are generally self-sufficient and organise projects via collective unpaid labour.

The plan would draw funds from the imperial sources. It was also considerate of Burmese tribes to man the administrative institutions such as local army and police with Karens, Shans and Kachins. Reid's plan was forwarded to Lord Linlithgow and L. S. Amery the Secretary of State for India. Amery stated his view that, considering the creation of the state of Pakistan, there will be two Muslim areas, Hindu India and an important primitive hill tribe area.

It is argued that Amery's support for the Crown Colony Scheme centred around reserving excluded areas to the British Government similar to his attempts to keep the Indian Princely States out of the Indian Government's future.

Amery provided a copy of the plan to Professor Reginald Coupland, who published it in his third and final volume on the constitutional problem in India. Coupland stated in his work that the tribal areas were a "mongoloid block" that belonged neither to India or Burma. It would have been practical for defense purposes to cooperate with India and Burma with the British for the scheme to work. This thus gave the scheme the name the "Coupland plan" or "Coupland Crown Colony Scheme". Reid's successor, Andrew Clow, worked with J. P. Mills to update the plan and adjust it accordingly. Mills quoted the examples of Bechuanaland Protectorate and Swaziland in Africa to protect inhabitants from exploitation and further progress. However, during the discussion of the scheme, disagreements arose regarding whether the Burmese and Indian tribes should be fused into one administrative entity.

Governor Reginald Dorman-Smith of Burma discussed the scheme with his government while in exile from Japanese occupation. When the scheme was dismissed at the fourth meeting, Dorman-Smith continued discussions. He met with Mills the Assam Secretary. Dorman-Smith sent R. E. McGuire, Secretary of the Scheduled Areas Department of Burma, to meet with Mills and further discuss the plan. McGuire composed a memorandum and sent it to John Walton of the Burma office to advocate a separate administration for the hill tracts of Burma. McGuire suggested to begin with two agencies one Assam and one Burma before amalgamating them into one entity. Reid corroborated with McGuire's suggestions as it would be a convenient policy but insisted on unity of single systems of finance.

The Scheme was discussed at the India Office with Amery and Lord Wavell before he departed England to take the governorship of India. The details of the amalgamation reached a conclusion between Wavell, Dorman-Smith and Amery by late 1944. Wavell met with Dorman Smith in Shimla to discuss the tribal tracts in Burma, Assam and possibly Bengal. Dorman-Smith recommended forming a separate unit administered directly by the Governor-General or the Governor of Burma. However, Wavell later wrote to Amery that the tribal areas belonged to India and it would be difficult to separate them from a treaty arrangement in the Cripps Declaration. Amery corresponded that the territorial matter was of treaty arrangement, not constitutional provinces. Amery's advisor suggested the scheme should be funded by the British government in London and the treaty made by the UK and the provincial agency. Amery suggested instead that the British maintain a mandate-like system in the tribal tracts and, until the people have been consulted, be justifiably transferred to India. Internationally, a purely British occupation would be unjustifiable, so a multinational approach of shared development would be best, according to Amery, in terms of Indian relations. Wavell, however, differed with Amery, stating that he could not see the British Government's future in spending large sums and efforts for backwards tribes, nor the Indian Governments in the future willingly accepting British co-rule of the regions. Wavell raised a point that the political nature of the 1930s, in which the scheme was proposed, had changed drastically. To maintain control over the tribal tracts would be unpopularly seen by Indian nationalists as limiting Indian constitutionalism. Wavell stated to Amery in December 1944, the reorganisation of the regions under British or international body rule seemed impracticable.

The plan was supported by Northeastern communities. In the Khasi and Jaintia Hills and the Lushai Hills saw particular support for the scheme. Many hill leaders feared the Indian rule will subvert their best interests than remaining under the British. The Nagas who had been granted the Naga Hills District Tribal Council in 1945 by Deputy Commissioner Sir Charles Ridley asked to remain within the British Crown with their legislative council.

McGuire and Mills held a meeting with Caroe, Wavells' Secretary of External Department, about the possible readjustment of the Assam-Burma frontier and coordination or amalgamation possibilities. The meeting was informal with no commitments of either Assam or Burma being made. McGuire reiterated his stance of a double administration of Assam and Burma instead. Clow's vision within Assam preferred a merger of the tribal territories into Assam than becoming its own entity. The India Office recorded on their minute that the aim was to prepare the tribal tracts into a Federal Union with India rather than have a British Indian policy impeding such goals. Inspired by the Chief Commissioner system of Baluchistan which had a similar issue of tribal regions and frontier status inspired the case for Assam. However, an official of the India office rebuked this stating that while it could be done it should be done in a proposed treaty with India and that the proposals for a separate territory had come too late.

This alternate Chief Commissioner proposal only concerned Assam and ignored the scope of Burmese provinces. By April 1945, Burma was liberated from Japanese occupation and the administration committed to the trusteeship of the British Government for the welfare of the Burma Scheduled Areas and the need of protecting themin development towards self-government. In May the British issued a white paper stating the policy aimed at a voluntary inclusion of tribal people into the structure of Burma. It was done so on the basis that it was not the right time to include all peoples under Burma. Furthermore, the rise of Burmese nationalism in the Japanese resistance made the idea of territorial carving difficult for British officials.

== Decline ==
After the defeat of Winston Churchill's government, Amery was removed from office. This prompted Dorman-Smith to abandon the scheme as he felt it took away the priorities of frontier administration. Some historians argue the scheme was approved by Churchill but vetoed by Clement Attlee's government. Amery's successor, Frederick Pethick-Lawrence, concurred with Wavell's views on the impracticability of the scheme. Indian opinion of the scheme was also unpopular especially considering a co-rule structure would require Indian funds to pay for a region they had no direct control of.

Andrew Clow released a memorandum in 1945 titled "Memorandum on the Future Government of Assam Tribal People". The memorandum discussed the demolition of the proposed schemes by citing that the time was not right for such a development. Clow stated that political difficulties would plague the territory formed. Furthermore, there would be economic issues as they were a landlocked country likely to be ignored by both Burma and India and possibly intensify the already primitive economy. There would be a lack of cohesion over the bizarre and difficult geography. Administratively, there would be difficulty securing skilled officers and cadres.

"It seems most unlikely that a British Government which is prepared to set India and Burma on a self-governing footing should now undertake the administrative and financial responsibility for a pawtchwork of sparsely populated hills lying where these hills do. Indian opinion would be equally strongly opposed to the constitution of a foreign territory in its natural borders".

— Andrew Clow, Memorandum on the Future Government of Assam Tribal People

Clow further stated the development of Pakistan's territorial claims were a reason to factor in the decline. The unrestricted immigration from Bengal began to be seen as an attempt to turn Assam into a muslim majority province to incorporate it into East Pakistan. Clow states that the tribal areas which were part of Assam essentially balanced out the religious demographics.

Reginald Dorman-Smith, the second governor of Burma, also opposed the scheme, citing that "nothing but trouble ahead" would occur in Burma if they attempted to pursue the separate Agency scheme, and for the matter to be officially closed. On 6 May 1946, the Secretary of State for India, in a "Minutes on Backward Track", declared that it had become impracticable to transfer responsibility of the backwards track to any outside authority, whether British or a UN mandate.

Other reasons for its decline have been argued due to the influence of the creation of the State of Pakistan, in which the British realised it was bad timing to carve out a protectorate of its own. Many hill leaders began to cooperate with the Indian government in due time as well. Nehru reached out to Reverend James Joy Mohan Nichols Roy from the Khasi and Jaintia Hills and convinced him to join India. In the Lushai Hills, the Mizo Union opposed the proposal because they opposed the institution of Mizo chieftainship which they had come to see an anachronistic. A crown colony scheme would only continue the institution. The Naga Hills were convinced to join India under the promise of autonomy. The Naga National Council passed a resolution in June 1946 demanding autonomy and opposing the Crown Colony Scheme. Both Clow and Hydari negotiated with the Nagas with considerable success.

== Sources ==
- Arya, Shailender (2020). "The Crown Colony That Never Was" (PDF). Journal of United Service Instititon of India. 150 (619): 118–129.
- Chan, Chai-Fong (2001). "British Colonial Policy on Frontier Areas Adjoining Assam and Burma: With Special References to the Crown Colony Scheme". Journal of the Japanese Association for South Asian Studies. 2001 (13): 76–106.
