= 2024 Indian general election in Arunachal Pradesh =

Election to elect members of the 18th Lok Sabha in Arunachal Pradesh

- 19 April 2024

All 2 Arunachal Pradesh seats in the Lok Sabha
- Opinion polls
- Turnout: 77.51% (▼4.6%)
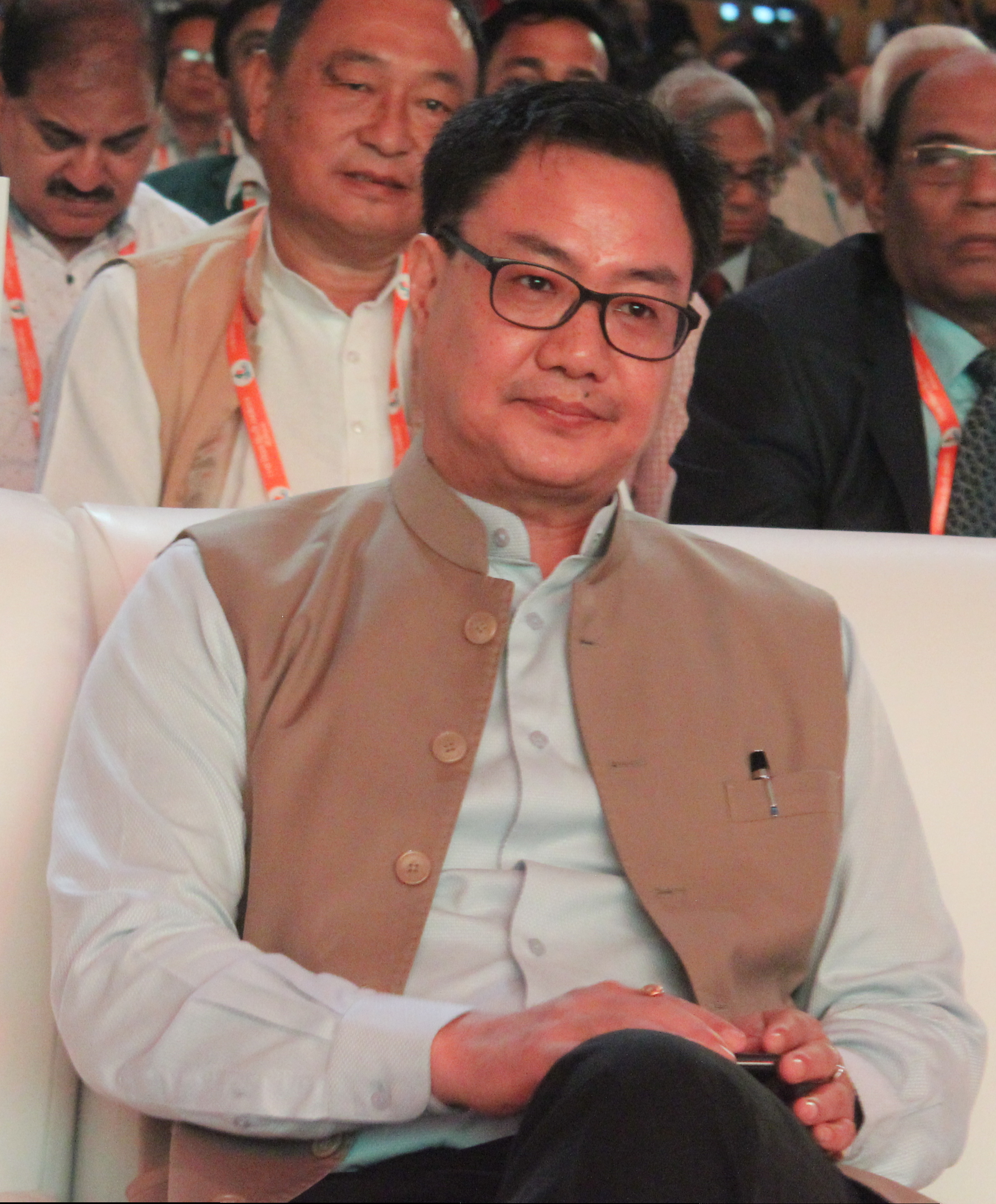

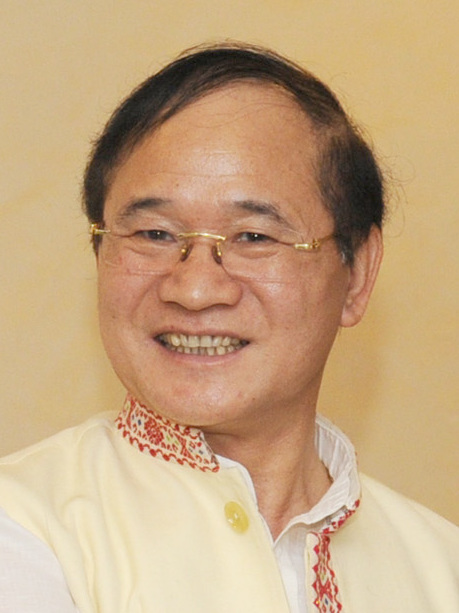
| | First party | Second party |
|---|---|---|
| Leader | Kiren Rijiju | Nabam Tuki |
| Party | BJP | INC |
| Alliance | NDA | INDIA |
| Leader since | 2021 | 2019 |
| Leader's seat | Arunachal West | Arunachal West (lost) |
| Last election | 58.2%, 2 seats | 20.69%, 0 seat |
| Seats won | 2 | 0 |
| Seat change | Steady | Steady |
| Popular vote | 350,998 | 219,839 |
| Percentage | 50.61% | 31.70% |
| Swing | ▼7.59% | ▲11.01% |
- Seatwise Result Map of the 2024 general election in Arunachal Pradesh
Prime Minister before election
Narendra Modi
BJP
Prime Minister after election
Narendra Modi
BJP

The 2024 Indian general election was held in Arunachal Pradesh on 19 April 2024 to elect two members of the 18th Lok Sabha. Legislative assembly election was held simultaneously with the general election.

== Election schedule ==
On 16th March 2024, the Election Commission of India announced the schedule for the 2024 Indian general election, with Arunachal Pradesh scheduled to vote during the first phase on the 19 of April.

| Poll event | Phase |
|---|---|
| Poll event | I |
| Notification date | 20 March |
| Last date for filing nomination | 27 March |
| Scrutiny of nomination | 28 March |
| Last Date for withdrawal of nomination | 30 March |
| Date of poll | 19 April |
| Date of counting of votes/Result | 4 June 2024 |
| No. of constituencies | 2 |

== Parties and alliances ==
=== National Democratic Alliance ===
National Democratic Alliance

| Party | Flag | Symbol | Leader | Seats contested |
|---|---|---|---|---|
| Bharatiya Janata Party | | | Kiren Rijiju | 2 |

=== Indian National Developmental Inclusive Alliance ===
Indian National Developmental Inclusive Alliance

| Party | Flag | Symbol | Leader | Seats contested |
|---|---|---|---|---|
| Indian National Congress | | | Nabam Tuki | 2 |

=== Others ===
| Party | Symbol | Seats contested |
|---|---|---|
| Gana Suraksha Party | | 1 |
| Arunachal Democratic Party | | 1 |
| Total | | 2 |

== Candidates ==
| Constituency | | NDA | | INDIA | |
| No. | Name | Party | Candidate | Party | Candidate |
|---|---|---|---|---|---|
| 1 | Arunachal West | BJP | Kiren Rijiju | INC | Nabam Tuki |
| 2 | Arunachal East | BJP | Tapir Gao | INC | Bosiram Siram |

== Surveys and polls ==
=== Opinion polls ===
| Polling agency | Date published | Margin of error | | | | Lead |
| Polling agency | Date published | Margin of error | NDA | INDIA | Others | Lead |
| ABP News-CVoter | April 2024 | ±5% | 2 | 0 | 0 | NDA |
| ABP News-CVoter | March 2024 | ±5% | 2 | 0 | 0 | NDA |
| Times Now-ETG | December 2023 | ±3% | 2 | 0 | 0 | NDA |
| India TV-CNX | October 2023 | ±3% | 2 | 0 | 0 | NDA |
| Times Now-ETG | September 2023 | ±3% | 2 | 0 | 0 | NDA |
| Times Now-ETG | August 2023 | ±3% | 2 | 0 | 0 | NDA |

| Polling agency | Date published | Margin of error | | | | Lead |
| Polling agency | Date published | Margin of error | NDA | INDIA | Others | Lead |
| ABP News-CVoter | April 2024 | ±5% | 63% | 32% | 5% | 31 |
| ABP News-CVoter | March 2024 | ±5% | 61% | 32% | 7% | 29 |

=== Exit polls ===
| Polling agency | | | | Lead |
| Polling agency | NDA | INDIA | Others | Lead |
| India Today Axis My India | 2 | 0 | 0 | NDA |
| Pratik - Classification | 1 | 1 | 0 | TIED |
| Actual results | 2 | 0 | 0 | NDA |

== Results ==
=== Results by alliance or party ===
| Party/Alliance | | Popular vote | | | Seats | | |
| Party/Alliance | | Votes | % | ±pp | Contested | Won | +/− |
|---|---|---|---|---|---|---|---|
| NDA | BJP | 350,998 | 50.61 | ▼7.59 | 2 | 2 | Steady |
| INDIA | INC | 219,839 | 31.70 | ▲11.01 | 2 | 0 | Steady |
| Others | | 37,152 | 5.36 | | 2 | 0 | Steady |
| IND | | 71,070 | 11.30 | | 8 | 0 | Steady |
| NOTA | | 7,191 | 1.03 | | | | |
| Total | | | 100 | - | 14 | 2 | - |

=== Results by constituency ===
| Constituency | | Turnout | Winner | | | | | Runner-up | | | | | Margin | |
| Constituency | | Turnout | Party | Alliance | Candidate | Votes | % | Party | Alliance | Candidate | Votes | % | Votes | % |
|---|---|---|---|---|---|---|---|---|---|---|---|---|---|---|
| 1 | Arunachal West | 73.60%▼ | BJP | NDA | Kiren Rijiju | 2,05,417 | 51.38% | INC | INDIA | Nabam Tuki | 1,04,679 | 26.18% | 1,00,738 | 25.20% |
| 2 | Arunachal East | 83.31%▼ | BJP | NDA | Tapir Gao | 1,45,581 | 45.01% | INC | INDIA | Bosiram Siram | 1,15,160 | 35.6% | 30,421 | 9.41% |

== Assembly segments-wise lead of parties ==
| Party | Assembly segments | Position in Assembly (as of 2024 simultaneous elections) |
|---|---|---|
| Bharatiya Janata Party | 44 | 46 |
| Indian National Congress | 16 | 1 |
| National People's Party | - | 5 |
| Nationalist Congress Party | - | 3 |
| People's Party of Arunachal | - | 2 |
| Independent | - | 3 |
| Total | 60 | |

== See also ==
- 2024 Indian general election in Assam
- 2024 Indian general election in Bihar
- 2024 Indian general election in Chandigarh
