= Government Secondary School =

Government Secondary School may refer to:

India

- Government Secondary School, Bidsar
- Government Secondary School, Rani

Nigeria

- Government Secondary School, Afikpo
- Government Secondary School, Eneka
- Government Secondary School, Owerri
- Government Secondary School Usha Kadu

Sierra Leone

- Government Secondary School for Boys
