= GSS =

GSS may refer to:

== Education ==
- Garibaldi Secondary School, in Maple Ridge, British Columbia, Canada
- Government Secondary School (disambiguation)
- Greenridge Secondary School, in Singapore
- Grimsby Secondary School, in Ontario, Canada
- GSS Institute of Technology, in Bangalore, India
- Gay Student Services, now GLBT Aggies, at Texas A&M University

== Government and politics ==
- General Security Service (Syria)
- Global Standards Symposium
- Civic Alliance of Serbia (Serbian: Građanski Savez Srbije), a political party in Serbia
- Government Statistical Service, of the Government of the United Kingdom
- Israeli General Security Service, also known as Shin Bet
- Ghana Statistical Service, of the Government of Ghana

== Science ==
- General Social Survey
- Genome survey sequence
- Gerstmann–Sträussler–Scheinker syndrome
- Glutathione synthetase, an enzyme encoded by the gene GSS
- Granulomatous slack skin
- Gudjonsson Suggestibility Scale

== Sport ==
- Grønlands Seminarius Sportklub, a Greenlandic sport club
- Gurpreet Singh Sandhu, an Indian footballer
- Panionios G.S.S., a Greek association football club

== Technology ==
- Generic Security Services Application Program Interface, an application programming interface for programs to access security services
- Graph Style Sheets
- Graph-structured stack
- Galileo Sensor Station, in satellite navigation

== Other uses ==
- Croatian Mountain Rescue Service (Croatian: Gorska Služba Spašavanja)
- Ghost Shadows, a Chinese-American gang
- Global Supply Systems, a British cargo airline
- Good Samaritan Society, a Canadian Lutheran service organization
- Great Singapore Sale, an annual shopping event in Singapore
- Greek Sign Language
- Grupo Silvio Santos, a Brazilian holding company
- Guild of Servants of the Sanctuary, in the Church of England
