= Reginald Coupland =

British historian

Sir Reginald Coupland KCMG CIE FBA (2 August 1884 – 6 November 1952) was an English historian of the British Empire. Between 1920 and 1948, he held the Beit Professorship of Colonial History at the University of Oxford.

Coupland is known for his scholarship on African history, as a member of the 1923–1924 Royal Commission on the Superior Civil Services in India, and as an influential member of the 1936–1937 Peel Commission, a royal commission on Mandatory Palestine. He was elected a Fellow of the British Academy in 1948.

== Life ==
He was the son of Sidney Coupland, a physician at Middlesex Hospital, and his wife Bessie Potter, daughter of Thomas Potter of Great Bedwin, born in London. He was educated at Winchester College, and went on New College, Oxford, where he was taught by Alfred Zimmern, among others. He graduated in 1907, with a first class in Greats. That year he was elected a Fellow at Trinity College where he lectured in ancient history.

Under the influence of Lionel Curtis, Beit lecturer in colonial history 1912–1913, Coupland joined the Round Table movement, and succeeded Curtis as Beit lecturer. He became Beit Professor in 1920, succeeding Hugh Edward Egerton, despite his not having produced any finished work in print. In 1923 Coupland was appointed a member of a Royal Commission on the Superior Civil Services in India, for which service he was appointed a Companion of the Order of the Indian Empire (CIE) in the 1928 Birthday Honours.

With Curtis, Coupland tried to set up an African institution in Rhodes House in the early 1930s; but they were unsuccessful in obtaining funding. From 1938 to 1943 Coupland assisted Lord Lugard and Hanns Vischer with the running of the International African Institute. From 1939 to 1950 he was a fellow of Nuffield College, Oxford.

Coupland took part in the Cripps Mission of 1942 to Indian leaders. His diary of 1941–1942 is a significant source for the activities and thinking of Sir Stafford Cripps. It also discusses the Indian political groups. He was closely involved with Graham Spry in contradicting the account published by Louis Fischer in The Nation of political undertakings given by Cripps to Abul Kalam Azad, Mahatma Gandhi and Jawaharlal Nehru.

In the 1944 Birthday Honours Coupland was appointed a Knight Commander of the Order of St Michael and St George. He retired from the Beit Chair in 1948, which went to Vincent Harlow. He became a Fellow of All Souls' College, Oxford in 1952, dying later that year in Southampton, bound for South Africa. He never married.

== Reputation and legacy ==
According to historian Caroline Elkins, Coupland's work on British imperial history had a Whig narrative of progress. Coupland defended British Empire in India, arguing that there had been "no indubitably black years in the long record of the British connection with India".

Coupland wrote about abolitionism in his books Wilberforce and The British Anti-slavery Movement. Trinidadian historian and politician Eric Williams objected to Coupland's account of the Slavery Abolition Act 1833, which Williams perceived as being covertly supportive of continued British colonial rule in the West Indies. Coupland was one of the examiners of the 1938 Oxford D.Phil. dissertation by Williams written under Victor Harlow, on a topic suggested by C. L. R. James. It was "deferential" in comparison with the 1944 published version, the book Capitalism and Slavery, which relied on economic reasoning going back to Lowell Joseph Ragatz, to whom it was dedicated. Williams made a number of points directly criticising Coupland in Capitalism and Slavery, including:

- From the "Conclusion": "But historians, writing a hundred years after, have no excuse for continuing to wrap the real interests in confusion." Footnoted as: "Of this deplorable tendency Professor Coupland of Oxford University is a notable example."
- "Professor Coupland contends that behind the legal judgement lay the moral judgement, and that the Somersett case was the beginning of the end of slavery throughout the British Empire. This is merely poetic sentimentality translated into modern history."

The Oxford History of the British Empire considers that Coupland had a "distinguished career", but that the attack by Williams "clouded" its later part.

== Works ==
Coupland published:

- The War Speeches of William Pitt the Younger (1915)
- Wilberforce a narrative. Oxford: Clarendon Press. 1923 – via Internet Archive.
- The Quebec Act (1925)
- Raffles (1926)
- Kirk on the Zambesi (1928)
- The American Revolution and the British Empire (1930)
- The British Anti-slavery Movement (1933)
- East Africa and its Invaders (1938)
- The Exploitation of East Africa (1939)
- The Cripps Mission (1942)
- The Indian Problem, 1833–1935 (1942)
- Indian Politics, 1936–1942 (1943)
- The Future of India (1943)
- Livingstone's Last Journey (1945)
- India: a Re-Statement (1945)
- Welsh and Scottish Nationalism (posthumous, 1954)

== See also ==
- John Andrew Gallagher
- Ronald Robinson
- Coupland Crown Colony Scheme
- Peter Loren Seton James
