= Kaling Moyong =

Indian politician

Kaling Moyong President of BJP Arunachal Pradesh and MLA of 38 Pasighat East (Arunachal Pradesh) Constituency

President of the Arunachal Pradesh Bharatiya Janata Party
- Incumbent
- Assumed office 18 January 2025
- President: JP Nadda; Nitin Nabin
- Preceded by: Tapir Gao

Member of the Arunachal Pradesh Legislative Assembly
- In office 2014–2024
- Succeeded by: Tapi Darang
- Constituency: Pasighat East

Personal details
- Party: BJP
- Occupation: Public Leader

Kaling Moyong is an Indian politician who was the Member of Legislative Assembly of BJP in Arunachal Pradesh. He serves as the current president of the Arunachal Pradesh BJP. He was elected from the Pasighat East constituency in the 2014 Arunachal Pradesh Legislative Assembly election, defeating former Education Minister of Arunachal Pradesh Bosiram Siram.

== Career ==
Moyong is a former member of the Arunachal Pradesh Legislative Assembly, serving from 2014 to 2024, when he was defeated by Tapi Darang of the National People's Party. Currently, he is serving as the president of the Arunachal Pradesh BJP, since January 2025.
