= Chow Chandret Gohain =

Indian politician

Chow Chandret Gohain (b. Chowkham, Lohit district, NEFA in 1931, died 16 Feb 2014) was an Indian politician from Arunachal Pradesh in India. He was nominated a Member of the Lok Sabha from the then North-East Frontier Agency by the President of India in 1971. Earlier, he was a nominated member of the 4th Lok Sabha from NEFA in 1970, after the death of Daying Ering.

== Personal life ==
Gohain was born to Chow Kanan Gohain and was an agriculturist and a social worker by profession. He was the Chief Commissioner for Boy Scouts and Girls Guides of the NEFA Branch. He was a member of the Social Welfare Advisory Board of NEFA. Also, Gohain was Lohit Bodhi Society and Khampti Council's Secretary and was the Chairman of the Tribal Welfare Timber Board and NEFA Sangam.

He died on 17 Feb 2014 and was survived by his wife, Naug Sumecha, four sons, and a daughter.

His elder brother Chow Khamoon Gohain was the first MP of Arunachal.
