= Sidney Coupland =

Sidney Coupland FRCP (3 December 1849 – 29 April 1930, in Boars Hill near Oxford) was an English physician, specializing in pathological anatomy.

== Life ==
He was the son of William Newton Coupland, a merchant of Streatham. After education at Hove House School, Brighton, Sidney Coupland became a medical student at University College, London, where he qualified M.R.C.S. in 1871 and then held residency posts. At Middlesex Hospital, he became in 1873 pathologist, in 1875 assistant physician, in 1879 full physician, and in 1891 dean of the medical school. After serving as a full physician from 1879 to 1898 at Middlesex Hospital, he resigned to become one of the eleven Commissioners in Lunacy and served in that capacity from 1898 to 1914, and then from 1914 to 1921 as a member of the Board of Control for Lunacy and Mental Deficiency. He retired in 1921.

Coupland received his higher medical doctorate M.D.Lond. in 1874 and was elected F.R.C.P. in 1880. Perhaps his most important publications were the 6 reports, published from 1889 to 1896, on smallpox outbreaks; the reports were prepared for the 1889 Royal Commission on Vaccination.

Although a sound lecturer, especially interested in morbid anatomy and the use of clinical instruments, he was handicapped by an excessive shyness, which manifested itself in nervous titters. Bland-Sutton aptly described him as " conscientious as a teacher . . . highly self-conscious as a physician ". The nickname "Kidney Soupland" clung to him after his brilliant diagnosis, in 1880, of a renal calculus in a young woman had led to the first nephrolithotomy at the Middlesex Hospital.

Coupland delivered the Goulstonian Lectures (Anaemia) in 1881 and the Harveian Oration (Observations on the Statistics in Regard to Mental Disorders and their Occurrence) in 1915.

In 1880 in Bath, Somerset, he married Bessie Potter. Their only surviving son was Reginald Coupland, who became a professor of history at the University of Oxford.

== Selected publications ==
- Personal appearance in health and disease. 1879.
- Notes on the clinical examination of the blood and excreta. 1892.
- Allchin, W. H., ed. (1900). "Diseases of the Blood by Sidney Coupland". A Manual of Medicine. Vol. II. pp. 297–376.
- The Harveian Oration delivered before the Royal College of Physicians of London, on October 18th, 1915. London. 1915.
