= Pasighat West Assembly constituency =

Legislative Assembly constituency in Arunachal Pradesh, India

Coordinates: 28.062°N 95.305°E

Pasighat West
- Constituency No. 37 for the Arunachal Pradesh Legislative Assembly

Constituency details
- Country: India
- Region: Northeast India
- State: Arunachal Pradesh
- District: East Siang
- Lok Sabha constituency: Arunachal East
- Established: 1990
- Total electors: 14,637
- Reservation: ST

Member of Legislative Assembly
- 11th Arunachal Pradesh Legislative Assembly
- Incumbent Ninong Ering
- Party: Bharatiya Janata Party
- Elected year: 2024

Pasighat West is one of the 60 constituencies of the Arunachal Pradesh Legislative Assembly in India. East Siang is the name of the district that contains Tehsil Pasighat West. It is surrounded by Pangin Tehsil towards west, Bilat Tehsil towards south, Koyu Tehsil towards west. Tinsukia, Dibrugarh and Silapathar are the nearby cities to Pasighat.

== Members of the Legislative Assembly ==
Election	Member	Party
1990	Tarung Pabin	Indian National Congress
1995	Yadap Apang	Indian National Congress
1999	Dr. Tangor Tapak	Indian National Congress
2004	Omak Apang	Indian National Congress
2009	Dr. Tangor Tapak	Bharatiya Janata Party
2014	Tatung Jamoh	Indian National Congress
2019	Ninong Ering	Indian National Congress
2024	Ninong Ering	Bharatiya Janata Party

== Election results ==
=== Assembly Election 2024 ===
2024 Arunachal Pradesh Legislative Assembly election : Pasighat West
Party	Candidate	Votes	%	±%
BJP	Ninong Ering	8,049	59.50%	▲21.20
NCP	Tapyam Pada	5,178	38.28%	New
Arunachal Democratic Party	Kalen Taying	153	1.13%	New
Independent	Taka Muang	91	0.67%	New
NOTA	None of the Above	56	0.41%	▼0.02
Margin of victory		2,871	21.22%	▲16.51
Turnout		13,527	92.42%	▲1.50
Registered electors		14,637		▲9.87
BJP gain from INC		Swing	▲16.49	

=== Assembly Election 2019 ===
2019 Arunachal Pradesh Legislative Assembly election : Pasighat West
Party	Candidate	Votes	%	±%
INC	Ninong Ering	5,210	43.02%	▼10.34
BJP	Tatung Jamoh	4,639	38.30%	▼7.09
JD(S)	Tapang Taloh	2,210	18.25%	New
NOTA	None of the Above	53	0.44%	▼0.82
Margin of victory		571	4.71%	▼3.25
Turnout		12,112	90.92%	▲6.56
Registered electors		13,322		▲7.28
INC hold		Swing	▼10.34	

=== Assembly Election 2014 ===
2014 Arunachal Pradesh Legislative Assembly election : Pasighat West
Party	Candidate	Votes	%	±%
INC	Tatung Jamoh	5,589	53.35%	▲6.53
BJP	Dr. Tangor Tapak	4,755	45.39%	▼7.79
NOTA	None of the Above	132	1.26%	New
Margin of victory		834	7.96%	▲1.60
Turnout		10,476	84.36%	▲0.51
Registered electors		12,418		▲0.15
INC gain from BJP		Swing		

=== Assembly Election 2009 ===
2009 Arunachal Pradesh Legislative Assembly election : Pasighat West
Party	Candidate	Votes	%	±%
BJP	Dr. Tangor Tapak	5,529	53.18%	▲10.45
INC	Omak Apang	4,868	46.82%	▼10.45
Margin of victory		661	6.36%	▼8.19
Turnout		10,397	83.85%	▲0.55
Registered electors		12,399		▲20.87
BJP gain from INC		Swing		

=== Assembly Election 2004 ===
2004 Arunachal Pradesh Legislative Assembly election : Pasighat West
Party	Candidate	Votes	%	±%
INC	Omak Apang	4,894	57.27%	▲8.43
BJP	Dr. Tangor Tapak	3,651	42.73%	▲21.40
Margin of victory		1,243	14.55%	▼4.46
Turnout		8,545	82.00%	▲11.01
Registered electors		10,258		▼3.64
INC hold		Swing		

=== Assembly Election 1999 ===
1999 Arunachal Pradesh Legislative Assembly election : Pasighat West
Party	Candidate	Votes	%	±%
INC	Dr. Tangor Tapak	3,759	48.84%	▼2.54
AC	Yadap Apang	2,296	29.83%	New
BJP	Tamat Jonnom	1,641	21.32%	New
Margin of victory		1,463	19.01%	▲15.26
Turnout		7,696	74.17%	▼15.45
Registered electors		10,646		▲15.25
INC hold		Swing		

=== Assembly Election 1995 ===
1995 Arunachal Pradesh Legislative Assembly election : Pasighat West
Party	Candidate	Votes	%	±%
INC	Yadap Apang	4,165	51.39%	▼1.91
Independent	Tatong Padung	3,861	47.64%	New
Independent	Tapang Darang	79	0.97%	New
Margin of victory		304	3.75%	▼2.85
Turnout		8,105	88.33%	▲5.40
Registered electors		9,237		▲28.83
INC hold		Swing		

=== Assembly Election 1990 ===
1990 Arunachal Pradesh Legislative Assembly election : Pasighat West
Party	Candidate	Votes	%	±%
INC	Tarung Pabin	3,147	53.30%	New
JD	Tatong Padung	2,757	46.70%	New
Margin of victory		390	6.61%	
Turnout		5,904	83.17%	
Registered electors		7,170		
INC win (new seat)				

== See also ==
- List of constituencies of Arunachal Pradesh Legislative Assembly
- Arunachal Pradesh Legislative Assembly
