= Omem Moyong Deori =

Indian politician

Padma Shri Omem Moyong Deori
- Born: 2 July 1943
- Died: 19 December 2007 (aged 64)

Omem Moyong Deori (2 July 1943 – 19 December 2007) was an Indian politician from Arunachal Pradesh belonging to Indian National Congress. She was a member of the influential All India Congress Committee (AICC) for many years. Considered one of the most powerful northeastern leaders in the Indian National Congress, she served as President of Arunachal Pradesh Congress Committee. Deori was believed to have had very close relations with Indira Gandhi.

She was also elected Member of Rajya Sabha for the term, 27 May 1984 to 19 March 1990 from Arunachal Pradesh. In 1984, Omem Deori was conferred upon the honour of Padma Shri award for social service.

== Personal life ==
She was married to T. S. Deori and had two daughters and three sons.

== Death ==
Deori died on 19 December 2007 due to illness. The state of Arunachal Pradesh declared a mourning holiday to commemorate her death.
