= Bosiram Siram =

Indian politician

President Arunachal Pradesh Congress Committee
- Incumbent
- Assumed office 18 June 2025
- Preceded by: Nabam Tuki

Education Minister of Arunachal Pradesh

Member of the Arunachal Pradesh Legislative Assembly
- In office May 2009 – May 2014
- Preceded by: Ninnong Ering
- Succeeded by: Kaling Moyong
- Constituency: Pasighat East

Personal details
- Party: INC
- Spouse: Mary Ering
- Education: Jawaharlal Nehru College, pasighat
- Occupation: Public Leader
- Profession: politician

Bosiram Siram is an Indian Politician of Indian National Congress. He was elected as the Member of Legislative Assembly of 38-Pasighat East (ST) Constituency in the year 2009 and has since been promoted as the Education Minister of Arunachal Pradesh. During his tenure he mainly acted on the electricity and water supply issues, which were major concern among the people of his constituency. He was then defeated by Kaling Moyong during the 2014 elections by just 44 votes.

He was appointed as president of the Arunachal Pradesh Congress Committee (APCC) on 18 June 2025.
