= Mebo, Arunachal Pradesh =

Mebo is located 30 km (19 mi) towards East from District headquarters Pasighat. It is 243 km (151 mi) from the state capital of Itanagar towards West. It is part of Mebo constituency in the Arunachal Pradesh Legislative Assembly and is represented by Lombo Tayeng.

== Geography ==
Mebo is part of the Mebo Adc subdivision, which encompasses an area of 571.71 square kilometers. The subdivision comprises 10 villages, contributing to a rural population of 7,015 as per the 2011 Census. The region is characterized by its diverse topography, including riverine landscapes and hilly terrains, making it a significant area within the East Siang district.

== Demographics ==
According to the 2011 Census, Mebo Village, one of the prominent villages in the Mebo Circle, has a population of 1,547 individuals residing in 280 households. The gender distribution includes 807 males and 740 females, resulting in a sex ratio of 917 females per 1,000 males, which is slightly lower than the state average of 938. Children aged 0–6 constitute approximately 14.09% of the population, with a child sex ratio of 1,037, surpassing the state average of 972.

== Administration and Political Representation ==
Mebo serves as the headquarters of the Mebo Tehsil and is part of the Mebo constituency in the Arunachal Pradesh Legislative Assembly. As of the latest available information, the constituency is represented by Oken Tayeng. The town falls under the jurisdiction of the Mebo Adc subdivision, playing a pivotal role in local governance and administration.

== Infrastructure and Connectivity ==
The town of Mebo is accessible via road, with Pasighat being the nearest major urban center. The region is connected through a network of local roads facilitating transportation and communication with neighboring areas. The postal code for Mebo is 791104, and the town hosts a postal head office to serve the communication needs of its residents.

The economy of Mebo is predominantly agrarian, with agriculture being the mainstay for the majority of its inhabitants. Raling is the cleanest village in mebo. The fertile plains and favorable climatic conditions support the cultivation of various crops, contributing to the sustenance and livelihood of the local population.

While Mebo is primarily a residential and administrative hub, its proximity to natural attractions such as the Daying Ering Wildlife Sanctuary and the scenic landscapes of Pasighat makes it a point of interest for visitors seeking to explore the natural beauty and cultural heritage of Arunachal Pradesh.
