= Rupai Siding =

- Town
- Location in Assam, India Rupai Siding (India)
- Coordinates: 27.59°N 95.55°E
- Country: India
- State: Assam
- District: Tinsukia
- Elevation: 116 m (381 ft)

Languages
  - Official: Assamese
- Time zone: UTC+5:30 (IST)
- PIN: 786153
- Vehicle registration: AS -23

Rupai Siding is a fast developing township situated in the district of Tinsukia in Assam,(in North East) India. The place is approximately 540 km from the state capital. It was a small village about 50 years ago, which is now the Industrial Township surrounded by numerous Tea gardens and Factories and Other Allied Industries. It is said that it had one of the oldest railway tracks until few years back which was used by the Britishers to transport goods and materials. This railway track connects Dibrugarh to Dangari and runs through Rupai and hence the place is a siding and came to be known as RUPAI SIDING. Beesakopie Tea Factory, the largest tea factory in Asia is very near.

== Climate ==
The average temperature in summer is around 35 °C (95 °F) while the average winter temperature is around 9 °C (48 °F).

== Tourist Attractions ==
Though tourism is a fast developing subject, Rupai Siding had fewer alternatives. Lately the township has developed into its new aura. The Dibru Saikhowa National Park is in its proximity. Wild Horses are frequently sighted and it is a biosphere reserve. The reserve is the abode for many endangered species of flora and fauna. There are many home stays in the tea gardens for the tourists. Old and authentic British built Chang Bungalows. Samdang Golf Course is an 18 Hole course is a heritage site. Often golf tournaments are held and it is sight of overwhelming as lush green meadows surround the tea estate and a tiny river flowing behind.

== Education ==
=== List Of Schools ===
- Don Bosco High School
- Jawahar Hindi High School
- Jawahar Navodaya Vidyalaya, Rangajan
- Learner's high school
- Modern academy rupai
- Rupai High School
- Rupai Jatiya Vidyalaya
- St. Francis School
- St. Mary's school
- St. Xavier's school

=== List Of Colleges ===
- DoomDooma College
- Doomdooma Junior College
- Don Bosco Junior College
- Learner's Junior College

=== List Of Coaching Institute ===
- Vintage Academy(Opp: Rupai Railway Station)
- Karma Institute of Informatics & Career Development (KIICD)
- Aptech Computer Institute
- Computer Point(Opp:Dr. Bora's Nursing & Maternity Home)

There are various other Kindergartens and primary schools setup near here. Education is most respected in this part of Assam and hence has also produced many stalwarts.

== Connectivity ==
Rupai is well connected with railway line from Makum to Dangari. Other modes of communication are local buses, Autos, Rickshaws, Share trekkers, share autos, long distance night buses. The nearest airport is Mohanbari airport near Dibrugarh which is around 60 km. Rupai Siding is on the trijunction of NH 37 and NH 52. The newly constructed Dr. Bhupen Hazarika Setu (Dhola - Sadiya Bridge) over the river Lohit is about 26 km.

A survey of 122 km Rupai-Parshuram Kund broad gauge railway line was completed by northeast frontier railways at the initiative of Arunachal Chamber of Commerce and Industries. 227 km Murkongselek-Pasighat-Tezu-Rupai line is being undertake as a strategic project.

== List of Hospitals ==
- Dr . Bora's Nursing & Maternity Home.

== List of fitness centers ==
- Deh Vikash GYM
- METABOLIC UNISEX GYM
- BIJOY NAGAR JUBOK SANGHA GYM
