= Arunachal Pradesh Congress Committee =

Arunachal Pradesh affiliate of the Indian National Congress

- President: Bosiram Siram
- Chairman: Kumar Waii
- Headquarters: Itanagar, Arunachal Pradesh
- Youth wing: Arunachal Pradesh Youth Congress
- Women's wing: Arunachal Pradesh Mahila Congress Committee
- Ideology: Liberalism (Indian)
- Political position: Centre
- ECI status: A State Unit of Indian National Congress
- Alliance: Indian National Developmental Inclusive Alliance
- Seats in Rajya Sabha: 0 / 1
- Seats in Lok Sabha: 0 / 2
- Seats in Arunachal Pradesh Legislative Assembly: 1 / 60

Election symbol

Arunachal Pradesh Congress Committee (or Arunachal PCC) is the state wing of Indian National Congress serving in Arunachal Pradesh. It is responsible for organizing and coordinating the party's activities and campaigns within the state, as well as selecting candidates for local, state, and national elections for all districts of Arunachal Pradesh. The current president of the Arunachal Pradesh Congress Committee is Bosiram Siram.

== Structure and composition ==
S.no	Name	Designation
1.	A. Chellakumar	AICC Incharge
2.	Bosiram Siram	President; Arunachal Pradesh Congress Committee
3.	Chukhu Nachi	President; Arunachal Pradesh Mahila Congress
4.	Tarh Johnny	President; Arunachal Pradesh Youth Congress
5.	Saruk Yura	President; Arunachal Pradesh NSUI
6.	Kumar Waii	CLP Leader; Arunachal Pradesh Legislative Assembly
7.	Meer Akhtar Hussain	Incharge, AICC Rajiv Gandhi Panchayati Raj Sangathan

== List of presidents ==
S.no	President	Portrait	Term		
1.	Mukut Mithi		1999	2006	7 years
2.	Omem Moyong Deori		17 August 2006	19 December 2007	1 year, 124 days
3.	Nabam Tuki		19 December 2007	19 April 2012	4 years, 122 days
(1).	Mukut Mithi		19 April 2012	12 July 2014	2 years, 84 days
4.	Padi Richo		12 July 2014	14 March 2017	2 years, 245 days
5.	Takam Sanjoy		14 March 2017	31 July 2019	2 years, 139 days
(3).	Nabam Tuki		31 July 2019	18 June 2025	7 years, 108 days
6.	Bosiram Siram		18 June 2025	Incumbent	1 year, 151 days

== List of AICC Incharges ==
#	Incharge	Portrait	Origin State/UT	Term			Ref.
1.	Luizinho Faleiro		Goa	22 August 2018	11 September 2020	2 years, 20 days	
2.	Manish Chatrath		Delhi	11 September 2020	24 December 2023	3 years, 104 days	
3.	A. Chellakumar		Tamil Nadu	24 December 2023	Incumbent	2 years, 327 days	

== Electoral performance ==
=== Arunachal Pradesh Legislative Assembly election ===
Year	Party leader	Seats won	Change in seats	Outcome
1978	Tasso Grayu	0 / 30	New	Opposition
1980	Gegong Apang	13 / 30	▲13	Government
1984	Gegong Apang	21 / 30	▲8	Government
1990	Gegong Apang	37 / 60	▲16	Government
1995	Gegong Apang	43 / 60	▲6	Government
1999	Mukut Mithi	53 / 60	▲10	Government
2004	Gegong Apang	34 / 60	▼19	Government
2009	Dorjee Khandu	42 / 60	▲8	Government
2014	Nabam Tuki	42 / 60	Steady	Government, later Opposition
2019	Nabam Tuki	4 / 60	▼38	Opposition
2024	Nabam Tuki	1 / 60	▼3	Opposition

=== Lok Sabha elections ===
Lok Sabha Elections
Year	Lok Sabha	Seats contested	Seats won	(+/-) in seats	% of votes	Vote swing	Popular vote	Outcome
1977	6th	2	1 / 2	New entry	41.25%	New entry	20,909	Opposition
1980	7th	2	2 / 2	▲1	44.13%	▲2.88	76,600	Government
1984	8th	2	2 / 2	Steady	43.32%	▼0.81	98,131	Government
1989	9th	2	2 / 2	Steady	49.99%	▲6.67	1,36,541	Opposition
1991	10th	2	2 / 2	Steady	68.92%	▲18.93	1,79,824	Government
1996	11th	2	0 / 2	▼2	28.83%	▼40.09	84,615	Opposition
1998	12th	2	0 / 2	Steady	23.90%	▼4.93	78,564	Opposition
1999	13th	2	2 / 2	▲2	56.92%	▲33.02	2,42,275	Opposition
2004	14th	1	0 / 2	▼2	9.96%	▼46.96	38,341	Government
2009	15th	2	2 / 2	▲2	51.11%	▲41.15	2,55,866	Government
2014	16th	2	1 / 2	▼1	41.22%	▼9.89	2,46,084	Opposition
2019	17th	2	0 / 2	Steady	20.69%	▼20.53	1,34,888	Opposition
2024	18th	2	0 / 2	Steady	31.70%	▲11.01	2,19,839	Opposition

== See also ==
- Indian National Congress
- Congress Working Committee
- All India Congress Committee
- Pradesh Congress Committee
- All India Mahila Congress
- Indian Youth Congress
- National Students Union of India
