= Sika Tode =

Coordinates: 27.950°N 95.342°E

Sika Tode is a village in East Siang district of Arunachal Pradesh, India.
