= Solung =

Indian tribal festival

Solung is an agricultural festival. of the Adi people of Arunachal Pradesh, India. The five-day festival is held annually in early September and marks the end of the sowing season. The festival is accompanied by the traditional dance of ponung

Cultivation is central to the livelihood of the Adi, whose traditional food and knowledge systems are closely tied to the local agricultural environment. The community holds a detailed body of traditional knowledge about the plants and biocultural resources of the eastern Himalaya, which supports its farming practices. Indigenous vegetables and other plant species gathered by the Adi are regarded as essential to the community's rituals and festivals, including Solung.
