= Dangari =

Village in Assam, India

Coordinates: 31°07′N 77°31′E

- town
- Location in Assam, India Dangari (India)
- Country: India
- State: Assam
- District: Tinsukia
- Elevation: 128 m (420 ft)

Languages
  - Official: Assamese
- Time zone: UTC+5:30 (IST)
- PIN: 786156
- Telephone code: +91-374

Dangari is a village in Saikhowa Tehsil in Tinsukia District of Assam State, India. It is located 34 km towards East from District headquarters Tinsukia. 28 km from Saikhowa, about 489 km from State capital Dispur.

Dangari is surrounded by Sadiya Tehsil towards North, Hapjan Tehsil towards South, Saikhowa Tehsil towards west, Namsai Tehsil towards East.

== Connectivity ==
Dangari is connected with railway line from Tinsukia and Makum railway junctions.
