= Kerang Village =

- Village
- Village of West Siang
- Location in Arunachal Pradesh, India Kerang Village (India)
- Coordinates: 28.324062°N 94.681923°E
- Country: India
- State: Arunachal Pradesh
- District: West Siang
- Circle: Kaying Circle

Government
  - Type: ZPM, MLA, MP
  - MP: Kiren Rijiju
- Time zone: IST (UTC+5:30)
- Students' Union Name: All Kerang Students' Union (ARSU)
- Website: www.westsiang.nic.in

Kerang Village is a small village reside at West Siang District, Arunachal Pradesh.

== Location ==
Kerang is located 34 km towards North from District headquarters Along & 205 km from State capital Itanagar.

== Fire Incident ==
Around 70 houses were gutted down by the fire at around 1.30 am on 12 November 2014. It rendered many families homeless. There was no loss of life but properties worth crores of rupees were destroyed in the fire accident. The people could not take out any of their properties. The Green Pioneer Itanagar and Adi Baane Kebang Youth Wing conducted the voluntary donation camp for the fire victims and the Chief Minister of Arunachal Pradesh, Nabam Tuki, Education Minister of Arunachal Pradesh, Tapang Taloh and other leaders had also helped the victims by donating some money, blankets, bucket etc.
