= North East Festival, Delhi =

North East Festival Delhi is an annual festival held in Delhi which showcases the culture and customs of Northeast India.
