= Arunachal Pradesh State Transport Services =

- Company type: Public Sector Corporation under the Ministry of Transport of the State Government's of Arunachal Pradesh
- Industry: Public transport bus service
- Founded: 15 December 1975
- Headquarters: Itanagar, Arunachal Pradesh, India
- Area served: Assam, Nagaland, Meghalaya
- Key people: Hage Kojen (APSTS commissioner)
- Products: Bus transport, Services
- Website: APSTS

Arunachal Pradesh State Transport Services (or APSTS) is the state-owned road transport corporation in the Indian state of Arunachal Pradesh. Its headquarters are located at APSTS Bus Station of Itanagar.

APSTS is running daily bus services from Itanagar to most district headquarters including Tezpur, Guwahati in Assam and Shillong in Meghalaya as well as Dimapur in Nagaland.
