= Abor Hills =

Region of Arunachal Pradesh, India

Coordinates: 28°25′N 94°40′E

The Abor Hills is a region of Arunachal Pradesh in the far northeast of India, near the border with China. The hills are bordered by the Mishmi Hills and Miri Hills, and drained by the Dibang River, a tributary of the Brahmaputra.

During the British Raj, the hills had a reputation as a troublesome area, and military expeditions were sent against the residents in the 1890s. The region was administered as the Abor Hills District from 1948, with headquarters at Pasighat, but later reorganized into the Lower Dibang Valley and Lohit districts.

== Colonial history ==
The Abor Hills are a tract of country on the north-east frontier of India, which was occupied by an independent tribe, the Adi people, formerly called the Abors. It lays north of Lakhimpur district, in the province of eastern Bengal and Assam, and is bounded on the east by the Mishmi Hills and on the west by the Miri Hills. The villages of the tribe extended to the Dibang river. The term Abor is an Assamese word, signifying "living free" or "independent," and is applied in a general sense by the Assamese to many frontier tribes. In its restricted sense, it refers specifically to this area because the Adi were considered to be difficult to control and resistant to centralized authority. In former times, they frequently raided the plains of Assam, and had been the object of more than one retaliatory expedition by the British government. The first Bor Abor expedition occurred in 1893–1894. Some military police sepoys were murdered in British territory. Then the Bomjir outpost was attacked by the Bor Abor men, killing 42 British sepoys. As a result, a force of 2,000 troops and 1,000 coolies was sent to the area under Col. J.F. Needham. The force traversed the Abor country and destroyed the villages involved in the murder as well as other villages that opposed the expedition. It was partially successful, though with the loss of many lives in the battle and failure to accomplish its objectives in defeating the Damroh village of Bor Abors. Therefore, a blockade was placed against them from 1894 to 1900.

The Abors, together with the cognate tribes of Miris, Daphlas and Akas, are supposed to be descended from a Tibetan stock.
