= Tapi Darang =

Indian politician

Member of Arunachal Pradesh Legislative Assembly
- Incumbent
- Assumed office 1 June 2024
- Preceded by: Kaling Moyong
- Constituency: Pasighat East

Personal details
- Party: National People's Party

Tapi Darang is an Indian politician from Arunachal Pradesh belonging to the National People's Party. He is a member of the 11th Arunachal Pradesh Legislative Assembly representing the Pasighat East constituency.

== Education ==
He graduated from College of Engineering, Pune with a Bachelor of Engineering degree in civil engineering in 1987.
