= Pasighat East Assembly constituency =

Legislative Assembly constituency in Arunachal Pradesh state, India

Coordinates: 28.058°N 95.350°E

Pasighat East
- Constituency No. 38 for the Arunachal Pradesh Legislative Assembly

Constituency details
- Country: India
- Region: Northeast India
- State: Arunachal Pradesh
- District: East Siang
- Lok Sabha constituency: Arunachal East
- Established: 1990
- Total electors: 21,899
- Reservation: ST

Member of Legislative Assembly
- 11th Arunachal Pradesh Legislative Assembly
- Incumbent Tapi Darang
- Party: PPA
- Alliance: NDA
- Elected year: 2024

Pasighat East is one of the 60 Legislative Assembly constituencies of Arunachal Pradesh state in India. It is in East Siang district and is reserved for candidates belonging to the Scheduled Tribes.

== Members of the Legislative Assembly ==
Election	Member	Party
1990	Ninong Ering	Independent politician
1995	Tobar Jamoh	Indian National Congress
1999	Ninong Ering	Indian National Congress
2004	Bosiram Siram	Bharatiya Janata Party
2009	Bosiram Siram	Indian National Congress
2014	Kaling Moyong	Bharatiya Janata Party
2019	Kaling Moyong	Bharatiya Janata Party
2024	Tapi Darang	National People's Party

== Election results ==
=== Assembly Election 2024 ===
2024 Arunachal Pradesh Legislative Assembly election : Pasighat East
Party	Candidate	Votes	%	±%
NPP	Tapi Darang	9,070	50.40%	New
BJP	Kaling Moyong	8,749	48.62%	▼3.77
NOTA	None of the Above	176	0.98%	▲0.27
Margin of victory		321	1.78%	▼5.57
Turnout		17,995	82.17%	▲1.12
Registered electors		21,899		▲5.07
NPP gain from BJP		Swing	▼1.99	

=== Assembly Election 2019 ===
2019 Arunachal Pradesh Legislative Assembly election : Pasighat East
Party	Candidate	Votes	%	±%
BJP	Kaling Moyong	8,851	52.39%	▲2.67
INC	Bosiram Siram	7,609	45.04%	▼4.35
PPA	Ennong Ering	314	1.86%	New
NOTA	None of the Above	120	0.71%	▼0.18
Margin of victory		1,242	7.35%	▲7.03
Turnout		16,894	81.06%	▲0.78
Registered electors		20,842		▲8.55
BJP hold		Swing	▲2.67	

=== Assembly Election 2014 ===
2014 Arunachal Pradesh Legislative Assembly election : Pasighat East
Party	Candidate	Votes	%	±%
BJP	Kaling Moyong	7,664	49.72%	▲47.51
INC	Bosiram Siram	7,614	49.39%	▼10.31
NOTA	None of the Above	137	0.89%	New
Margin of victory		50	0.32%	▼21.29
Turnout		15,415	80.28%	▲6.63
Registered electors		19,201		▼5.21
BJP gain from INC		Swing		

=== Assembly Election 2009 ===
2009 Arunachal Pradesh Legislative Assembly election : Pasighat East
Party	Candidate	Votes	%	±%
INC	Bosiram Siram	8,908	59.71%	▲22.42
NCP	Kaling Moyong	5,683	38.09%	New
BJP	Oyem Dai	329	2.21%	▼45.18
Margin of victory		3,225	21.62%	▲11.52
Turnout		14,920	73.66%	▲14.62
Registered electors		20,256		▲7.58
INC gain from BJP		Swing		

=== Assembly Election 2004 ===
2004 Arunachal Pradesh Legislative Assembly election : Pasighat East
Party	Candidate	Votes	%	±%
BJP	Bosiram Siram	5,267	47.38%	▲7.23
INC	Ninong Ering	4,145	37.29%	▼20.88
Independent	Nanom Jamoh	1,596	14.36%	New
AC	Okep Jamoh	108	0.97%	New
Margin of victory		1,122	10.09%	▼7.92
Turnout		11,116	57.89%	▼8.02
Registered electors		18,829		▲16.54
BJP gain from INC		Swing	▼10.79	

=== Assembly Election 1999 ===
1999 Arunachal Pradesh Legislative Assembly election : Pasighat East
Party	Candidate	Votes	%	±%
INC	Ninong Ering	6,302	58.17%	▲3.97
BJP	Bosiram Siram	4,350	40.15%	▲38.92
NCP	Onom Taknyo	182	1.68%	New
Margin of victory		1,952	18.02%	▲2.96
Turnout		10,834	68.28%	▼8.51
Registered electors		16,157		▲22.33
INC hold		Swing		

=== Assembly Election 1995 ===
1995 Arunachal Pradesh Legislative Assembly election : Pasighat East
Party	Candidate	Votes	%	±%
INC	Tobar Jamoh	5,410	54.20%	▲24.22
Independent	Ninong Ering	3,907	39.14%	New
JD	Matin Dai	541	5.42%	▼29.06
BJP	Tagam Siram	123	1.23%	New
Margin of victory		1,503	15.06%	▲14.00
Turnout		9,981	77.17%	▲6.23
Registered electors		13,208		▲14.99
INC gain from Independent		Swing	▲18.67	

=== Assembly Election 1990 ===
1990 Arunachal Pradesh Legislative Assembly election : Pasighat East
Party	Candidate	Votes	%	±%
Independent	Ninong Ering	2,830	35.53%	New
JD	Bakin Pertin	2,746	34.48%	New
INC	Opang Moyong	2,388	29.98%	New
Margin of victory		84	1.05%	
Turnout		7,964	70.17%	
Registered electors		11,486		
Independent win (new seat)				

== See also ==
- List of constituencies of Arunachal Pradesh Legislative Assembly
- East Siang district
