= Ninong Ering =

Former Member of Parliament, Lok Sabha (born 1959)

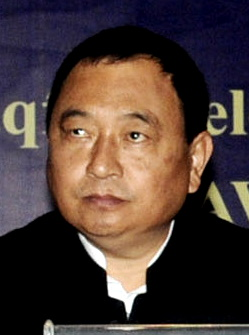
- Ering in January 2014

Member of Arunachal Pradesh Legislative Assembly
- Incumbent
- Assumed office 11 April 2019
- Preceded by: Tangor Tapak
- Constituency: Pasighat West

Member of Parliament, Lok Sabha
- In office 16 May 2009 – 11 April 2019
- Preceded by: Tapir Gao
- Succeeded by: Tapir Gao
- Constituency: East Arunachal Pradesh

Union Minister of State for Minority Affairs
- In office 28 October 2012 – 16 May 2014
- Minister: K. Rahman Khan
- Preceded by: Vincent Pala
- Succeeded by: Mukhtar Abbas Naqvi

Personal details
- Born: 3 January 1959 (age 67) Pasighat, North-East Frontier Agency, India
- Party: Bharatiya Janata Party (from 2024)
- Other political affiliations: Indian National Congress (till 2024)
- Spouse: Yarok Ering (m. 1979)
- Children: 4
- Parents: Daying Ering; Odam Ering
- Education: J. N. College, Pasighat (B.A)
- Occupation: Politician

Ninong Ering (born 3 January 1959) is an Indian politician belonging to the Bharatiya Janata Party. He represented the Arunachal East (Lok Sabha constituency) in Lok Sabha, the lower house of Indian Parliament from 2009 to 2019. He was the Union Minister of State for Minority Affairs from 2012 to 2014. He resigned from the Indian National Congress and joined the Bharatiya Janata Party on 25 February 2024.

== Political career ==
Ering was a member of the Arunachal Pradesh Legislative Assembly representing Pasighat East constituency as an independent candidate from 1990 to 1995. In 1995, he again contested from the same constituency as an independent candidate, but he was defeated by the Congress candidate Tobar Jamoh. From 1999 to 2004 he again became a member of the Arunachal Pradesh Legislative Assembly representing the same constituency as a Congress candidate. From 1999 to 2002, he was the Minister of State of the Government of Arunachal Pradesh and from 2002 to 2004, he was the Deputy Speaker of the Arunachal Pradesh Legislative Assembly. In 2009, he was elected to the 15th Lok Sabha, where he was a Member of the Standing Committee on Science & Technology, Environment & Forests and a Member of the Consultative Committee, Ministry of Civil Aviation. He was re-elected to 16th Lok Sabha from the same constituency in 2014 and again served as member of the Standing Committee on Science & Technology, Environment & Forests and the Consultative Committee, Ministry of Petroleum and Natural Gas.

=== Introduction of The Menstruation Benefit Bill, 2017 ===
Ninong Ering moved a Private Members' Bill, 'The Menstruation Benefit Bill, 2017', which proposed that women working in the public and private sectors get two days of paid menstrual leave every month. The Bill also sought to provide better facilities for rest at the workplace during menstruation. The bill triggered a nationwide debate and brought India in the list of countries like Italy, South Korea, Japan where the law existed or was debated. Ering also asked a question on whether the government has any plan to propose menstrual leave at the workplace. In its reply, the Ministry of Women and Child Development said there was no such proposal and also the ministry did not have any plan for a legislation on the issue. The Ministry, however, listed a number of awareness efforts for adolescent girls. Ninong Ering in his interview to The BloombergQuint congratulated his entire team and thanked his PRS Legislative Research LAMP Fellows for working on the bill. This initiative gained a nationwide support and Ninong Ering received applause from a number of women activists organisations.

=== Criticism of Swami Ramdev ===
On 19 February 2011, Ninong Ering allegedly criticised the anti-corruption drive of Indian religious leader Swami Ramdev and referred to him as a "bloody dog". The Bharatiya Janata Party criticised the remarks, stating that Ramdev was a revered figure and further if Mr. Ering did not consider himself to be Indian then he should excuse himself from the Indian Parliament. The Congress party claimed that it had asked for explanation from Ering on this matter.

=== Racial incident ===
In May 2021, Ering wrote a letter to Prime Minister of India Narendra Modi calling for the ban of mobile game Battlegrounds Mobile India due to concerns of Chinese espionage in dealing with Indian user data. In response to Ering's letter, YouTuber Paras Singh published a video where he called Ering a "non-Indian" and that Arunachal Pradesh "was part of China". Singh's video resulted in public backlash from Indian celebrities and politicians. Although Singh apologised for his comments on Ering in another video, he was apprehended by police in Ludhiana and was transferred to Arunachal Pradesh, where he was held in jail and given virtual lessons on the history of Arunachal Pradesh. In June 2021, Singh was released on bail after paying a personal bond of Rs 10000.

== Personal life ==
Ering belongs to the Adi tribe and is a member of the Evangelical North Eastern Hill Church Council of Arunachal Pradesh. He has four children, two daughters and two sons, and he is the son of the late Shri Daying Ering and Smt. Odam Ering.
