= Tatung Jamoh =

Indian politician

Tatung Jamoh is an Indian politician from the state of Arunachal Pradesh.

Jamoh was elected unopposed from Pasighat West in the 2014 Arunachal Pradesh Legislative Assembly election, standing as a People's Party of Arunachal candidate. In terms of educational qualification, he is a graduate.

== See also ==
- Arunachal Pradesh Legislative Assembly
