= Tangor Tapak =

Indian politician

Tangor Tapak MLA of 37 Pasighat West (ST) Constituency

Minister of Health & Family Welfare

Assembly Member for Legislative Assembly of Arunachal Pradesh
- In office 2009 – 9 April 2014
- Succeeded by: Tatung Jamoh

Personal details
- Party: BJP

Tangor Tapak is an Indian politician associated with the BJP party in Arunachal Pradesh.

== Early life ==
Tapak is a physician with the state health system. In the 1999 election for the Legislative Assembly of Arunachal Pradesh he defeated Yadag Apang, the wife of Chief Minister Gegong Apang. He served as State health minister. He lost the 2004 election for the Pasighat West seat to Omak Apang, the son of Gegong and Yadag Apang, but contested the seat again in the 2009 election and won. In November 2009 he became the victim of a shooting by unknown assailants that severely damaged his car but left him uninjured. He retired from his post as State president of the BJP on 11 February 2014 and lost his seat in the legislative assembly in the May 2014 election.
