= Tapir Gao =

Indian politician (born 1964)

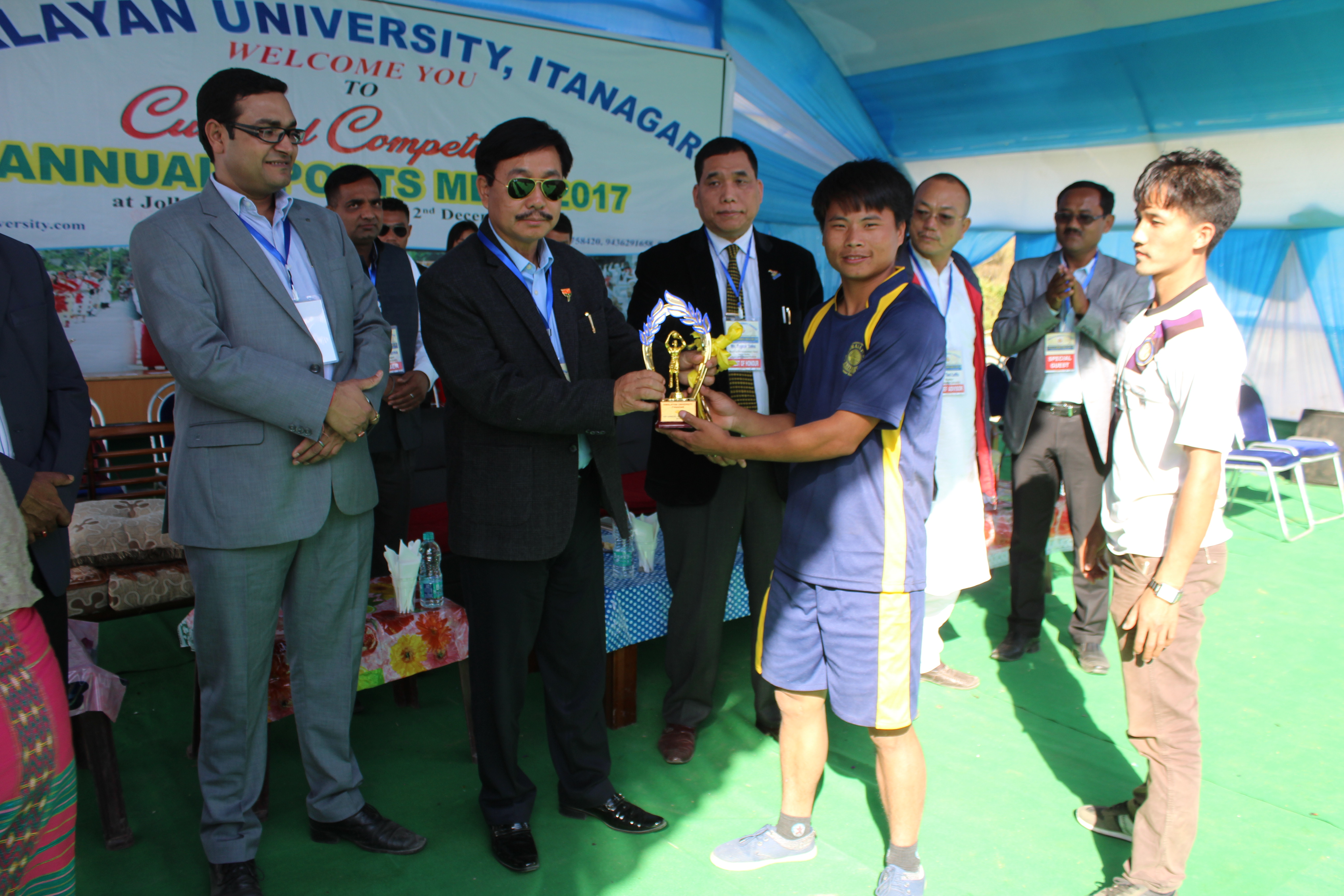
- Gao (sunglasses) at an event in Itanagar, 2019

Member of Parliament, Lok Sabha
- Incumbent
- Assumed office 23 May 2019
- Preceded by: Ninong Ering
- Constituency: East Arunachal Pradesh
- In office 13 May 2004 – 16 May 2009
- Preceded by: Wangcha Rajkumar
- Succeeded by: Ninong Ering
- Constituency: East Arunachal Pradesh

Personal details
- Born: 1 October 1964 (age 62) Molom, North-East Frontier Agency, India
- Party: Bharatiya Janata Party
- Spouse: Yamot Dui Gao (m. 1989)
- Children: 3
- Education: Arunachal University of Studies
- As of 1 March, 2006

Tapir Gao (born 1 October 1964) is an Indian politician. He is the president of Arunachal Pradesh unit of Bharatiya Janata Party (BJP). He was a member of the 14th Lok Sabha (2004-2009), representing the Arunachal East constituency for BJP. He lost from that seat in 2009 and 2014, but was re-elected to Lok Sabha in 2019. Gao was General Secretary of BJP in 2011 and is currently serving as national executive member of the BJP.

In February 2020, in the Lok Sabha, he raised the issue of several areas in Arunachal Pradesh being left out from the political map of India. This included Hadigra Dakahru Pass and Galai Tagaru Pass in Chaglagam area.

He resides at Village Ruksin in East Siang district.
