= East Siang district =

- District of Arunachal Pradesh
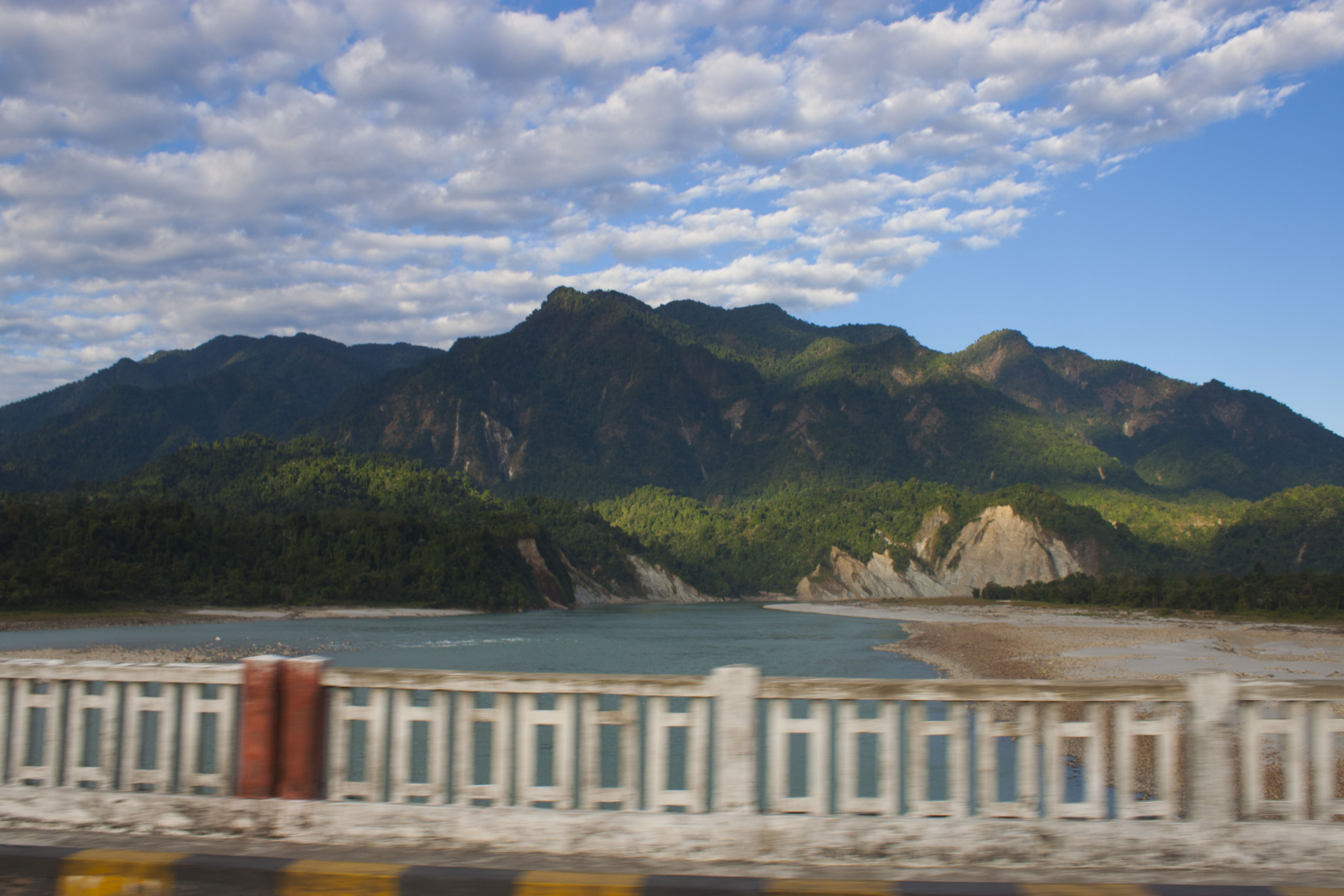
- Siang river entering plains at Ranaghat
- Interactive map of East Siang district
- Coordinates: 28.07°N 95.33°E
- Country: India
- State: Arunachal Pradesh
- Headquarters: Pasighat

Government
  - Lok Sabha constituencies: Tapir Gao
  - Vidhan Sabha constituencies: Lombo Tayeng, Tapi Darang, Ninong Ering

Area
  - Total: 4,005 km^{2} (1,546 sq mi)

Population (2011)
  - Total: 70,956
  - Density: 17.72/km^{2} (45.89/sq mi)
  - Urban: Yes

Demographics
  - Literacy: 73.5%
  - Sex ratio: 962
- Time zone: UTC+05:30 (IST)
- Major highways: NH-52
- Website: eastsiang.nic.in

East Siang district (/ˈsjæŋ/ or /ˈsɪæŋ/) is an administrative district in the state of Arunachal Pradesh in India.

== History ==
The plains, foothills and lower hills of the district were part of the Chutia kingdom while the higher hills were inhabited by Adi people. After the defeat of Chutias by Ahoms, the region was gradually settled by Adis.

In 1989 territory was transferred from West Siang district to East Siang. A decade later, in 1999, the district was bifurcated to make Upper Siang district. East Siang district was first settled by Dibu-marang clans and was later driven away by some padam clan (subtribe of adi). Later padam clans accompanied it's close ally pasi and settled near padam mone and balek respectively. Later, due to epidemic (considered as spiritual) in the mone areas padams had to retreat.

== Geography ==
The district headquarters are located at Pasighat. East Siang district occupies an area of 4,005 square kilometres (1,546 sq mi), comparatively equivalent to Indonesia's Nias Island.

== Divisions ==
There are 5 Arunachal Pradesh Legislative Assembly constituencies located in this district: Pasighat West, Pasighat East, and Mebo. All of these are part of Arunachal East Lok Sabha constituency. The district consists of 6 circles: Mebo, Namsing, Sile-Oyan, Pasighat, Bilat and Ruksin.

== Demographics ==
Historical population
Year	Pop.	±% p.a.
1961	32,421	—
1971	33,138	+0.22%
1981	55,170	+5.23%
1991	71,864	+2.68%
2001	87,397	+1.98%
2011	99,214	+1.28%

According to the 2011 census East Siang district has a population of 99,214, roughly equal to the nation of Kiribati. This gives it a ranking of 615th in India (out of a total of 640). The district has a population density of 27 inhabitants per square kilometre (70/sq mi) . Its population growth rate over the decade 2001–2011 was 13.3%. East Siang has a sex ratio of 962 females for every 1000 males, and a literacy rate of 73.54%. After division, the residual district has a population of 70,956. Scheduled Tribes make up 46,334 which is 65.30% of the population.

=== Religion ===
Religions in East Siang district (2011)
Religion	Per cent
Donyi-Poloism	46.12%
Hinduism	33.26%
Christianity	15.85%
Islam	3.01%
Buddhism	0.94%
Other or not stated	0.82%

Languages of West Kameng (2011)
1. Adi (68.7%)
2. Nepali (10.2%)
3. Hindi (7.26%)
4. Bengali (4.27%)
5. Assamese (2.77%)
6. Boro (1.70%)
7. Mising (1.54%)
8. Others (3.47%)

Religions recorded as 'other' in the census, mainly Donyi-Polo, make up 32,728 which is 46.12% of the population. Hinduism is a sizeable minority religion which makes up 23,597 which is 33.26% of the population. Christians make up 11,249 which is 15.85% of the population. Muslims are 2,137 which is 3.01% of the population. Buddhists are 670 which is 0.94% of the population.

Various tribal groups of the Adi people live in various parts of the district. The local people traditionally follow Donyi-Polo, although a sizeable minority have converted to Christianity.

=== Languages ===
At the time of the 2011 census, 62.78% of the population spoke Adi, 12.17% Nepali, 8.29% Hindi, 5.12% Bengali, 4.82% Bhojpuri, 3.34% Assamese, 1.80% Mishing and 1.32% Boro as their first language.

== Flora and fauna ==
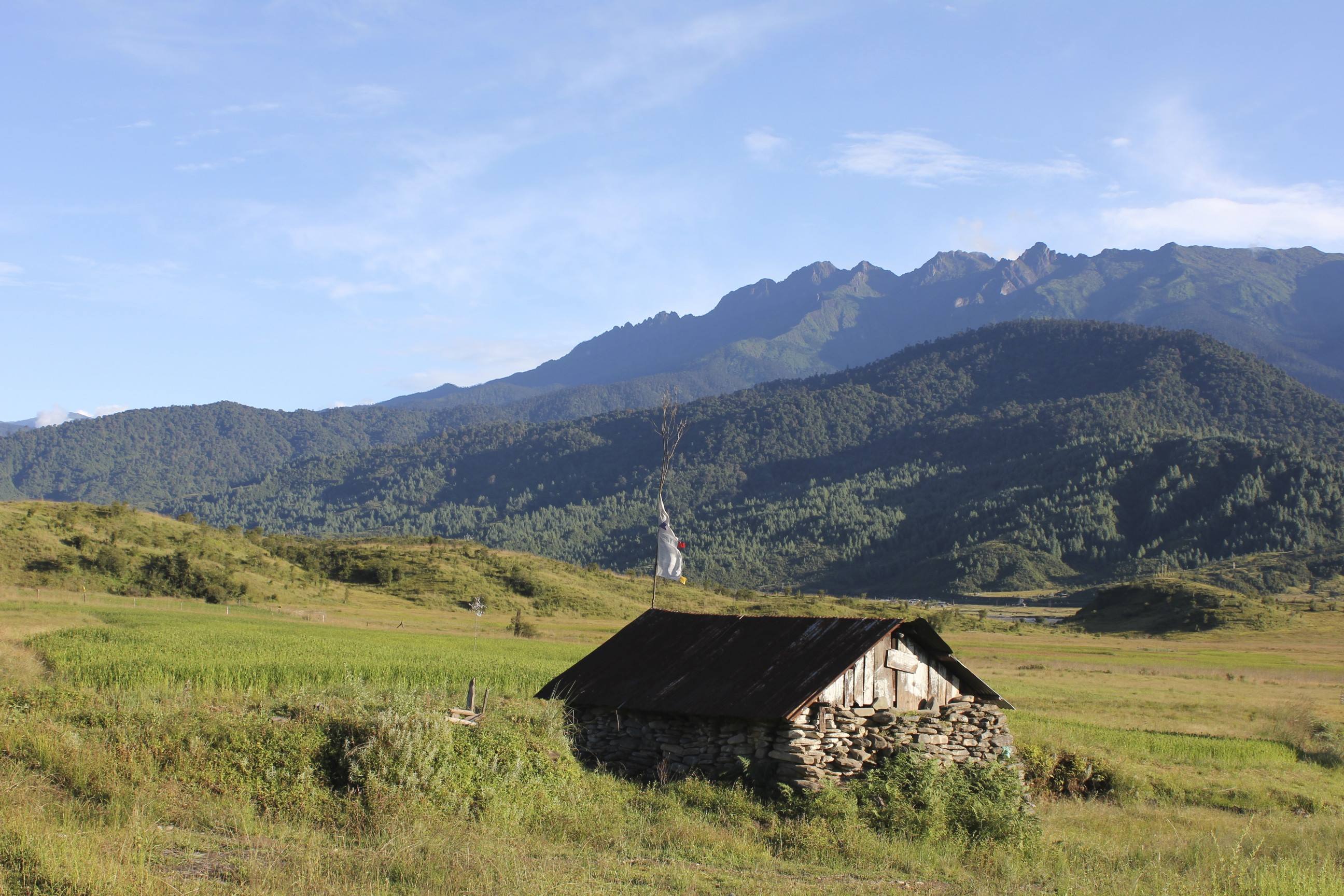
East Siang District

In 1978 East Siang district became home to the D’Ering Memorial (Lali) Wildlife Sanctuary, which has an area of 190 km^{2} (73.4 mi^{2}).
