= List of cities in Arunachal Pradesh by population =

== Cities and Towns in Changlang District ==
- Bordumsa
- Bubang
- Changlang (North and South)
- Chopelling
- Deban
- Dharampur
- Gandhigram
- Jairampur
- Kharsang
- Khemiyong
- Kherem Bisa
- Kutum
- Lallung
- Manabhum
- Manmao
- Miao
- Namchik
- Namdang
- Namphai
- Nampong
- Namtok
- New Kamlao
- New Mohang
- Rajanagar
- Rangfrah
- Ranglom
- Two-hat
- Vijaynagar
- Vijoypur
- Yangkang

== Cities and Towns in Dibang Valley District ==
- Alinye
- Anelih
- Anini
- Etalin

== Cities and Towns in East Kameng District ==
- Bameng
- Bana
- Chyangtajo
- Khenewa
- Lada
- P.kessang
- Palizi
- Pipu-dipu
- Seijosa
- Seppa
- Thrizino
- Veo

== Cities and Towns of East Siang District ==
- Adipasi
- Ayeng
- Balek
- Bilat
- Boleng
- Borguli
- Dalbing
- Damro
- Debing
- Gtc
- Hill Top
- Kebang
- Korang
- Koyu
- Ledum
- Mebo
- Namsing
- Nari
- Ngopok
- Oyan
- Pangin
- Pasighat
- Rani
- Renging
- Riga
- Yagrung
- Mirem
- Mikong
- Debing
- Miglung

== Cities and Towns in Kurung Kumey District ==
- Chambang
- Damin
- Hiya
- Koloriang
- Nyapin
- Palin
- Sangram
- Sarli
- Tali

== Cities and Towns in Lohit District ==
- Alubari
- Chakma
- Changliang
- Danglat
- Gohaingaon
- Innao
- Jaipur
- Kamlang Nagar
- Kherem
- Kumari Kachari
- Kumsai
- Lohitpur
- Loiliang
- Manmao
- Medo
- Momong
- Nanam
- Podumani
- Sunpura
- Tafragram
- Tezu
- Tezu Covt.college
- Tindolong
- Udaipur
- Wakro
- Wingko
- Yealing

== Cities and Towns of Lower Dibang Valley District ==
- Abango
- Anupam
- Bijari
- Bolung
- Bomjir
- Dambuk
- Desali
- Elopa
- Hunli
- Iduli
- Jia
- Koranu
- Kronli
- Meka
- Paglam
- Parbuk
- Roing
- Santipur

== Cities and Towns of Lower Subansiri District ==
- Boasimla
- Chimpu
- Deed
- Godak
- Hija
- Joram
- Mengio
- Old Ziro
- Raga
- Ranga Nadi Project
- Talo
- Yachuli
- Yazali
- Ziro

== Cities and Towns of Namsai District ==
- Chowkham
- Kaisu
- Lathao
- Mahadevpur
- Namsai
- Peyong

== Cities and Towns of Papum Pare District ==
- A P Sectt.
- Arunachal University
- Balijan
- Banderdewa
- Doimukh
- Donyi-Polo
- Hawa Camp
- Itanagar
- Kheel
- Kimin
- Kokila
- Midpu
- Model Village
- Naharlagun
- Nirjuli
- Ram Krishna Mission
- Saglee
- Sonajuli
- Vivek Vihar
- Yupia

== Cities and Towns of Tawang District ==
- B.supply
- Damteng
- Gispu
- Jang
- Kitpi
- Lhou
- Lumberdung
- Lumla
- Mukto
- Sakpret
- Tawang
- Temple Gompa
- Thingbu
- Zimithang

== Cities and Towns of Tirap District ==
- Borduria
- Dadam
- Deomali
- Hukanjuri
- K/nokno
- Kaimai
- Kanubari
- Kapu
- Khela
- Kheti
- Khonsa
- Khonsa Basti
- Khotnu
- Lazu
- Longding
- Longfong
- Minthong
- Nampong
- Namsang
- Namsang Mukh
- Narottam Nagar
- Nginu
- Niausa
- Panchou
- Senewa
- Soha
- Thinsa
- Tissa
- Tupi
- Valley View
- Wakka

== Cities and Towns of Upper Siang District ==
- Geku
- Gelling
- Karko
- Mariyang
- Migging
- Shimong
- Singa
- Tuting
- Yingkiong

== Cities and Towns of Upper Subansiri District ==
- Daporijo
- Dumporijo
- Giba
- Lemiking
- Lepajaring
- Maro
- Muri
- Nacho
- Sippi
- Siyum
- Tabarijo
- Taksing
- Taliha

== Cities and Towns of West Kameng District ==
- Balemu
- Bhalukpong
- Bomdila
- Dahung
- Dedza
- Dirang
- Dirang Basti
- Kalaktang
- Khellong
- Lish
- Munna Camp
- Nafra
- Rupa
- Salari
- Sangti
- Senge
- Shergaon
- Singchung
- Tenga Market
- Tenzingaon
- Tippi

== Cities and Towns in West Siang District ==
- Along
- Bagra
- Bame
- Basar
- Bene
- Dali
- Darak
- Daring
- Darka
- Garu
- Gensi
- Kambang
- Kaying
- Kombo
- Likabali
- Liromoba
- Logum Jining
- Mechuka
- Monigong
- Nikte
- Payum
- Rumgong
- Tato
- Tirbin
- Vivek Nagar
- Yoji Yora
- Yomcha
