= List of institutions of higher education in Arunachal Pradesh =

This is a list of institutions of higher education in Arunachal Pradesh:

As of 15 March 2024, Arunachal Pradesh has one central university, one state university, one deemed university, eight private universities and one state private Open University.

Universities of Arunachal Pradesh
University	Location	Type	Established	Specialization	Website
Arunachal Pradesh University	Pasighat	State Affiliating University	2022	Arts & Social Sciences, Commerce & Management	www.apupsg.ac.in
Arunachal University of Studies	Namsai, Arunachal Pradesh	State private - non-affiliating	2012	Engineering & Technology, Paramedical Sciences, Management, Agriculture, Arts, Social Sciences, Design, Performing Arts, Commerce, Management and Legal Studies.	www.arunachaluniversity.ac.in
Apex Professional University	Pasighat	State Private University	2013	Professional courses: Pharmacy, Vedic Studies, Science, Education, Legal Studies, Library & Information Science, Commerce & Management, Arts & Social Science, Paramedical Science and Skill Development & Vocational Studies	www.apexuniversity.edu.in
Central Institute of Himalayan Cultural Studies	Tenga Valley, West Kameng District, Arunachal Pradesh	Affiliated to Sanskrit University Varanasi, funded by Ministry of Culture, Government of India			www.cihcs.edu.in
Himalayan University	Itanagar	State private - non-affiliating	2013	All courses	www.himalayanuniversity.com
Indira Gandhi Technological and Medical Sciences University	Ziro	Technical and medical university - unitary	May 2012	Medical, Engineering, Paramedical Sciences, Management, Agriculture	www.igtamsu.ac.in
North East Frontier Technical University (NEFTU)	Along, Arunachal Pradesh	Technical university	March 2014	Engineering, Paramedical Sciences, Management, Arts & Science	www.neftu.edu.in
Venkateshwara Open University	Itanagar	Private open university - non-affiliating	2012	Open learning	www.vou.ac.in
North Eastern Regional Institute of Science and Technology	Nirjuli	Deemed - non-affiliating	1986 (2005^{†})	Technology, Science, Management	www.nerist.ac.in
Rajiv Gandhi University	Itanagar	Central - affiliating	1984	General	www.rgu.ac.in
The Global University	Itanagar	State Private University	2017	General	www.tgu.ac.in

^{†} granted deemed university status

== Architecture colleges ==
Architecture colleges in Arunachal Pradesh
Institute	Location	Type	Establishment	Courses	Website
Department of Architecture, Indira Gandhi Technological and Medical Sciences University	Ziro	Private	2014	B.Arch.	http://www.igtamsu.ac.in

== Engineering colleges ==
Engineering colleges in Arunachal Pradesh
Institute	Location	Type	Establishment	Courses	Website
Faculty of Engineering & Technology, Arunachal University of Studies	Namsai	State University	2012	Diploma, BTech, MTech, Phd	http://www.arunachaluniversity.ac.in
North Eastern Regional Institute of Science and Technology	Nirjuli	Central	1986	Certificate, Diploma, BTech, MTech, Phd	http://www.nerist.ac.in
National Institute of Technology, Arunachal Pradesh	Yupia	Central	2010	BTech	http://www.nitap.in/
Rajiv Gandhi Government Polytechnic	Itanagar	State	2002	Diploma	http://www.rggp.ac.in
Tomi Polytechnic College	Basar	Private	2006	Diploma	
Department of Engineering And Technology, Indira Gandhi Technological and Medical Sciences University, Ziro, Arunachal Pradesh	Ziro	Private	2012	Diploma (Engineering) - B.Tech Integrated, B.Tech.	
North East Frontier Technical University Campus	Aalo, West Siang	Private Technical University	2014	B.Tech	http://www.neftu.edu.in/

== Medical colleges ==
Medical colleges in Arunachal Pradesh
College	Location	Type	Establishment	Courses	Website
North East Homeopathic Medical College	Itanagar	Central	2002	BHMS	
Faculty of Medical And Paramedical Sciences, Indira Gandhi Technological and Medical Sciences University	Ziro	Private	2012	Bachelor in Physiotherapy (BPT), B.Sc. (Radiology and Imaging Technology), B.Sc. (Optometry)	
Tomo Riba Institute of Health and Medical Sciences	Naharlagun	Government	2017	MBBS	https://www.trihms.org/
IGTAMSU School of Nursing, Indira Gandhi Technological and Medical Sciences University	Ziro	Private	2015	A.N.M.	

== Law colleges ==
Law colleges in Arunachal Pradesh
College	Location	Type	Establishment	Courses	Website
Faculty of Legal Studies, Arunachal University of Studies	Namsai	University	2012	Ph.D., LLM, LLB & BA-LLB Integrated	http://www.arunachaluniversity.ac.in/
Arunachal Law Academy	Naharlagun	Private	2007	LLB	https://web.archive.org/web/20120331210552/http://arunachallawacademy.org/
Jarbom Gamlin Govt Law College	Jote	State	2019	LLB	http://jgglc.ac.in/index.html

== Degree colleges ==
Degree colleges in Arunachal Pradesh
College	Location	Type	Establishment	Courses	Website
Wangcha Rajkumar Government College	Deomali	State	1997	B.A, B.Com	https://www.wrgcollege.edu.in/
Arunachal Community College	Itanagar	Private	2009		
College of Horticulture & Forestry	Pasighat	Central	2001	BSc	
Daying Ering College of Teacher's Education	Pasighat	Private	2010	BEd	
Dera Natung Government College	Itanagar	State	1979	BA, BCom, BSc	
Don Bosco College	Itanagar	Private	2002	BA	http://www.dbcitanagar.com
Donyi Polo Govt. College	Kamki	State	1996	BA	
Doying Gumin College	Pasighat	Private	2004	BA	
Government College	Bomdila	State	1988	BA	
Government College	Seppa	State	2009	BA	
Government College	Yachuli	State	2007	BA	
Government Degree College	Daporijo	State	2012	BA	
Government Degree College	Doimukh	State	2012	BA	
Hills College of Teacher Education	Naharlagun	Private	2006	BEd	http://www.hcte.org/
Indira Gandhi Govt. College	Tezu	State	1986	BA, BCom	http://iggctezu.org/
Jawaharlal Nehru College	Pasighat	State	1964	BA, BCom, BSc	http://jncpasighat.org
Model College, Geku	Geku	State	2014	BA, B.Com, BSc.	
Rang Frah Govt. College	Changlang	State	1996	BA	
St Claret College	Ziro	Private	2003	BA, B.Com, Mass Com	http://www.sccz.edu.in
Siang Royal Academy	Pasighat	Private	2011	BEd	http://www.siangroyalacademy.com
St. Francis De Sales College	Along	Private	2007	BA	
Tadar Taniang Govt. Degree College	Nyapin	State	2012	BA	
Dorjee Khandu Government College	Tawang	State	2016	BA	

== Autonomous institution ==
- National Institute of Technology, Arunachal Pradesh
