= Nirjuli =

Nirjuli (Nirubjuli)
- Town/City
- Location in Arunachal Pradesh, India Nirjuli (India)
- Coordinates: 27.13°N 93.74°E
- Country: India
- State: Arunachal Pradesh
- District: Papum Pare

Languages
  - Official: English
- Time zone: UTC+5:30 (IST)
- PIN: 791109
- Telephone code: 91360
- Vehicle registration: AR
- Nearest city: Naharlagun
- Climate: Cwa

Nirjuli is a town in the Papum Pare district of Arunachal Pradesh in Northeast India. It is 19 km (12 mi) away from Itanagar, the capital of Arunachal Pradesh, and it takes about 40–45 minutes by road from Nirjuli to Itanagar. The National Highway 52A (now NH 415) is a highway that runs through the town and provides the primary platform for easy transportation and access within the town and to the outside world as well. The Par River (Arunachal Pradesh), the only river flowing by the town which adds to its exquisite beauty, and ultimately flows into the Brahmaputra River.

It is 10 km (6.2 mi) away from Banderdewa, the border between Assam and Arunachal Pradesh and it takes about 30 minutes by road from Banderdewa to Nirjuli following NH 52A (now NH415) which originates from Banderdewa itself. The railway transportation project which will soon connect Nirjuli and Guwahati is under construction.

== Climate ==
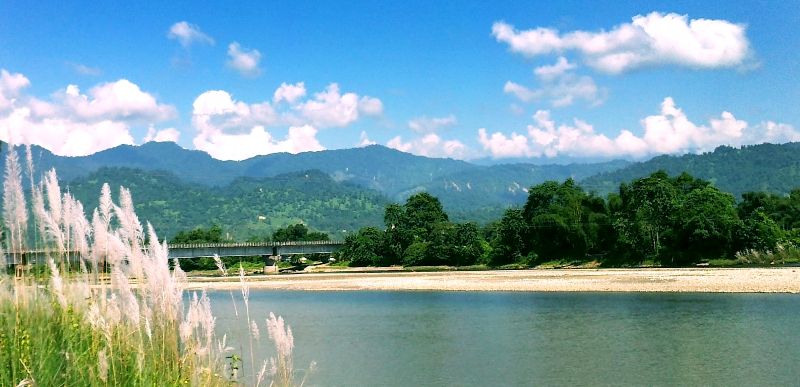
River Dikrong, Nirjuli, Arunachal Pradesh

A warm but pleasant climate prevails in Nirjuli all through the year. Post Monsoon, winter and spring (October to April) are marked with cool climates, especially winter months. During this season temperature ranges between 22 and 15 °C (72 and 59 °F). Summer during May to June and monsoon season during July to September are also pleasant. It receives heavy showers about 2,000 to 4,000 mm (160 in) between the months of May and September yearly. Monsoon temperature oscillates between 30 and 18 °C (86 and 64 °F). Summer temperature can soar up to 40 °C (104 °F) some days. Breezes from Himalayan ranges make the winter climate freezing cool.

== Culture ==
Nyokum celebrated with zeal, main venue being Nyokum Nia Hall where Local festivals as well as Music and Fashion shows are held.

== Demographics ==
The majority of the population belongs to the Nyishi tribe. Other tribes like Adi, Apatani, Nocte, Wangcho, Monpa, Galo and many other subtribes reside too.

People come from many different states to live, work and study here. Staffs and students of NERIST are one of the best example who come from different parts of the country.

== Economy ==
Tourism in Nirjuli is not as lucrative as other districts in Arunachal Pradesh. Horticulture too has a great influence on the economy of the town. The climate and topography of Nirjuli is conducive to horticultural products like ginger, spices, bamboo, cardamom and mushroom, aromatic and medicinal plants. The livestocks are the sources of milk, meat, manure, egg; thus contributing to the family as well as economy. In recent years, pisciculture has also become an important source of employment and income in Nirjuli.

The major industries are sawmills and plywood (both of them are illegal in the state). Rice mills, fruit preservation units and handloom handicrafts contributes their share to the economy of the state

The State Bank of India is the only bank in the town which is located inside the NERIST campus.

The Railway Transportation Project which will soon connect Nirjuli and Guwahati is of great importance for the economy of the town and the whole state.

== Education ==
The key academic resource is the North Eastern Regional Institute of Science and Technology (NERIST) (Deemed University), under MHRD, Government of India, producing a plethora of skillful engineers and entrepreneurs every year, currently working in various parts of the globe. Kendriya Vidyalaya and Vivekananda Kendra Vidyalaya, under CBSE, are among the best schools in the town besides other Secondary and Higher Secondary schools .

== Lodging ==
There are few places to lodge in the town, the nearest place with accommodation is Naharlagun which is around 8 km from Nirjuli and can be reached using local transport in 10–15 minutes. Newly selected NERIST candidates can stay at the institute guest house by obtaining permission from the registrar of NERIST.

== Transportation ==
The national highway NH-52A passes through Nirjuli and connects this place to the rest of the nation. By road, one can reach Nirjuli by bus service from Guwahati via Banderdewa. Various bus services are available for transportation, including Network Bus service, Blue Hill Bus service, and Volvo. It takes 8 to 10 hours to reach Nirjuli from Guwahati. Nirjuli can also be reached by train from Rangia or Guwahati to reach Naharlagun. From Naharlagun vehicles are available for Nirjuli.

Travelers should carry a valid inner line permit to enter the gate of Banderdewa. This inner line permit can either be collected from the District Collector's office from Naharlagun. The inner line permit can also be obtained in any state from the respective district collectors. Foreigners who come to visit the state need a different permit known as Protected Area Permit (PAP)

By air, one can reach by Pawan Hans helicopter service from Guwahati. The helicopter services are available from Lokpriya Gopinath Bordoloi International Airport, Guwahati (airport code: GAU) thrice a week.

Under the Jawaharlal Nehru National Urban Renewal Mission, three projects costing US$39.2 million have been sanctioned for Itanagar, the state capital. The urban transport project was approved in 2009 by which local urban transportation services were started by JNNURM in Nirjuli. The Railway Transportation Project is under construction and shall be completed very soon.
