= Ratu Techi =

Indian politician

Member of the Arunachal Pradesh Legislative Assembly

Ratu Techi (born 1965) is an Indian politician from Arunachal Pradesh. He is an MLA of the Bharatiya Janata Party from the Sagalee Assembly Constituency in Papum Pare district. He was elected to the 2024 Arunachal Pradesh Legislative Assembly election unopposed.

== Early life and education ==
Techi was born in Rigo village but lives in Nimte village in Papum Pare district. He studied in government schools in Sagalee and Doimukh. Later, he studied engineering and joined the government as an Assistant Engineer in the Public Works Department of Arunachal Pradesh in 1989. He was an active ABVP leader for many years. In 2019, he took voluntary retirement as superintendent of engineering to enter politics. He was a recipient of a National Talent Research Organisation scholarship during middle school.

== Career ==
Techi was elected unopposed to the Sagalee Assembly Constituency representing the Bharatiya Janata Party. He is one among the 10 BJP candidates who were elected unopposed as MLAs in the 2024 Arunachal Pradesh Legislative Assembly election. He is the first BJP MLA in the Sagalee seat which was dominated by Indian National Congress MLAs from 1991. Nabam Tuki, former chief minister and a five-time Congress MLA from Sagalee, chose to contest the Lok Sabha election this time but lost.

"I wanted to join politics to give something back to society. I come from a very poor economic background and have worked hard to reach where I am now. I will try my best to ensure that many more poor kids come out of poverty through proper education and support," Techi told Arunachal Times newspaper.
