= Dikrong River =

River in India

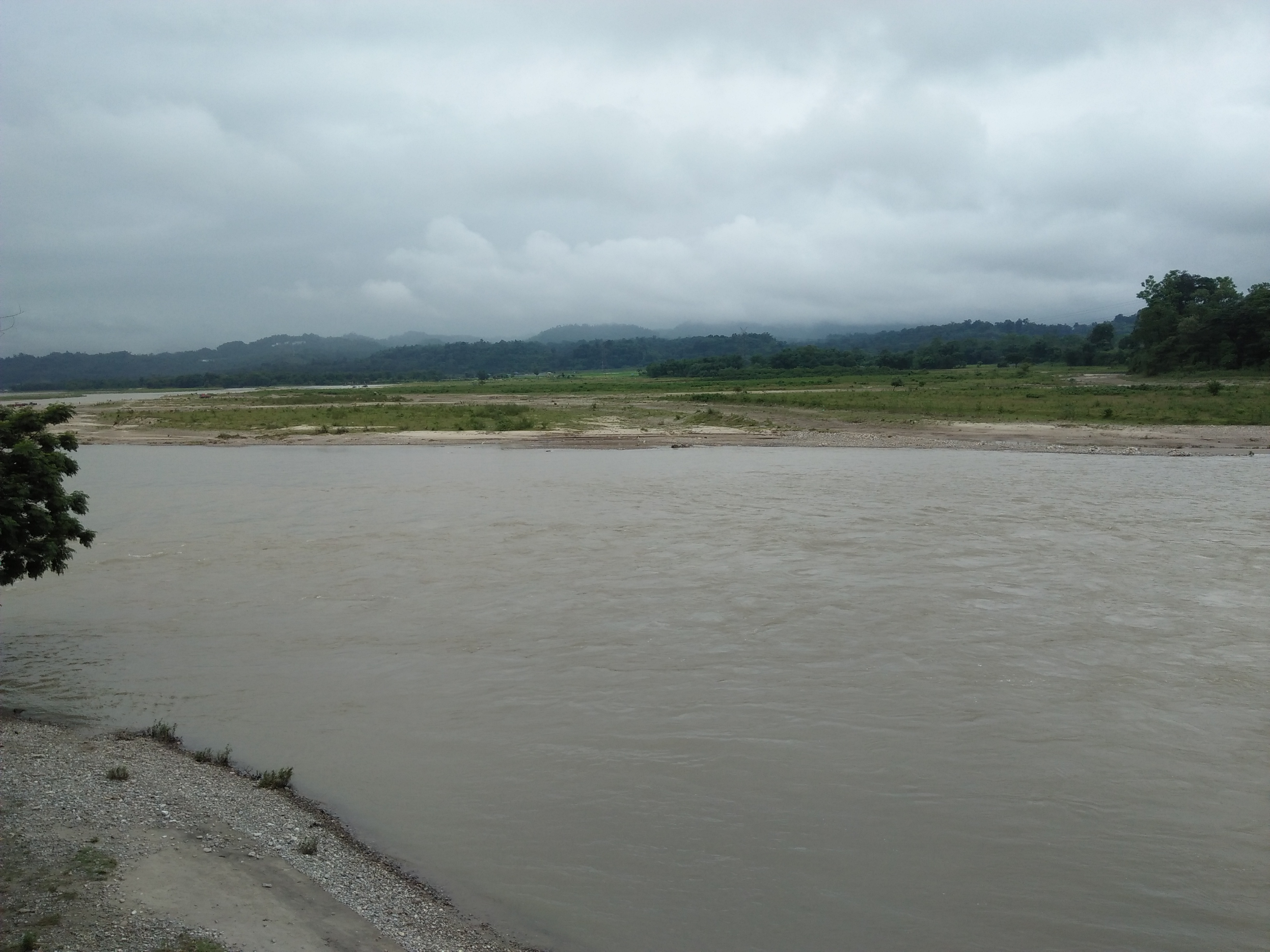
- Dikrong river at Banderdewa

- Location within Assam Location within India
- Native name: দিক্ৰং নদী (Assamese)

Location
- State: Arunachal Pradesh & Assam

Physical characteristics
- Source: Sub-Himalayan hills, Papum Pare district
  - location: Arunachal Pradesh
  - coordinates: 27°08′06.2″N 93°34′06.0″E
- Mouth: Subansiri River
  - location: Near Majuli, Assam
  - coordinates: 26°57′48.9″N 93°59′32.1″E

Basin features
- Progression: Dikrong River - Subansiri River - Brahmaputra River

The Dikrong River is a sub-tributary of the Brahmaputra River in the Indian state of Assam. The Dikrong river originates in the hills of Arunachal Pradesh and flows through major cities like Nirjuli in Arunachal Pradesh and Bihpuria in Assam before its confluence with the Subansiri River.

== History ==
A description of the Dikrong river is found in the early religious book Kalika Purana, where the river was mentioned as Dikkar Basini.

== Tributaries of Dikrong ==
Left bank tributaries of hill areas:

- Keyate Nadi
- Pang Nadi (Nadi means river in Assamese language)
- Shu Pabung
- Peti Nalla

Right bank tributaries of hill areas:

- Ranchi Pabung
- Pachin Nadi

Left bank tributaries of plain areas:

- Beguli Nadi

Right bank tributaries of plain areas:

- Kachikata Nadi
