= North Eastern Regional Institute of Science and Technology =

Indian educational institution

- Emblem of NERIST
- Motto: Aṣṭādaun prāntabhūmi prajñā
- Motto in English: The Confluence, the Region of Eight States
- Type: Public Deemed University
- Established: 4 March 1984 (42 years ago)
- Parent institution: Ministry of Education
- Academic affiliations: UGC; AIU
- Budget: ₹136.63 crore (US$14.2 million) (2024–25)
- Chairperson: M. S. M. Rawat
- Director: Narendranath S.
- Faculty: 152 (2025)
- Students: 2,150 (2025)
- Undergraduates: 1,495 (2025)
- Postgraduates: 379 (2025)
- Doctoral students: 276 (2025)
- Location: Nirjuli, Arunachal Pradesh, India; 27°07′50″N 93°44′35″E
- Campus: Remote Town 513 acres (208 ha)
- Colors: Red
- Website: www.nerist.ac.in www.neeonline.ac.in

North Eastern Regional Institute of Science and Technology (or NERIST) is a science and technology oriented higher education institute in Nirjuli, Itanagar, Papum Pare district, in the Indian state of Arunachal Pradesh. Established in 1984, it is a deemed to be university, autonomous, fully funded and controlled by the Ministry of Human Resource Development, Department of Education, Government of India. The institute is managed by a Board of Management, comprising representatives of Ministry of Education, GOI, the eight beneficiary states of the North Eastern region, AICTE and educationists.

== History ==
The beginning of the North Eastern Regional Institute of Science and Technology was with a 1979 proposal by the Government of Arunachal Pradesh to establish a science and technology institute. A report prepared by a team of professors from the Indian Institute of Management, Ahmedabad in 1981–82, was submitted to the North Eastern Council (NEC) which approved it, paving the way to the registering of the society for the institute on 11 January 1983. NEC set up a working group headed by Amitabha Bhattacharyya of Jadavpur University, which submitted a project report and a work plan in October 1983. The report was approved by the Ministry of Education in December that year, though final approval from the Ministry of Education was on a letter dated 12 September 1985.

The foundation stone of the institute was set on 4 March 1984 by the president of India, Giani Zail Singh. The institute started operating in 1986 with six base modules. Six diploma modules started in 1988 and by 1990 seven degree modules were added. The institute was funded by NEC until, in April 1994, it came directly under the full funding and control of the Ministry of Human Resource Development (MHRD). In May 2005 it was granted deemed university status. NERIST gained approval for the postgraduate programme from AICTE and MHRD in 1996, and the latter was implemented by 2006.

The first Convocation of the institute, marking the Silver Jubilee celebration of the establishment of the institute, was held on 1 April 2009 in the presence of the president of India Pratibha Patil. The Second Convocation was graced by the presence of former president of India Dr. A. P. J. Abdul Kalam held in August 2010. Besides the then director of NERIST, Dr. Joram Begi, the State Governor of Arunachal Pradesh and president of NERIST Society, J. J. Singh and the Director of IIT Guwahati and Chairperson of NERIST Board of Management, Prof. Gautam Baruah were among the other dignitaries who had attended the occasion. Third Convocation of the institute was held on 12 October 2012 in the presence of Union Minister for Human Resource Development Kapil Sibal

=== Chairperson of NERIST Society ===
H.S.DUBEY, IAS, Lt. Governor of Arunachal Pradesh	11 January 1983 – 9 August 1983		
T. V., IPS, Lt. Governor of Arunachal Pradesh	10 August 1983 – 20 November 1985		
Shiv Swarup, IPS, Lt. Governor of Arunachal Pradesh	21 November 1985 – 19 February 1987		
Bhisma Narain Singh, Governor of Arunachal Pradesh	20 February 1987 – 18 March 1987		
R. D. Pradhan, IAS (Retd.), Governor of Arunachal Pradesh	19 March 1987 – 16 March 1990		
Gopal Singh, Governor of Arunachal Pradesh	17 March 1990 – 8 May 1990		
D. D. Thakur, Governor of Arunachal Pradesh	9 May 1990 – 16 March 1991		
Loknath Misra, Governor of Arunachal Pradesh	17 March 1991 – 25 March 1991		
S. N. Dwivedy, Governor of Arunachal Pradesh	26 March 1991 – 4 July 1993		
Madhukar Dighe, Governor of Arunachal Pradesh	5 July 1993 – 20 October 1993		
Mata Prasad, Governor of Arunachal Pradesh	21 October 1993 – 16 May 1999		
S. K. Sinha, Governor of Arunachal Pradesh	17 May 1999 – 1 August 1999		
Arvind Dave, Governor of Arunachal Pradesh	2 August 1999 – 12 June 2003		
Vinod Chandra Pande, Governor of Arunachal Pradesh	13 June 2003 – 15 December 2004		
S. K. Singh, Governor of Arunachal Pradesh	16 December 2004 – 26 January 2008		
Gen. (Retd.) J. J. Singh, Governor of Arunachal Pradesh	27 January 2008 – 28 May 2013		
Lt. Gen. (Retd.) Nirbhay Sharma, Governor of Arunachal Pradesh	29 May 2013 – 12 May 2015		
Air Marshal (Retd.) Pranab Kumar Barbora	13 May 2015 – Present	Lt Gen Kaiwalya Trivikram Parnaik	13 May 2015 – Present

== Location ==
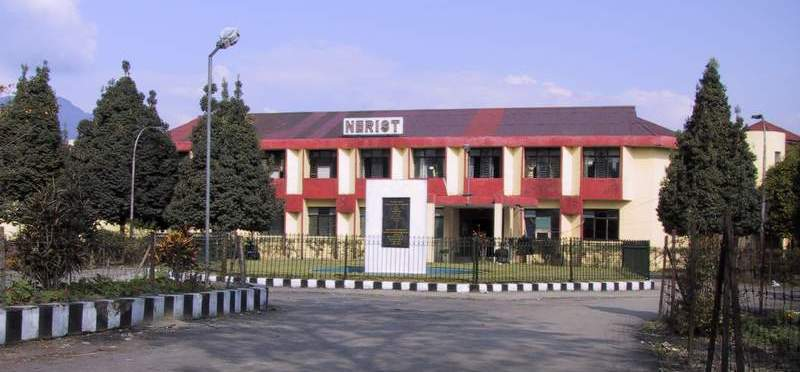
Academic block, Nirjuli

NERIST is located in Nirjuli in the Papum Pare district of Arunachal Pradesh at the foothills of Eastern Himalaya. It is 19 Km from Itanagar, the capital of Arunachal Pradesh, on National Highway 52A between Banderdewa and Itanagar. It is 10 km from Banderdewa - the border between Assam and Arunachal Pradesh, and about 390 km from Guwahati. The institute lies in the Capital-complex, consisting of (Itanagar, Naharlagun, Nurjuli and Banderdewa) and is accessible by road to the neighbouring cities of Assam.

== Campus ==
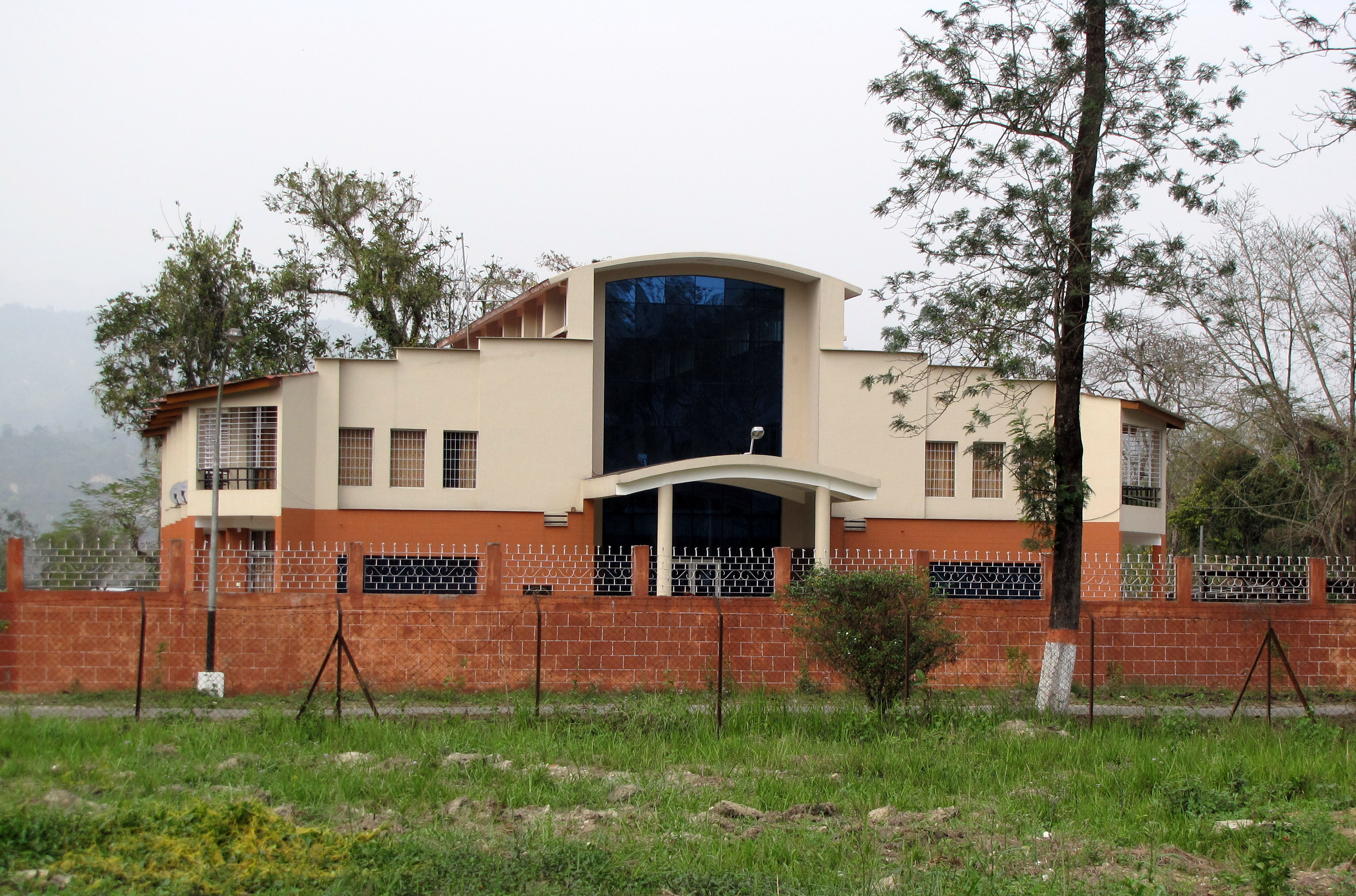
NERIST Guesthouse

The national highway NH52 divides the NERIST campus into two. The institute is fully residential, and is spread over 500 acres of land. There are ten hostel blocks with a capacity of 1500 boarders; seven of these houses male undergraduate students, one postgraduate male students and research scholars and the other two for female students. The campus has faculty and staff quarters, Medical Health Unit, Post office, guest houses, Kendriya Vidyalaya, KG School, several cooperative stores, parks, temple, mosque, church, namghar and an SBI bank branch with two atm outlets.

== Organisation ==
The institute is managed by a Board of Management, comprising representatives of MHRD, the eight beneficiary states of the North Eastern region, AICTE and educationists. The state governor of Arunachal Pradesh is the de facto head of the highest body, NERIST Society, which consists of education ministers of all North Eastern States. The Board of Management is headed by the director of Indian Institute of Technology Guwahati, Gautam Baruah. The board appoints a well-known academic, generally from north east India, as director of NERIST.

Each discipline has its own head of department, generally the most senior of the professors. The dean(s) for Student Affairs, Academic, Planning & Development and the Registrar oversee all other major activities.

The HMC is the house of management of all the hostels headed by the HMC chairperson. In addition to this, the administration is also run by the incharge/chairperson of Training and Placement (T&P) Cell, Education Technology (ET) Cell, Sports, Security, NCC/NSS unit, NERIST Entrance Examinations (NEE), Transport and Telecom.

== Academic structure ==
The academic programme in Engineering and Technology is 2 modules for those who join after class 10 by NEE-1 exam.These 2 modules — called base module for 2 years and then 4 years degree course. Students who join by virtue of NEE-2 or JEE Mains exam, enroll for a 4 years degree programme. Each module has an entry point through an entrance examination conducted by NERIST. One can also enter after passing diploma (through NEE-3 exam) to complete a 3 years degree course.

Each module provides terminality corresponding to an occupational level and, at the same time, allows entry to the next higher module, leading to a degree in engineering and technology in about six years after class X. In the Applied Science stream, a two-year Base module and four year Degree module are offered. The system allows lateral entry from outside, at the beginning of each module.

The Certificate and the Diploma levels emphasize the practical aspects of engineering, which help an individual become an entrepreneur or to face the day–to–day problems of industry. The Degree curriculum provides instruction not only in engineering but emphasizes management and entrepreneurship aspects as well.

=== Departments ===
The institute offers B.Tech., B.Sc., Diploma, Certificate, Management and Postgraduate programmes under following departments.

- Agricultural Engineering
- Civil Engineering
- Computer Science and Engineering
- Electrical Engineering
- Electronics and Communication Engineering
- Forestry and Life Sciences
- Mechanical Engineering

Besides the departments of core engineering and applied science disciplines, NERIST administers the following centres established within the institute -

- Centre of Appropriate Technology and Rural Development
- Centre for Management Studies

Besides, there are some departments that are auxiliary and do provide postgraduate courses viz Chemistry, Mathematics and Physics.

=== Library ===
The institute has a library system which consists of a Central library and 11 departmental libraries supporting the teaching, research and extension programme throughout the academic year. The students, faculties, employees are issued library card for issuing books from the central library. The library has a wide collection of books on engineering subjects and basic sciences. There are also collections for journals and novels.

Book Bank: In addition to the library system, the institute is having a book bank facility for the students from where every student get a set of useful text books related to the academic syllabus of that particular semester. The books bank was funded by North East Council (NEC) initially; later NERIST provided the useful funds for upgrading and enhancing the collection of books.

=== Admission ===
NERIST conducts the NERIST Entrance Exam (NEE) to select students for admission to Certificate, Diploma and Degree programmes. Three examinations, known as NEE-I, NEE-II and NEE-III, are held to take admissions at three levels. The NEE-I, for which eligibility is a pass in Class X, is held towards the end of April every year for admissions to the Base Module. NEE-II is for the lateral entry to the Diploma Module of Engineering and to the Degree Module of Applied Science stream and NEE-III is for the lateral entry to the Degree Module of Engineering. The notifications for NEE-I, II and III are published in most regional and national newspapers. NEEs are conducted in centers in the North Eastern States of India.

Of the seats in each of the modules for direct admission, 80% of seats are reserved for the candidates of the eight states of the North East India (10% each) as states' quota. 7% of seats are filled up from the students of North East on merit. 10% of the seats are filled up by the candidates from rest of the States under the All India (AI) quota. 3% of the seats are reserved for physically handicapped candidates with 40-75% locomotor disability.

Admission to the postgraduate programmes in technology is based on the performance of candidates in all India-level entrance examination GATE conducted by the IITs on behalf of the MHRD, Government of India. Separate entrance tests are conducted for admission to other postgraduate programmes.

== Placement ==
=== Placement details ( under graduate) ===
Academic Year	No. of students placed		Median salary of placed graduates(Amount in Rs.)
2015-16			
2016-17			
2017-18			
2018-19	97	212	400000(Four Lakhs)
2019-20	92	158	350000(Three Lakhs and Fifty Thousand)
2020-21	65	160	360000(Three Lakhs and Sixty Thousand)

== Campus activities ==
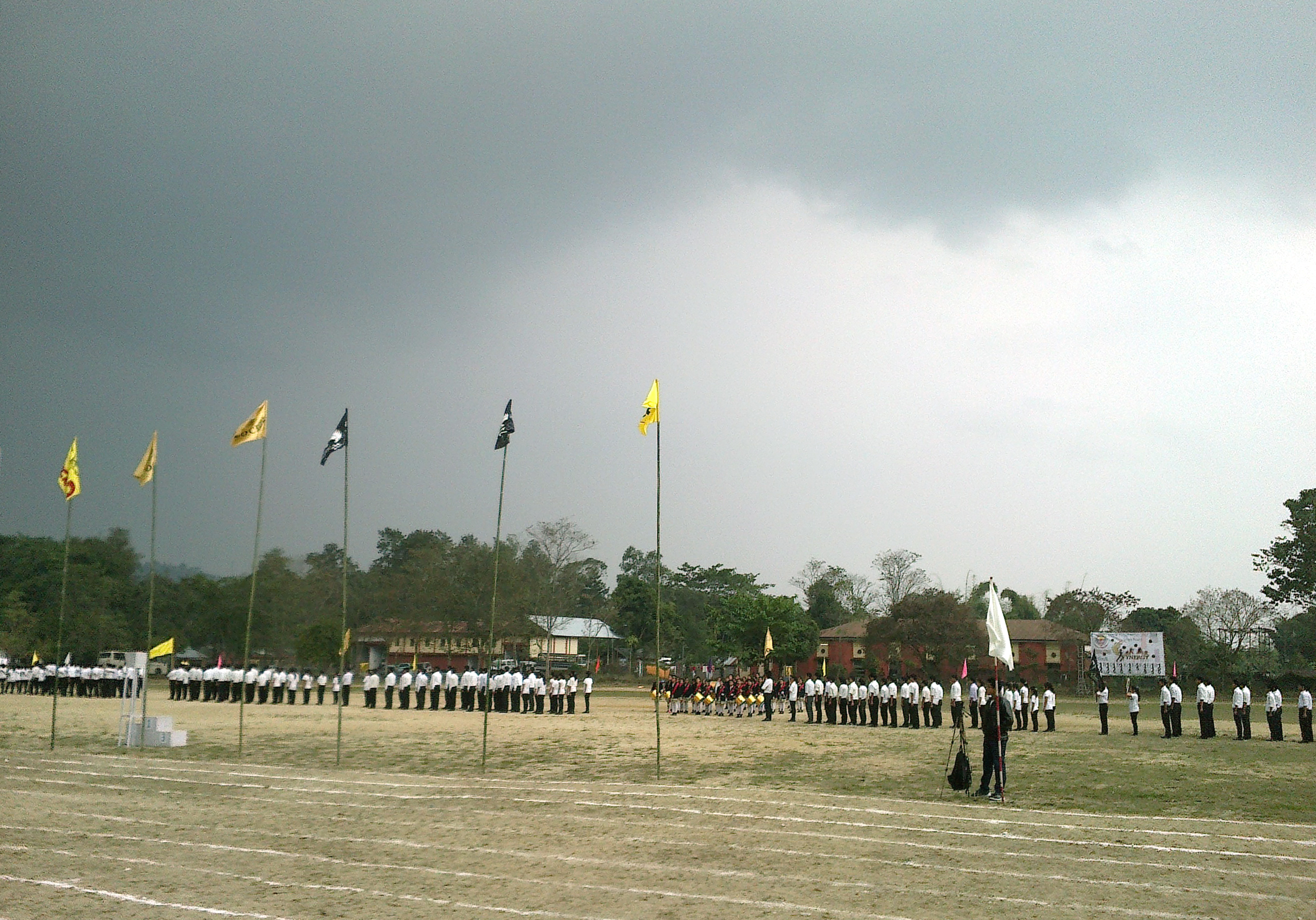
Synergy 2012

A student or an alumnus of NERIST is known as a NERISTian. The Recreational and Creative Activities Forum (RACAF) organises Sonabyss - a four-day annual cultural fest around October. Synergy is the annual athletic meet held in January or February when track and field athletic events are held. Football and cricket are the two most popular sports among the NERISTians.

During the three-day annual techno-management event Shristi, institutes are invited from all over north-eastern India. Shristi started as the technical-festival of NERIST in 2005 which has become the techno-management festival after the commencement of Management Studies at the institute. Shristi hosts events to build the interest of the audience in higher studies, including events for school children.

NERIST bears National Cadet Corps (NCC) and National Service Scheme (NSS) units. NCC cadets regularly parade on Indian Independence Day and Republic Day. NSS is a community service programme sponsored by the Indian Government. Groups participating in NSS conduct mass awareness and social welfare programmes.
