= National Highway 515 (India) =

National highway in India

National Highway 515
- Map of National Highway 515 in red

Route information
- Length: 111 km (69 mi)

Major junctions
- From: Kulajan, Assam
- To: Pasighat, Kulajan

Location
- Country: India
- States: Assam, Arunachal Pradesh
- Primary destinations: Jonai

Highway system
- Roads in India; Expressways; National; State; Asian
← NH 51	→ NH 52A

National Highway 515 (NH 515) is a National Highway in the Northeastern Indian states of Assam and Arunachal Pradesh. NH 515 starts from Kulajan at the intersection of NH 15 north of Dhemaji and generally traverses east and northeast. It runs for a distance of 111 km (69 mi), initially through Assam and the rest in Arunachal Pradesh.

== See also ==
- List of national highways in India
- National Highways Development Project
