= Bame =

Bame or BAME may refer to:

- Black, Asian and minority ethnic, a UK demographic
- Bamê, a village in China
- Bame, in the list of cities and towns in Arunachal Pradesh
- Bame Monrovia, a football club in Liberia

== See also ==
- Boehm, in American English, usually pronounced similarly: US: /beɪm/.
