= Kulajan =

- Town
- Kulajan
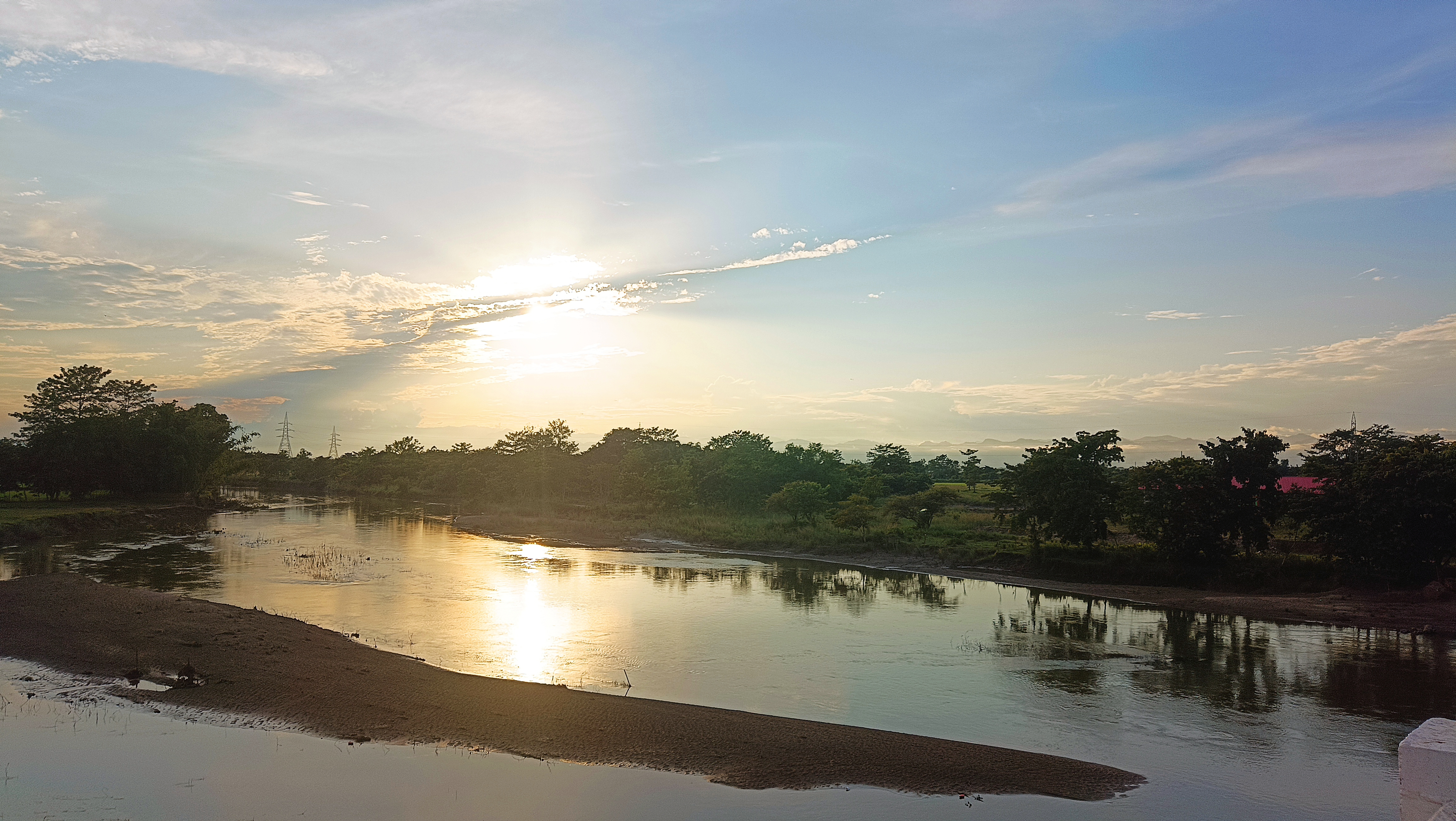
- Interactive map of Kulajan
- Country: India
- State: Assam
- District: Dhemaji
- Co-district: Jonai

Government
  - Type: MLA, MP
  - Body: Mising Autonomous Council
- Time zone: UTC+05:30 (Asia/Kolkata)

Kulajan is a small town in Dhemaji district of the Indian state of Assam. The town is situated on the northern bank of the Brahmaputra River. National Highway 515 (India) starts from Kulajan and ends at Pasighat.

Kulajan is the gateway to Northern Assam from Southern Assam connecting both regions by the Bogibeel Bridge.

== History ==
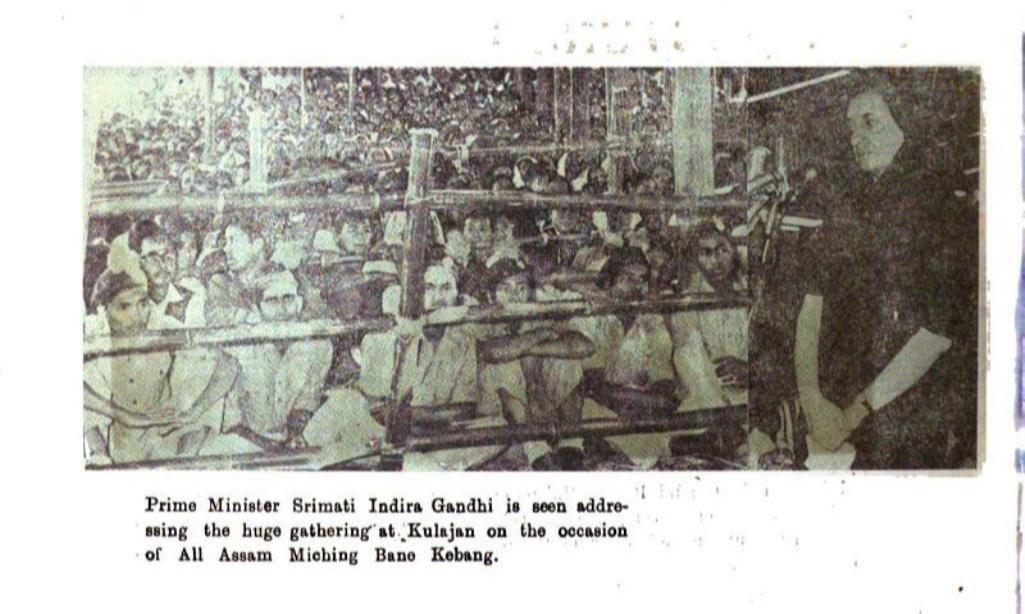
Former PM Indira Gandhi addressed a huge gathering at Kulajan on the 42nd General Conference of the Mising Bane Kebang in 1966.

In 1966, the 42nd General Conference of the Mising Bane Kebang(Greater Assembly of the Misings), was held in Kulajan. The Prime Minister of India of that time Mrs.Indira Gandhi attended the Conference as the Chief Guest. In this conference, the Kebang informed the Prime Minister mainly about the Mising tribe such as how they celebrate the festival Ali Ai Ligang, their traditional food and cuisine, their language, their attires, religion and belief system. And their role in contributing to the culture and traditions of Assam.

In this Conference, people of Mising Community as well as other communities of the district participated The special thing to be note about this conference was that the Kebang agreed to open the position of President, Secretary of the Kebang as well as the others positions to participants from Non-Mising People.

== People ==
Kulajan is mostly inhabited by the Mising, an indigenous Assamese ethnic group in Assam. About 95% of inhabitants are Mising community and only 5% belong to other communities according to 2011 Census of India. Ali Ai Ligang is a local festival. On that day they prepare a local homemade rice beer known as Apong, available in two varieties i.e. Nogin and Po: Ro. Also they serve their guests with purang apin, pe:red oying and adin ba:nam (roasted pork). On the eve of Ali Ai Ligang, the Mising girls and boys dress in traditional dress. The festival is celebrated with performing dance and singing Mising Folk songs. Other festivals like Dobur and Porag are mostly celebrated along with the national festival of the indigenous Assamese communities, i.e. Bihu and other festivals such as Durga Puja, Lakshmi Puja, Diwali, etc. Agriculture, handloom weaving and services are the main source of earning among the people here.

== Banking services ==
State Bank of India( Kulajan Branch).

== Politics ==
Kulajan is part of Lakhimpur (Lok Sabha constituency). Mr.Pradan Baruah from BJP is the present MP from this constituency. in Assam. As of 2021, Mr.Bhubon Pegu of BJP is the MLA of Kulajan, part of 114 Jonai (ST) Vidhan Sabha.

== Education ==
=== Schools ===
- Kulajan High School—Assamese Medium School, Located at Kulajan, Established in 1994
- Baptist Senior Secondary School—English Medium School, located at Kulajan, Established in 1995
- Kulajan Senior Secondary School, Kulajan
- Kulajan Lower Primary School, Kulajan
- Kanduli Mathura LP School, Kulajan Mathura
- Kulajan ME School, Kulajan

=== Colleges ===
- Kulajan College, Kulajan

== Transportation ==
Kulajan is well connected to the other parts of the states. National Highway 515 (India) which starts from Kulajan, it connects Towns and Cities of Assam and Arunachal Pradesh's and National Highway 15 (India) also passes through Kulajan is connected to Dibrugarh. Mohanbari airport which is located in Dibrugarh district is the nearest airport.

== See also ==
Tangani railway station
Kulajan High School
Likabali
