= National Highway 15 (India) =

National highway in India

National Highway 15
- Map of National Highway 15 in red

Route information
- Length: 664 km (413 mi)

Major junctions
- West end: NH 27 in Baihata
- List: NH 715A in Dalgaon; NH 715 in Tezpur; NH 415 in Gohpur; NH 415 in Banderdeva; NH 515 in Kulajan; NH 2 in Dibrugarh; NH 315A in Tinsukia; NH 315 in Makum; NH 115 in Kakopathar; NH 215 in Nodhing
- East end: NH 13 in Wakro

Location
- Country: India
- States: Assam, Arunachal Pradesh

Highway system
- Roads in India; Expressways; National; State; Asian
| ← NH 14 | → NH 16 |

National Highway 15 (NH 15) is a National Highway in India.

The highway originates from Baihata in Kamrup District of Assam and terminates at Wakro in Lohit district of Arunachal Pradesh. It traverse through Mangaldai, Dhekiajuli, Tezpur, Banderdeva, North Lakhimpur, Kulajan, Dibrugarh, Tinsukia and Namsai.
