= Kimin =

- Town
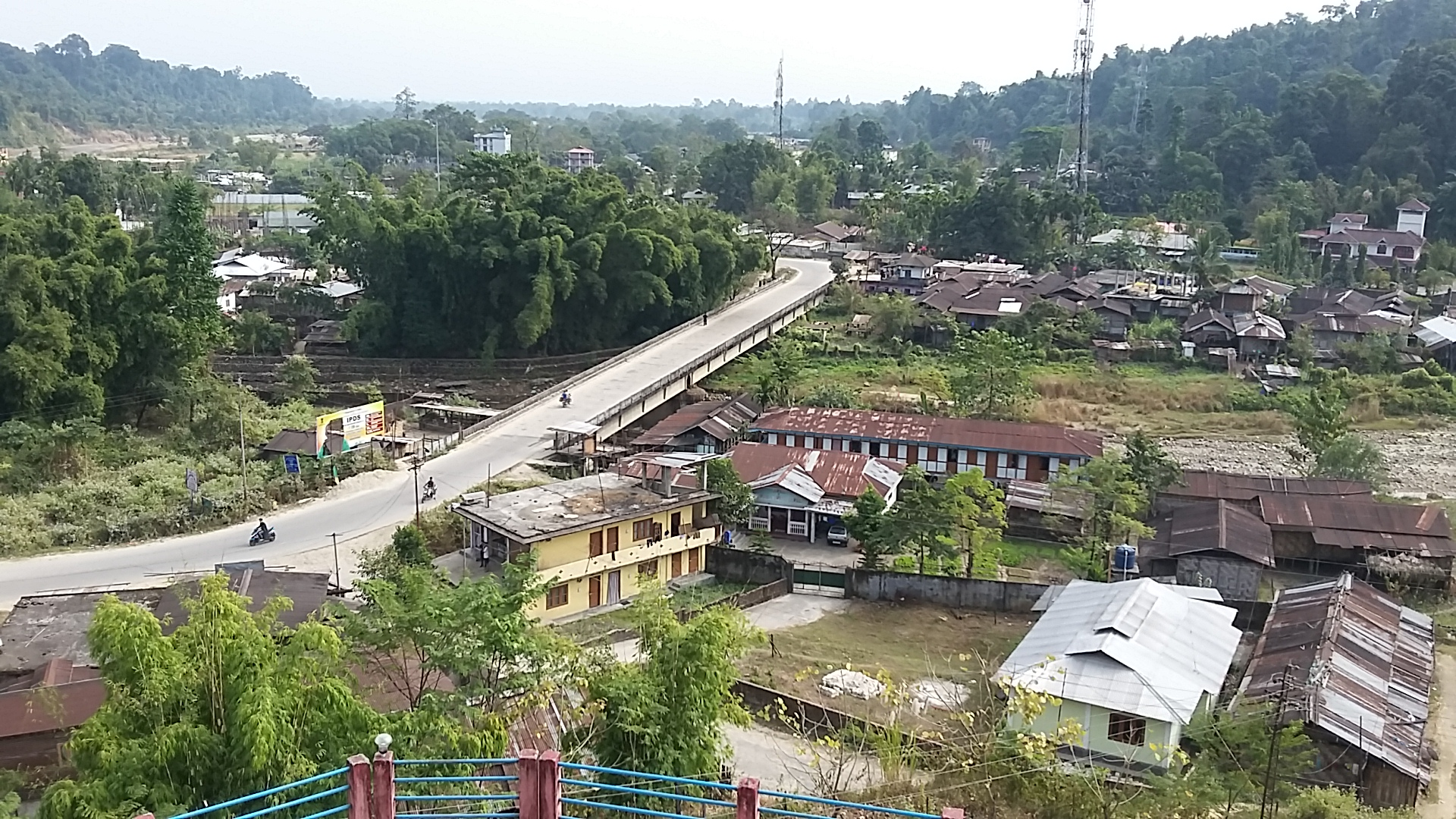
- View of Kimin town from the Inspection bungalow

- Location in Arunachal Pradesh, India Kimin (India)
- Coordinates: 27°18′16.3″N 93°58′07.6″E
- Country: India
- State: Arunachal Pradesh
- District: Papum Pare

Area
  - Total: 321 km^{2} (124 sq mi)

Language
  - Official: English
- Time zone: UTC+5:30 (IST)
- PIN: 791121
- Telephone code: 0360
- Vehicle registration: AR-01, 02

Kimin is a populated place in the Papum Pare district of Arunachal Pradesh, India. It is centre of one of the nine administrative circles of the district. It is located at a distance of approximately 80 kilometres from Itanagar, the capital of Arunachal Pradesh. There is no train station nearby the closest one is at Naharlagun and Domestic airport is Lilabari (Also in North Lakhimpur), which falls in state of Assam. Drive time will take 30mins approx. Good hotels are scarce in Kimin, though good food are available in plenty. Hindi is widely spoken here. Ideal time to visit Kimin is August to February, when the weather becomes very pleasant.

Road Distance or driving distance from Guwahati to Kimin is 385 km (239.00 miles).

The first administrative centre in the Papum Pare district was opened at Kimin in 1947.

== Languages ==
There is no language spoken here as they speak the dialects which usually don't have any script. Nyishi is the widely spoken dialect here. Apart from that, people speak English (Official language), Hindi, Assamese. No other languages are spoken here.
