= National Highway 315A (India) =

National highway in India

National Highway 315A
- Map of National Highway 315A in red

Route information
- Length: 99 km (62 mi)

Major junctions
- South end: Khonsa, Arunachal Pradesh
- North end: Tinsukia, Assam

Location
- Country: India
- States: Arunachal Pradesh, Assam

Highway system
- Roads in India; Expressways; National; State; Asian
← NH 15	→ NH 215

National Highway 315A (NH 315A) is a National Highway in North East India that connects Khonsa in Arunachal Pradesh and Tinsukia in Assam.

== Route ==
Tinsukia - Naharkatia - Hukanjuri - Khonsa.

== Junctions ==
- Junction with National Highway 15 near Tinsukia.
- Junction with National Highway 215 near Khonsa.

== See also ==
- List of national highways in India
- National Highways Development Project
