= National Institute of Technology, Arunachal Pradesh =

Public engineering institution in India

Coordinates: 27°09′N 93°43′E

National Institute of Technology Arunachal Pradesh
- Motto: न हि ज्ञानेन सदृशं पवित्रमिह विद्यते
- Motto in English: Certainly there is no purifier in this world like Knowledge
- Type: Public
- Established: 2010; 16 years ago
- Chairperson: Ramesh Kumar Saraogi
- Director: Mohan V. Aware
- Location: Jote, Arunachal Pradesh, India
- Campus: Rural
- Acronym: NITAP
- Website: www.nitap.ac.in

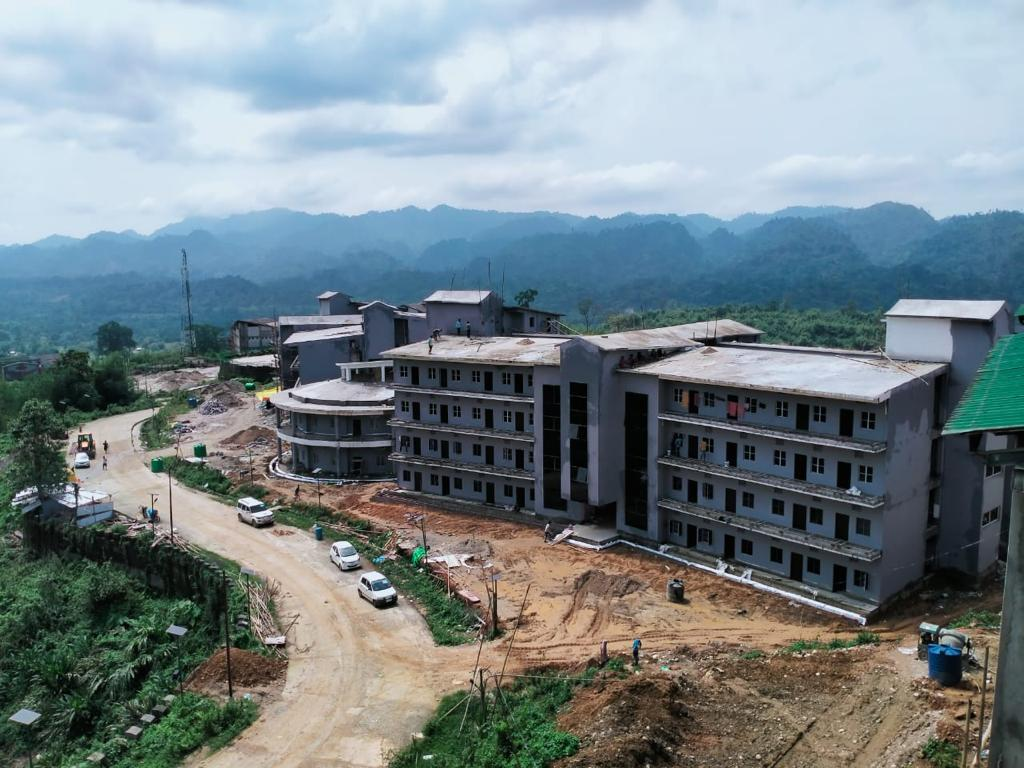
NIT Arunachal Pradesh (Permanent Campus)

National Institute of Technology Arunachal Pradesh (also known as NIT Arunachal Pradesh or NITAP) is a public technical and research institute located at Jote near Itanagar, the capital of Arunachal Pradesh. NIT Arunachal Pradesh is one of the 31 National Institutes of Technology in India and is recognized as an Institute of National Importance. NIT Arunachal Pradesh started its functioning from 2010 in a temporary campus in Yupia, Arunachal Pradesh. The institute presently functions from its permanent Campus at Jote, Papum Pare district, Arunachal Pradesh.

== History ==
The Indian government started 14 RECs between 1959 and 1965, at Bhopal, Allahabad, Calicut, Durgapur, Kurukshetra, Jamshedpur, Jaipur, Nagpur, Rourkela, Srinagar, Surathkal, Surat, Tiruchirappalli, and Warangal). It established one in Silchar in 1967 and added two others located at Hamirpur in 1986, and Jalandhar in 1987.

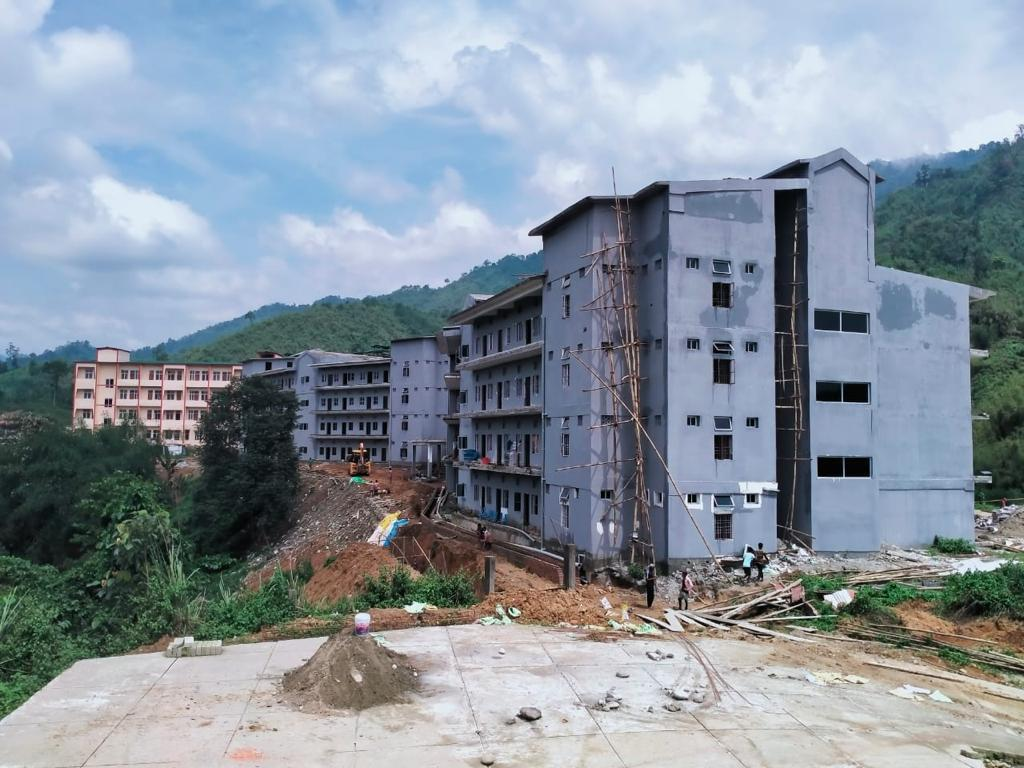
BOYS HOSTEL

The RECs were jointly operated by the central government and the concerned state government. Non-recurring expenditures and expenditures for post-graduate courses during the REC period were borne by the central government, while recurring expenditure on undergraduate courses was shared equally by central and state governments.

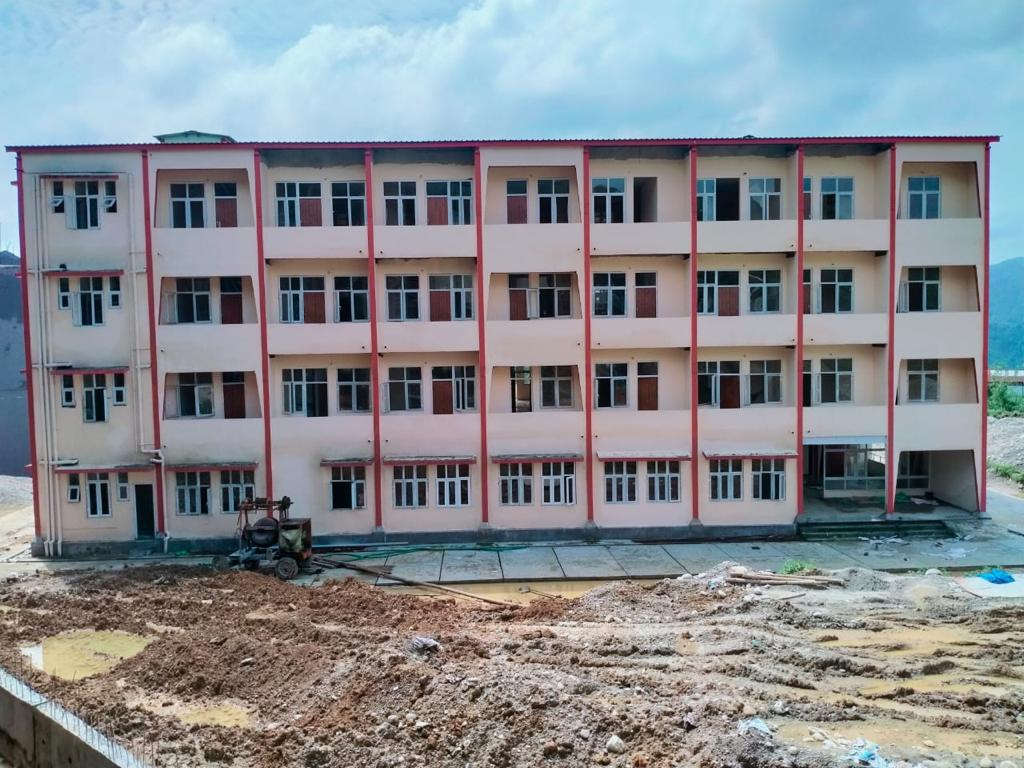
Girl's Hostel

Due to the costs and infrastructure involved in creating the Indian Institutes of Technology (IIT), in 2002 MHRD Minister Murli Manohar Joshi upgraded RECs to "National Institutes of Technology" (NITs) instead of creating IITs. The central government controls NITs and provides all funding. In 2003, all RECs became NITs.

The upgrade was designed along the lines of the Indian Institutes of Technology (IITs) after it was concluded that RECs had potential as proven by the success of their alumni and their contributions in the field of technical education. Subsequently, funding and autonomy for NITs increased. The changes implemented recommendations of the "High Powered Review Committee" (HPRC). The HPRC, chaired by Dr. R.A. Mashelkar, submitted its report entitled "Strategic Road Map for Academic Excellence of Future RECs" in 1998.

In 2004, MHRD issued NIT status to three more colleges, located at Patna (Bihar Engineering College - a 110-year-old college), Raipur (Government Engineering College), and Agartala (Tripura Engineering College). Based on the request of state governments and feasibility, future NITs are either converted from existing institutes or can be freshly created. The 21st (and the first brand-new) NIT is planned for Imphal in the north-eastern state of Manipur at an initial cost of Rs. 500 crores. In 2010, the government announced setting up ten new NITs in the remaining states/territories. This would lead to every state in India having its own NIT.

Union Cabinet has approved 10 new NITs in India. NIT, Arunachal Pradesh is one of those new NITs to be mentored by NIT, Durgapur. The institute presently functions from his permanent Campus at Jote, Papum Pare district of Arunachal Pradesh. Itanagar, the capital of Arunachal Pradesh is situated in the same district. An all-weather road to the other parts of the country connects Jote.

== Campus ==
=== Location ===
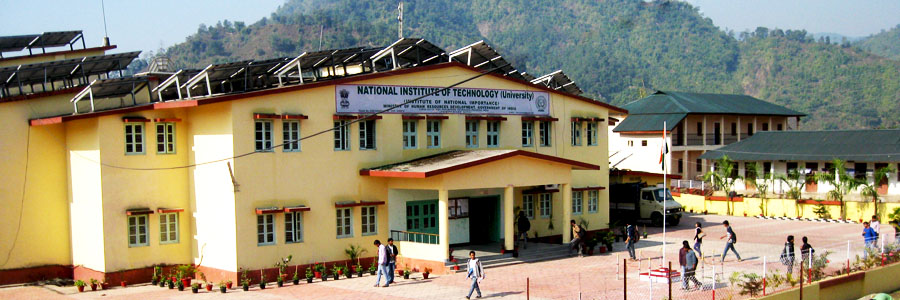
NIT Arunachal Pradesh old temporary campus at Yupia

NIT Arunachal Pradesh is located at Jote, 30 kilometers from Itanagar, which is the capital town of Arunachal Pradesh and 360 kilometers from Guwahati. Jote is surrounded by beautiful green forest and mountains. The picturesque and surrounding of Jote makes it ideal for a noble academic environment.

=== Facilities ===
The facilities and services that NITAP renders to the students, faculty members and staff make it stand among the top level institutes. The amenities provided to the students make the stay in NITAP a good experience. The presence of basic facilities such as 24 X 7 availability water and electricity and a variety of food for different taste. The institute and hostels are equipped with Wifi and LAN facility.

NIT Arunachal Pradesh is a fully residential campus. There are two hostels for boys, namely papum boys hostel, Lohit 2 boys hostel dividing Lohit hostel for girls which is the sole hostel for girls in the college. The mess is run privately. Each hostel is under the care hostel warden.

Only 1 bus is available for travel from hostel to classes.

== Organisation and administration ==
=== Functioning ===
NIT Arunachal is an autonomous technical institute. It functions under the Ministry of Education.

=== Administration ===
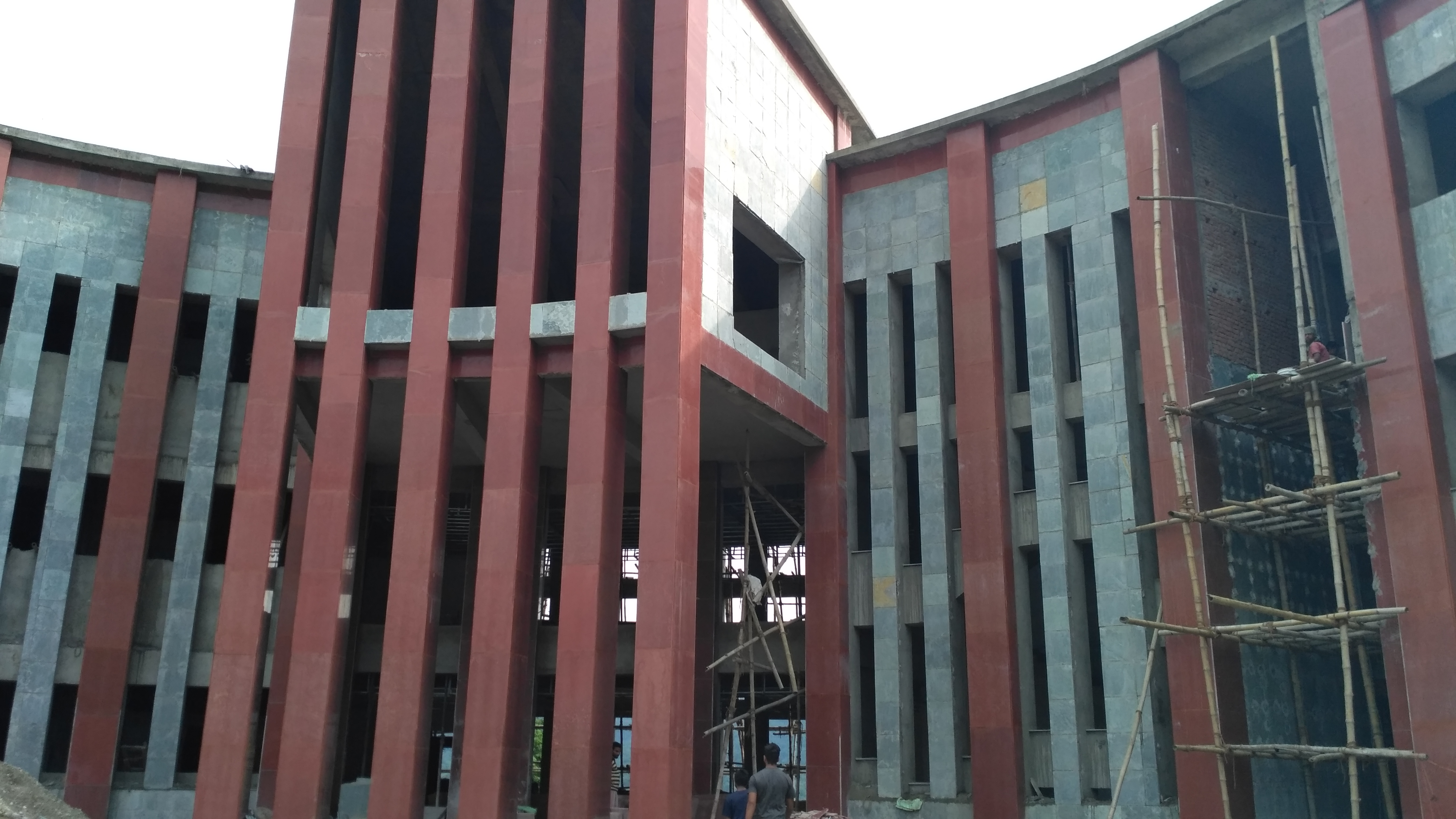
The Administrative Block under construction in permanent campus

Under the constitution of the National Institutes of Technology Act 2007, the president of India is the visitor to the institute. The authorities of the institute are Board of Governors and the Senate. The board is headed by the chairman, who is appointed by the visitor. The director, who is the secretary of the board, looks after the day-to-day running of the institute. The Board of Governors has nominees of the central government, the state government, the NIT Council and the institute Senate.

=== Departments ===
- Department of Basic and Applied Science
- Department of Biotechnology Engineering
- Department of Chemical Engineering
- Department of Civil Engineering
- Department of Computer Science and Engineering
- Department of Electrical Engineering
- Department of Electronics and Communication Engineering
- Department of Mechanical Engineering
- Department of Management and Humanities

== Academics ==
=== Admissions ===
Students are taken in for the undergraduate courses through the Joint Entrance Examination (JEE) conducted by National Testing Agency (NTA).

The institute awards B.Tech. degrees in engineering. Admission to the programs is through a Joint Entrance Examination (JEE). NIT-AP follows the reservation policy declared by the Supreme Court of India, by which 27% of seats are reserved for Other Backward Classes (OBCs), 15% for Scheduled Castes (SCs), and 7.5% for Scheduled Tribes (STs). The institute accepts foreign nationals through scholarships awarded by the government of India, and non-resident Indians through an independent scheme known as Direct Admission for Students Abroad (DASA).[9][10]

The B.Tech. program is a four-year program while the B.Arch. program is five years long. The first year of the B.Tech. program follows a common curriculum.

Admission to the graduate M.Tech. and PhD courses are primarily based on scores in the GATE exam, conducted by the IITs. Admission to the MS programme is done through the CCMN conducted by the NITs.

=== Rankings ===
University and college rankings

Engineering – India
- NIRF (2022): 126

The National Institutional Ranking Framework (NIRF) ranked it 171 among engineering colleges in 2022.

== Student life ==
=== Cultural events ===
ATULYAM is the Annual Cultural Festival of NIT Arunachal Pradesh. The first cultural festival ATULYAM was held on 3–4 October 2013. There are 23 events in eight categories including Flash Mob, theatrics, creat_ev_villaze, Viking zone, rhythm on the floor, literature, sports and Mr. & Ms. Atulyam.

=== Technical Festival ADDOVEDI ===
Addovedi is the annual intercollege technical festival organized by the students of NIT Arunachal Pradesh. It is the first dedicated technical festival organized by a university in Arunachal Pradesh. The third edition of the festival was organized from the 30th to 1 November 2015.

=== Social activity ROSHNI ===
Roshni is a social activity for the deprived people of the Arunachal Pradesh. It helps the people of Arunachal Pradesh with social activities, especially in education development and awareness. It is run by the students.

=== Publication ===
Dept.of EEE has taken an initiative by publishing the first ever magazine Vidyut Sanchaar ' of NIT Arunachal Pradesh.
