= Rohini Heliport =

Heliport in North Delhi, India

Coordinates: 28.75°N 77.05°E

- IATA: none; ICAO: none

Summary
- Airport type: Heliport
- Owner: Pawan Hans Limited
- Operator: Pawan Hans Limited
- Serves: Delhi NCR
- Location: Sector 36, Rohini, Delhi, India
- Elevation AMSL: 712 ft / 217 m
- Website: https://www.pawanhans.co.in/english/inner.aspx?status=3&menu_id=51

Map
- Located in Rohini, Delhi, India Rohini Heliport (India)

Helipads
Number	Length		Surface
Number	ft	m	Surface
			Concrete

Rohini Heliport is a heliport located at Sector 36, Rohini, Delhi, India. The first heliport in India, it was inaugurated on 28 February 2017. Following its proposal by the Ministry of Civil Aviation, it was approved under the Master Plan of Delhi.

== About ==
The Rohini Heliport, owned by Pawan Hans Limited, is the first of its kind in the country. The heliport is spread over 25 acres at a site a few kilometers away from the Rithala metro station in north-west Delhi. It consists of a terminal building having a capacity of 150 passengers, 4 hangars with a parking capacity of 16 helicopters, and 9 parking bays. The facility has a separate air traffic control (ATC), fire and fuelling services. It is home to a maintenance, repair and overhaul (MRO) facility for usage by the Pawan Hans fleet, as well as for third-party maintenance work.

== Construction ==
The Rohini Heliport was constructed by Ahmedabad-based Dineshchandra R. Agrawal Infracon Private Limited (DRA Infracon) at a cost of around ₹100 crores.

The Ministry of Environment accorded in-principle approval to the proposal in June 2011.

== See also ==
- Transport in Delhi
