= 2011 Pawan Hans Mi-17 crash =

Aviation accident in India

Coordinates: 27°35′18″N 91°51′55″E

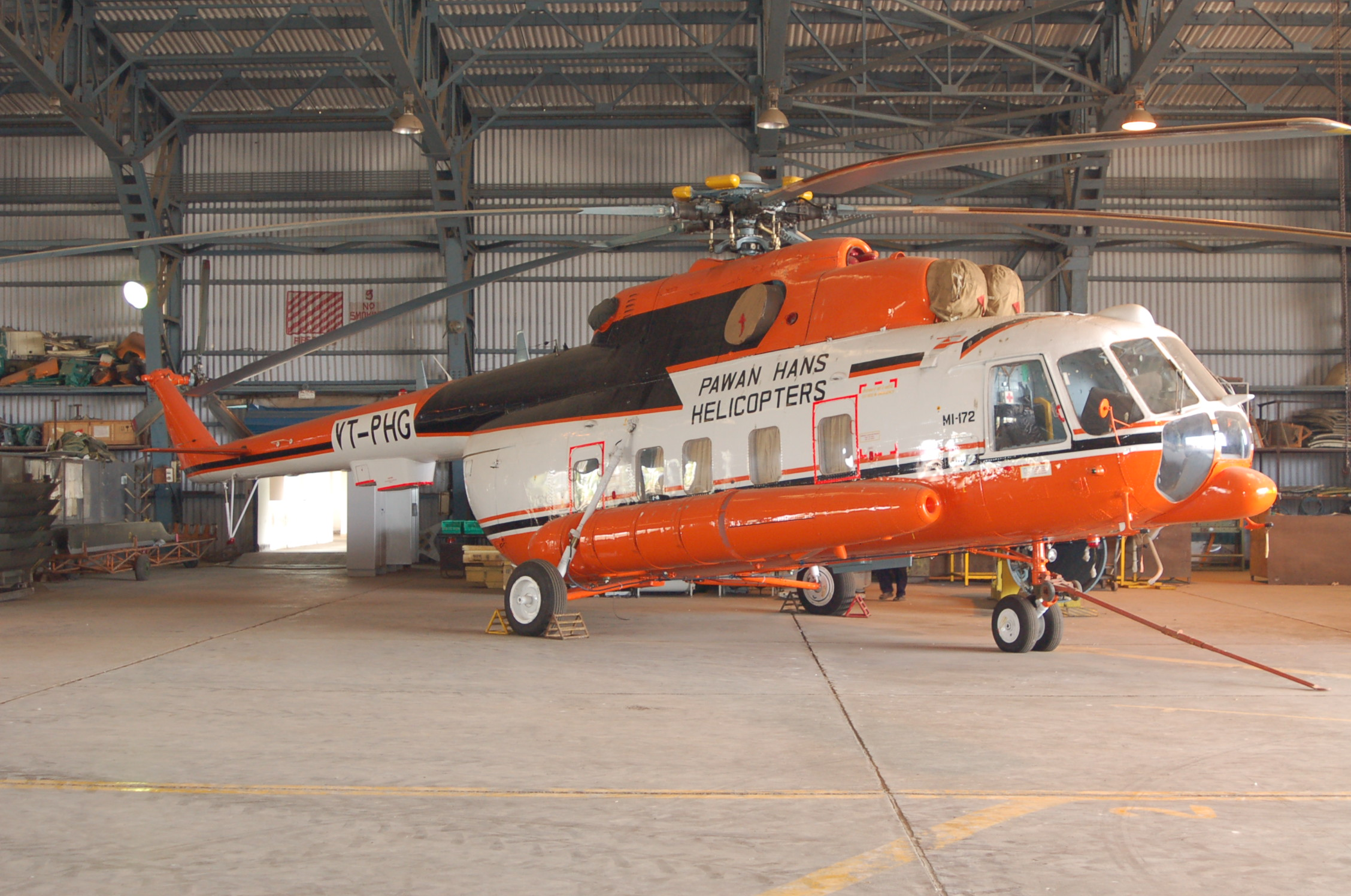
- A Mi-17 of Pawan Hans similar to the one involved

Accident
- Date: 19 April 2011
- Summary: Helipad undershoot and subsequent main rotor breaking.
- Site: Near Tawang, India

Aircraft
- Aircraft type: Mil Mi-17
- Operator: Pawan Hans
- Registration: VT-PHF
- Flight origin: Lokpriya Gopinath Bordoloi International Airport, Borjhar, India
- Destination: Tawang, India
- Occupants: 23
- Passengers: 18
- Crew: 5
- Fatalities: 17
- Survivors: 6

On 19 April 2011, a Mil Mi-17 helicopter operated by Pawan Hans crashed near the town of Tawang, India,; 17 of 23 people on board died.

== Accident ==
The helicopter had taken off at 12:45 pm from Borjhar Airport in Assam on an internal flight to the town of Tawang, in Tawang district, India. On board were 18 passengers and 5 crew. At around 13:50 pm, the helicopter arrived at destination, but while attempting to land at Tawang Civil helipad, which is located on top of a hill, the Mi-17 crashed into a gorge and caught fire.

== Aircraft ==
The aircraft involved, a Mil Mi-17, registered VT-PHF, was also involved in a previous emergency landing in the same region.

== Casualties ==
Seventeen of the 23 on board died, including three crew members. Out of the 17, two were minors. Two passengers survived the crash initially, but later died due to injuries from the post-crash fire.

== Investigation ==
An official in the Directorate General of Civil Aviation (DGCA) said that as per initial reports the helicopter crash-landed "due to likely wind shear and downdraft while landing and caught fire on impact to the ground".
