= Pawan Hans =

Indian PSU and Airline

Pawan Hans Limited
IATA	ICAO	Call sign
—	PHE	PAWAN HANS
- Founded: 15 October 1985; 40 years ago (as Helicopter Corporation of India)
- Commenced operations: 1 November 1985; 40 years ago
- Hubs: Juhu Aerodrome, Mumbai
- Secondary hubs: Rohini Heliport, Delhi
- Fleet size: 47
- Parent company: Ministry of Civil Aviation, Government of India
- Headquarters: Sector-1, Noida, Uttar Pradesh, India
- Revenue: ▲₹372.90 crore (US$39 million)(2020–21)
- Operating income: ▲₹−18.71 crore (US$−1.9 million)(2020-21)
- Net income: ▲₹−886.59 lakh (US$−920,000)(2020-21)
- Employees: 569 (31 March 2023)
- Website: www.pawanhans.co.in/english/index.aspx

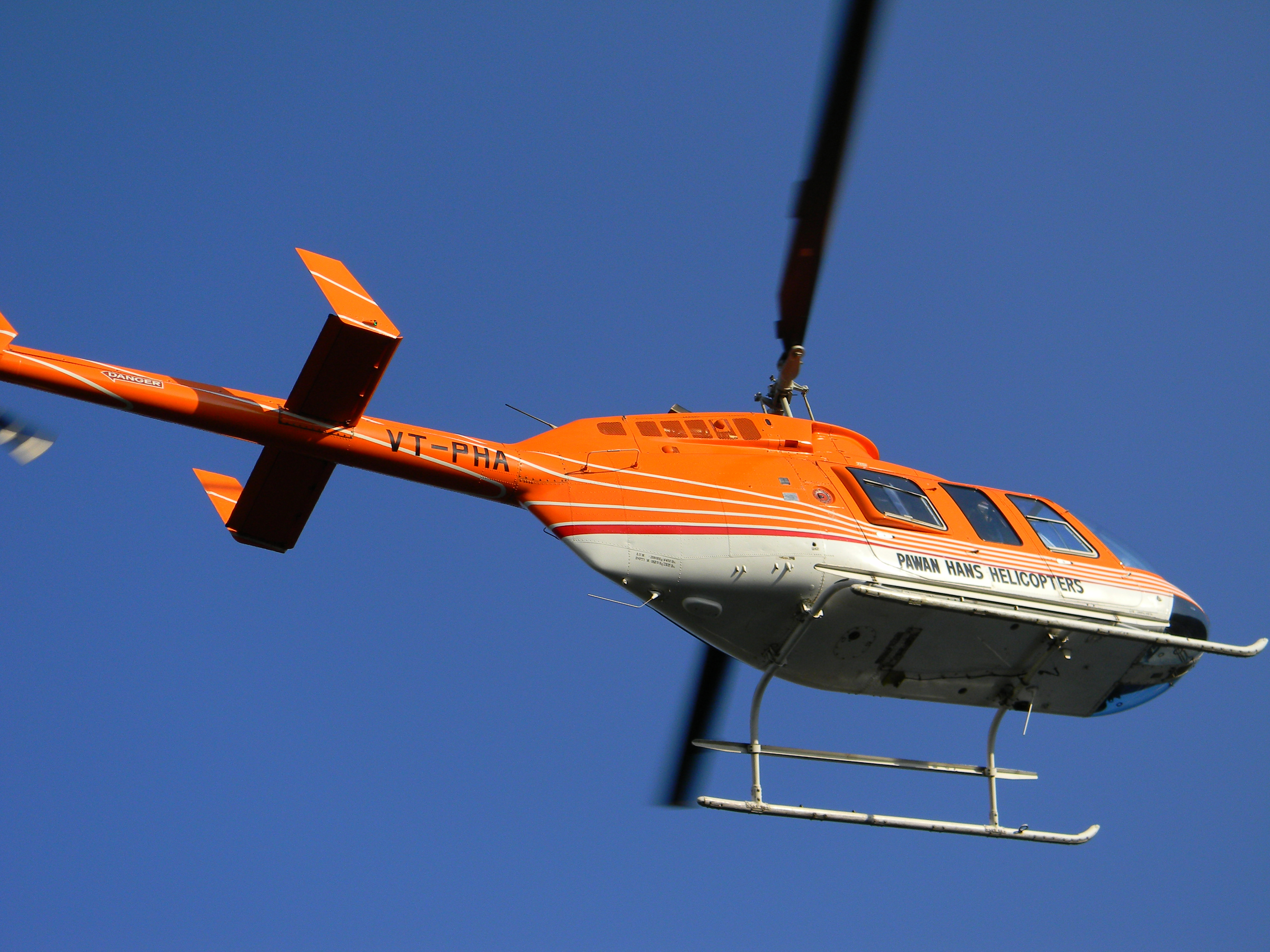
On service at Vaishno Devi to carry devotee from Katra to Vaishno Devi Dham

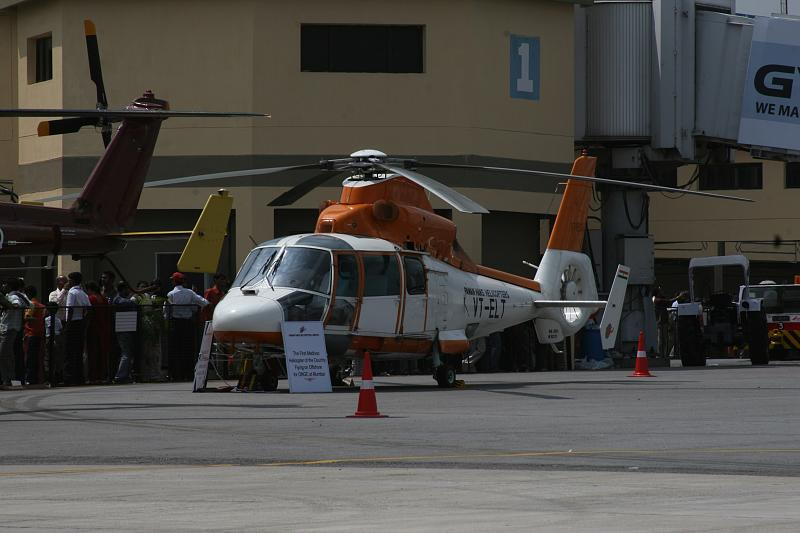
Pawan Hans owned Aérospatiale Dauphin Medical Reconnaissance helicopter on display

Pawan Hans Limited (PHL) is a transport service operated as a central public sector undertaking based at Noida in Delhi NCR, India. It is a Mini Ratna-I category PSU under the ownership of Ministry of Civil Aviation of the Government of India. It has cumulatively flown more than 1 million hours and has had 2.5 million landings on its fleet since its formation. The registered office is located in New Delhi. The corporate headquarter is located at Sector-1 in Noida with regional office at New Delhi, Mumbai and Guwahati. The operations are based at the Juhu Aerodrome in Vile Parle (West), Mumbai.

It is the country's only government-owned-helicopter service provider with the objective of providing helicopter support services to the oil sector for its offshore exploration operations, services in remote areas, and charter services for the promotion of tourism.

== History ==
Pawan Hans Limited (PHL) was incorporated on 15 October 1985 as the Helicopter Corporation of India (HCI). It commenced its operations on 1 November 1985 with 2 British Westland helicopters and later acquired 21 more helicopters. Union government had 78.5% ownership and 21.5% with ONGC. The name was changed to Pawan Hans Ltd in August 1986. In 1986/87, PHL started operating in Andaman and Nicobar islands and Lakshadweep islands.

During 1987, due to technical and structural problems plaguing the helicopter fleets, PHL grounded 9 Westland and 7 Dauphins helicopters. The Indian Air Force provided some of their older helicopters to PHL to meet the shortfall on government directives. In 1988/89, multiple crashes got PHL into serious trouble and forced PHL to withdraw all helicopter services except for one charted by ONGC. However, PHL still managed to operate a Helicopter Mail Service, though in late 1988 the HMS initiative was also withdrawn.

In 1997, Pawan Hans Helicopter Ltd and Pawan Hans Pilots' Guild settled several worker conditions. In 2001, A.P.J. Kalam who at that time was Principal Scientific Adviser to the Government of India barely escaped when the rotor of a helicopter carrying him broke down, bringing down the chopper belonging to PHL.

In July 2002, PHL was awarded the Quality Summit International Award in the Gold Category in New York for its excellence, quality, and corporate achievement by Business Initiative Directions (BID), Spain. On 16 May 2003, PHL started its Kedarnath operations with five-seater Bell-407 helicopter. On 26 August 2004, PHL signed a MOU with Uttaranchal government's Garhwal Mandal Vikas Nigam Ltd to promote tourism in state. In 2007, PHL started a 10-person project to upgrade skills of their aeronautical engineer so to make them pilots as to fight shortage of pilots.

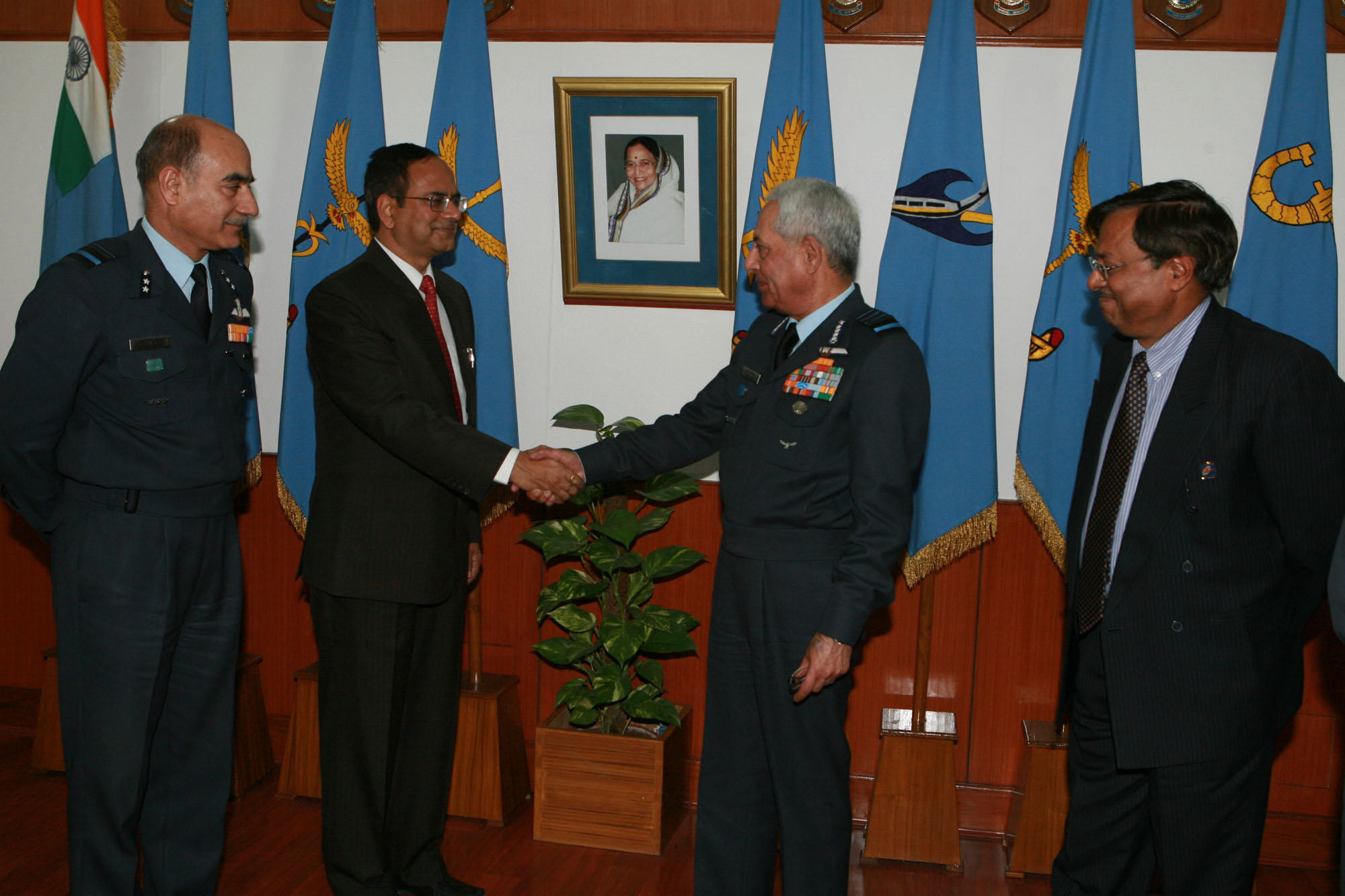
Signing of Memorandum of Understanding for releasing IAF Pilots to Pawan Hans Helicopter Ltd., in New Delhi on February 15, 2008

On 15 Feb 2008, PHL and Indian Air Force signed Memorandum of Understanding. The MOU enabled IAF helicopter pilots which were nearing retirement age to be inducted into PHL. In 2008, PHL gave Dauphin N-3 helicopters to state anti-naxal operation cell as to counter Maoist insurgency in Vidarbha District. In 2010, ONGC has upped its stake to 49%, a move that will saw the equity base of PHL being enhanced to ₹245 crores from the existing ₹113 crores.

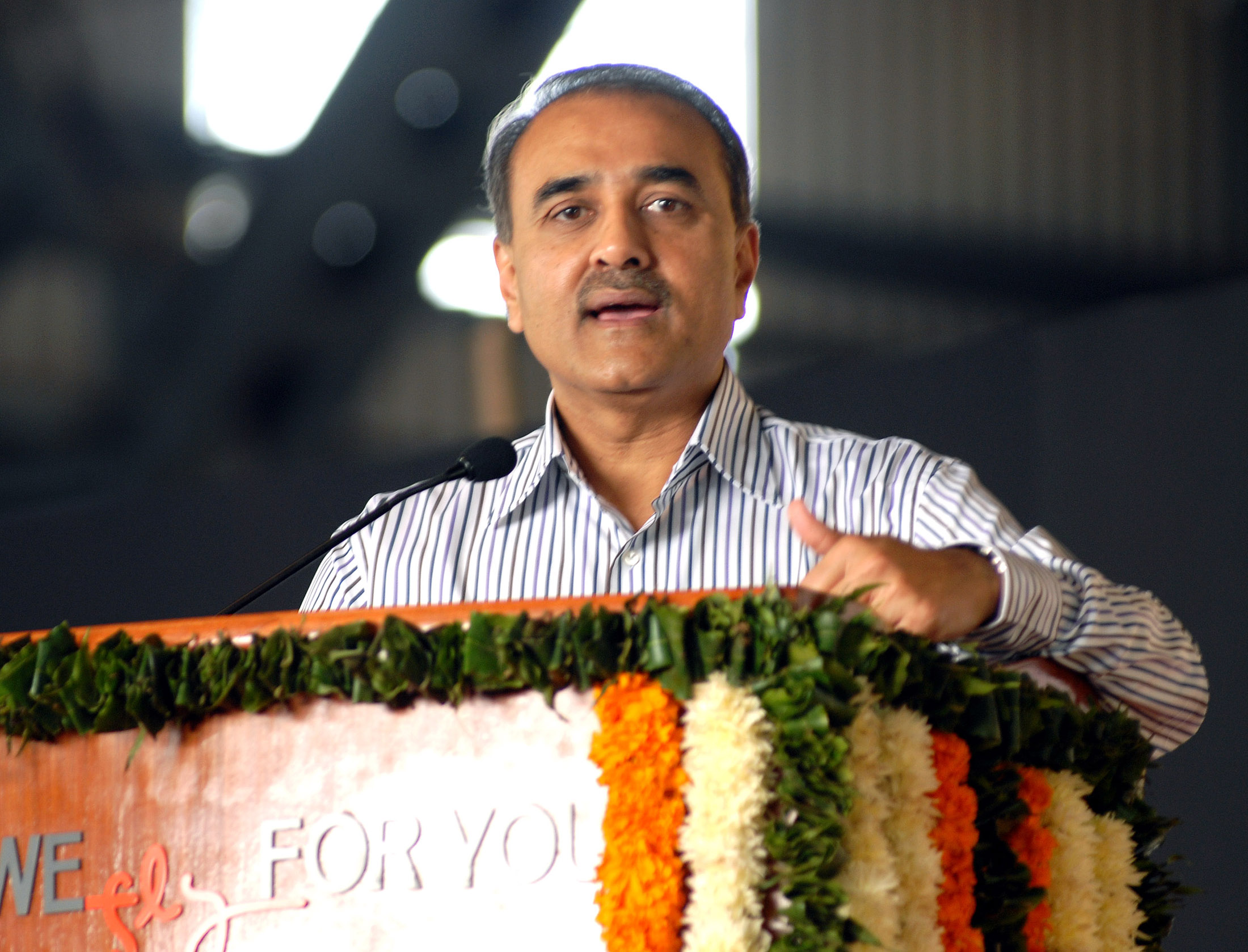
Shri Praful Patel addressing at the launch of India's first Sea Plane

On 27 December 2010, seaplane services were operationalized in the Andaman and Nicobar Islands as per the MOU signed between the Andaman and Nicobar Administration and PHL. The service began with an eight-seater Cessna 208A Amphibian seaplane named Jal Hans, which will be used by PHHL to ferry tourists between Port Blair and Havelock Island in the presence of Civil Aviation Minister Praful Patel. This was the first introduction of seaplanes in India.

On 29 April 2011, a Pawan Hans AS350 B-3 helicopter carrying Dorjee Khandu, the Chief Minister of Arunachal Pradesh, and four other people went missing. It was traced four days later near Lobthang. All 5 people were found dead. After this incident, the states of Meghalaya and Arunachal Pradesh suspended PHL services.

As of January 2017, the partially government owned helicopter service provider had a net worth of ₹3,701.5 crores, and paid-up equity share capital was ₹245.61 crores. Pawan Hans is an "Approved Maintenance Centre of Eurocopter" and also the first ISO 9001: 2000 certified aviation company in India. On 12 January 2017, the Government of India approved the privatization of Pawan Hans.

In July 2020, first helicopter service by PHL in Uttarakhand started operating under UDAN-RCS scheme. On 3 July 2023, the Department of Investment and Public Asset Management (DIPAM) scrapped the strategic disinvestment after it disqualified the successful bidder Star 9 Mobility Pvt Ltd, a consortium of three companies Maharaja Aviation Pvt, Big Charter Pvt, led by Almas Global Opportunity Fund. The consortium had placed a winning bid of ₹211.14 crore in 2021.

On 29 January 2026, Pawan Hans placed an order for 10 Dhruv NG with deliveries by 2027. Over 28 planned. Four to be operated on behalf of ONGC for 10 years. Most of their fleet is based at the company-owned Rohini Heliport located north west of New Delhi.

== Services ==
PHL provides helicopter services to Oil and Natural Gas Corporation (ONGC) to its off-shore locations as well as NTPC, GAIL, GSPC, and Oil India. This government-owned-helicopter service provider is often engaged in providing services to various state governments in India, particularly in North-east India, namely Meghalaya, Mizoram, Maharashtra, Tripura, Odisha, Himachal Pradesh. PHL also gives services to the Ministry of Home Affairs. It provides 4 Dauphin helicopters to Andaman and Nicobar Islands for inter-island transportation, and provides 2 Dauphin helicopters to Lakshadweep Administration for ferrying people from Islands to Cochin International Airport and for evacuation of patients to Kavaratti/Aggati and mainland. These helicopters are considered as the backbone of Lakshadweep and Minicoy Islands.

PHL runs helicopter services from Phata to the Kedarnath Temple during yatra seasons, i.e., May–June and September–October every year. It also provides service for Amarnath Temple from Rudraprayag. It also runs Vaishno Devi helicopter service. PHL has emerged as one of Asia's largest helicopter operators with its own operational fleet of 43 helicopters.

Pawan Hans offers helicopter services for:

- Off-Shore operations
- Inter-island transportation
- Connecting inaccessible areas
- Heli-Pilgrimage Tourism
- Training & Skill Development
- Customs and pipeline surveillance
- Casualty and rescue work
- Charter services
- Joy Rides
- VIP transportation
- Film shooting and aerial photography
- Flower dropping and other
- Customised services.
- Heliport Services
- MRO Services
- HEMS

== Destinations ==
Pawan Hans flies to various points in the states of Arunachal Pradesh, Chandigarh (U.T.) Tripura, Sikkim, Nagaland, Odisha, West Bengal, and also to MHA Guwahati in Assam. While Meghalaya state is suspended, it resumed its service on 26 July 2012. Mukul Sangma, the chief minister of Meghalaya, took a personal ride in the helicopter to check if it is resumable or not.

Arunachal Pradesh

- Itanagar (Helicopter)
- Naharlagun (Helicopter)
- Tawang Town (Helicopter)

Assam

- Guwahati – Lokpriya Gopinath Bordoloi International Airport

Chandigarh

- Chandigarh Airport (Helicopter)

Jammu and Kashmir

- Katra (Helicopter)
- Vaishno Devi Temple (Helicopter)

Maharashtra

- Mumbai – Juhu Aerodrome (HUB) (Offshore operation)

Mizoram

- Aizawl – Lunglei
- Aizawl – Kolasib
- Aizawl – Serchhip
- Aizawl – Champhai
- Aizawl – Khawzawl
- Aizawl – Lawngtlai
- Aizawl – Saiha
- Aizawl – Chawngte
- Aizawl – Mamit

Meghalaya

- Shillong – Shillong Airport
- Tura (Helicopter)

Odisha

- Bhubaneswar – Biju Patnaik International Airport
- Paradip (Helicopter)
- Jharsuguda
- Brahmapur

Himachal Pradesh

- Shimla Airport (Helicopter)

West Bengal

- Kolkata – Cooch Behar
- Durgapur – Asansol
- Durgapur – Haldia
- Siliguri – Darjeeling
- Kolkata – Siliguri
- Kolkata – Durgapur
- including Malda

Uttrakhand

- Dehradun – Phata- Shri Kedarnath – Phata – Dehradun (Sessional Charter Services)
- Phata- Shri Kedarnath – Phata (Sessional Passenger Services)
- Char Dham Yatra (Shri Kedarnath, Shri BadriNath, Gangotri and Yamnotri)
- Dehradun - New Tehri - Srinagar- Gauchar and vice versa

== Fleet ==
The Pawan Hans fleet of 42 helicopters as of April 2021 which includes:

Model	Category	Total	Average Age (years)	Crew	Pax.
Bell 206 L4	Light, single-engine	3	26	1–2	4–6
Bell 407	Light, single-engine	3	18	1–2	4–6
AS350 B3	Light, single-engine	2	11	1–2	4–6
Dauphin SA-365 N	Medium	17	34	2	10
Dauphin AS365 N3	Medium	14	13	2	10
Mil Mi-17-2	Heavy	3	14	4	26

It also operates & maintains HAL Dhruv helicopters belonging to Hindustan Aeronautics Limited.

=== Rent ===
- Pawan Hans also rents a helicopter on a long-term contract to the Regatta Group.

=== Jal Hans ===
Pawan Hans jointly owns Jal Hans, India's first amphibious aircraft service with the Andaman and Nicobar Islands Administration. Jal hans has a fleet of Cessena 208A's.

== Accidents and incidents ==
In 2011, PHHLs operations in the North Eastern States of India came under serious public criticism due to safety issues. After the crash that killed the Chief Minister of Arunachal Pradesh Dorjee Khandu and five others, it operations in the North East region were suspended and DGCA was asked to conduct safety audit of the company. The operations were resumed in January 2013. But yet another accident took place on 4 August 2015 killing 3 people on board, including an IAS officer.

- July 1988: A Westland crashed near Vaishno Devi killing 5 passengers and two crew members.
- August 1988: A Dauphin crashed in sea near Madras killing 8 passengers and two pilots.
- Feb 1989: A helicopter crashed near Kohima killing 2 pilots and a technician.
- 1 Dec 1989: A helicopter crashed in Juhu airport.
- 15 Dec 1989: Helicopter crashed in Ganga near Patna killing 7 people.
- May 8, 2001: Arunachal Pradesh education minister Dera Natung died when a Pawan Hans helicopter carrying him from Itanagar to West Kameng crashed due to rough weather.
- 30 Sep 2001: Helicopter crashlanded at the airport containing A. P. J. Kalam. No one was hurt.
- 6 May 2002: A Pawan Hans Dauphin helicopter carrying eight ONGC personnel crashed into Arabian Sea. All 10 people survived.
- 22 Sep 2004: Meghalaya Community and Rural Development Minister Cyprian Sangma, two MLAs and a former Deputy Speaker were killed when a Pawan Hans helicopter A 365N crashed near Shillong.
- 26 Sep 2007: A PHI Ambulance helicopter crashed while landing at the Kavaratti helipad. All 3 people on helicopter escaped.
- 06 Aug 2010: A Pawan Hans crew member fell 10,000 feet (3,000 m) to his death at Namsai in Arunachal Pradesh, while trying to close a door of that had flung open during a flight.
- 16 Dec 2010: A Pawan Hans Dauphin 365 N3 helicopter crashed barely 30 minutes before it State Industries and Local Bodies Minister Manoranjan Kalia at Chandigarh Airport, leaving the pilots injured.
- 19 Apr 2011: A Pawan Hans Mil Mi-172 on a flight from Guwahati to Tawang, crashed in a gorge and caught fire while trying to land near Tawang. Out of 23 people on board, 17 were killed.
- 29 Apr 2011: A Pawan Hans AS350 B-3 helicopter carrying Dorjee Khandu, the Chief Minister of Arunachal Pradesh, and four other people, Tawang to Itanagar went missing. It was traced four days later near Lobthang. All 5 people were found dead.
- 29 Dec 2012: A Pawan Hans had to make an emergency landing. It was carrying 6 pilgrims and 1 pilot to Vaishnodevi. No one died but were injured.
- 04 Aug 2015: A Pawan Hans Dauphin N3 twin-engined aircraft carrying Tirap Deputy Commissioner Kamlesh Kumar Joshi, a 2010 batch IAS officer, and pilots M S Brar and Rajeev Hoskote crashed killing all its occupants.
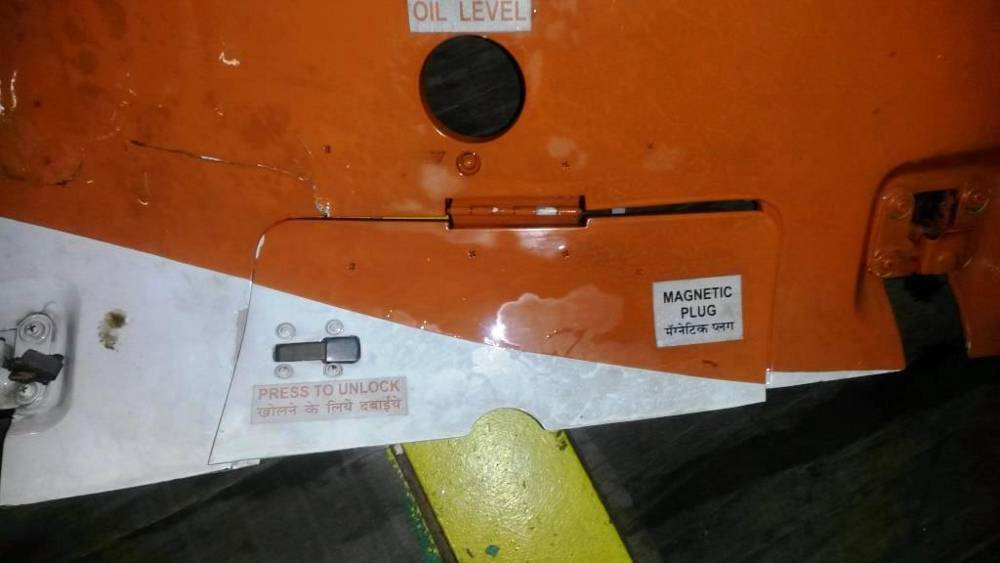
- Debris from the Pawan Hans Limited Helicopter located by an ONGC Ship 4 July 2015
  04 Nov 2015: Pawan Hans Helicopter (Aerospatiale Dauphin) employed in offshore oil platform service crashed into the Arabian Sea off the coast of Mumbai. The Helicopter was on night flying practice when the incident happened and was occupied by two pilots only, no passengers were present. Both the pilots perished in the incident.
- 13 Jan 2018: Pawan Hans Helicopter crashed into the Arabian Sea Off the coast of Mumbai while ferrying seven people including ONGC personnel. The bodies of the seven people, including five senior ONGC officers, debris from the aircraft was located.
- 28 June 2022: Pawan Hans Sikorsky helicopter crashed into the Arabian Sea killing four people, including three ONGC personnel. Five others were rescued.
- 24 Feb 2026: A helicopter with seven people on board, including 2 crew members and 5 passengers, took off from Port Blair around 0845 hours IST. The copter ditched into the sea for an emergency landing near Mayabunder at around 0930 hours IST. An emergency response team reached the site and rescued everyone safely. The passengers included three men, a woman and a child. The company described the incident as a "short landing incident".

== See also ==
- Rohini Heliport (Delhi) India
