= Lathao =

Village in Arunachal Pradesh, India

- Village
- Map of Arunachal Pradesh Lathao (India)
- Coordinates: 27.74422°N 95.91018°E
- Country: India
- State: Arunachal Pradesh
- District: Lohit
- Tehsil: Lathao

Population (2011)
  - Total: 2,756

Languages
- Time zone: UTC+5:30 (IST)
- Postal code: 792103
- Census code: 266563

Lathao is a village in Namsai district created in 2014. Before 2014, it was part of Lohit district of Arunachal Pradesh, India. As per the 2011 Census of India, Lathao has a population of 2,756 people including 1,466 males and 1,290 females.
