= Tangani railway station =

Railway station in Assam, India

TANGANI

General information
- Location: Dambuk, Assam; India
- Coordinates: 27.452307°N 94.714859°E
- Elevation: 112 metres (367 ft)
- System: Indian Railways station
- Owner: Indian Railways
- Operator: Northeast Frontier Railway zone
- Platforms: 2
- Tracks: 3
- Connections: Auto stand

Construction
- Structure type: Standard (on-ground station)
- Parking: Available
- Cycle facilities: Available

Other information
- Status: Double electric line
- Station code: TNGN
- Zone(s): Northeast Frontier Railway
- Division(s): Tinsukia

History
- Opened: 2 December 2018
Location

Tangani railway station is a small railway station in Dhemaji district, Assam. Its station code is TNGN. It serves Lower Sisitangani region. The station has two platforms. It is a railway station that connects Dhemaji and Dibrugarh.

== Major trains ==
- Ledo-Murkongselek DEMU
- Murkongselek-Ledu DEMU
