= Sangti Valley =

Valley in India

Sangti Valley is located in Eastern Himalayan Foothills, West Kameng district of Arunachal Pradesh. Sangti River flows along with the valley. Sangti river meets with Dirang River at Dirang Dzong village, which is located near the Dirang town.

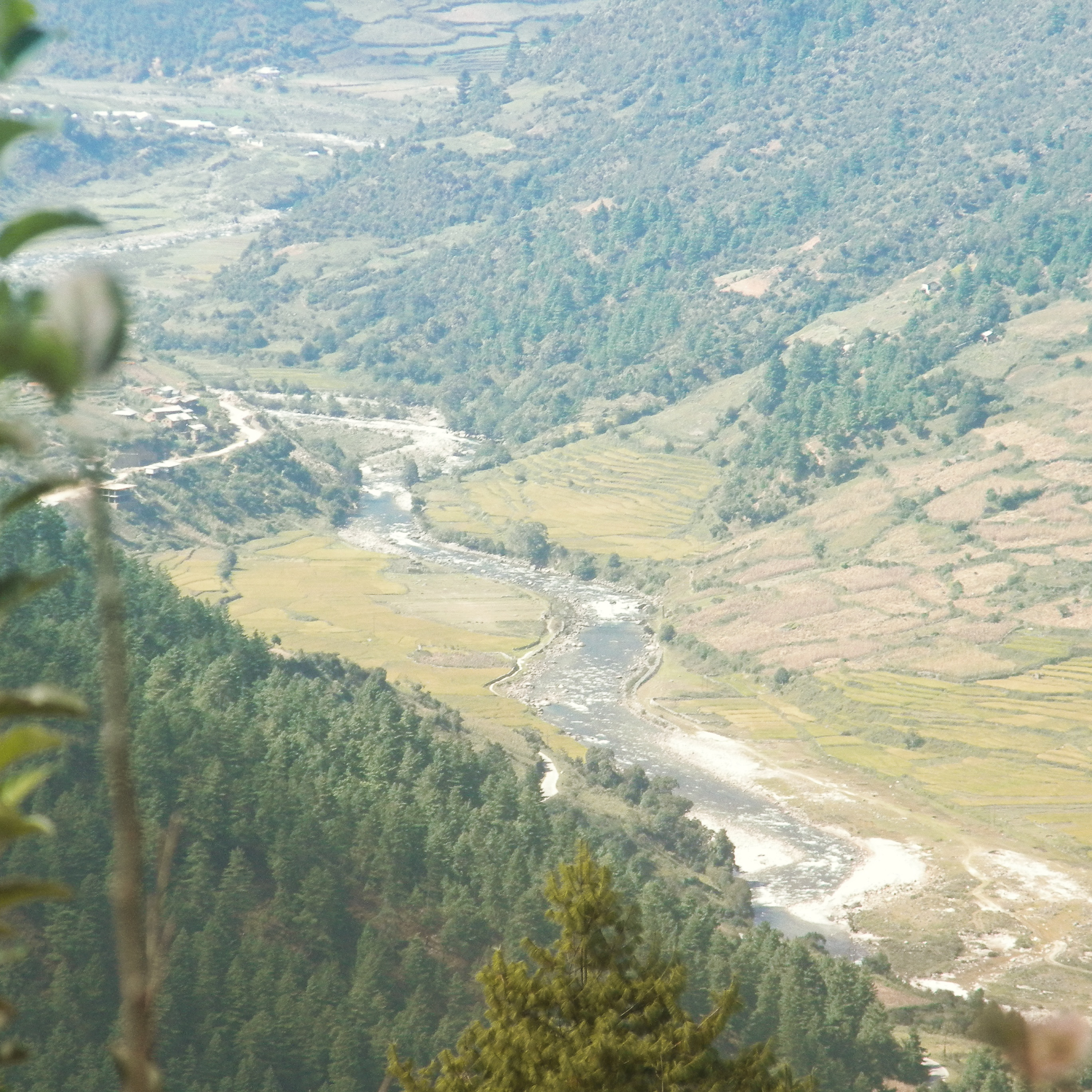
Sangti river

Sangti Valley is known for its picturesque scenery and weather. Sangti village is located onsite of valley and about 15 kilometres from Dirang. The valley is also a tourist destination for trekkers.

== Transportation ==
=== Road ===
The village connected through Bomdilla - Tawang highway. There is a road which connects Dirang Dzong village to Sangti Village which is about 10 km long.

== Places ==
- Sangti Village, village located inside the valley. The village comes under Dirang circle of West Kameng district. The village located 45 km from district headquarter at Bomdila. The village is mostly inhibited by Monpa people who follow Mahayana Buddhism. The population of the village is 630.
- Buddhist Monasteries, there are many Monpa worshipped monasteries located alongside valley.
- Sangti Valley Sheep Farm, is sheep breeding farm located 7 km from Dirang located on bank of Sangti river.
- Campsite, there many campsites located in the valley along with the river. They are owned and maintained by locals.

== Wildlife ==
The valley is breeding centre for an endangered species of Black-necked crane (thing thung karmu). The bird is considered holy in Monpa communities resides in valley.

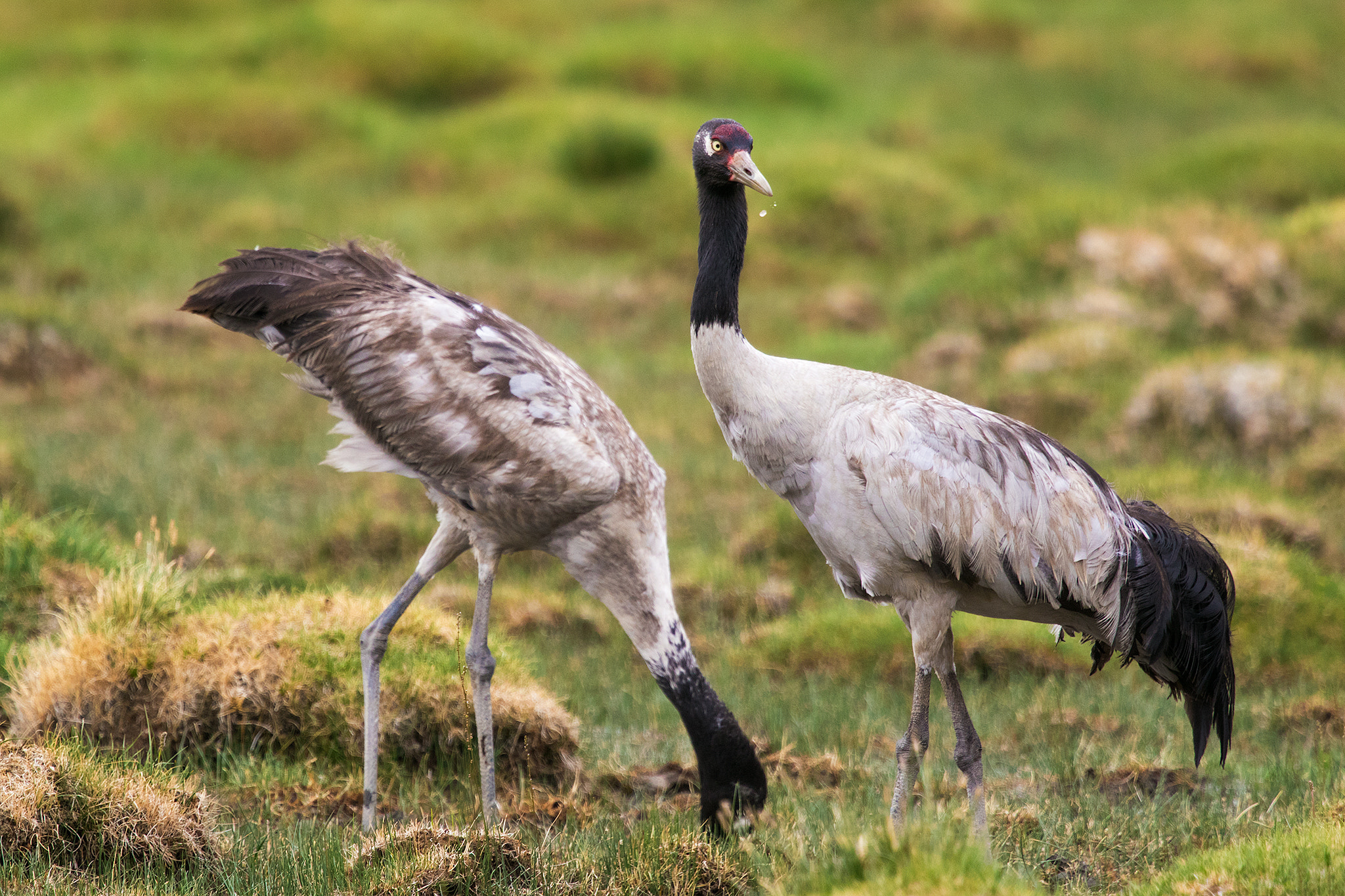
Black Necked Crane
