= Kaisu =

Village in Arunachal Pradesh, India

Coordinates: 27.673°N 95.915°E

Kaisu is a village located in Namsai district (earlier, Lohit district) of Arunachal Pradesh in India,

As per Population Census 2011 there are total 39 families residing in the village. The population of the Kaisu village is 232, of which 115 are males and 117 are females.
