= Namsai, Arunachal Pradesh =

Namsai
- City
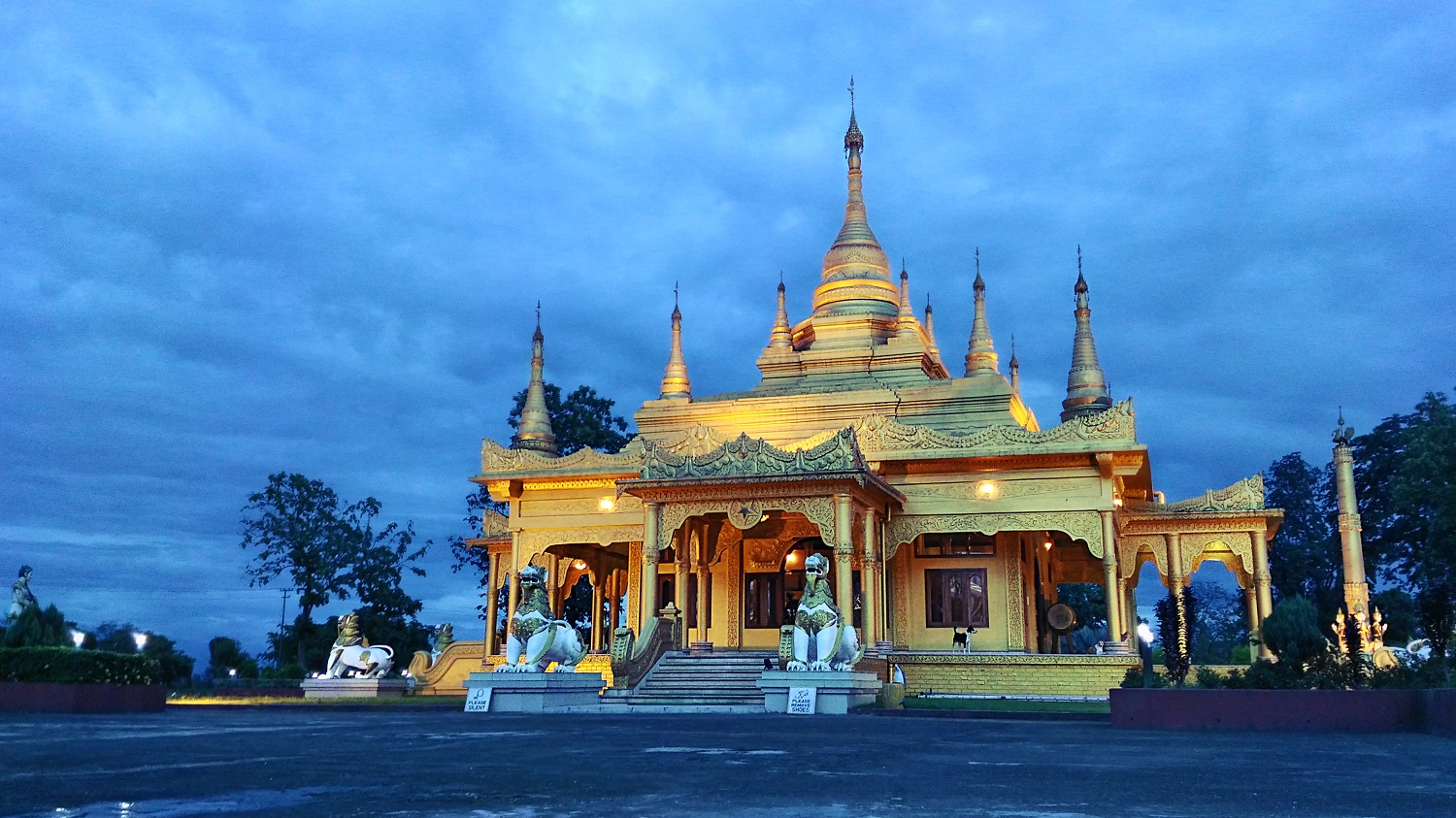
- Golden Pagoda at Namsai

- Location in Arunachal Pradesh, India
- Coordinates: 27.66894°N 95.87135°E
- Country: India
- State: Arunachal Pradesh
- District: Namsai
- Established: Namsai district inaugurated on 15 August 2014

Population (2011)
  - Total: 14,246
  - Density: 60.46/km^{2} (156.6/sq mi)

Languages
  - Official: English
- Time zone: UTC+5:30 (IST)
- PIN: 792103
- Telephone code: 03806
- Vehicle registration: AR-20

Namsai is the headquarters of Namsai district in the Indian state of Arunachal Pradesh. This place is one of the 60 constituencies of Arunachal. Name of current MLA (August-2016) of Namsai constituency is Zingnu Namchoom.

== Overview ==
Situated near the Nao-Dihing river, the township received a major boost when the much-awaited bridge over the river was inaugurated in March 2002. The bridge is 660.37m long and recently it came to the 2nd position in Arunachal Pradesh after the inauguration of Parasuram Bridge, which is 85 km ahead of Namsai. Some 30 km to the east lies the town of Diyun. The road to Diyun takes a turn from the NH52. This road, developed by Oil India Limited, is still functioning although it is worsening with each year. Just 75 km from Tinsukia Town, the major railway station, Namsai is fast developing as a township.

== Demographics ==
As per 2011 Indian census, Namsai has a population of 14,246 of which 7,487 are males while 6,759 are females. Population of children age 0-6 is 2,098 which is 14.73% of total population. Female sex ratio is of 903 against state average of 938. Child sex ratio is around 964 compared to state average of 972. Literacy rate is 76.61%, higher than state average of 65.38%. Male literacy is around 82.10% while female literacy rate is 70.45%.

=== Languages ===
Languages spoken in Namsai Town (2011)
1. Assamese (13.8%)
2. Bengali (13.6%)
3. Hindi (9.94%)
4. Bhojpuri (8.18%)
5. Nepali (7.74%)
6. Adi (4.02%)
7. Others (inc. Khamti) (42.8%)

According to Census 2011, Assamese is spoken by 1,961 people, Bengali by 1,932 people, Hindi by 1,416 people, Bhojpuri at 1,166, Nepali by 1,102 people and Adi by 573.

== Tourism ==
=== Golden Pagoda ===
Located in the heart of Namsai town, this pagoda was the first prominent structure to come up in the area. It is surrounded by temples in the vast compound along with other structures.

The newer Golden Pagoda Monastery at Tengapani in Namsai district is a major tourist destination. Known as 'Kongmu Kham' in the local Tai-Khamti language, Golden Pagoda is one of the largest Buddhist monasteries in North East India. Tengapani is located about 20 km far, northerly to Namsai town.

== Media ==
Namsai has an All India Radio Relay station known as Akashvani Namsai. It broadcasts on FM frequencies.
