= Doimukh =

Coordinates: 27°09′N 93°45′E

Doimukh is a small town in Papum Pare district in the Indian state of Arunachal Pradesh. It is located 18 km south of Yupia, the district headquarters. Its PIN code is 791112. It is one of the 60 constituencies of the Legislative Assembly of Arunachal Pradesh. The current MLA (as of July 2024) of this constituency is NABAM VIVEK. It is the home of the Nyishi tribe and traditions.

== Notable people ==
- Taba Chake (born 1993), guitarist and musician, born in Doimukh

== See also ==
- List of constituencies of Arunachal Pradesh Legislative Assembly
- Arunachal Pradesh Legislative Assembly
