= National Highway 415 (India) =

National highway in India

National Highway 415

Route information
- Length: 59 km (37 mi)

Major junctions
- From: Banderdewa
- To: Gohpur

Location
- Country: India
- States: Assam, Arunachal Pradesh
- Primary destinations: Itanagar, Doimukh

Highway system
- Roads in India; Expressways; National; State; Asian
← NH 15	→ NH 15

National Highway 415 (NH 415) starts from Banderdewa, Arunachal Pradesh and ends at Gohpur, Assam. The highway is 59 km (37 mi) long, of which 15 km (9.3 mi) is in Assam and 42 km (26 mi) in Arunachal Pradesh.

== See also ==
- List of national highways in India
- National Highways Development Project
