= Banderdewa =

Banderdewa Gate
- Town
- Location in Arunachal Pradesh, India Banderdewa (India)
- Coordinates: 27.095158°N 93.827370°E
- Country: India
- State: Arunachal Pradesh
- District: Papum Pare district
- Established: 25-01-1873
- Founder: Baba Bajrang Nath
- Named for: Lord Hanuman

Government
  - Body: State Government

Languages
  - Official: English
- Time zone: UTC+5:30 (IST)
- PIN: 784160
- Vehicle registration: AS
- Coastline: 0 kilometres (0 mi)

Banderdewa is a town in Itanagar Capital Region under Papum Pare district, situated on the bank of the Dikrong River in southern Arunachal Pradesh, India, right at the border with Assam state. The population of the town is only a few thousand people, who mainly rely on agriculture in their family's economy. Banderdewa's name is derived from Bander (Monkey) and Dewa (God) that is none other than Lord Hanuman. This town acts as a "Gateway to Arunachal Pradesh" and hence is also a 'check gate to enter into Assam. The region has also figured in discussions concerning the long-standing Assam–Arunachal Pradesh boundary dispute, owing to its location in a sensitive border zone. Recent years have witnessed administrative and land-related issues associated with the interstate boundary..

== Significance ==
As the principal road entrance to Arunachal Pradesh, Banderdewa plays a crucial role in the implementation of the Inner Line Permit (ILP) system, which regulates the entry of non-residents into the state. The check gate at Banderdewa is one of the most important ILP verification points in Arunachal Pradesh.

== Location ==
Banderdewa situated at ~186 metres (610 feet) above sea level is well connected by road and railway, and the nearest railway station is "Harmuti Junction". The nearest airport is Lilabari (IXI) located near North Lakhimpur in Assam. Donyi Polo Airport, Itanagar near Itanagar also serves as another nearest airport to Banderdewa. National Highway 415 (India) starts at Banderdewa. It is the lifeline of the Itanagar Capital Region because it connects Itanagar and Naharlagun with Assam and the rest of India. Another National Highway NH-15 passes through Banderdewa town. District HQ Yupia is at 31km away.

== Economy ==
It is 31 kilometres (19 mi) from the capital of Itanagar and a major transportation hub for Arunachal Pradesh. The economy of Banderdewa is based on trade, transportation, agriculture, and services associated with interstate movement. Due to its location at the entry point to Arunachal Pradesh, the town hosts markets, transport facilities, and commercial establishments catering to travellers and local residents. It is also known for its electronic goods market.

== Society and Culture ==
Banderdewa is a multicultural settlement where indigenous communities of Arunachal Pradesh interact with Assamese-speaking populations from neighbouring Assam. The town reflects the cultural diversity of the northeastern region and serves as a meeting point of tribal and non-tribal communities. People from Assam and Arunachal often celebrate each other’s festivals, reflecting cultural exchange.

== Education ==
Educational institutions in and around Banderdewa include schools established to serve local communities and government personnel. One notable institution is Vivekananda Kendra Vidyalaya (VKV), Banderdewa, established in 2004 within the Police Training Centre campus.
