= Papum Pare district =

Coordinates: 27°09′00″N 93°43′12″E

- District of Arunachal Pradesh
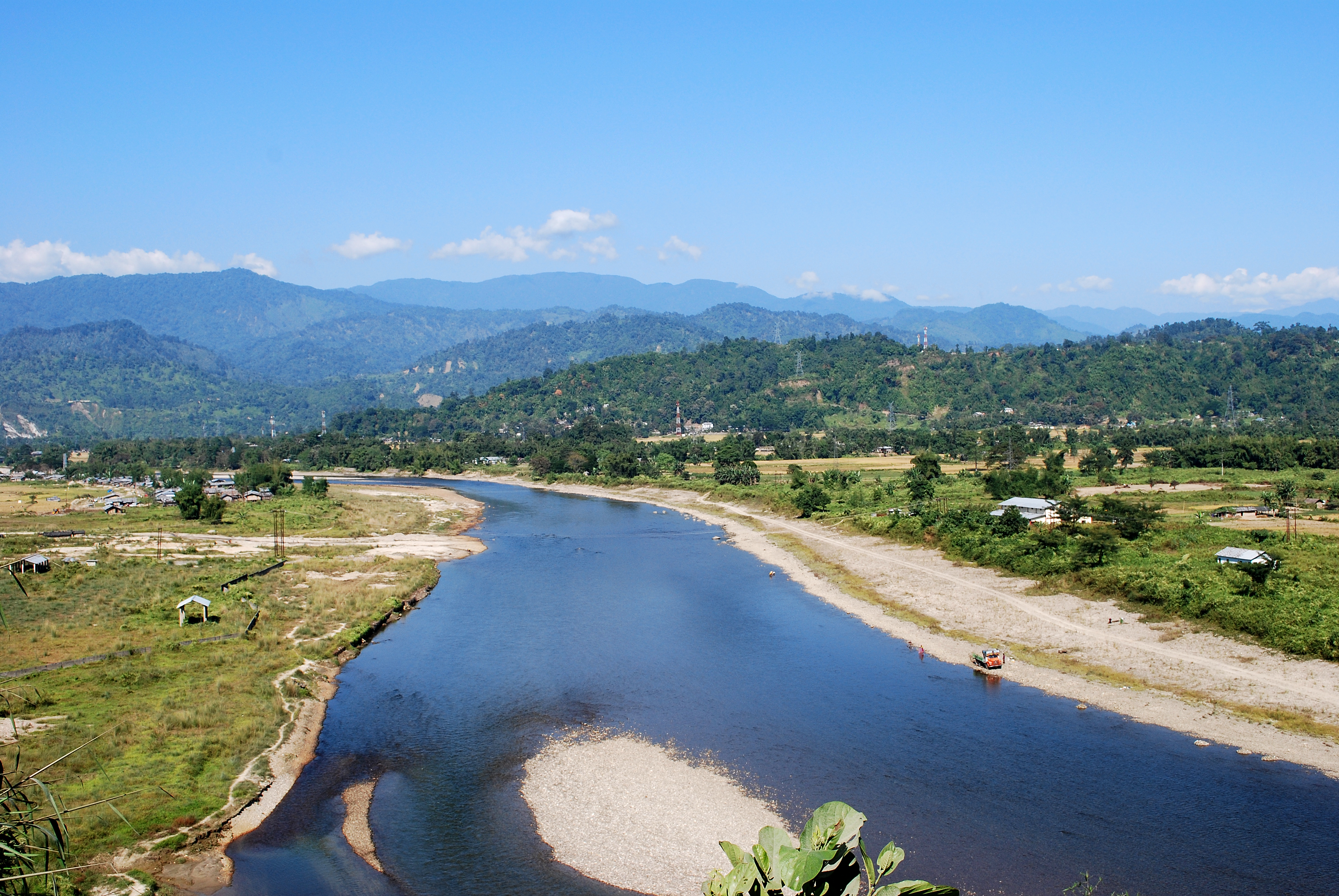
- Dikrong river near Itanagar

- Location of Papum Pare district
- Papum Pare district
- Country: India
- State: Arunachal Pradesh
- Headquarters: Yupia

Area
  - Total: 2,875 km^{2} (1,110 sq mi)

Population (2011)
  - Total: 176,573
  - Density: 61.42/km^{2} (159.1/sq mi)

Demographics
  - Literacy: 82.1%
  - Sex ratio: 950
- Time zone: UTC+05:30 (IST)
- Website: papumpare.nic.in

Papum Pare district (Pron:/ˌpæpəm ˈpæɹɪ, ˈpɑ:ɹeɪ/) is an administrative district in the state of Arunachal Pradesh in India. As of 2011, it is the most populous district of Arunachal Pradesh (out of 20).

== History ==
The district was formed in 1999 when it was split from Lower Subansiri district.

== Geography ==
The district headquarters are located at Yupia. Papum Pare district occupies an area of 2,875 square kilometres (1,110 sq mi). The capital of the state is Itanagar.

== Subdivisions ==
The district is divided into three subdivisions: Itanagar capital complex, Yupia, and Sagalee. The district is further divided into 15 administrative circles, namely, Balijan, Itanagar, Naharlagun, Doimukh, Toru, Sagalee, Leporiang, Mengio, Kimin, Banderdewa, Tarasso, Kakoi, Gumto, Parang, and Sangdupota.

There are 3 Arunachal Pradesh Legislative Assembly constituencies in this district: Itanagar, Doimukh and Sagalee. All of these are part of Arunachal West Lok Sabha constituency.

=== Itanagar capital complex ===
Itanagar capital complex is administered by its own Deputy Commissioner, and contains the three circles of Itanagar, Naharlagun, and Banderdewa.

In January 2013 the Arunachal Pradesh government approved the creation of a "Capital district". The capital complex is currently treated as its own district by some government departments, the Ministry of Micro, Small and Medium Enterprises for example, and the Arunachal Pradesh State portal in particular. But The Arunachal Pradesh reorganization of district Act of 1980 with the latest amendments does not list Itanagar capital complex as a district.

== Demographics ==
Historical population
Year	Pop.	±%
1961	12,823	—
1971	17,632	+37.5%
1981	39,736	+125.4%
1991	72,811	+83.2%
2001	122,003	+67.6%
2011	176,573	+44.7%
Source: Census of India

According to the 2011 census, Papum Pare district has a population of 176,573, roughly equal to the nation of São Tomé and Príncipe. This gives it a ranking of 594th in India (out of a total of 640). The district has a population density of 51 inhabitants per square kilometre (130/sq mi). Its population growth rate over the decade 2001–2011 was 44.57%. Papum Pare has a sex ratio of 950 females for every 1000 males, and a literacy rate of 82.14%.

=== Religion ===
Religion in Papum Pare District (2011)
1. Christianity (47.8%)
2. Hinduism (32.3%)
3. Donyi-Polo (12.8%)
4. Islam (3.48%)
5. Buddhism (2.70%)
6. Sikhism (0.18%)
7. Jainism (0.08%)
8. Not Stated (0.68%)

Christianity is the largest religion in the district, followed by over 47% of people. Hinduism is the second-largest religion in the district with over 32.3% adherents. Other religions such as Donyi-Polo, Islam and Sikhism are followed by 3.48% and 0.18% people respectively. Papum Pare is inhabited by members of the Nyishi, who are traditionally followers of Donyi-Polo. Some members of the Nyishi tribe are followers of Christianity.

=== Language ===
Languages of Papum Pare District (2011)
1. Nyishi (54.6%)
2. Bengali (10.5%)
3. Adi (8.26%)
4. Hindi (8.18%)
5. Assamese (4.97%)
6. Nepali (4.51%)
7. Others (8.96%)

== Flora and fauna ==
In 1978 Papum Pare district became home to the Itanagar Wildlife Sanctuary, which has an area of 140 km^{2} (54.1 mi^{2}).
