= Naharlagun =

- Town
- Location in Arunachal Pradesh, India Naharlagun (India)
- Coordinates: 27.103029°N 93.700848°E
- Country: India
- State: Arunachal Pradesh
- District: Itanagar capital complex
- Elevation: 155 m (509 ft)

Population (2011)
  - Total: 36,158
- Time zone: UTC+5:30 (IST)
- PIN: 791110
- Telephone code: 0360
- ISO 3166 code: IN-AR
- Vehicle registration: AR
- Climate: Cwa

Naharlagun is a town situated in the foothills of the Himalayas in the Indian state of Arunachal Pradesh. It falls in and is administered as a part of Itanagar Capital Complex.

== Geography ==
It is at an altitude of 155 metres (509 ft) above sea level. Surrounded by mountains, Naharlagun is a city which sees annual long monsoon rains. The weather is sub-tropical, with hot and humid summer and temperate winter.

== Demographics ==
As of 2011 India census, Naharlagun had a population of 36,158. Males constitute 53% of the population and females 47%. Naharlagun has an average literacy rate of 69%, higher than the national average of 59.5%: male literacy is 74%, and female literacy is 62%. In Naharlagun, 15% of the population is under 6 years of age.

=== Religion ===
Others include Sikhism, Jainism & Not stated

Religion in Naharlagun
Religion	Percent
Hinduism	43.14%
Christianity	32.28%
Donyi Polo	16.23%
Islam	4.80%
Buddhism	1.75%
Others	0.80%

According to the 2011 census, 43.14% of the population is Hindu, 32.28% Christian, 16.23% Donyi Polo, 4.80% Muslim and 1.75% Buddhist

=== Languages ===
Languages spoken in Itanagar (2011)
1. Nishi (34.3%)
2. Bangla (15.7%)
3. Adi (12.0%)
4. Hindi (9.18%)
5. Apatani (7.20%)
6. Assamese (6.22%)
7. Nepali (3.76%)
8. Bhojpuri (3.41%)
9. Others (8.20%)

According to 2011 census, Nishi was the most spoken language in Naharlagun with 12,414 speakers followed by Bengali at 5,667, Adi at 4,351, Hindi at 3,319, Assamese at 2,250, Apatani at 2,639, Nepali at 1,358 and Bhojpuri at 1,236.

== Transport ==
Naharlagun railway station is the first major rail head in the state of Arunachal Pradesh. The premier train Arunachal AC Superfast Express links Naharlagun with Anand Vihar Terminal at Delhi. It has also a helicopter service of Pawan Hans to Dibrugarh Airport and Guwahati Airport. It is connected by road to the rest of country via Guwahati which is 380 kilometres (240 mi) away.

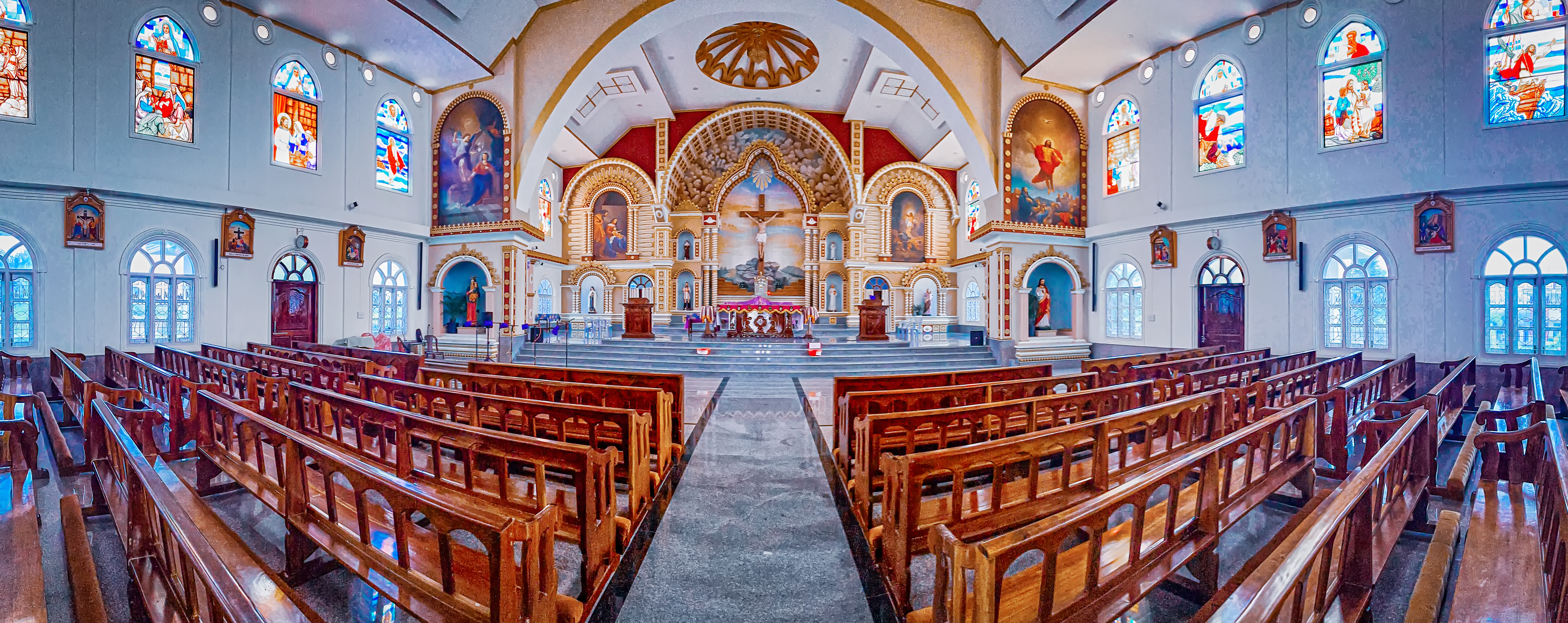
Sacred Heart Church, Naharlagun
