= List of people of Tani descent =

List of notable people of Tani descent

The following is a list of notable people belonging to Tani people.

== Adi ==
- Chum Darang, Actress and Model
- Daying Ering, Indian Politician
- Gegong Apang, Politician
- Jomin Tayeng, IAS Officer
- Mamang Dai, Poet
- Ninong Ering, Indian Politician
- Oken Tayeng, Politician
- Omak Apang, Politician
- Talom Rukbo, Spiritualist & Founder of Donyi Polo Movement
- Tapir Gao, Indian Politician
- Tarung Pabin, Indian Politician
- Tati Lego, British-Indian Soldier & Administrator
- Takeng Taggu, Pastor (Clergy)
- Yanung Jamoh Lego, Indian Herbalist

== Apatani ==
- Hage Appa, Indian politician
- Padi Richo, Indian politician
- Tage Rita, Businesswoman
- Tage Taki, Indian politician
- Robin Hibu, IPS officer
- Tilling Huda, Ruler of the Three Domains

== Mising ==
- Bharat Narah, Politician
- Bhubon Pegu, Politician
- Ganesh Kutum, Politician
- Indira Miri, Indian Educationist
- Jadav Payeng, Forest Man of India
- Lalit Kumar Doley, Indian Politician
- Mrinal Miri, Indian Philosopher
- Naba Kumar Doley, Politician
- Rajib Lochan Pegu, Politician
- Ranoj Pegu, Education Minister of Assam
- Shakuntala Doley Gamlin, IAS Officer
- Tarun Chandra Pamegam, Writer
- Tabu Taid, Indian Author

== Galo ==
- Anthony Doke, Commander in Chief of Tani Army (Separatist/Insurgent)
- Binny Yanga, Social Worker
- Eken Riba, Politician
- Jarbom Gamlin, Politician
- Moje Riba, Politician (Indian National Congress)
- Shakuntala Gamlin, Administrator
- Tomo Riba, Politician

== Tagin ==
- Tapi Mra, Mountaineer
- Tine Mena, Mountaineer
- Nabab Dadi, Well known Footballer

== Nyishi ==
- Kameng Dolo, Politician
- Kiren Rijiju, Politician
- Nabam Tuki, Politician
- Takam Sanjoy, Politician

== See also ==
- Tani people
- List of people from Arunachal Pradesh
