= Ziro–Hapoli Assembly constituency =

Legislative Assembly constituency in Arunachal Pradesh, India

Coordinates: 27.542°N 93.817°E

Ziro-Hapoli
- Constituency No. 17 for the Arunachal Pradesh Legislative Assembly

Constituency details
- Country: India
- Region: Northeast India
- State: Arunachal Pradesh
- District: Lower Subansiri
- Lok Sabha constituency: Arunachal West
- Established: 1978
- Total electors: 25,285
- Reservation: ST

Member of Legislative Assembly
- 11th Arunachal Pradesh Legislative Assembly
- Incumbent Hage Appa
- Party: Bharatiya Janata Party
- Elected year: 2024

Ziro-Hapoli is one of the 60 constituencies of Legislative Assembly of Arunachal Pradesh. Name of current MLA (August 2019) of this constituency is Tage Taki who defeated his nearest rival Nani Ribia to win his consecutive tenure. Ziro and Hapoli are one of the most literate towns in the Indian state of Arunachal Pradesh. Lower Subansiri is the name of the district that contains Ziro-Hapoli.

== Members of the Legislative Assembly ==
Election	Name	Party
1978	Padi Yubbe	Janata Party
1980	Padi Yubbe	Independent politician
1984	Gyati Takka	Indian National Congress
1990	Padi Yubbe	Independent politician
1995	Tapi Batt	Janata Party
1999	Padi Richo	Indian National Congress
2004	Nani Ribia	Independent politician
2009	Padi Richo	Indian National Congress
2014	Tage Taki	Bharatiya Janata Party
2019	Tage Taki	Bharatiya Janata Party
2024	Hage Appa	Bharatiya Janata Party

== Election results ==
=== Assembly Election 2024 ===
2024 Arunachal Pradesh Legislative Assembly election : Ziro–Hapoli
Party	Candidate	Votes	%	±%
BJP	Hage Appa	Unopposed		
Registered electors		25,285		▲8.29
BJP hold		Swing		

=== Assembly Election 2019 ===
2019 Arunachal Pradesh Legislative Assembly election : Ziro–Hapoli
Party	Candidate	Votes	%	±%
BJP	Tage Taki	9,853	54.14%	▲1.40
INC	Nani Ribia	8,079	44.39%	▼1.11
NOTA	None of the Above	267	1.47%	▲0.46
Margin of victory		1,774	9.75%	▲2.51
Turnout		18,199	77.94%	▼1.85
Registered electors		23,349		▲10.59
BJP hold		Swing	▲1.40	

=== Assembly Election 2014 ===
2014 Arunachal Pradesh Legislative Assembly election : Ziro–Hapoli
Party	Candidate	Votes	%	±%
BJP	Tage Taki	8,885	52.74%	▲50.16
INC	Padi Richo	7,666	45.50%	▼10.39
NOTA	None of the Above	170	1.01%	New
NCP	Michi Tani	126	0.75%	▼1.66
Margin of victory		1,219	7.24%	▼9.54
Turnout		16,847	79.79%	▲7.83
Registered electors		21,113		▼11.26
BJP gain from INC		Swing	▼3.15	

=== Assembly Election 2009 ===
2009 Arunachal Pradesh Legislative Assembly election : Ziro–Hapoli
Party	Candidate	Votes	%	±%
INC	Padi Richo	9,569	55.89%	▲11.19
AITC	Nani Ribia	6,697	39.12%	New
BJP	Kuru Tai	442	2.58%	New
NCP	Subu Koyang	412	2.41%	New
Margin of victory		2,872	16.78%	▲6.18
Turnout		17,120	71.96%	▲4.57
Registered electors		23,791		▲24.42
INC gain from Independent		Swing	▲0.60	

=== Assembly Election 2004 ===
2004 Arunachal Pradesh Legislative Assembly election : Ziro–Hapoli
Party	Candidate	Votes	%	±%
Independent	Nani Ribia	7,125	55.30%	New
INC	Padi Richo	5,760	44.70%	▼5.09
Margin of victory		1,365	10.59%	▼15.86
Turnout		12,885	65.69%	▼0.78
Registered electors		19,121		▲17.24
Independent gain from INC		Swing		

=== Assembly Election 1999 ===
1999 Arunachal Pradesh Legislative Assembly election : Ziro–Hapoli
Party	Candidate	Votes	%	±%
INC	Padi Richo	5,536	49.79%	▲15.75
BJP	Nani Ribia	2,595	23.34%	New
AC	Tapi Batt	1,753	15.77%	New
Independent	Kuru Hasang	1,234	11.10%	New
Margin of victory		2,941	26.45%	▲24.48
Turnout		11,118	70.66%	▲1.81
Registered electors		16,309		▲0.09
INC gain from JP		Swing	▲13.78	

=== Assembly Election 1995 ===
1995 Arunachal Pradesh Legislative Assembly election : Ziro–Hapoli
Party	Candidate	Votes	%	±%
JP	Tapi Batt	3,894	36.01%	New
INC	Kuru Hasang	3,681	34.04%	▲9.36
JD	Padi Yubbe	3,238	29.95%	New
Margin of victory		213	1.97%	▼12.14
Turnout		10,813	68.24%	▲13.61
Registered electors		16,294		▼9.30
JP gain from Independent		Swing		

=== Assembly Election 1990 ===
1990 Arunachal Pradesh Legislative Assembly election : Ziro–Hapoli
Party	Candidate	Votes	%	±%
Independent	Padi Yubbe	4,237	44.71%	New
Independent	Nani Ribya	2,900	30.60%	New
INC	Gyati Takka	2,339	24.68%	▼0.73
Margin of victory		1,337	14.11%	▲12.99
Turnout		9,476	54.27%	▼16.51
Registered electors		17,964		▲7.60
Independent gain from INC		Swing		

=== Assembly Election 1984 ===
1984 Arunachal Pradesh Legislative Assembly election : Ziro–Hapoli
Party	Candidate	Votes	%	±%
INC	Gyati Takka	2,938	25.41%	New
Independent	Padi Yubbe	2,809	24.29%	New
BJP	Neelam Taram	2,470	21.36%	New
Independent	Bengia Tolum	2,151	18.60%	New
Independent	Bamin Kano	1,195	10.33%	New
Margin of victory		129	1.12%	▲0.49
Turnout		11,563	73.21%	▲15.89
Registered electors		16,695		▲7.52
INC gain from Independent		Swing	▼1.51	

=== Assembly Election 1980 ===
1980 Arunachal Pradesh Legislative Assembly election : Ziro–Hapoli
Party	Candidate	Votes	%	±%
Independent	Padi Yubbe	2,231	26.92%	New
PPA	Gyati Takka	2,179	26.29%	New
Independent	Neelam Taram	1,563	18.86%	New
INC(I)	Taso Grayu	1,563	18.86%	New
INC(U)	Nani Challa	274	3.31%	New
Independent	Kago Genda	241	2.91%	New
Independent	Hage Haley	236	2.85%	New
Margin of victory		52	0.63%	▼24.25
Turnout		8,287	58.65%	▼19.81
Registered electors		15,528		▲12.41
Independent gain from JP		Swing	▼17.88	

=== Assembly Election 1978 ===
1978 Arunachal Pradesh Legislative Assembly election : Ziro–Hapoli
Party	Candidate	Votes	%	±%
JP	Padi Yubbe	4,529	44.80%	New
Independent	Grati Takka	2,014	19.92%	New
Independent	Tanya Sala	1,659	16.41%	New
INC	Taso Grayu	720	7.12%	New
Independent	Bengia Hemanta	665	6.58%	New
Independent	Hage Haley	522	5.16%	New
Margin of victory		2,515	24.88%	
Turnout		10,109	75.61%	
Registered electors		13,814		
JP win (new seat)				

== See also ==
- List of constituencies of Arunachal Pradesh Legislative Assembly
- Arunachal Pradesh Legislative Assembly
