= St Claret College, Ziro =

College in Arunachal Pradesh, India

Coordinates: 27.5951°N 93.8498°E

Saint Claret College, Ziro
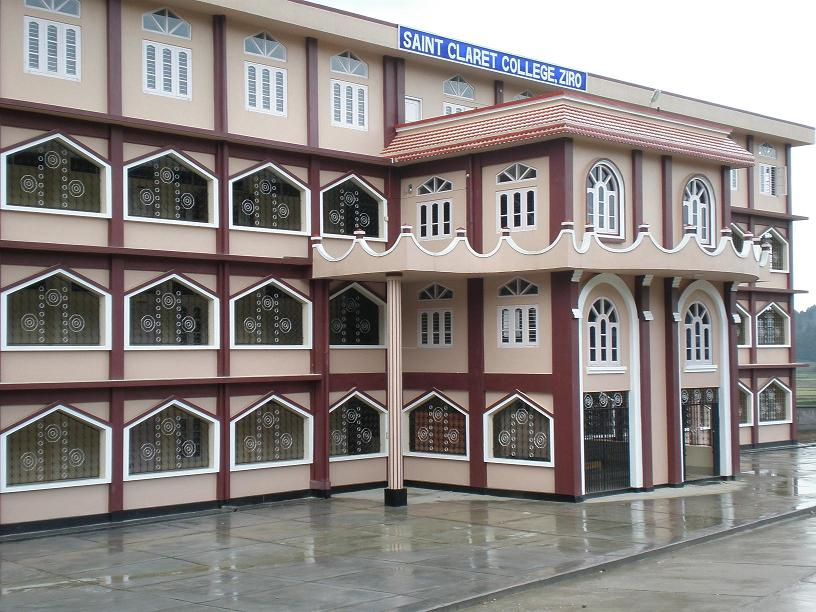
- Main campus building
- Type: Private, Co-educational
- Established: 2003
- Religious affiliation: Roman Catholic
- Academic affiliations: Rajiv Gandhi University
- Principal: Fr. Allwyn Mendoz CMF
- Location: Ziro, Arunachal Pradesh, India
- Campus: Rural
- Website: www.sccz.edu.in

Saint Claret College, Ziro (SCCZ) is a private Catholic college in Ziro, Lower Subansiri district, Arunachal Pradesh, India. It is affiliated to Rajiv Gandhi University (RGU), Itanagar. Saint Claret College has obtained autonomous status as recognised by the University Grants Commission (UGC), and is the first such private autonomous college in Arunachal Pradesh.

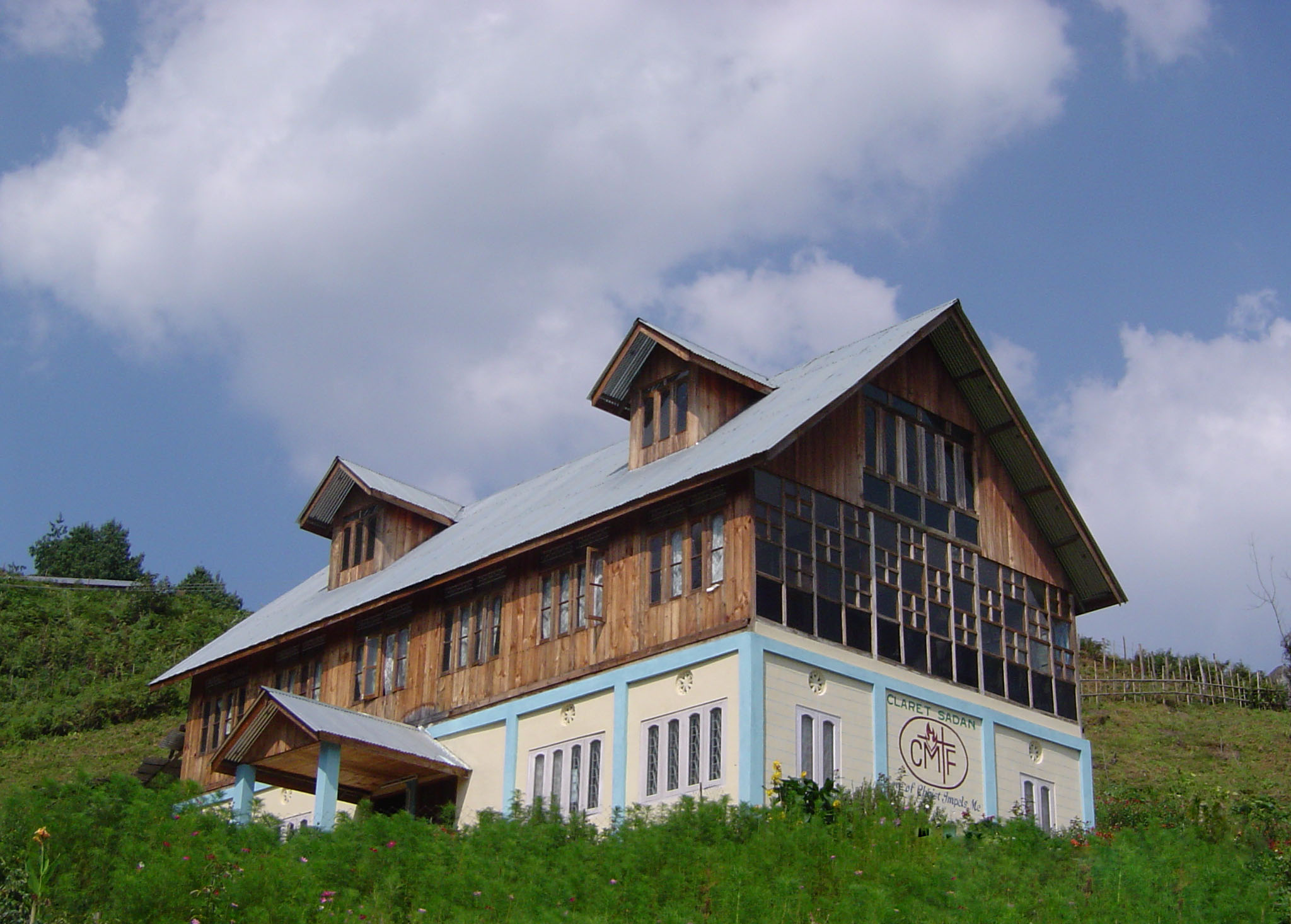
Principal's residence

== Overview ==
SCCZ was established in 2003 by Claretians of Northeast India at the invitation of the Apatani tribe and the Lower Subansiri district administration, on a 20-acre plot donated by Apatani clans in the "Salaya area", becoming the second private college in Arunachal Pradesh. Chief Minister Nabam Tuki has commended the Claretians for running three colleges in Arunachal Pradesh serving over 30,000 youths statewide.

SCCZ maintains ties with several institutions for academic and cultural exchange. Under a "Cultural Ambassadors" programme, the college sends student groups to partner institutions to present the cultures and traditions of Arunachal Pradesh; partner colleges including Nirmala Institute of Education in Panaji, St. Agnes College and St. Aloysius and Mangaluru, Mount Carmel College in Bengaluru. SCCZ additionally holds a MoU with the Claretian Team at the United Nations for promoting the Sustainable Development Goals and Education for Global Citizenship among staff and students, and a three-year research collaboration agreement with Gandhigram Rural Institute, Dindigul, covering geoinformatics, remote sensing, natural resource management, and disaster management. SCCZ also hosts a National Service Scheme (NSS) unit.

=== Ziro Literary Festival ===
SCCZ has co-organised the annual Ziro Literary Festival (ZLF) on its campus alongside the Ziro Festival of Music, since the first edition in 2018. This festival features discussions on culture, identity, and literary arts, attended by authors, activists and politicians such as Mmhonlumo Kikon.

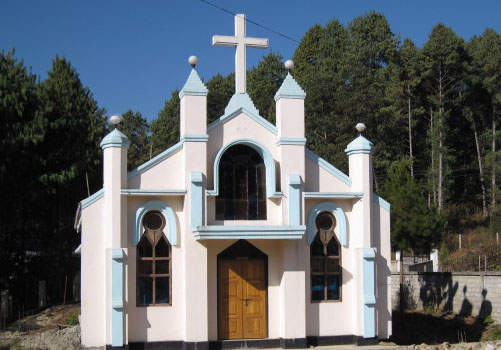
St. Claret Chapel

== Academics ==
Saint Claret is the first private college in Arunachal Pradesh to have been accredited with Grade A by the National Assessment and Accreditation Council (NAAC) across two successive cycles, and as of 2020 remained the only NAAC Grade A private college in the state. Other achievements include a "Commendation Certificate" from the state government presented by MP Tage Taki, and a "One District One Green Champion Award" from the Mahatma Gandhi National Council of Rural Education as part of the Union government's Swachh Bharat Mission.

SCCZ offers what it calls the "Claretine Holistic Education Programme (CHEP)", an experimental curriculum delivered one hour per week over 30 weeks, which aims to help the personal development of students alongside their schoolwork. It also publishes its own peer-reviewed journal, titled "InterViews: An Interdisciplinary Journal in Social Sciences".

The college's commencement ceremonies and seminars often collaborate with RGU, with graduates also participating in RGU examinations. The college's seminars are also attended by RGU staff and have occasionally been funded by NABARD

== Programmes and campus ==
Saint Claret College occupies a 20-acre rural campus and provides hostel residences for both male and female students. Facilities include a library, an auditorium, indoor and outdoor sports facilities, and gymnasium.

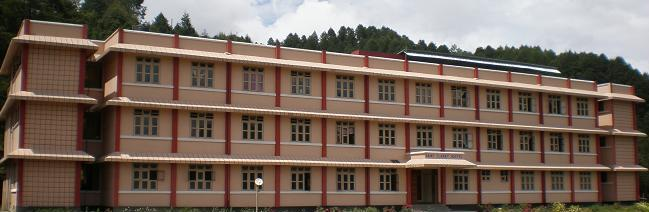
Women's residence hall

SCCZ offers the following programmes:

- Bachelor of Arts (BA) in anthropology, economics, education, English, history, geography, political science, and psychology
- Bachelor of Arts in mass communication
- Bachelor of Commerce (B.Com)
- Bachelor of Social Work (BSW)
- Bachelor of Business Administration (BBA)
- Master of Arts / Master of Science in geography
- Master of Arts in political science
