= Murung Festival =

Festival celebrated by the Apantis of Lower Subansiri, Arunachal Pradesh, India

Murung is the Festival of Prosperity, celebrated by the Apatanis of Lower Subansiri district in Arunachal Pradesh, India. Though an individual festival, whole villages and indeed the whole of the Apatani people get involved in the festival. It is celebrated in the Month of January or Murung piilo. Besides it the Apatanis also celebrate Myoko in the month of march and the Dree Festival from 4 to 7 July every year.

== Preparation ==
Pahin Konin (egg-examination) by a priest is the first step to performing of Muruing. It is followed by preparation of a special dish, known as Kaji, which is offered to the patient and relatives. If the patient recovers after it, Murung is performed; otherwise it is ignored. By the onset of winter relatives and neighbours collect firewood. materials including leaves and canes and bamboo are Collected a few days before beginning of main event. Mithuns and cows are tethered at house yard. The next step is selection of sacrificial animals after examination of chicken liver by the priest one day before the festival. It is followed by preparation of Subu-sa (cane rope) on the eve of the festival. Firewood stocked and dried in fields is shifted to the house. Soon after, rice beer prepared by clan-members is brought to Lapang is served to guests. During the day relatives and neighbours visit the family on the day. The priest chants narratives and prays for success of the festival. He also performs omen to decide persons to sacrifice animals in the festival.

== Preparatory events ==
1. Pahin Khonii
2. Kaji Diiho Nii
3. Yassang Panii
4. Yanii-Yasso Lanii
5. Subu-Sii Bokhung Nii
6. Anii Khonii
7. Sha Khiinii
8. Yasang Banii
9. Lapang O’ Miinii
10. Yatang Hunii
11. Lapang O’ Tanii
12. Atting-Allang Khonii.

== Main events of Murung ==
1) Talinii/Subu Hinii, 2) Embin Siiding Harnii, 3) Siikha Ranii/Yugyang Tanii, 4)Mida Inii, 5) Supung Nii, 6) Pachu Kohnii, 7) Subu-Sii Paniing, 8) Pukung Nii, 9) Embin Yakhang Binii, 10) Yorda Ayu Nii, 11) IIro O’ Khiinii, 12) Lemba Ronii (Rugu Nii), 13) Pukun Apin Honii, 14) Alyi Pachu Konii, 15) Dokho Ranii, 16) Dulu Panii, 17) Pingko Yo Khenii, 18) Penii Inii (Pelin Nii or Liling Nii), 19) Koter Chinii, 20) Dulu IIsan Lyoka siinii, 21) Dulu Koda Giinii, 22) Penii Inii Aping og Dulu Aping, 23) Nembu Anii (Hiirii Khanii), 24) Siibo Pahinii, 25) Tamu Lanii, 26) Ereh Pukung Nii, 27) Ude Tinii, 28) Nyibu Punii, 29) Konchi Aji Eya Nii, 30) More Bije Eya, 31) Allo Aji Eya Nii, 32) Empi Konii Early in the morning all animals are brought to Lapang where the priest chants prayer before sacrifice. Relatives attend the sacrificial ritual conducted at Lapang. Men decorate the animals with bamboo shaving materials and rice paste and rice beer. Assisted by a few helpers, chickens numbering same of mithuns are also sacrificed with chanting of narratives.

On the second day relatives and neighbours contribute rice, cash, meat, millet among other items while the hosts entertain them with meat and drinks.
