= Nyapin Assembly constituency =

Legislative Assembly constituency in Arunachal Pradesh, India

Coordinates: 27.74°N 93.31°E

Nyapin
- Constituency No. 19 for the Arunachal Pradesh Legislative Assembly

Constituency details
- Country: India
- Region: Northeast India
- State: Arunachal Pradesh
- District: Kurung Kumey
- Lok Sabha constituency: Arunachal West
- Established: 2008
- Total electors: 16,464
- Reservation: ST

Member of Legislative Assembly
- 11th Arunachal Pradesh Legislative Assembly
- Incumbent Tai Nikio
- Party: Bharatiya Janata Party

Nyapin Legislative Assembly constituency is one of the 60 Legislative Assembly constituencies of Arunachal Pradesh state in India.

It is part of Kurung Kumey district and is reserved for candidates belonging to the Scheduled Tribes. As of 2019, it is represented by Bamang Felix of the Bharatiya Janata Party.

== Members of the Legislative Assembly ==
Year	Member	Party
1990	Tadar Taniang	Indian National Congress
1995	Tadar Taniang	Indian National Congress
1999	Tatar Kipa	Indian National Congress
2004	Tatar Kipa	Indian National Congress
2009	Bamang Felix	Nationalist Congress Party
2014	Bamang Felix	Indian National Congress
2019	Bamang Felix	Bharatiya Janata Party
2024	Tai Nikio	Bharatiya Janata Party

== Election results ==
=== Assembly Election 2024 ===
2024 Arunachal Pradesh Legislative Assembly election : Nyapin
Party	Candidate	Votes	%	±%
BJP	Tai Nikio	7,896	54.01%	▲3.36
PPA	Tadar Mangku	6,714	45.92%	New
NOTA	None of the Above	10	0.07%	▼0.04
Margin of victory		1,182	8.08%	▲6.67
Turnout		14,620	88.80%	▲3.87
Registered electors		16,464		▲28.37
BJP hold		Swing	▲3.36	

=== Assembly Election 2019 ===
2019 Arunachal Pradesh Legislative Assembly election : Nyapin
Party	Candidate	Votes	%	±%
BJP	Bamang Felix	5,517	50.65%	New
INC	Tai Nikio	5,363	49.24%	New
NOTA	None of the Above	12	0.11%	New
Margin of victory		154	1.41%	
Turnout		10,892	84.93%	▲84.93
Registered electors		12,825		▲8.73
BJP gain from INC		Swing		

=== Assembly Election 2014 ===
2014 Arunachal Pradesh Legislative Assembly election : Nyapin
Party	Candidate	Votes	%	±%
INC	Bamang Felix	Unopposed		
Registered electors		11,795		▲14.60
INC gain from NCP		Swing		

=== Assembly Election 2009 ===
2009 Arunachal Pradesh Legislative Assembly election : Nyapin
Party	Candidate	Votes	%	±%
NCP	Bamang Felix	4,865	54.11%	New
INC	Tatar Kipa	4,126	45.89%	▲0.12
Margin of victory		739	8.22%	▲6.06
Turnout		8,991	87.36%	▲23.52
Registered electors		10,292		▼20.75
NCP gain from INC		Swing		

=== Assembly Election 2004 ===
2004 Arunachal Pradesh Legislative Assembly election : Nyapin
Party	Candidate	Votes	%	±%
INC	Tatar Kipa	3,794	45.77%	▼23.10
AC	Bamang Felix	3,615	43.61%	▲12.47
BJP	Tai Tagak	881	10.63%	New
Margin of victory		179	2.16%	▼35.57
Turnout		8,290	60.64%	▼3.71
Registered electors		12,986		▲15.47
INC hold		Swing		

=== Assembly Election 1999 ===
1999 Arunachal Pradesh Legislative Assembly election : Nyapin
Party	Candidate	Votes	%	±%
INC	Tatar Kipa	5,231	68.87%	▲27.81
AC	Tako Changriang	2,365	31.13%	New
Margin of victory		2,866	37.73%	▲30.71
Turnout		7,596	69.37%	▼2.77
Registered electors		11,246		▲6.01
INC hold		Swing		

=== Assembly Election 1995 ===
1995 Arunachal Pradesh Legislative Assembly election : Nyapin
Party	Candidate	Votes	%	±%
INC	Tadar Taniang	3,062	41.05%	▲9.62
JD	Tatar Kipa	2,538	34.03%	▲3.99
JP	Tadar Tang	1,859	24.92%	▲2.91
Margin of victory		524	7.03%	▲5.62
Turnout		7,459	71.59%	▼2.43
Registered electors		10,608		▲8.24
INC hold		Swing		

=== Assembly Election 1990 ===
1990 Arunachal Pradesh Legislative Assembly election : Nyapin
Party	Candidate	Votes	%	±%
INC	Tadar Taniang	2,241	31.43%	New
JD	Kamen Ringu	2,141	30.03%	New
JP	Tai Nikam	1,569	22.01%	New
Independent	Tadar Tang	1,178	16.52%	New
Margin of victory		100	1.40%	
Turnout		7,129	74.91%	
Registered electors		9,800		
INC win (new seat)				

== See also ==
- List of constituencies of the Arunachal Pradesh Legislative Assembly
- Kurung Kumey district
