= Yapak =

Coordinates: 27.866°N 93.476°E

Yapak is a village near Koloriang in Kurung Kumey district in Arunachal Pradesh. Its residents are the Bengia clan of Nyishi tribe. The village headman is Bengia Chanang. The Payu river supports the needs of the community and it is believed that river is the blessing of the sun god.
