= Kurung =

Kurung may refer to:

- Kurung Kumey district, one of the 17 districts of the northeastern Indian state of Arunachal Pradesh
- Kurung River in Arunachal Pradesh
- Kurung language, see Gurung language
- Baju Kurung, a traditional Malay costume
