= Tai Nikio =

Member of Arunachal Pradesh Legislative Assembly
- Incumbent
- Assumed office 1 June 2024
- Preceded by: Bamang Felix
- Constituency: Nyapin

Personal details
- Born: 1969 (age 56–57)
- Party: Bharatiya Janata Party

Tai Nikio is an Indian politician from Arunachal Pradesh belonging to the Bharatiya Janata Party. He is a member of the 11th Arunachal Pradesh Legislative Assembly from the Nyapin constituency. He won the 2024 Arunachal Pradesh Legislative Assembly election over the PPA's candidate Tadar Mangku, with 7896 votes.
