= Padi Richo =

Indian politician

President, Arunachal Pradesh Congress Committee
- In office 12 July 2014 – 14 March 2017
- Preceded by: Mukut Mithi
- Succeeded by: Takam Sanjoy

Member of the Arunachal Pradesh Legislative Assembly
- In office 2008–2016
- Succeeded by: Tage Taki
- Constituency: Ziro-Hapoli

Personal details
- Born: 22 August 1965 (age 61) Ziro, Lower Subansiri district, North-East Frontier Agency, India
- Party: Indian National Congress

Padi Richo is a politician who hails from Arunachal Pradesh state in India. He served in the Arunachal Pradesh Legislative Assembly as member representing Ziro-Hapoli constituency in the Lower Subansiri district. He is a member of Indian National Congress political party. Tage Taki succeeds him as MLA of Ziro-Hapoli as of October 2016.

== Political career ==
=== President of the Arunachal Pradesh Congress Committee ===
Richo was appointed president of the Arunachal Pradesh Congress Committee (APCC) on 12 July 2014 after Mukut Mithi. The post was confirmed by the Congress president Sonia Gandhi. At the time he was nominated as the president of APCC, he was one of the prominent leaders of Congress and had previously been cabinet minister and MLA from Ziro-Hapoli constituency. He had previously held several posts within the organization including being member of the All India Congress Committee, general secretary & vice-president of Pradesh Congress Committee and also a member of national executive committee of Indian Youth Congress. He is the convenor of North-East chapter of Indian National Trade Union Congress (INTUC) and also the president of its Arunachal Pradesh branch since 2004.

=== Appointment in 2025 ===
As per an announcement made on 31st July 2025 by the Indian National Congress, the Political Affairs Committee and Coordination Committee of Arunachal Pradesh Congress Committee have been constituted. Richo has been appointed as a member in both these committees. This decision has been made effective immediately.
