= Tage Rita =

Indian agricultural engineer (born 1981)

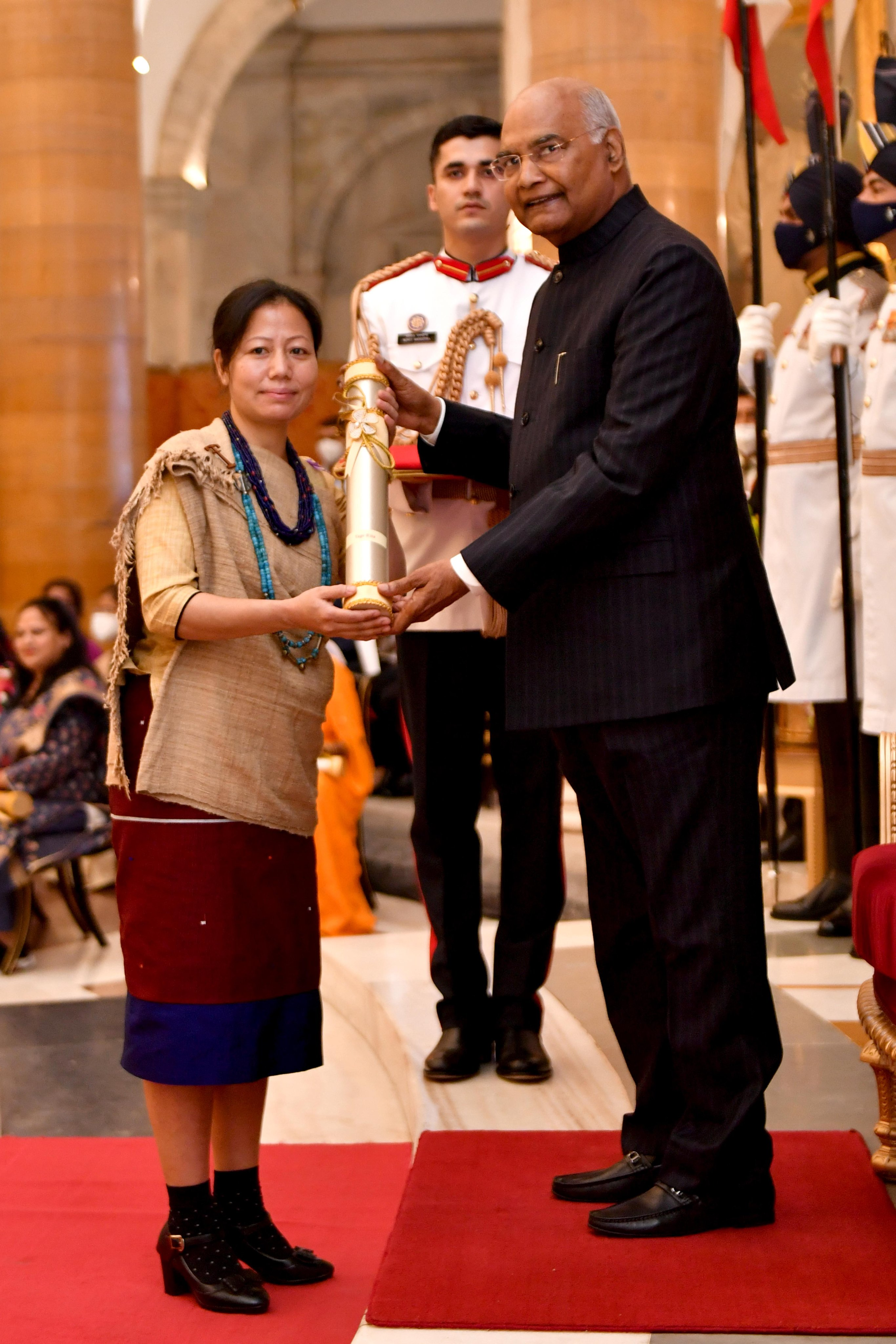
- Receiving the Nari Shakti Puraskar for "excellence in promoting women entrepreneurship and local products" in 2022
- Born: January 26, 1981 (age 45); Ziro, Arunachal Pradesh, India
- Other name: Tage Rita Takhe
- Occupation: Agricultural Engineer
- Known for: India's first kiwi wine brewer
- Spouse: Takhe Tamo
- Children: 4
- Awards: Women Transforming India Awards 2018, Nari Shakti Puraskar 2022.
- Website: www.naaraaaba.com

Tage Rita is an agricultural engineer from Ziro Valley and India's first Kiwi wine brewer. In 2018 she was honored with the Women Transforming India Awards, organized by the United Nations and NITI Aayog.

== Early life and education ==
Tage Rita Takhe was born in the Ziro Valley in Arunachal Pradesh. She belongs to the Apatani tribe. She studied and was trained as an agricultural engineer at NERIST (North Eastern Regional Institute of Science and Technology) in Nirjuli, Arunachal Pradesh.

== Career ==
In 2017 Rita invested in a boutique winery - Naara Aaba. In doing so, she also found the solution to a local problem. She would brew wine from Kiwi, a fruit that was found in abundance in the valley where she lived. She sourced the organic fruit from her orchard and the Kiwi Growers Cooperative Society in Arunachal Pradesh. The farming sector gained assured buyers. Her winemaking process follows traditional methods. It took her six years of research and planning to prepare the right procedure and the correct concoction. The winery has scaled its capacity since 2017 from 20,000 litres to 60,000 litres of wine production currently through 16 tanks. The first year of wine production alone supported 300 farmers and brought them back to the kiwi orchards, as they sold around 20 metric tons(20,000 kg) of kiwis to the winery. The process takes about four months from crushing the raw material to bottling. The wine tastes best between six and eight degrees Celsius.

== Awards and recognition ==
On International Women's Day 2022, she received the 2020 Nari Shakti Puraskar from President Ram Nath Kovind. The award is organised annually by the Ministry of Women and Child Development to recognise the women who create or inspire change. The ceremony had been postponed because of the COVID-19 pandemic and the ceremony included 72 women vaccinators who had excelled in their work.

- North East Entrepreneur Award
- Winner of the Women Transforming India Awards 2018, organized by the United Nations and NITI Aayog
- Women Transforming India Awards 2018 by NITI AAYOG in Collaboration with United Nations.
- Felicitation and Citation by Governor of Arunachal Pradesh, Brig. Dr. B.D. Mishra (Retd) on 26 October 2018
- Recipient of Vasundhara Award from Sreemanta Sankara Mission (SSM) Guwahati-2017
- Awarded a pioneer women entrepreneur of Ziro, Lower Subansiri District of Arunachal Pradesh by Helping Hands, a Delhi based NGO headed by Shri Robin Hibu (IPS), 2017.
- Awarded Innovative Entrepreneur- 2017 by SMILE ZIRO, a NGO of Ziro valley.
- Felicitation of and Certificate of Appriciation-2020 by the Department of Women and Child Development, Govt. of Arunachal Pradesh.
- CNBC-18 (a TV channel) made a short story for the International Women's Day 2019 for special telecast.
- Certificate of Appreciation by Bharatiya Janata Yuva Morcha, 2020.
- AYA Award-2018 by Apatani youth Association - This is a 40 years old youth organization of Ziro Valley.
- ANNYO Award-2019 by a village based youth organization which works towards social harmony and protection of wild life.
- Nominated for 13th National Women Excellence Award-2020 by the Indo European Chamber of Commerce.
