= Lempia =

Coordinates: 27.605°N 93.833°E

Lempia is a village near Ziro in Lower Subansiri district of Arunachal Pradesh
