= National Highway 229 (India, old numbering) =

Old numbering of road in India

National Highway 229

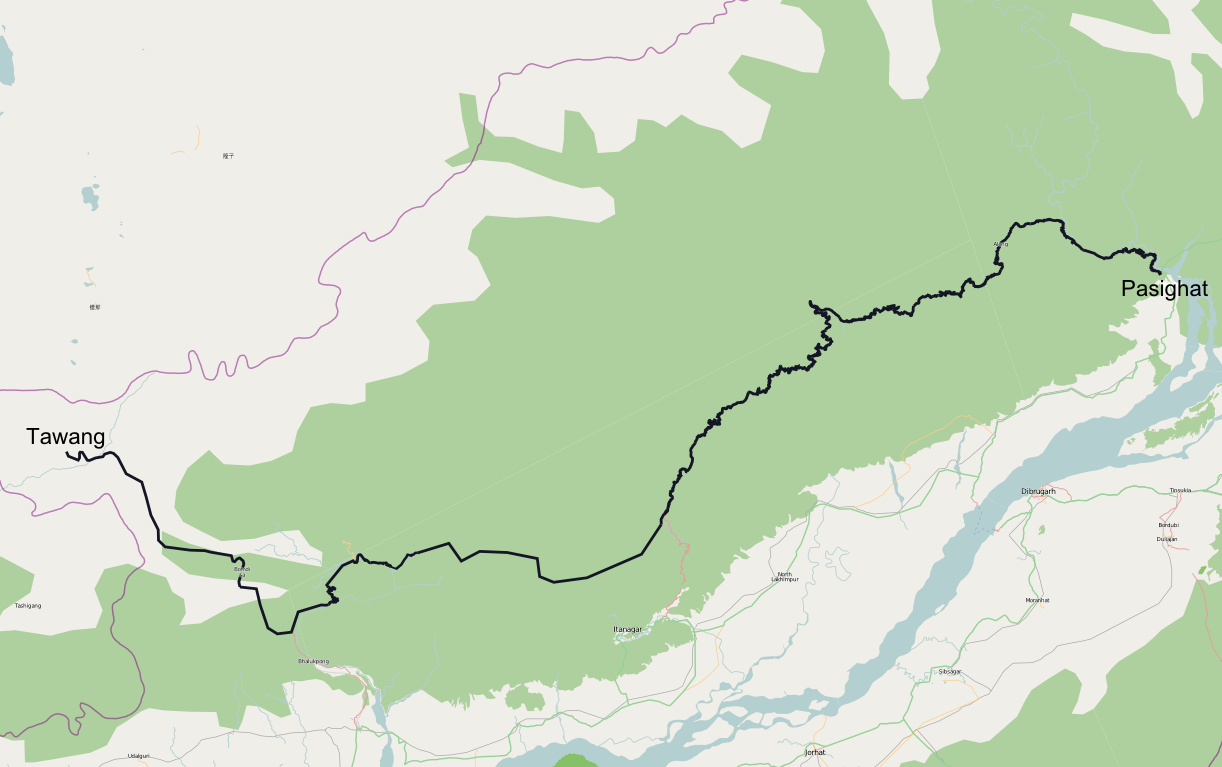

Route information
- Length: 1,090 km (680 mi)

Major junctions
- From: Tawang, Arunachal Pradesh
- To: Pasighat, Arunachal Pradesh

Location
- Country: India
- States: Arunachal Pradesh: 1090 km
- Primary destinations: Tawang - Bomdila - Seppa - Ziro - Daporijo - Along - Pasighat

Highway system
- Roads in India; Expressways; National; State; Asian

National Highway 229 (NH 229) is an Indian National Highway located entirely within the state of Arunachal Pradesh. It originates at Tawang in the western corner of the state, runs mostly eastwards for 1090 km and terminates at NH 52 in Pasighat.

== Route ==
- Tawang
- Bomdila
- Seppa
- Ziro
- Daporijo
- Along
- Pasighat

== See also ==
- List of national highways in India
