= Hage Appa =

Indian politician

Member of Arunachal Pradesh Legislative Assembly
- Incumbent
- Assumed office 1 June 2024
- Preceded by: Tage Taki
- Constituency: Ziro-Hapoli

Personal details
- Party: Bharatiya Janata Party

Hage Appa (born 1962) is an Indian politician from Arunachal Pradesh. He is a member of the 11th Arunachal Pradesh Legislative Assembly from the Bharatiya Janata Party representing the Ziro-Hapoli Assembly constituency in the Lower Subansiri district. He won the election unopposed.

== Education ==
He graduated from the University of Allahabad in Civil Engineering in the year 1984.
