= Nyapin =

Nyapin Nyoping
- Sub Division
- Nyapin
- Interactive map of Nyapin
- Country: India
- State: Arunachal Pradesh
- District: Kurung Kumey

Area
  - Land: 275 km^{2} (106 sq mi)

Population (2011)
  - Total: 6,651
- Time zone: 5.30 IST
  - Summer (DST): 5.30
- 791118: 791118
- Area code: 791118
- ISO 3166 code: IN-AR

Nyapin, known as Nyoping to the natives, is a subdivision of the Kurung Kumey district in the Indian state of Arunachal Pradesh.

== Overview ==
Nyapin is located 56 km south of Koloriang, the headquarters of the district. It has an agrarian economy consisting mostly of paddy cultivation and "tumph-rungo" (jhum cultivation). Recently, people have also started cultivating spices such as cardamom for higher returns. Chili peppers, king chillis, brinjal, cucumbers, ragi, maize, and green leafy vegetables are also produced in Nyapin.

Nyapin is divided broadly into Upper Nyapin and Lower Nyapin. The people of Nyapin consist of various clans, such as the Gyamar, Tadar, Kipa, Tarh, and Tai clans. Nyapin is a Nyishi-dominated area, where people practice Christianity and Donyi-Poloism. Nyokum, the harvesting festival of the Nyishi, is profoundly celebrated; Christmas is also observed Christian neighbourhoods. Nyapin is one of the 60 constituencies of the Legislative Assembly of Arunachal Pradesh.

As of August 2022, the current Member of the Legislative Assembly of Nyapin constituency is Bamang Felix.

== Climates ==
Nyapin has a subtropical highland climate (Cwb in the Köppen climate classification). Summers are warm with very high rainfall; winters are mild with moderate rainfall. It is very hilly with high geographical terrain. Most of the time it is covered by clouds. The area is windy in nature.

== See also ==
- List of constituencies of Arunachal Pradesh Legislative Assembly
- Arunachal Pradesh Legislative Assembly
