= Yachuli =

- Village
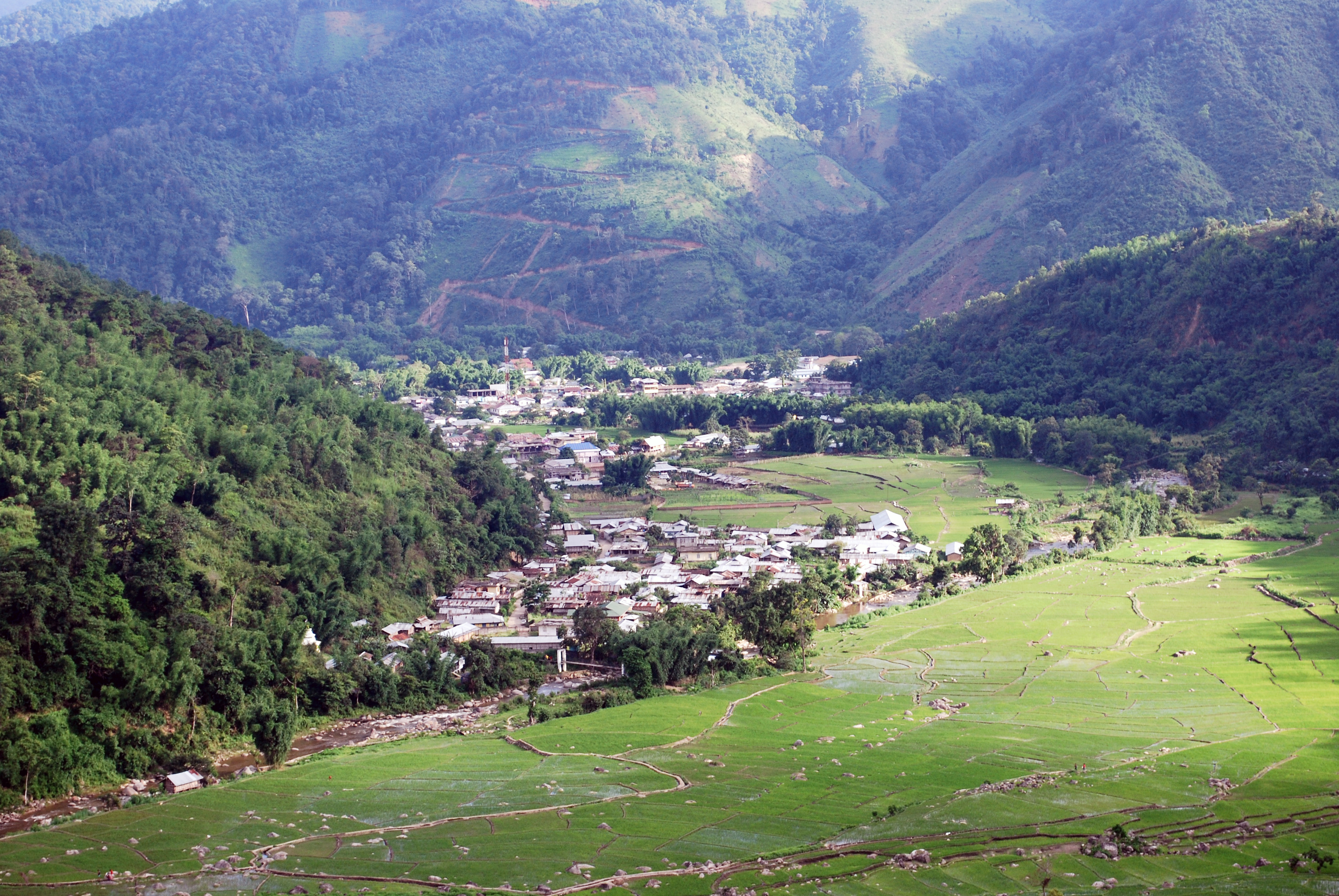

- Location within Arunachal Pradesh Location within India
- Coordinates: 27.5142117°N 93.7809663°E
- Country: India
- State: Arunachal Pradesh
- District: Keyi Panyor

Yachuli is a village in the Indian state of Arunachal Pradesh. It is the headquarters of Keyi Panyor district.

Yachuli is located 10 km (6.2 mi) south of the district headquarters of Ziro. It is one of the 60 constituencies of Legislative Assembly of Arunachal Pradesh. The current Member of the Legislative Assembly for this constituency (as of August 2016) is Taba Tedir.

== See also ==
- List of constituencies of Arunachal Pradesh Legislative Assembly
- Arunachal Pradesh Legislative Assembly
