= Hapoli =

Coordinates: 27.538°N 93.818°E

Hapoli is a locality in the town of Ziro, the headquarters of Lower Subansiri district, Arunachal Pradesh, India. The Apatanis are the natives of this place and also form the majority of the population. The name Hapli is said to have been derived from Hao-Polyang, by which name the Apatanis still know it. Literally, "hao" means high or above and "polyang" means plain or plateau.

The administrative offices of the district are located Hapoli. Hapoli serves as the commercial hub of Lower Subansiri district and boasts a large number of schools both government and private where students from all over the state come to study. Hapoli is divided into several zones, including the Medical Colony, Engineering Colony and SSB gate.
