= Dollungmukh =

Circle in Arunachal Pradesh, India

Dollungmukh is a circle in the Lower Subansiri of Arunachal Pradesh, India. Its name means "land of two river mouths", referring to the Dollung and the Subansiri. It is inhabited by Nyishi people.
