= Dree Festival =

Indian religious and agricultural festival

The Apatanis who inhabit a tranquil pine clad valley called Ziro at the core of Lower Subansiri District of Arunachal Pradesh, are famous for their unique practice of wet rice cultivation. They are also known for their sustainable agricultural practices and the agricultural cycles govern their everyday lives. The agricultural festival of Dree is the highlight in this cycle.

== Mythological aspects ==
In the beginning, humans wandered around foraging for food. It was Anii Donii and Abba Liibo who began cultivation in the fertile lands of IIpyo supuñ. Thus Anii Donii was the first human to start a settled life while Abba Liibo was the first to start cultivation.

With the first batch of spades – Turú dipe and the first batch of machetes – Tiigyó ilyo', bushes and vegetations were cleared from large tracts of land. Invoking the winds from the north and the south, the leavings were burnt. Next, the soil was prepared for sowing.

Plots of agriculture were ready, but no paddy seeds were available. So, the search for the seeds begun. In the process, Anii Donii and Abba Lwbo reached Murtú Lembyañ from where they obtained the seeds of pyapiñ and pyare varieties of paddy along with the seeds of cucumber and corns from Murtú Yariñ. Something was still lacking and the search continued. When Anẁ̀ Donw and Abba Liibo looked into the stomach of the wild rats it was full of grasses and herbs while that of the wild boar was full of salyó and sankhe'. However, it was in the stomach of the dilyañ kubu – the field rat that they found the seeds of empu and elañ varieties of paddy. They trailed the field rat with the help of a dog and finally located the source of the seeds. At a place called Hirii Lyandiñ, the paddy seeds were found stuck high above on the branches of Hirii Tanguñ tree, along with tayú and tagyá – varieties of bees. Thus, the empú and elañ were obtained from Hirii Anii.

All the varieties of paddy – pyapiñ and pyare, obtained from Murtu as well as empu and elañ, obtained from Hirii were originally obtained from Hintii Anii.

When Anii Donii and Abba Liibo set out to sow the seeds in IIpyo Supuñ, rains and storms came to disturb them. They overcame them, equipped with baskets of taser and rain guards of tarpì. Then, Anii Donii and Abba Lwbo were constantly disturbed in their cultivation works and their life made miserable by a demon named Pyokuñ Pembò Pyoyi Tadù. This demon was finally eliminated with great efforts but their struggle was far from over. From the stomach of Pyokuñ Pembò Pyoyi Tadù emerged swarms of insects, pests and rice eating birds. They attacked the crops in the fields which led to poor harvest, and subsequent hunger and famines.

It was in order to counter the menace of insects, pests and diseases, and to alleviate the impending hunger and famines that a series of rituals were observed in the month of Dree. Achí Kharii or Dulu Talañ Myama Pwkha was the first priest, who was assisted by a committee called the Dree Pontañ. This committee consisted of Huli Gorì Hula Gora – the village committee, Huní Mitur Huna Mikiñ - the learned and wise village elders, Kharii Khatii - the high priests and Gwtú Gwra - the general public. They collected voluntary donations from every household to meet the requirements of the Dree rituals.

Pyodu Au and Dree Yarii are believed to be the forces that cause scarcity of food and bring hunger and sufferings to humanity. The damage caused to crops by insects and pests, together with hunger brought by Pyodu Au and Dree Yarii lead to famine. Thus, the Dree rituals are observed to ward off these forces during June–July, corresponding to Dree Pwlo of the Apatanis.

Dree rituals are the Tamù, Metii, Meder and Mepiñ. The Tamù is propitiated to ward off the insects and pests. The Metii is propitiated to ward off epidemics and other ailments of the human beings. The purification ritual of Meder is performed to cleanse the agricultural fields of unfavorable elements. This series of rituals is concluded with Mepiñ, which is performed to seek blessings for healthy crops and well-being of mankind. In the modern Dree, the Danyi is also propitiated for fertility of the soil, abundance of aquatic lives in the rice fields, healthy cattle and for prosperity of all human beings.

In the olden days, each village performed Dree rites separately at their respective villages on different dates as per the convenience of the village level organizing committees. It was in the year 1967 that the senior students of Apatani society led by Shri Lod Kojee organised the Dree centrally at a common ground at Siilañ Ditiñ for the first time. Since then, celebration during taboo period takes place centrally with fun and gaiety. Competitions of iisañ - high jump and giibii – traditional wrestling for youths are organised, while the ladies engaged themselves in damiñda - folk dance competition. The elders exhibit their knowledge with ayú and bwsi competitions.

While the modes of celebration have changed with time, the original rituals started by the ancestors in IIpyó Supuñ are meticulously followed until this day and the objective of the festival remains the same – for a healthy crop, a bumper harvest and overall prosperity of mankind.

== The ritual ==
During the Dree festival, five main deities are appeased. These are; Tamù, Metii, Meder, Mepiñ and Danyi.

1. Tamu - It is propitiated to ward off the insects and pests..
2. Metii - It is propitiated to ward off epidemics and other ailments of the human beings.
3. Meder - It is a purification ritual performed to cleanse the agricultural fields of unfavorable elements.
4. Mepiñ - It is performed to seek blessings for healthy crops and well-being of mankind.
5. Danyi – Danyi is also propitiated for fertility of the soil, abundance of aquatic lives in the rice fields, healthy cattle and for prosperity of all human beings. Earlier, the Danyi was not performed during the Dree rituals, it was for first time introduced in 1967 a to sacrifice a Mithun donated by Late Millo Kacho.

== Modification ==
It was in the later part of April 1967. After attending the Mopin festival at Pasighat town that the then students, Shri Lod Kojee and his friends studying in Jawaharlal Nehru College Pasighat, in course of an informal chat felt the need for having a festival centrally organised for the Apatanis. The Apatani society has half a dozen of pujas and festivals performed individually and collectively throughout the year but not a single puja or festival was performed at a central location on a fixed date participated by the entire community like those of Bihu of Assamese community, the Diwali of Hindus, the Solung and Mopin of Adi and Galo community, and so on. Accordingly, the possibilities of modification of few pujas and festivals of the Apatani at a centralised place on a uniformly fixed date was discussed. Due to the mythological rigidities, the modification of the pujas and festivals were not possible, but after long and hard persuasions the Dree was selected for modified celebration at a centralised location without affecting its traditional identity. Earlier, each village had its own choice of dates for commencement of the Dree. As per the modified programme, the date of centralised celebration was fixed on 5 to 7 July every year. Therefore, the village level traditional ritual performance takes place on the eve of the general celebration, i.e., on 4 July so that on the following day all the priest representatives from each village of the valley can participate in the centrally installed festival altar at general Dree ground. Since then the Dree festival is being centrally celebrated by the entire people of Apatani on 5 July every year at Nenchalya near Old Ziro.

== Financial sources ==
It was the middle part of May 1967. The summer vacation of J N College Pasighat had already started. Before leaving for home the students of ziro divided amongst themselves into two groups. One group would go to Ziro and collect contributions or donations in kinds like mithun, goat, fowl, eggs, rice and other necessary materials for the celebration. The second group led by shri Lod Kojee was to proceed to Shillong for approaching the then NEFA Administration for financial assistance. At Shillong they apprised their proposal to Shri Jikom Riba the then special Social and Cultural Officer of North East Frontier Agency Administration. He led them to Shri P.N. Luthra the then Adviser to the Governor of Assam who granted them a sum of Rs 1000/= (Rupees one thousand) being the financial help towards the proposed Dree festival celebration and also he had consented to grace the occasion as chief guest.

== Selection of Dree venue ==
One sunny day in the early part of June 1967, a public meeting was convened at Old Ziro which was chaired by late R.S. Nag the then Deputy Commissioner of Subansiri District. All Gaon Buras, public leaders and senior students of the valley attended the meeting. The meeting was a crucial one as it was regarding the selection of Dree venue, no decision could arrive at easily until afternoon.

The people of Reru, Tajang and Kalung Villages proposed that the Dree venue should be at Lajbogya(Place), near Bulla School. The people of Hari Village suggested that the Dree venue be at Byara(Place), near Hari school. The people of Hong Village demanded that the Dree venue should be at Hanoko(Place) near Hong school. The people of Mudang Tage and Michi- Bamin Village suggested that let the venue be at Biirii (Place), between Hong school and Mudang-Tage villages, while the people from Dutta and Hija Village suggested that the venue be at Nenchanglya, near Hija School. Finally, a decision was taken that the Dree venue should be selected at such a place that fulfills the following conditions;

1. The Venue must be a centrally located in the valley.
2. It must have easy access of conveyance.
3. It must have a good play ground with sufficient areas for construction of sheds for huge gathering.

These conditions were agreed by all and decided that all representatives should visit the spots physically in the next day to ascertain as to which place fulfils the above-mentioned conditions. In the next day, it was reported that Nenchanglya, near Hija schools fulfills all the conditions and was finally selected as central Dree ground.

== Ritual performance turns to a festival ==
In olden days the Dree was observed on different days according to the convenience of the concerned 'Dree Goras' or 'Pontangs' (an organising committee at village level). It could not be called as festival in true sense, rather it was a ritual performed by the Apatanis. However, Dree Biisi (traditional folk song) amongst the girls, and games and sports like wrestling, high jumps etc. amongst the boys took place in the village level though they were not in a large scale as it is today. Now it is the biggest festival in Apatani valley, which is celebrated at other places as well where ever the Apatanis live.

== The Dree as it is celebrated today ==
On 4 July in the evening the Dree priest traditionally inaugurates the Dree festival in their respected villages. Next day on 5 July, Dree is officially solemnized and celebrated at common ground with traditional gaiety after it is inaugurated by a Chief Guest unfurling the Dree flag followed by Dree Anthem sung by group of artistes. Everybody present are served with Dree Taku (cucumber), Dree 'O' (rice or millet beer) followed by community feast. To add colour to the celebration the Pri-Dances, Daminda and other folk dances are displayed. The modern dance/song, literary competition, games and sports competitions are other high light of the days. During the taboo period women folks visits the home of their elderly relatives and present them with wine as a token of love and respect, and to strengthen their relationship.

== Additional sources ==
1. Dree and its modification, By Shri Lod Kojee. Published in the Souvenir of the Central Dree Committee, Ziro of 1992, the year in which silver jubilee of the Dree Festival celebration was observed.

2. The Dree, an agricultural community festival of Apatanis and its importance, By Shri Tage Dibo. Article published in The Arunachal Times on 4 July 2009.

3. The rising faith of the Apatanis, By Shri Mihin Kaning. Article published in The Echo of Arunachal on 31 December 2005.
