= Daminda =

Daminda is both a given name and a surname. Notable people with the name include:

- Daminda Kolugala (born 1972), Sri Lankan cricketer
- Daminda Ranawaka (born 1983), Sri Lankan cricketer
- Daminda Ranaweera (born 1980) Sri Lankan cricketer
- Dinesh Daminda (born 1983), Sri Lankan cricketer
