= Tarun Chandra Pamegam =

Tarun Chandra Pamegam (16 August 1924 – 30 August 1983) was an Assamese writer. He wrote in Assamese language and Mising language. He was the vice-president of Asom Sahitya Sabha in 1975.

== Works ==
Pamegam is known for several works. Xetu (Assamese: সেতু) is a radio play which won national awards. Mising Xokolor Loko Git is a book about Mising folk music.

== Life ==
Tarun Chandra Pamegam was born on 16 August 1924 in the village Borganya No 2 in the sub-division of Majuli in the Sivasagar district. He was the eldest son of Budhbor and Guneswari Pamegam. He died on 30 August 1983.
