= Moje Riba =

Indian freedom fighter

Moje Riba (1890–1982) was an Indian freedom fighter who contributed to the Indian independence movement. He was the first INC President of Arunachal Pradesh. On 15 August 1974, he was awarded the Tamra Patra by the then Governor of Arunachal Pradesh K. A. A. Raja at Shillong, for his sacrifice and contribution in the freedom movement. He died in 1982 at his residence in Daring village.
