= Tarung Pabin =

Indian politician from Arunachal Pradesh

Member of the Arunachal Pradesh Legislative Assembly for 37-Pasighat West (ST)
- In office 1990–1995

Personal details
- Born: Mirem Village, East Siang district, Arunachal Pradesh, India
- Party: Indian National Congress
- Occupation: Politician

Tarung Pabin is an Indian politician who served as a member of the Arunachal Pradesh Legislative Assembly representing the 37-Pasighat West (ST) constituency on behalf of the Indian National Congress (INC). He hails from Mirem Village in East Siang district and belongs to the Adi community, the predominant indigenous group of eastern Arunachal Pradesh. His election in 1990 placed him among the first cohort of legislators to serve the state after it attained full statehood.

== Background and community ==
Tarung Pabin comes from Mirem Village in East Siang district, situated in the eastern foothills of the Himalayas in Arunachal Pradesh. He is a member of the Adi community, one of the largest and most historically rooted tribal groups in the state. The Adi people are predominantly settled across East Siang, Upper Siang, West Siang, and parts of Lower Dibang Valley, and their languages belong to the Tibeto-Burman language family. The community is well known for its highly organised village governance system known as the Kebang, which functions as a traditional village council and has remained a living institution across Adi settlements.

The Adi people celebrate several important festivals, among them Solung, Aran, and Etor. The Etor festival features the Ponung dance performed by men of the community in the Dere, the traditional community hall, while the Aran dance is performed to drive away evil spirits from villages. Traditional Adi dress is colourful and vibrant, with women wearing the Gale (a sarong) and the Galuk (a blouse) accompanied by silver ornaments, while men wear the Lubling coat, the Ugon loincloth, and a neck ornament called the Dudap.

The constituency Pabin represented takes its name from Pasighat, the headquarters of East Siang district and the oldest town in Arunachal Pradesh. Pasighat was founded in 1911 by the British Raj as an administrative centre for the Abor Hills region and has long served as the cultural and institutional heart of the Adi-inhabited lowlands along the Siang River. The town's name derives from the Pasi, a sub-group of the Adi people who were among its earliest inhabitants. Among several institutional firsts credited to Pasighat are Arunachal Pradesh's first airfield, established near the town in 1946, its first Agricultural Institute, set up in 1950, and the state's first All India Radio station, launched there in 1966.

== Political context ==
The political landscape in which Tarung Pabin emerged as a legislator was shaped fundamentally by Arunachal Pradesh's constitutional transformation from a frontier territory into a full state of the Indian Union. The region had originally been administered as the North-East Frontier Agency (NEFA) during the colonial period. On 20 January 1972 it was renamed Arunachal Pradesh and constituted as a union territory. Full statehood followed on 20 February 1987, when the State of Arunachal Pradesh Act, 1986, enacted through the 55th Amendment to the Indian Constitution, came into force under the government of Prime Minister Rajiv Gandhi, making Arunachal Pradesh the 24th state of India. The Act fixed the size of the new state's Legislative Assembly at sixty members elected by direct ballot, with fifty-nine of those sixty seats reserved for Scheduled Tribe candidates, reflecting the overwhelmingly tribal composition of the state's population.

East Siang district, where Pabin was born and where his constituency is located, contains five of those sixty assembly seats: Panging, Nari-Koyu, Pasighat West, Pasighat East, and Mebo. All five constituencies are part of the Arunachal East Lok Sabha constituency. Pasighat West, designated constituency number 37 and reserved for Scheduled Tribe candidates, covers the western portions of Pasighat town and its surrounding villages. Since the constituency first contested elections in 1978, the Indian National Congress has held the seat on six occasions, with the Bharatiya Janata Party winning it once, reflecting the Congress party's long-established hold over this part of East Siang.

== 1990 election ==
The election held in February 1990 was the first to be conducted for the full sixty-seat Legislative Assembly following the implementation of full statehood. A total of 170 candidates from various political parties contested across all sixty constituencies. Of the 60 seats, 59 were reserved for Scheduled Tribe candidates and one was reserved for the general category. A total of 3,40,098 valid votes were cast across the state. The Indian National Congress secured a commanding majority, winning 37 of the 60 seats and forming the government, while the Janata Dal won 11 seats and the Janata Party won only one. The result kept Chief Minister Gegong Apang, who had led the state's administration since 1980, in office for a further full term. During that term the Arunachal Pradesh Vidhan Sabha passed several significant pieces of legislation, including the Arunachal Pradesh University Amendment Act of 1993, the Central Laws (Extension to Arunachal Pradesh) Act of 1993, the Arunachal Pradesh Essential Services Act of 1993, and the Panchayat Raj Regulation Amendment Act of 1992, while Apang's government also oversaw considerable infrastructural development across the state.

Tarung Pabin contested the 37-Pasighat West (ST) seat as the INC candidate and defeated his opponent Tatong Padung to secure the constituency.

== See also ==
- Arunachal Pradesh Legislative Assembly
- Pasighat West (Vidhan Sabha constituency)
- East Siang district
- Adi people
- Indian National Congress
- Gegong Apang
