= Tage Taki =

Indian politician

Tage Taki is an Indian politician from the state of Arunachal Pradesh.

Taki was elected from the Ziro-Hapoli Assembly Constituency in the 2014 Arunachal Pradesh Legislative Assembly election, standing as a BJP candidate. He is an engineer by qualification, having served as a Superintending Engineer in the Arunachal Pradesh Public Works Department. He is from Lempia village in Ziro valley of Arunachal Pradesh. He succeeded Padi Richo INC candidate, who was the previous MLA from Ziro-Hapoli region by defeating him by 1219 votes. Tage Taki was elected for a second consecutive term in 2019 Arunachal Pradesh Legislative Assembly election by defeating his rival INC candidate Sri Nani Ribya by a margin of 1774 votes. Tage Taki is inducted as a cabinet minister in the Pema Khandu government as Minister of Agriculture, Horticulture, Animal Husbandry, and Veterinary & Dairy Development and Fisheries.

== See also ==
Arunachal Pradesh Legislative Assembly
