= Bamang Felix =

Indian politician

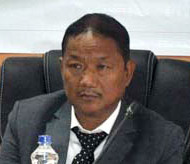
- Citizenship: India
- Political party: Bharatiya Janata Party

Bamang Felix is an Indian politician from the state of Arunachal Pradesh. Felix was elected unopposed from the Nyapin seat in the 2014 Arunachal Pradesh Legislative Assembly election, standing as a National Congress Party candidate.

Bamang Felix also served as home minister and as Arunachal Pradesh parliamentary secretary for education.

Bamang Felix served as the Congress Legislature Party's spokesperson.

== See also ==
- Arunachal Pradesh Legislative Assembly
