= Robin Hibu =

1993 batch IPS Officer

Special Commissioner of Police and Director general of police, New Delhi Robin Hibu IPS
- Born: 1 July 1968 (age 58); North-East Frontier Agency
- Education: Master's degree in Sociology
- Alma mater: Jawaharlal Nehru University
- Police career
- Service years: 1993 - present
- Status: Active
- Rank: DGP, Managing Director at Delhi Housing Corporation
- Batch: 47RR
- Cadre: AGMUT
- Awards: UN Peace Medal for Meritorious Services in Bosnia, President's Police Medal for Gallantry; President's Police Medal for Distinguished Services in 2010 and 2017; Best IPS Officer Award

Robin Hibu (born 1 July 1968) is a serving IPS officer of 1993 (47RR) batch of AGMUT cadre. Hibu is currently posted as Special Commissioner of Police at Delhi Armed Police. Hibu was also the CSO (chief security officer) at Rastrapati Bhavan. Hibu also holds the position as managing director at Delhi Police Housing Corporation.

== Early life and education ==
Hibu was born and brought up in a small village named 'Hong' in Ziro Valley of Arunachal Pradesh. Hibu has a master's degree in sociology from the Jawaharlal Nehru University.

== Police career ==
Hibu joined as an IPS officer in 1993. He is the first IPS officer from Arunachal Pradesh.

Hibu also served as the Joint commnissioner of Police, New Delhi. Hibu, in his posting at New Delhi, always raised his concern about women's safety and against racism towards North-East Indian people residing in Delhi. Hibu, even left his personal mobile on social media platforms so that North-eastern people can contact him immediately whenever they are in problems.

Hibu, during the COVID-19 pandemic, encouraged citizens to work without any fear as he was also helping the victims.

As reported by Navbharat Times, Hibu doesn't own any house, car, or two-wheeler despite being an IPS officer and donates 60% of his own salary to his charity Helping Hands.

In June, 2024, Hibu was promoted to the DGP rank by the Union Home Ministry of India.

=== Interviews and commentaries ===
In an interview with The Hindu, Robin Hibu raised concern about females' safety in the current era.

== Social activities ==
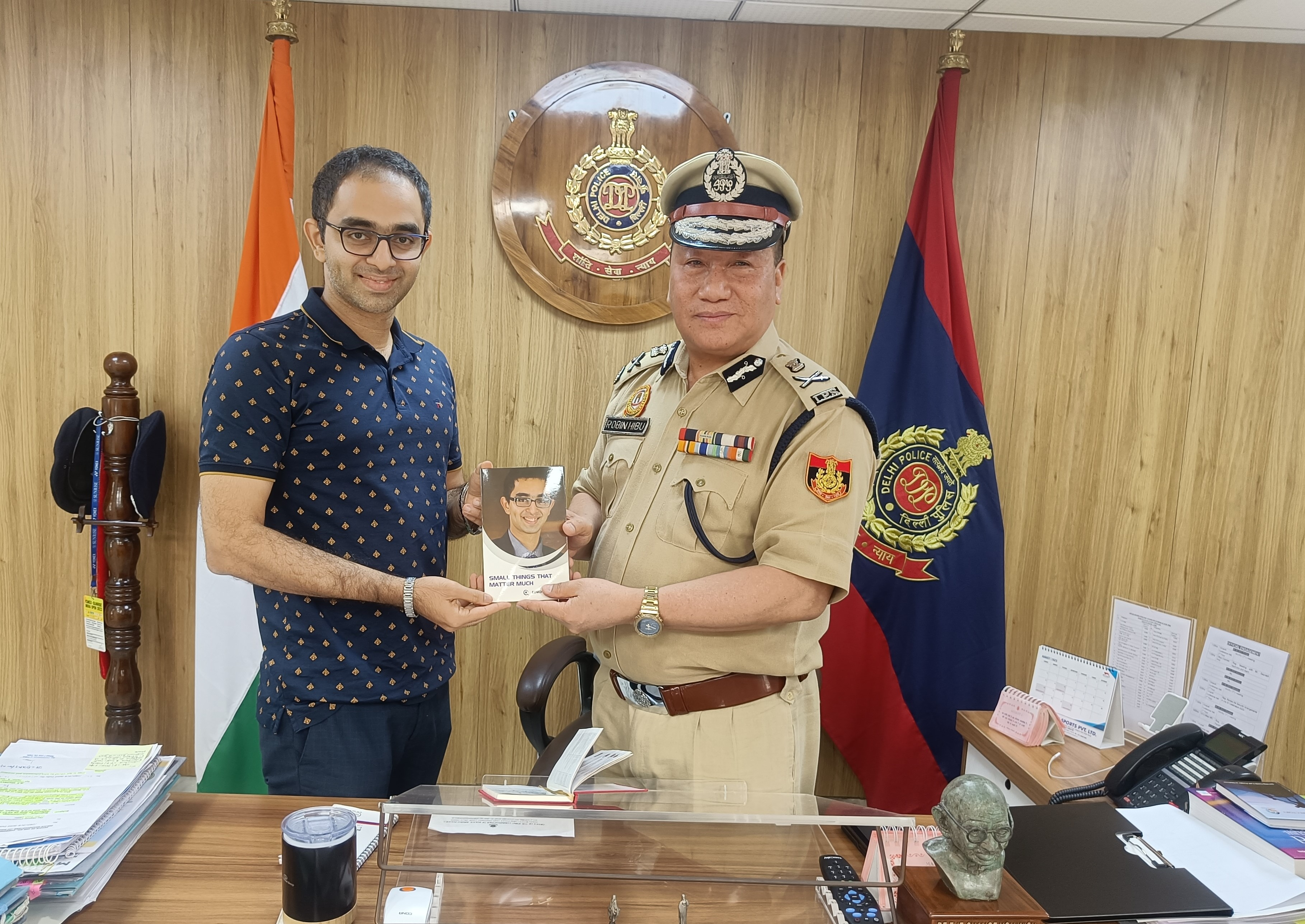
Robin Hibu with Dr Edmond Fernandes at Delhi Police HQ

Hibu runs an NGO 'Helping Hands' to serve the North-east Indian citizens in distress. The NGO also provided oxygen in Delhi during the COVID-19. Noted Indian boxer and Rajya Sabha MP Mary Kom also supported Hibu's NGO Helping Hands and provided financial support to Northeastern COVID-19 patients in Delhi.

== Awards ==
- UN Peace Medal for Meritorious Services in Bosnia – 1998
- Samajik Ratna Puraskar – 2007
- President's Police Medal for Distinguished Services in 2010 and 2017.
- Global Mahatma Gandhi Award, 2019.
- Ati Utkrisht Seva Padak.
- Best IPS Officer Award (Newspapers Association of India ).
- Antrik Suraksha Seva Padak

== Biography on Robin ==
- Hibu's Biography by Khamrang, Thanmi (2021). Cop With A Golden Heart Robin Hibu. Walnut Publication. ISBN 9789355741004.
- IGP Robin Hibu gets honoured with President of India Distinguish Service Medal again
- Dos & don'ts in Delhi irk N-E students
