= Kurung Kumey district =

Coordinates: 27°54′N 93°21′E

- District of Arunachal Pradesh
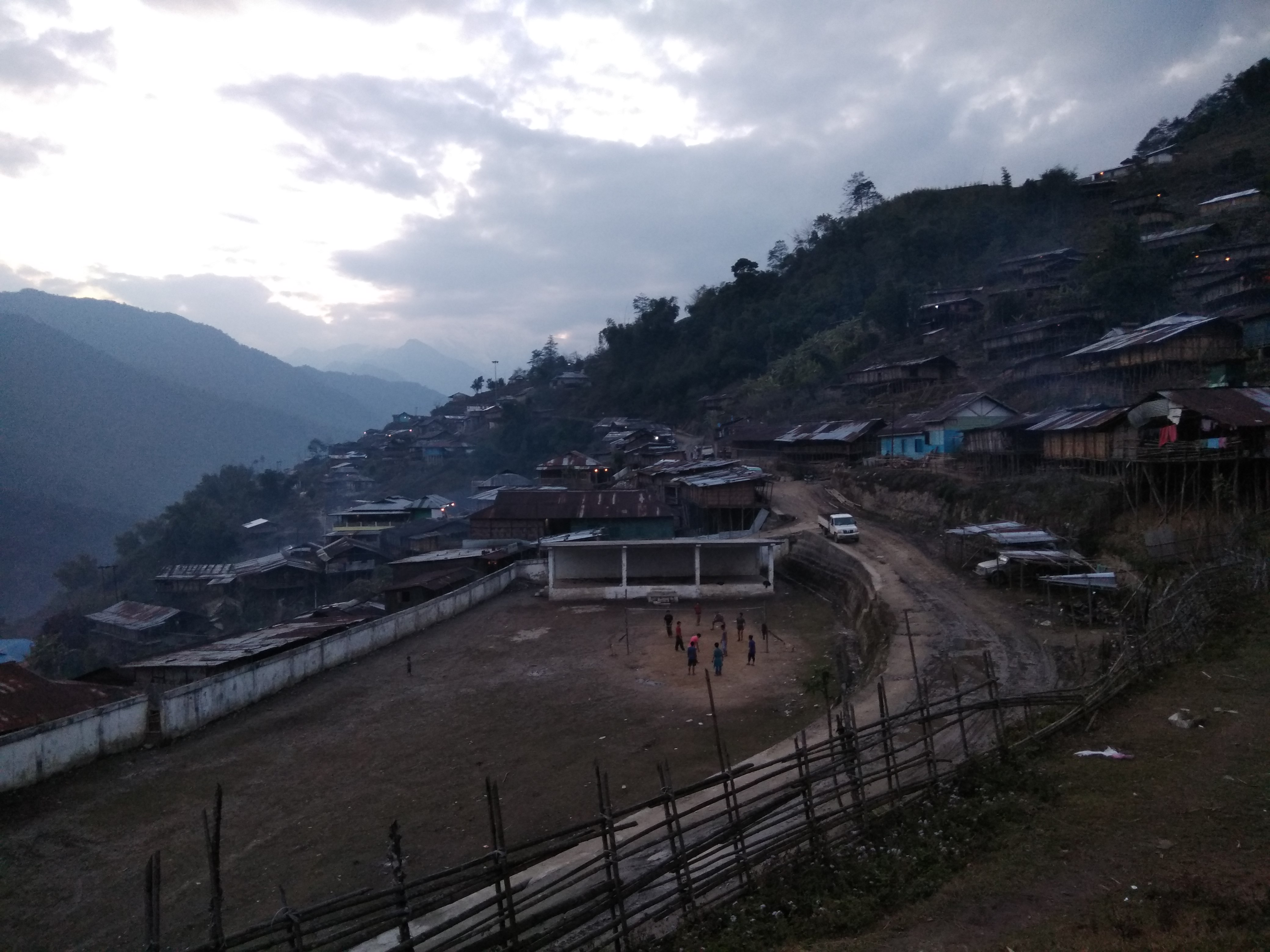
- Sarli valley

- Location in Arunachal Pradesh
- Country: India
- State: Arunachal Pradesh
- Headquarters: Koloriang

Area
  - Total: 3,838 km^{2} (1,482 sq mi)

Population (2011)
  - Total: 45,372
  - Density: 11.82/km^{2} (30.62/sq mi)

Demographics
  - Literacy: 50.7%
  - Sex ratio: 1029
- Time zone: UTC+05:30 (IST)
- Website: kurungkumey.nic.in

Kurung Kumey district (Pron:/kʊˈɹʌŋ kʊˈmi/) is one of the 26 districts of the northeastern Indian state of Arunachal Pradesh, with its district headquarters in Koloriang.

== Origin of name ==
The name of this district is derived from the Kurung and the Kumey, the two principal rivers which flow through it. According to the myth the Kurung and the Kumey rivers were two sisters; during the age of marriage Kurung eloped without permission from her parents and Kumey got married according to her parents' wishes. Therefore, the Kurung flows with a violent roar and ashy colour because her parents shout and throw ashes after her, while the Kumey flows silently and clearly with pleasure from her parents. So people Accepted River was more beautiful than the Kurung River and followed the discipline of their parents.

== History ==
The territory occupied by the present district became part of the North East Frontier Tracts in 1914. In 1954, it became part of Subansiri Frontier Division, which was later renamed as Lower Subansiri district. On 1 April 2001, this district was created by bifurcating Lower Subansiri district.

== Divisions ==
The following are the sub-divisions and circles of Kurung Kumey district:

- Nyapin Sub-Division: Circles of Nyapin, Phassang
- Koloriang Sub-Division: Circles of Parsi-Parlo, Koloriang, Sangram
- Damin Sub-Division: Circles of Sarli, Damin

There are two Arunachal Pradesh Legislative Assembly constituencies in this district: Nyapin, and Koloriang. Both are part of Arunachal West Lok Sabha constituency.

== Demographics ==
According to the 2011 census Kurung Kumey district has a population of 92,076, roughly equal to the nation of Seychelles. This gives it a ranking of 617th in India (out of a total of 640). The district has a population density of 15 inhabitants per square kilometre (39/sq mi). Its population growth rate over the decade 2001–2011 was 111.01%. Kurung Kumey has a sex ratio of 1029 females for every 1000 males, and a literacy rate of 50.67%.

After bifurcation the district has a population of 45,372. Scheduled Tribes are 44,641 (98.39%).

Religions in Kurung Kumey district (2011)
Religion	Per cent
Donyi-Polo	47.21%
Christianity	47.02%
Hinduism	5.38%
Islam	0.50%
Other or not stated	1.65%

Languages of Kurung Kumey District (2011)
1. Nyishi (96.1%)
2. Rai (2.10%)
3. Others (1.84%)

At the time of the 2011 census, 93.62% of the population spoke Nyishi and 4.09% Puroik as their first language.

Hiya village under the Nyapin circle is the largest village in the Kurung Kumey district in terms of the total population and geographical extent. The village is mostly inhabited by Tame Clan (Now Tarh) besides clans like Takio, Tai, Hillang, Kipa, Bakey, etc. which compromise with a few populations. Tarh is a clan-based society mixed of several clans like Hura, Tam, Takio, Tame, Tayeng, Hina, Tarak, and many more some of them settled in Kra Daadi, Lower Subansiri, Papum Pare, East Kameng, etc.

The main tribes inhabiting the district are Nyishi, Bangru, and Puroik.

Bangru as a distinct cultural and linguistic group is hardly known by outsiders; who still consider them as part of the Nyishi tribe. But according to recent research, they are distinct from Nyishi in terms of their language and origin. They are considered to be more similar to the Miji (Sajolang) of the West Kameng district of Arunachal Pradesh in terms of their language and customs.
