= Lower Subansiri district =

Coordinates: 27°48′N 93°36′E

- District of Arunachal Pradesh
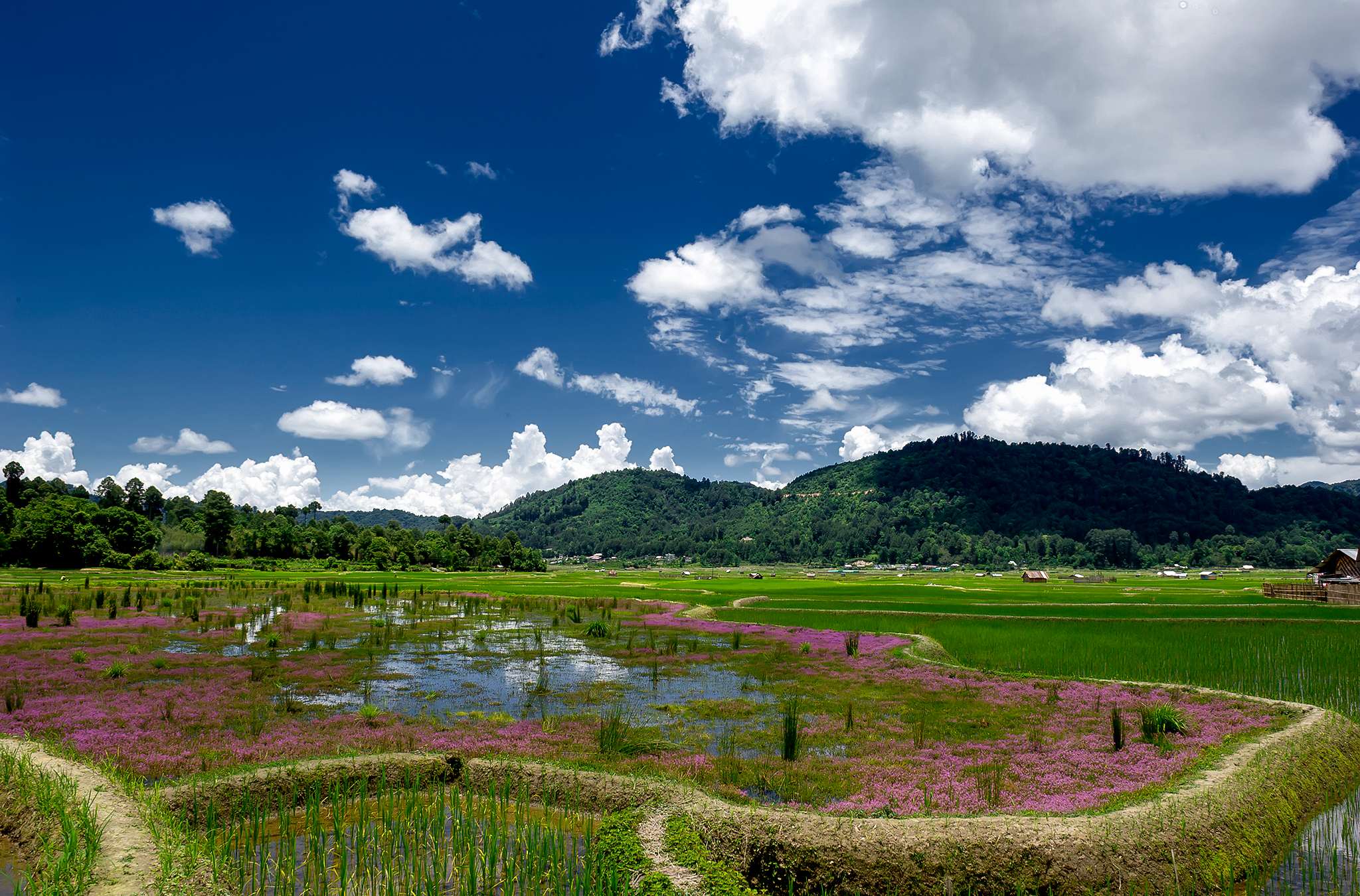
- Paddy fields near Ziro
- Interactive map of Lower Subansiri district
- Country: India
- State: Arunachal Pradesh
- Headquarters: Ziro

Population (2011)
  - Total: 83,030

Demographics
  - Literacy: 76.3%
  - Sex ratio: 975
- Time zone: UTC+05:30 (IST)
- Website: lowersubansiri.nic.in

Lower Subansiri district (/suːbənˈsɪri/) is one of the 25 administrative districts of the state of Arunachal Pradesh in northeastern India.

== History ==
The district was formed when Subansiri district was bifurcated into Upper and Lower Subansiri districts in 1987.

In 1999 Papum Pare district was split to form new district, and this was repeated on 1 April 2001, with the creation of Kurung Kumey district.

In October 2017, the state government approved the creation of Kamle district, involving the carving out of Raga, Dolungmukh and Kumpurijio circles from Lower Subansiri district.

In 2024, the Keyi Panyor district was formed by carving out 195 villages from Lower Subansiri district.

== Geography ==
The district headquarters are located at Ziro. The district occupies an area of 3,460 km^{2}.

It is bounded on the north by the Upper Subansiri district of Arunachal, on the south by Papum Pare District of Arunachal Pradesh and Assam, on the east by West Siang district and some part of Upper Subansiri, and on the west by East Kameng district of Arunachal Pradesh.

== Divisions ==
There are 6 administrative circles in this district, namely, Ziro (Sadar), Yachuli, Pistana, Raga, Kamporijo and Dollungmukh. The district also divided into 3 blocks: Ziro-I, Ziro-II, and Tamen-Raga.

There are 2 Arunachal Pradesh Legislative Assembly constituencies located in this district: Yachuli and Ziro-Hapoli. Both of these are part of Arunachal West Lok Sabha constituency.

== Demographics ==
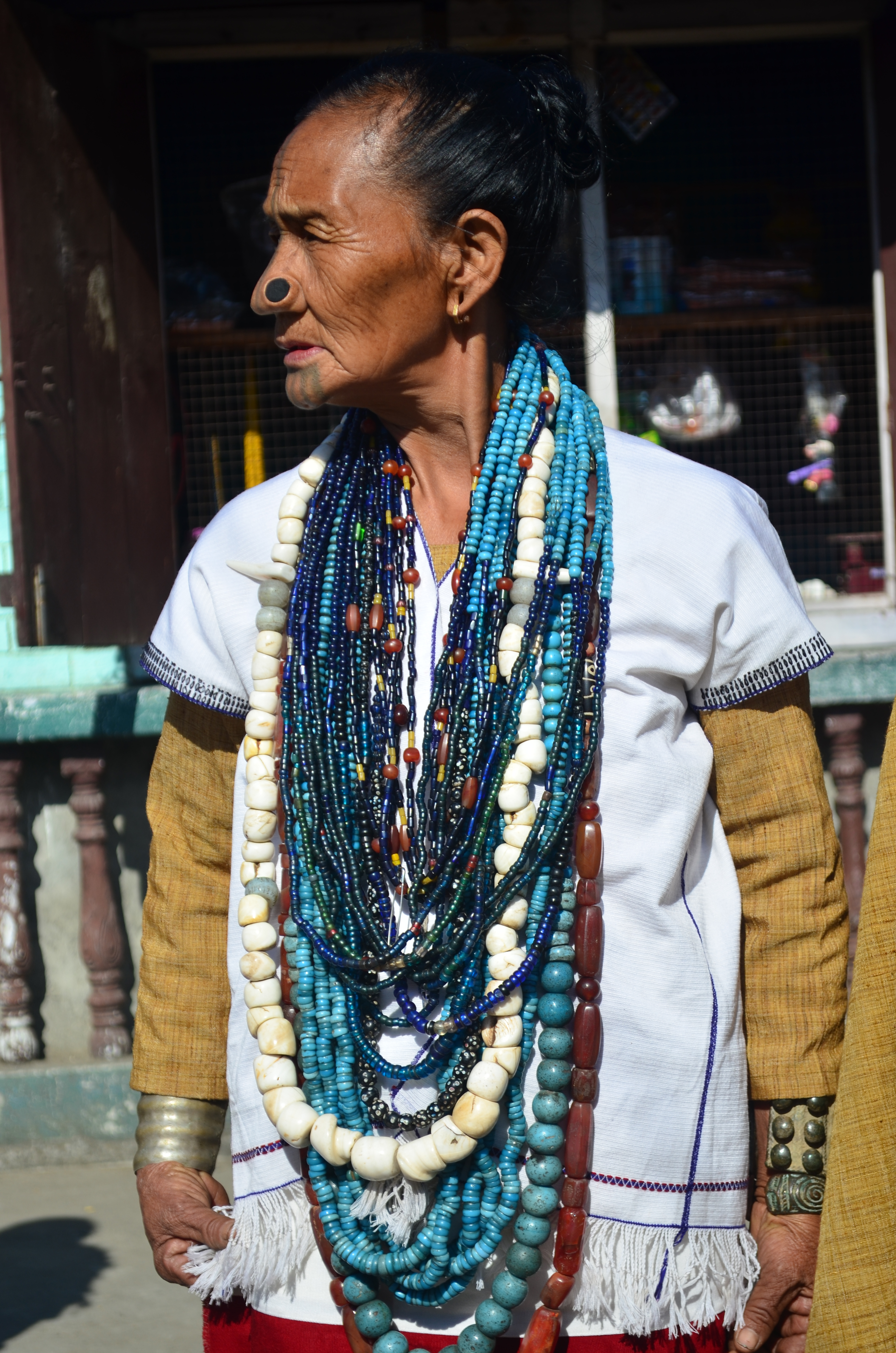
An Apatani woman in a traditional attire during Muting Festival.

Historical population
| Year | Pop. | ±% p.a. |
|---|---|---|
| 1961 | 23,950 | — |
| 1971 | 30,823 | +2.56% |
| 1981 | 35,405 | +1.40% |
| 1991 | 43,148 | +2.00% |
| 2001 | 55,726 | +2.59% |
| 2011 | 83,030 | +4.07% |

According to the 2011 census Lower Subansiri district has a population of 83,030, roughly equal to the nation of Andorra. This gives it a ranking of 623rd in India (out of a total of 640). The district has a population density of 24 inhabitants per square kilometre (62/sq mi) . Its population growth rate over the decade 2001–2011 was 48.65%. Lower Subansiri has a sex ratio of 975 females for every 1000 males, and a literacy rate of 76.33%.

This district is inhabited by Apatanis.

=== Languages ===
Languages of Lower Subansiri District (2011)
1. Apatani (86.9%)
2. Hindi (2.68%)
3. Nepali (2.42%)
4. Assamese (2.35%)
5. Nyishi (2.21%)
6. Others (3.40%)

Languages used in the district is mainly Apatani.

== Culture ==
Major local festivals of the district are Myoko and Dree Festival.

== Flora and fauna ==
In 1995 Lower Subansiri district became home to the Talley Valley Wildlife Sanctuary, which has an area of 337 km^{2} (130.1 mi^{2}).

== Development ==
Gyati Takka General Hospital (GTGH) in Lower Subansiri district has become the first hospital in the state of Arunachal Pradesh to receive support from CHD Group in its effort to build robust health system for the North East Region.
