= Ziro =

- Town
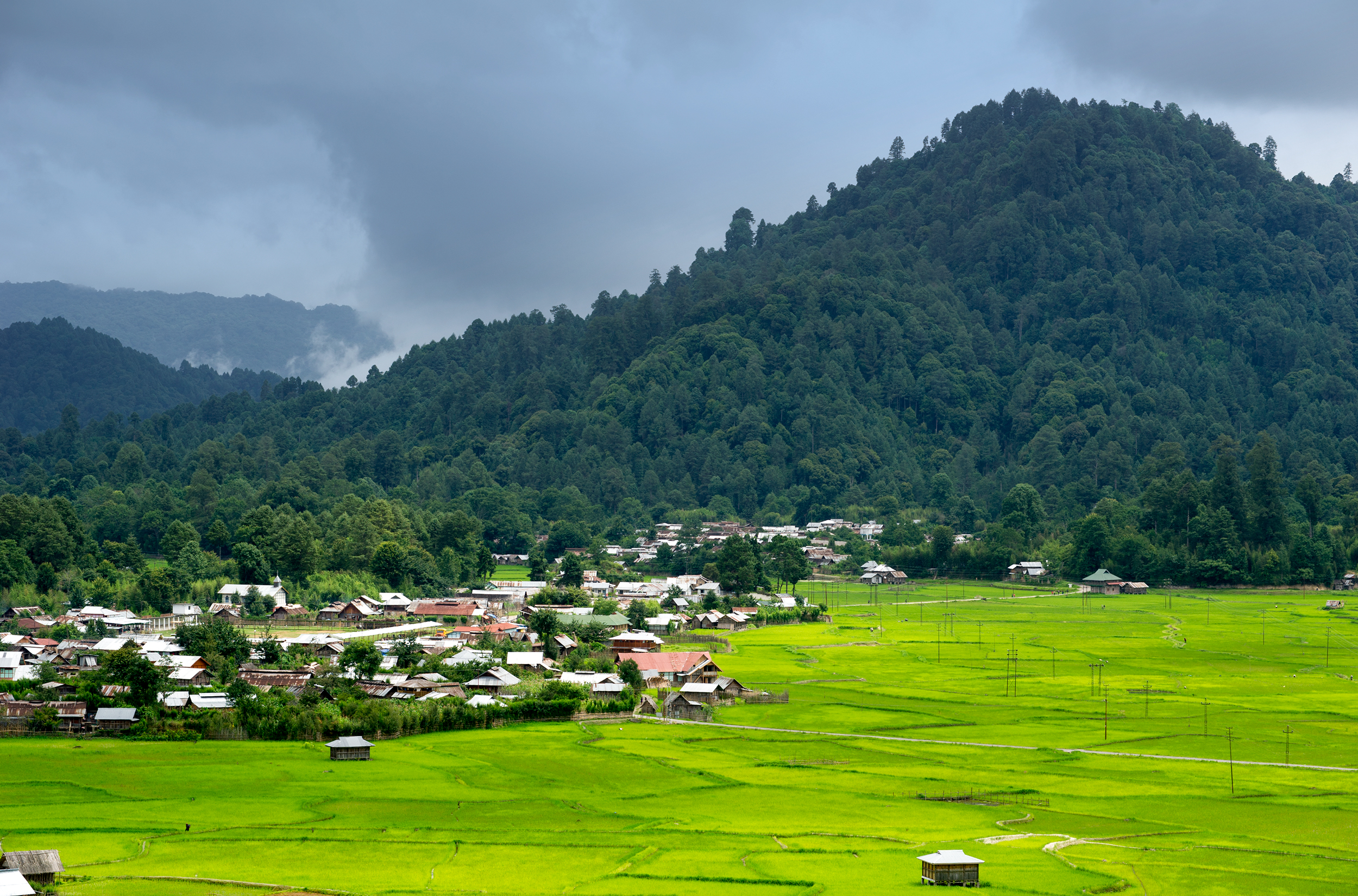
- A cross-section of the lush green valley of Ziro
- Interactive map of Ziro
- Coordinates: 27°32′30″N 93°48′58″E
- Country: India
- State: Arunachal Pradesh
- District: Lower Subansiri
- Elevation: 1,688 m (5,538 ft)

Population (2011)
  - Total: 12,806

Languages
  - Official: English
- Time zone: UTC+5:30 (IST)
- Postal code: 791120
- Vehicle registration: AR-06
- Climate: Cwa

Ziro is a town in and the district headquarters of the Lower Subansiri district of the Indian state of Arunachal Pradesh. The part of the town which is the centre of economic activities and where the administrative offices are located is called Hapoli, or locally known by the Apatanis as "Hao-Polyang". Ziro is home to the Apatani tribe. Ziro is included in the Tentative List for UNESCO's World Heritage Site for the Apatani cultural landscape.

Ziro is 115 km from the state capital, Itanagar, 112 km from North Lakhimpur in Assam and 96 km from Naharlagun railway station. Indian Air Force's ALG airstrip is at Ziro.

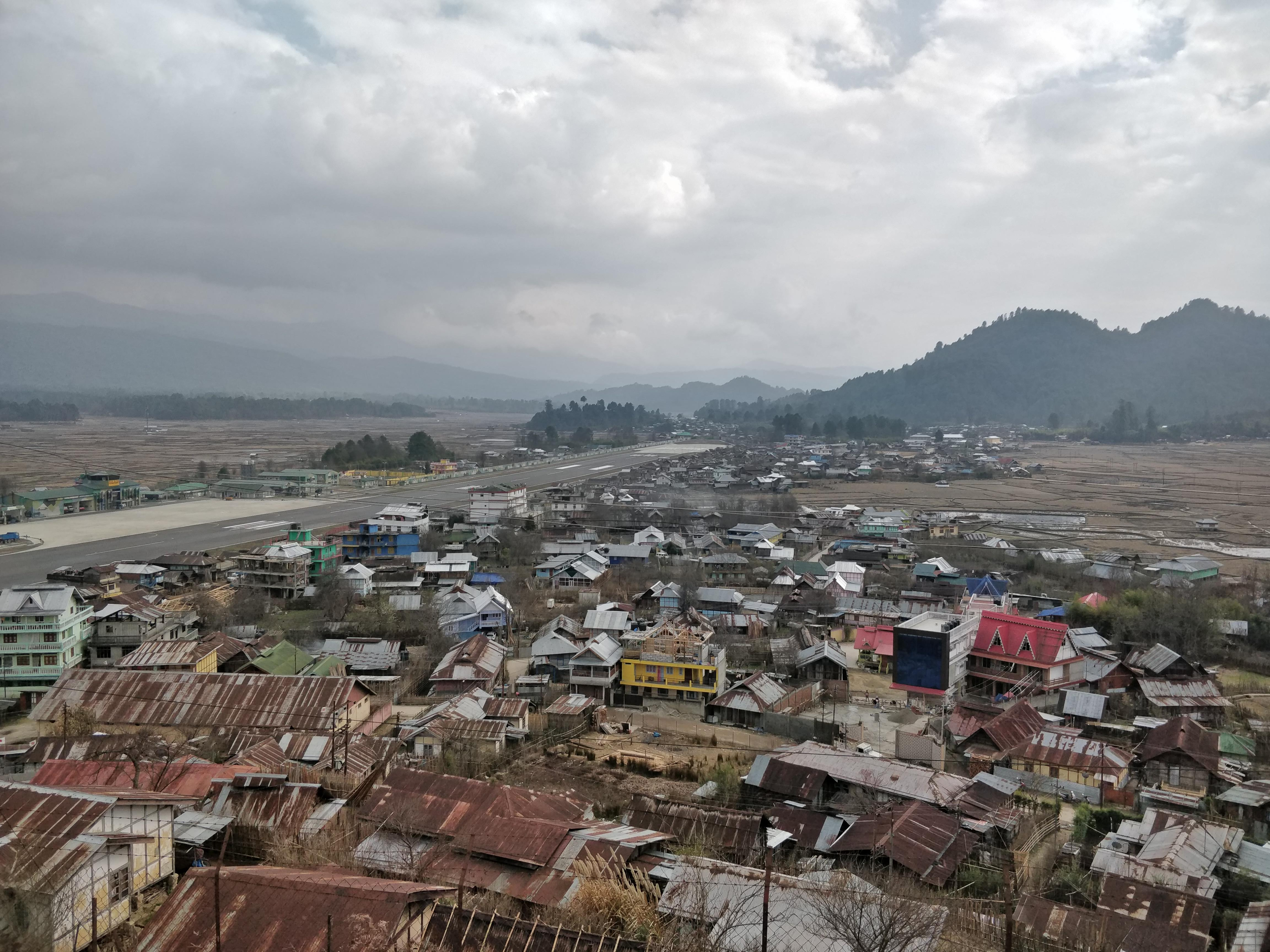
View of the Old Ziro settlement, with the runway of Ziro Airport visible on the left side

== Geography ==
Ziro is the district headquarter of Lower Subansiri district and one of the oldest towns in Arunachal Pradesh. It is located at an elevation of 1688 metres (5538 feet) to 2438 meters (8000 feet). Its cool weather in summer is its major attraction. It is famous for its surrounding pine-clad gentle hills and its rice fields.

== Transport ==
=== Road ===
Ziro is around 115 km from the state capital, Itanagar and takes approx. three and a half hours by road, via the improved Hoj-Potin road, along NH-229, and 150 km via the Assam route.

=== Rail ===
The nearest railway station from Ziro is located at Naharlagun, near the Arunachal-Assam border, which is around 100 km from Ziro.

=== Air ===
The nearest airport to Ziro is Ziro Airport, which is an Advanced Landing Ground (ALG) of the Indian Air Force, and along with it, flights are operated by Alliance Air. It is located in the main town of old Ziro. Other main and major airports lying in proximity to Ziro are North Lakhimpur in Assam (116 km) and Itanagar (133 km).

== Climate ==
The climatic condition of the district varies from place to place as well as season to season. Its climate is largely influenced by the nature of terrain depending upon altitude and location of the place. It could be broadly be divided into four seasons in a year:

1. The cold weather season is from December to February
2. March to May is the pre-monsoon season of thunderstorms
3. The southwest monsoon from June to about the middle of October
4. The second half of October to November, which constitutes the post-monsoon or the retreating monsoon period and is a period of transition

In the foothills or low high belt area of the district, the climatic condition is moderate in comparison to high belt areas, where during winter it is very cold and chilly, and in summer is pleasant. December and January are generally the coldest months, and July and August are warmest months.

Annual rainfall in the south is heavier than that in the northern areas of the district. During the monsoon period, more than 70 percent of the rain over the southern half occurs while in the northern portions it is about 60 percent. Variability of rainfall for the monsoon and the year, as a whole, are relatively small. Average annual rainfall of the district headquarters, Ziro recorded as 934.88 cm during 2000.

The relative humidity is always high throughout the year except in the winter months being slightly less humid. In the cold season, the sky is obscured on many mornings due to lifted fog which clears with the advance of the day generally, moderately clouded in the period of March to May, heavily clouded to overcast in the monsoon season and clear or slightly clouded during the post-monsoon season. Winds are generally light strong katabatic winds down the valleys are experienced as the local effect produced by the nature of the terrain.

Climate data for Ziro
Month	Jan	Feb	Mar	Apr	May	Jun	Jul	Aug	Sep	Oct	Nov	Dec	Year
Record high °C (°F)	21.5 (70.7)	19.7 (67.5)	26.2 (79.2)	28.3 (82.9)	30.3 (86.5)	33.4 (92.1)	31.9 (89.4)	32.3 (90.1)	32.3 (90.1)	30.2 (86.4)	28.9 (84.0)	25.2 (77.4)	33.4 (92.1)
Mean daily maximum °C (°F)	12.9 (55.2)	13.2 (55.8)	16.8 (62.2)	19.1 (66.4)	21.0 (69.8)	23.3 (73.9)	25.0 (77.0)	25.1 (77.2)	24.0 (75.2)	23.4 (74.1)	18.3 (64.9)	15.8 (60.4)	19.8 (67.6)
Mean daily minimum °C (°F)	−0.2 (31.6)	2.3 (36.1)	4.7 (40.5)	8.3 (46.9)	12.4 (54.3)	14.7 (58.5)	15.8 (60.4)	15.1 (59.2)	13.7 (56.7)	10.1 (50.2)	4.4 (39.9)	0.4 (32.7)	8.5 (47.3)
Record low °C (°F)	−6.7 (19.9)	−3.0 (26.6)	−0.4 (31.3)	1.4 (34.5)	3.4 (38.1)	7.6 (45.7)	9.2 (48.6)	10.2 (50.4)	9.0 (48.2)	2.0 (35.6)	−4.2 (24.4)	−5.7 (21.7)	−6.7 (19.9)
Average rainfall mm (inches)	88.7 (3.49)	106.1 (4.18)	78.6 (3.09)	169.0 (6.65)	199.5 (7.85)	292.5 (11.52)	249.0 (9.80)	232.4 (9.15)	199.9 (7.87)	64.1 (2.52)	51.2 (2.02)	13.6 (0.54)	1,744.3 (68.67)
Average rainy days (≥ 2.5 mm)	5.2	7.3	6.8	10.8	13.1	15.7	14.5	14.6	12.8	4.8	3.4	1.5	110.5
Average relative humidity (%) (at 17:30 IST)	75	76	78	79	75	77	76	77	77	81	79	75	77
Source: India Meteorological Department

== Demography ==
As of 2011 India census, Ziro had a population of 12,806. Males constitute 50% of the population and females 50%. In Ziro, 17% of the population is under 6 years of age.

=== Languages ===
Languages spoken in Ziro (2011)
1. Apatani 63 (59.5%)
2. Bengali 8.62 (8.15%)
3. Assamese 5.87 (5.55%)
4. Nepali 5.82 (5.50%)
5. Bhojpuri 5.68 (5.37%)
6. Hindi 3.08 (2.91%)
7. Others 13.75 (13.0%)

According to the 2011 census, Apatani was the most spoken language in Ziro with 10,867 speakers followed by Bengali at 1,104, Assamese at 752, Nepali at 746, Bhojpuri at 728 and Hindi at 395.

== Culture ==
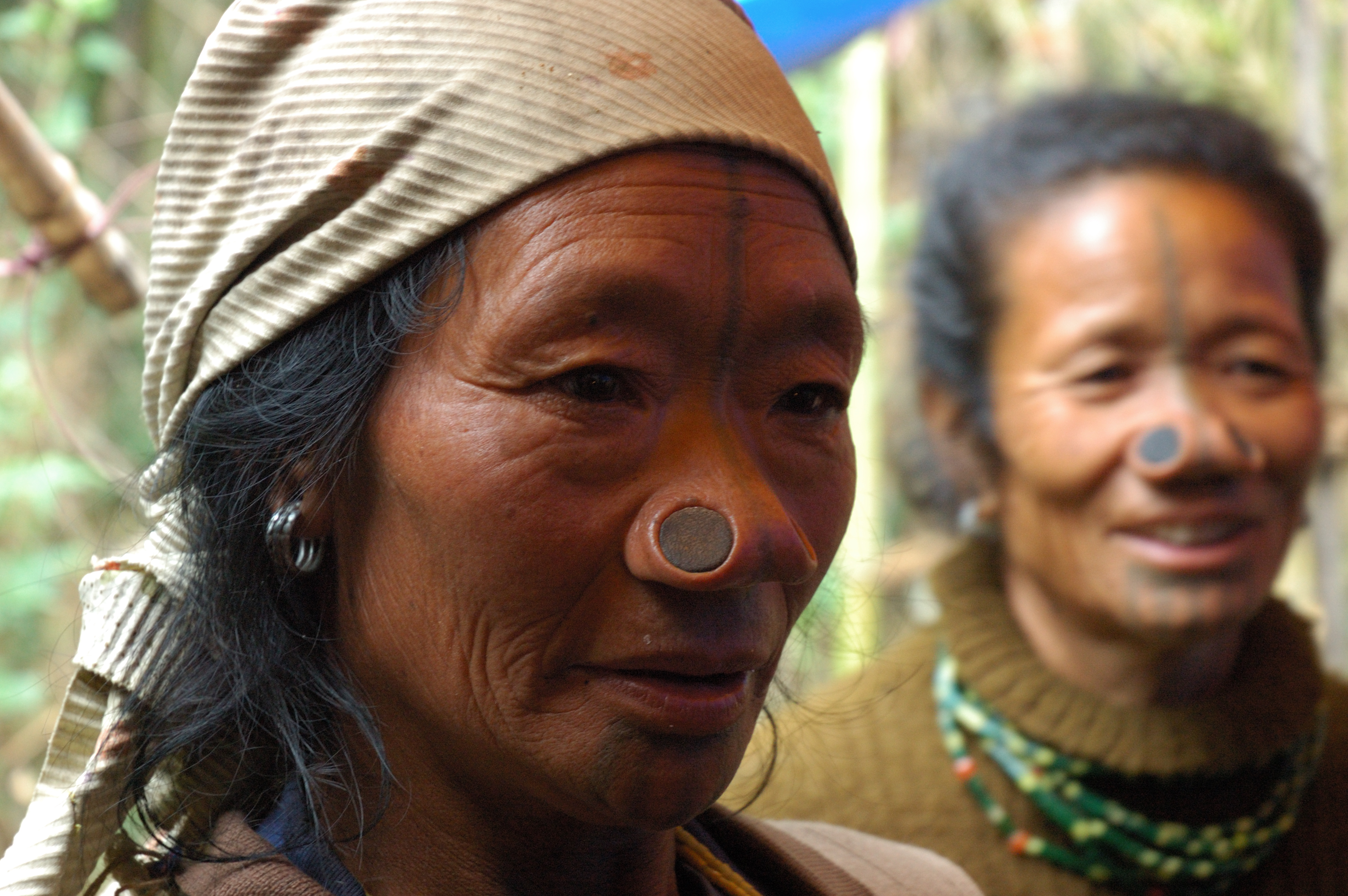
Apatani tribal women in Hija Village, Ziro.

=== Apatani culture ===
The Apatanis have a few unique characteristic features which differ from other tribes in Arunachal Pradesh and India. Unique characteristic features are:

(A) Apatanis practice permanent wet paddy cultivation whereas other tribes practice shifting cultivation called Jhom cultivation. (B) Apatanis cultivate permanent wet land cultivations whereas other tribes practice dry land cultivations by clearing the forests by burning the jungles. (C) Apatanis once practiced the art of facial tattoos.

=== UNESCO world heritage cultural sites ===
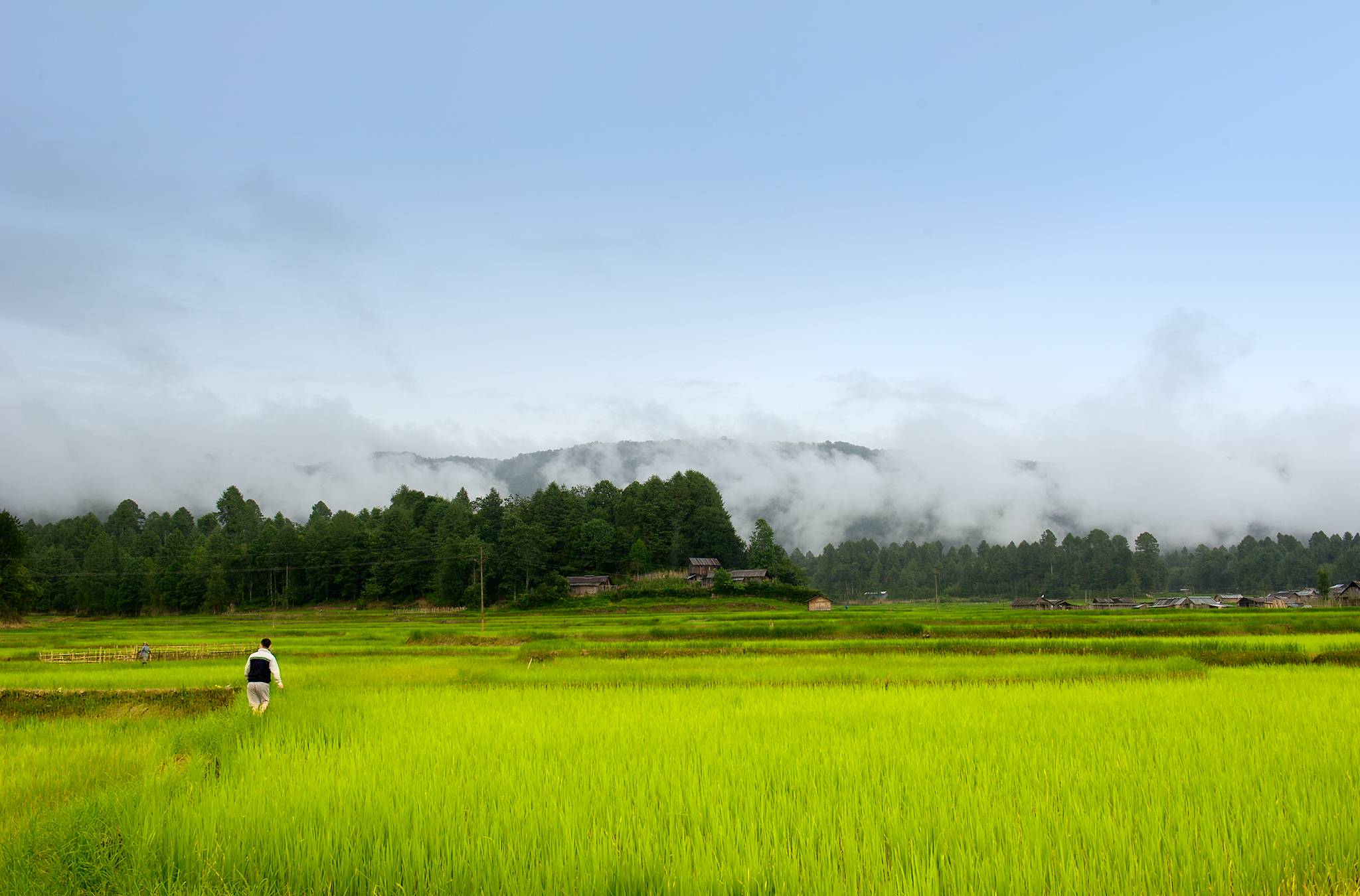
Ziro is known for a four-season tourist place and gives a pleasant feel in every season with variant colors in different seasons.

Apatani cultural landscape in Ziro Valley in Lower Subansiri district and Thembang Dzong in West Kameng district have been included in the Tentative List for UNESCO's World Heritage Site. The Arunachal Pradesh government has undertaken conservation works at these sites with the aim of ensuring inclusion of these sites in UNESCO's final list. Apatani cultural landscape comprises 32 sq km2 cultivable areas out of 1058 km^{2} plateau. Apatani tribe, which has inhabited this region for centuries, is known for practicing ecologically sustainable existential sustenance. Thembang Dzong is a 3.2 acres fortified village of Monpa tribe.

== Education ==
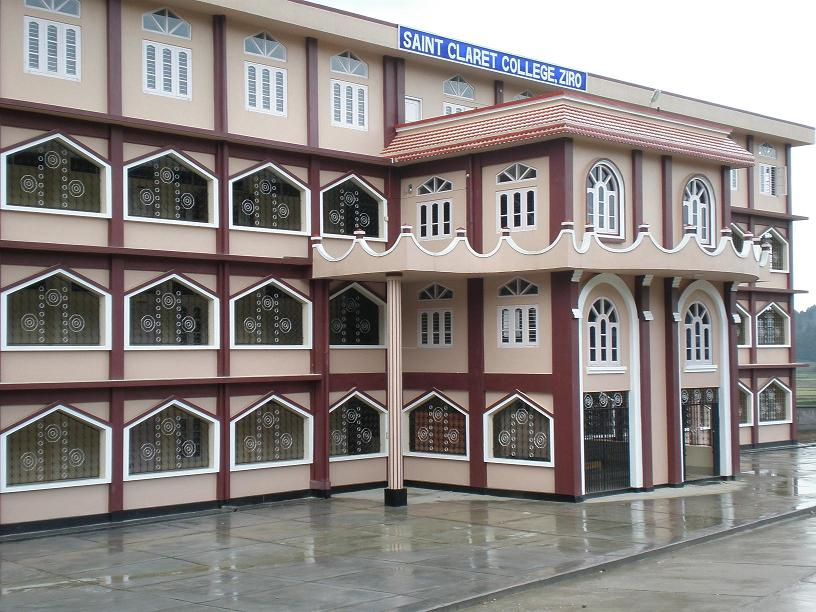
St Claret College, Ziro

Ziro has one university and one undergraduate arts college namely Indira Gandhi Technological and Medical Sciences University and Saint Claret College respectively. As of the 2001 census, Ziro had an average literacy rate of 66%, lower than the national average of 74.04%: male literacy was 72%, and female literacy was 60%. The older generation hadn't been exposed to formal education, but with the rapid pace of education of younger generations, the education scenario of Ziro grew tremendously and is poised to grow further.

Urban populace of Lower Subansiri district mainly reside in Ziro and as per 2011 census, average urban literacy rate in Lower Subansiri district is 85.52% of which males and females are 89.81% and 81.26% literates respectively. As per the 2011 census, 84.58% population of Lower Subansiri districts lives in rural areas of villages. The literacy rate in rural areas of Lower Subansiri district is 72.27%. Still, the combined literacy rate is 74.35%, which is second in Arunachal Pradesh, next only to Papumpare District where the capital city of Itanagar is located.

== Notable people ==
- Robin Hibu, Special Commissioner of the Delhi Police

== See also ==
- New Palin, a town in the Kurung Kumey district
