= Apatani people =

Ethnic group living in Northeast India

Apatani
Tani/Tanii, Apatani, Apa Tani
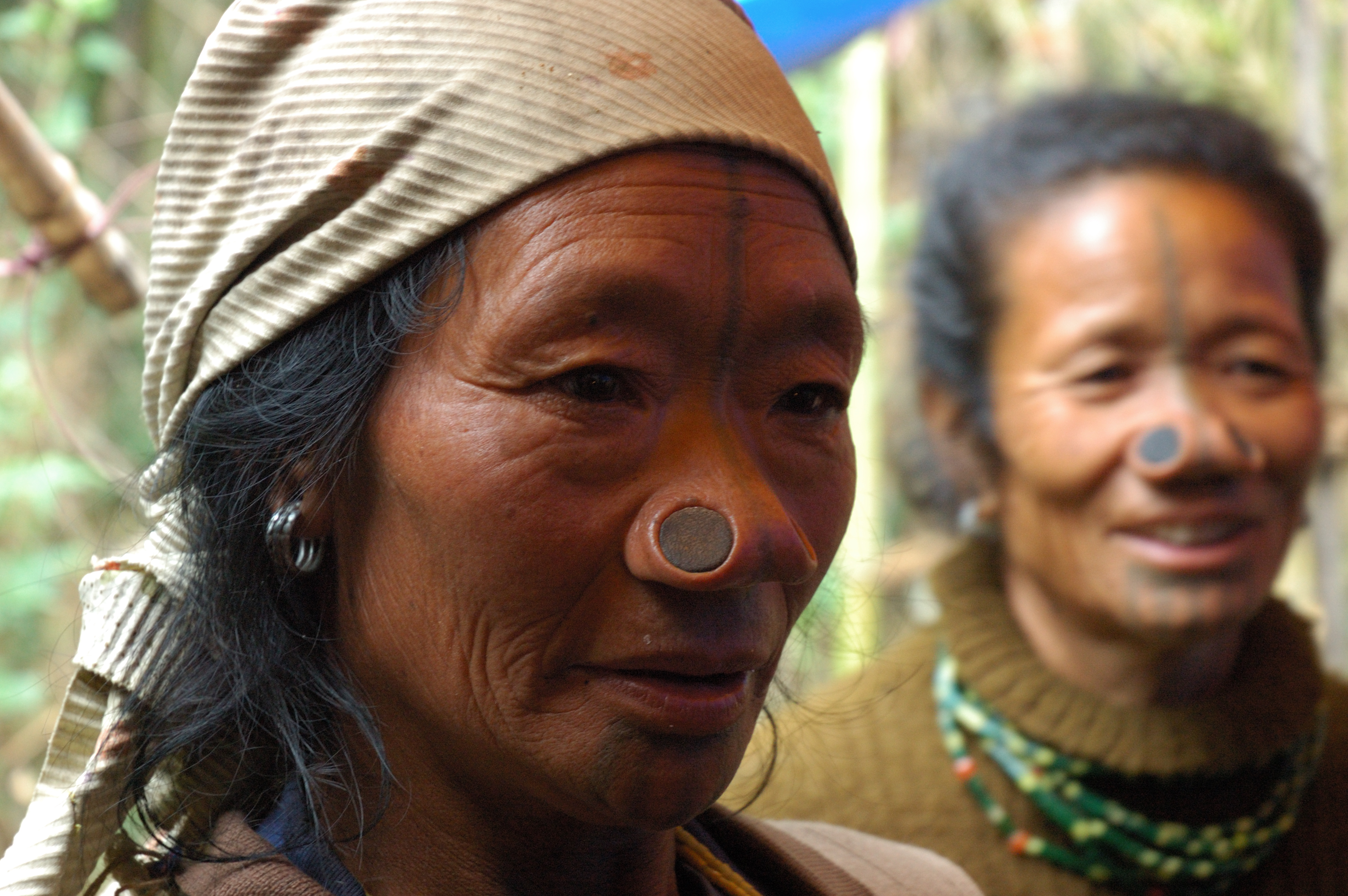
- Apatani women during a wedding

Total population
- 43,777 (2011 census)

Regions with significant populations
- India (Arunachal Pradesh)

Languages
- Tani

Religion
- Donyi-Polo • Christianity

Related ethnic groups
- Tani peoples

The Apatani people are an ethnic group who live in the Ziro valley of Arunachal Pradesh's Lower Subansiri region in India.

== Customs and lifestyle ==
Their wet rice cultivation system and their agriculture system are extensive even without the use of any farm animals or machines. So is their sustainable social forestry system. UNESCO has proposed the Apatani valley for inclusion as a World Heritage Site for its "extremely high productivity" and "unique" way of preserving the ecology.

The Apatanis, one of the major ethnic groups of eastern Himalayas, have a distinct civilization with systematic land-use practices and rich traditional ecological knowledge of natural resources management and conservation, acquired over the centuries through informal experimentation. The tribe is known for their colorful culture with various festivals, intricate handloom designs, skills in cane and bamboo crafts, and vibrant traditional village councils called bulyañ. This has made the Ziro Valley a good example of a living cultural landscape where humans and the environment have harmoniously existed together in a state of interdependence, even through changing times, such co-existence being nurtured by the traditional customs and spiritual belief systems.

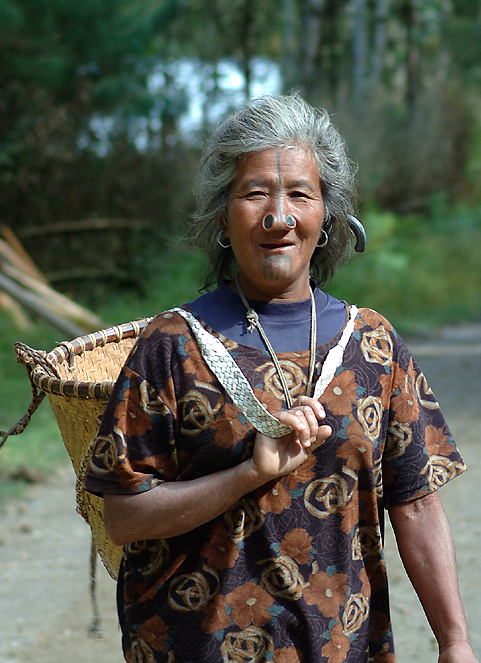
An Apatani woman with a basket going to the field.

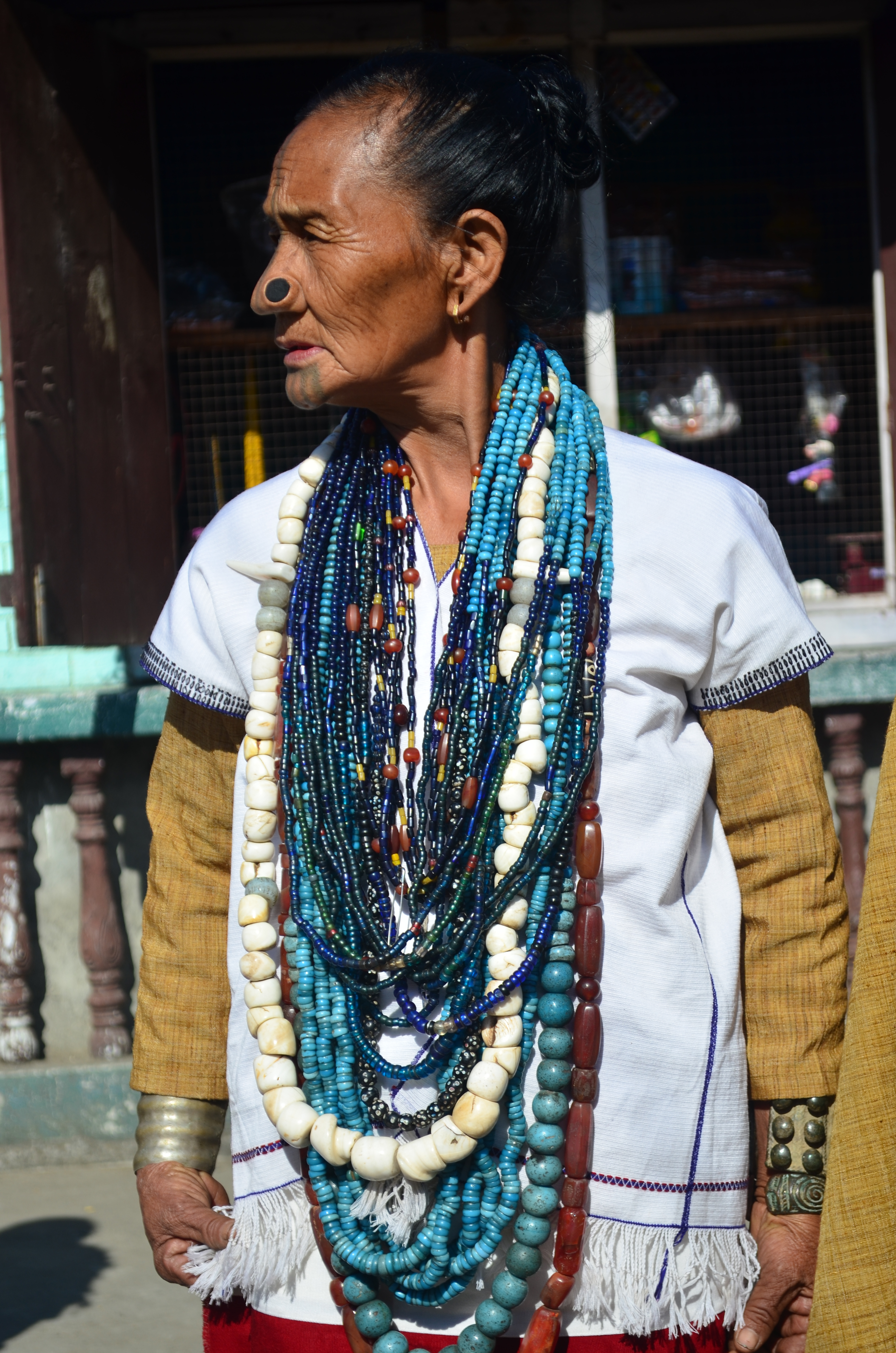
An Apatani woman in traditional attire during Murung festival.

== Festivals ==
They have two major festivals – Dree and Myoko. In July, the agricultural festival of Dree is celebrated with prayers for a bumper harvest and prosperity of all humankind. Paku-Itu, Daminda, Piree dance, etc., are the main cultural programmes performed in the festival. Myoko is celebrated to commemorate the intervillage friendship that has been passed down by the forefathers for generations until the present. This special bond is carried forward in the succeeding generation by the current members. The main celebration occurs in mid-March, but the rituals associated with the festival start much earlier in the preceding month and end in the next month of April. During this period, a huge amount of food and drinks is served and distributed by the host village.
