= 2013 elections in India =

Elections in India
- 2013

Legislative Assembly elections in India were conducted for nine legislative assemblies in 2013. Voting in Chhattisgarh was held in two phases on 11 November and 19 November 2013. The Election Commission of India (ECI) successfully conducted elections in Tripura, Meghalaya and Nagaland in February and in Karnataka on 5 May. The elections in Chhattisgarh, Delhi, Madhya Pradesh and Rajasthan were conducted in December while the counting that took place on 8 December showed a clear majority for BJP in the states of Madhya Pradesh, Rajasthan and Chhattisgarh, while Congress retained the state of Mizoram and Delhi got a hung assembly, with no single party getting a clear majority.

== Legislative Assembly ==
Polling Date(s)	State	Government before	Chief Minister before	Government after	Elected Chief Minister	Maps
14 February 2013	Tripura	Communist Party of India	Manik Sarkar	Communist Party of India	Manik Sarkar	
23 February 2013	Meghalaya	Indian National Congress	Mukul Sangma	Indian National Congress	Mukul Sangma	
23 February 2013	Nagaland	Naga People's Front	Neiphiu Rio	Naga People's Front	Neiphiu Rio	
5 May 2013	Karnataka	Bharatiya Janata Party	Jagadish Shettar	Indian National Congress	Siddaramaiah	
11 and 19 November 2013	Chhattisgarh	Bharatiya Janata Party	Raman Singh	Bharatiya Janata Party	Raman Singh	
25 November 2013	Madhya Pradesh	Bharatiya Janata Party	Shivraj Singh Chouhan	Bharatiya Janata Party	Shivraj Singh Chouhan	
1 December 2013	Rajasthan	Indian National Congress	Ashok Gehlot	Bharatiya Janata Party	Vasundhara Raje	
4 December 2013	Delhi	Indian National Congress	Sheila Dikshit	Aam Aadmi Party	Arvind Kejriwal	
4 December 2013	Delhi	Indian National Congress	Sheila Dikshit	Indian National Congress	Arvind Kejriwal	
9 December 2013	Mizoram	Indian National Congress	Lal Thanhawla	Indian National Congress	Lal Thanhawla	

== Parliamentary By-election ==
S.No	Date	Constituency	State	MP before election	Party before election	Elected MP	Party after election
19	2 June 2013	Maharajganj	Bihar	Uma Shankar Singh	Rashtriya Janata Dal	Prabhunath Singh	Rashtriya Janata Dal
2	2 June 2013	Banaskantha	Gujarat	Mukesh Gadhvi	Indian National Congress	Haribhai Parthibhai Chaudhary	Bharatiya Janata Party
11	2 June 2013	Porbandar	Gujarat	Vitthal Radadiya	Indian National Congress	Vitthal Radadiya	Bharatiya Janata Party
25	2 June 2013	Howrah	West Bengal	Ambica Banerjee	All India Trinamool Congress	Prasun Banerjee	All India Trinamool Congress
2	23 June 2013	Mandi	Himachal Pradesh	Virbhadra Singh	Indian National Congress	Pratibha Singh	Indian National Congress
20	21 August 2013	Mandya	Karnataka	N. Chaluvaraya Swamy	Janata Dal (Secular)	Ramya	Indian National Congress
23	21 August 2013	Bangalore Rural	Karnataka	H. D. Kumaraswamy	Janata Dal (Secular)	D. K. Suresh	Indian National Congress

== Assembly By-elections ==
=== Andhra Pradesh ===
S.No	Date	Constituency	MLA before election	Party before election	Elected MLA	Party after election
76	21 August 2013	Avanigadda	Ambati Brahmanaiah	Telugu Desam Party	Ambati Srihari Prasad	Telugu Desam Party

=== Arunachal Pradesh ===
S.No	Date	Constituency	MLA before election	Party before election	Elected MLA	Party after election
42	31 October 2013	Dambuk	Jomin Tayeng	Indian National Congress	Gum Tayeng	Indian National Congress

=== Assam ===
S.No	Date	Constituency	MLA before election	Party before election	Elected MLA	Party after election
8	24 February 2013	Algapur	Sahidul Alam Chodhary	Asom Gana Parishad	Mandira Roy	Indian National Congress

=== Bihar ===
S.No	Date	Constituency	MLA before election	Party before election	Elected MLA	Party after election
131	24 February 2013	Kalyanpur	Ram Sewak Hazari	Janata Dal (United)	Manju Kumari	Janata Dal (United)

=== Gujarat ===
S.No	Date	Constituency	MLA before election	Party before election	Elected MLA	Party after election
61	2 June 2013	Limbdi	Somabhai Gandalal Koli Patel	Indian National Congress	Kiritsinh Rana	Bharatiya Janata Party
74	2 June 2013	Jetpur	Jayesh Radadiya	Indian National Congress	Jayesh Radadiya	Bharatiya Janata Party
75	2 June 2013	Jetpur	Vitthal Radadiya	Indian National Congress	Pravin Makadiya	Bharatiya Janata Party
125	2 June 2013	Morva Hadaf	Savitaben Khant	Indian National Congress	Nimisha Suthar	Bharatiya Janata Party
167	4 December 2013	Surat West	Kishor Vankawala	Bharatiya Janata Party	Purnesh Modi	Bharatiya Janata Party

=== Maharashtra ===
S.No	Date	Constituency	MLA before election	Party before election	Elected MLA	Party after election
271	24 February 2013	Chandgad	Babasaheb Kupekar	Nationalist Congress Party	Sandhyadevi Kupekar	Nationalist Congress Party
70	2 June 2013	Yavatmal	Nilesh Shivram Deshmukh Parvekar	Indian National Congress	Nandini Nilesh Deshmukh Parvekar	Indian National Congress

=== Mizoram ===
S.No	Date	Constituency	MLA before election	Party before election	Elected MLA	Party after election
8	23 February 2013	Chalfilh	Chawngtinthanga	Indian National Congress	Ngurdingliana	Indian National Congress

=== Nagaland ===
S.No	Date	Constituency	MLA before election	Party before election	Elected MLA	Party after election
73	4 September 2013	Noksen	C. M. Chang	Naga People's Front	C. M. Chang	Naga People's Front

=== Punjab ===
S.No	Date	Constituency	MLA before election	Party before election	Elected MLA	Party after election
73	23 February 2013	Moga	Joginder Pal Jain	Indian National Congress	Joginder Pal Jain	Shiromani Akali Dal

=== Tamil Nadu ===
S.No	Date	Constituency	MLA before election	Party before election	Elected MLA	Party after election
83	23 February 2013	Yercaud	C. Perumal	All India Anna Dravida Munnetra Kazhagam	P. Saroja	All India Anna Dravida Munnetra Kazhagam

=== Uttar Pradesh ===
S.No	Date	Constituency	MLA before election	Party before election	Elected MLA	Party after election
340	23 February 2013	Bhatpar Rani	Kameswar Upadhyay	Samajwadi Party	Ashutosh Upadhyay	Samajwadi Party
258	2 June 2013	Handia	Mahesh Narayan Singh	Samajwadi Party	Prashant Singh	Samajwadi Party

=== West Bengal ===
S.No	Date	Constituency	MLA before election	Party before election	Elected MLA	Party after election
51	23 February 2013	English Bazar	Krishnendu Narayan Choudhury	Indian National Congress	Krishnendu Narayan Choudhury	Trinamool Congress
70	23 February 2013	Rejinagar	Humayun Kabir	Indian National Congress	Rabiul Alam Chowdhury	Indian National Congress
293	23 February 2013	Nalhati	Abhijit Mukherjee	Indian National Congress	Dipak Chatterjee	All India Forward Bloc

== Local body elections ==
- 2013 Uttarakhand local body elections

== See also ==
- V. S. Sampath
