= Results of the 2004 Indian general election by constituency =

To constitute India's 14th Lok Sabha, general elections were held in April–May 2004. The results were announced on 13 May 2004. The main contenders were two alliance groups of the Incumbent National Democratic Alliance and the Opposition Congress+ led by Bharatiya Janata Party and Indian National Congress respectively.

This article describes the performance of various political parties. For the performance of individual candidates, please see, List of members of the 14th Lok Sabha.

Results of the 2004 Indian general election by parliamentary constituency.

== Results by constituency ==
State	Parliamentary Constituency			Winner			Runner-up			Margin
State	No.	Name	Type	Candidate	Party	Votes	Candidate	Party	Votes	Margin
Andaman and Nicobar Islands	1	Andaman & Nicobar Islands	GEN	Manoranjan Bhakta	Indian National Congress	85,794	Bishnu Pada Ray	Bharatiya Janata Party	55,294	30,500
Andhra Pradesh	1	Srikakulam	GEN	Kinjarapu Yerran Naidu	Telugu Desam Party	3,61,906	Killi Krupa Rani	Indian National Congress	3,30,027	31,879
Andhra Pradesh	2	Parvathipuram	(ST)	Kishore Chandra Deo	Indian National Congress	3,21,788	Veera Gouri Sankara Rao	Telugu Desam Party	3,14,370	7,418
Andhra Pradesh	3	Bobbili	GEN	Kondapalli Pydithalli Naidu	Telugu Desam Party	3,73,922	Jhansi Laxmi Botcha	Indian National Congress	3,42,574	31,348
Andhra Pradesh	4	Visakhapatnam	GEN	Nedurumalli Janardhana Reddy	Indian National Congress	5,24,122	M. V. V. S. Murthi	Telugu Desam Party	3,93,551	1,30,571
Andhra Pradesh	5	Bhadrachalam	(ST)	Midiyam Babu Rao	Communist Party of India (Marxist)	3,73,148	KPRK Phaneeswaramma	Telugu Desam Party	3,19,342	53,806
Andhra Pradesh	6	Anakapalli	GEN	Pappala Chalapathirao	Telugu Desam Party	3,85,406	Nanda Gopal Gandham	Indian National Congress	3,69,992	15,414
Andhra Pradesh	7	Kakinada	GEN	Mallipudi Mangapati Pallam Raju	Indian National Congress	4,10,982	Mudragada Padmanabham	Telugu Desam Party	3,53,730	57,252
Andhra Pradesh	8	Rajahmundry	GEN	Vundavalli Aruna Kumar	Indian National Congress	4,13,927	Kantipudi Sarvarayudu	Bharatiya Janata Party	2,65,107	1,48,820
Andhra Pradesh	9	Amalapuram	(SC)	G. V. Harsha Kumar	Indian National Congress	3,50,346	Dunna Janardhana Rao	Telugu Desam Party	3,08,861	41,485
Andhra Pradesh	10	Narasapur	GEN	Chegondi Venkata Harirama Jogaiah	Indian National Congress	4,02,761	U. V. Krishnam Raju	Bharatiya Janata Party	3,38,349	64,412
Andhra Pradesh	11	Eluru	GEN	Kavuri Samba Siva Rao	Indian National Congress	4,99,191	Bolla Bulli Ramaiah	Telugu Desam Party	3,75,900	1,23,291
Andhra Pradesh	12	Machilipatnam	GEN	Badiga Ramakrishna	Indian National Congress	3,87,127	Ambati Brahmanaiah	Telugu Desam Party	3,36,786	50,341
Andhra Pradesh	13	Vijayawada	GEN	Lagadapati Rajagopal	Indian National Congress	5,19,624	Chalasani Ashwini Dutt	Telugu Desam Party	4,05,037	1,14,587
Andhra Pradesh	14	Tenali	GEN	Vallabhaneni Balasouri	Indian National Congress	3,66,843	Ummareddy Venkateswarlu	Telugu Desam Party	2,88,287	78,556
Andhra Pradesh	15	Guntur	GEN	Rayapati Sambasiva Rao	Indian National Congress	4,66,221	Yemparala Venkateswara Rao	Telugu Desam Party	3,36,429	1,29,792
Andhra Pradesh	16	Bapatla	GEN	Daggubati Purandeswari	Indian National Congress	4,11,099	Daggubati Ramanaidu	Telugu Desam Party	3,17,017	94,082
Andhra Pradesh	17	Narasaraopet	GEN	Mekapati Rajamohan Reddy	Indian National Congress	4,81,310	Maddi Lakshmaiah	Telugu Desam Party	3,95,055	86,255
Andhra Pradesh	18	Ongole	GEN	Magunta Sreenivasulu Reddy	Indian National Congress	4,46,584	Bathula Vijaya Bharathi	Telugu Desam Party	3,40,563	1,06,021
Andhra Pradesh	19	Nellore	(SC)	Panabaka Lakshmi	Indian National Congress	4,50,129	Balakondaiah Karupotala	Bharatiya Janata Party	3,21,905	1,28,224
Andhra Pradesh	20	Tirupathi	(SC)	Chinta Mohan	Indian National Congress	5,10,961	Nandipaku Venkataswamy	Bharatiya Janata Party	3,11,633	1,99,328
Andhra Pradesh	21	Chittoor	GEN	D. K. Adikesavulu Naidu	Telugu Desam Party	4,54,128	Ravuri Venkata Swamy	Indian National Congress	3,91,990	62,138
Andhra Pradesh	22	Rajampet	GEN	Sai Prathap Annayyagari	Indian National Congress	3,69,797	Gunipati Ramaiah	Telugu Desam Party	2,91,712	78,085
Andhra Pradesh	23	Cuddapah	GEN	Y. S. Vivekananda Reddy	Indian National Congress	4,61,431	M. V. Mysura Reddy	Telugu Desam Party	3,29,757	1,31,674
Andhra Pradesh	24	Hindupur	GEN	G. Nizamuddin	Indian National Congress	4,19,744	B K Parthasarathi	Telugu Desam Party	4,17,904	1,840
Andhra Pradesh	25	Anantapur	GEN	Anantha Venkatarami Reddy	Indian National Congress	4,58,925	Kalava Srinivasulu	Telugu Desam Party	3,85,521	73,404
Andhra Pradesh	26	Kurnool	GEN	Kotla Jayasurya Prakasha Reddy	Indian National Congress	4,33,529	K. E. Krishnamurthy	Telugu Desam Party	3,32,431	1,01,098
Andhra Pradesh	27	Nandyal	GEN	S. P. Y. Reddy	Indian National Congress	4,58,526	Bhuma Shobha Nagi Reddy	Telugu Desam Party	3,46,847	1,11,679
Andhra Pradesh	28	Nagarkurnool	(SC)	Manda Jagannath	Telugu Desam Party	4,05,046	K.S.Ratnam	Independent	3,05,396	99,650
Andhra Pradesh	29	Mahabubnagar	GEN	Devarakonda Vittal Rao	Indian National Congress	4,28,764	Yelkoti Yella Reddy	Telugu Desam Party	3,80,857	47,907
Andhra Pradesh	30	Hyderabad	GEN	Asaduddin Owaisi	All India Majlis-e-Ittehadul Muslimeen	3,78,854	G Subash Chanderji	Bharatiya Janata Party	2,78,709	1,00,145
Andhra Pradesh	31	Secunderabad	GEN	Anjan Kumar Yadav	Indian National Congress	4,85,710	Bandaru Dattatreya	Bharatiya Janata Party	4,16,952	68,758
Andhra Pradesh	32	Siddipet	(SC)	Sarvey Satyanarayana	Indian National Congress	5,93,879	K Lingaiah	Telugu Desam Party	4,54,907	1,38,972
Andhra Pradesh	33	Medak	GEN	A. Narendra	Telangana Rashtra Samithi	4,53,738	P Ramachandra Reddy	Bharatiya Janata Party	3,29,972	1,23,766
Andhra Pradesh	34	Nizamabad	GEN	Madhu Goud Yaskhi	Indian National Congress	4,42,142	Syed Yousuf Ali	Telugu Desam Party	3,04,271	1,37,871
Andhra Pradesh	35	Adilabad	GEN	Madhusudhan Reddy Takkala	Telangana Rashtra Samithi	4,15,429	Samudrala Venugopal Chary	Telugu Desam Party	3,74,455	40,974
Andhra Pradesh	36	Peddapalli	(SC)	Gaddam Venkatswamy	Indian National Congress	5,72,207	C Suguna Kumari	Telugu Desam Party	3,09,072	2,63,135
Andhra Pradesh	37	Karimnagar	GEN	K. Chandrashekar Rao	Telangana Rashtra Samithi	4,51,199	Chennamaneni Vidyasagar Rao	Bharatiya Janata Party	3,20,031	1,31,168
Andhra Pradesh	38	Hanamkonda	GEN	Boianapalli Vinod Kumar	Telangana Rashtra Samithi	4,96,048	Chada Suresh Reddy	Telugu Desam Party	2,78,981	2,17,067
Andhra Pradesh	39	Warangal	GEN	Dharavath Ravinder Naik	Telangana Rashtra Samithi	4,27,601	Bodakunti Venkateshwarlu	Telugu Desam Party	4,08,339	19,262
Andhra Pradesh	40	Khammam	GEN	Renuka Chowdhury	Indian National Congress	5,18,047	Nama Nageswara Rao	Telugu Desam Party	4,09,159	1,08,888
Andhra Pradesh	41	Nalgonda	GEN	Suravaram Sudhakar Reddy	Communist Party of India	4,79,511	Nallu Indrasena Reddy	Bharatiya Janata Party	4,23,360	56,151
Andhra Pradesh	42	Miryalguda	GEN	Jaipal Reddy	Indian National Congress	5,72,169	Vangala Swamy Goud	Telugu Desam Party	3,55,262	2,16,907
Arunachal Pradesh	1	Arunachal West	GEN	Kiren Rijiju	Bharatiya Janata Party	1,23,951	Kamen Ringu	Arunachal Congress	76,527	47,424
Arunachal Pradesh	2	Arunachal East	GEN	Tapir Gao	Bharatiya Janata Party	83,335	Wangcha Rajkumar	Indian National Congress	38,341	44,994
Assam	1	Karimganj	(SC)	Lalit Mohan Suklabaidya	Indian National Congress	3,21,059	Parimal Suklabaidya	Bharatiya Janata Party	2,29,111	91,948
Assam	2	Silchar	GEN	Santosh Mohan Dev	Indian National Congress	2,46,215	Kabindra Purkayastha	Bharatiya Janata Party	2,24,895	21,320
Assam	3	Autonomous District	(ST)	Biren Sing Engti	Indian National Congress	1,25,937	Elwin Teron	Autonomous State Demand Committee	1,01,808	24,129
Assam	4	Dhubri	GEN	Anwar Hussain	Indian National Congress	3,76,588	Afzalur Rahman	Asom Gana Parishad	2,59,966	1,16,622
Assam	5	Kokrajhar	(ST)	Sansuma Khunggur Bwiswmuthiary	Independent	6,89,620	Sabda Ram Rabha	Independent	2,05,491	4,84,129
Assam	6	Barpeta	GEN	A. F. Golam Osmani	Indian National Congress	2,66,972	Kumar Deepak Das	Asom Gana Parishad	1,98,847	68,125
Assam	7	Gauhati	GEN	Kirip Chaliha	Indian National Congress	3,53,250	Bhupen Hazarika	Bharatiya Janata Party	2,92,099	61,151
Assam	8	Mangaldoi	GEN	Narayan Chandra Borkataky	Bharatiya Janata Party	3,45,863	Madhab Rajbangshi	Indian National Congress	3,15,997	29,866
Assam	9	Tezpur	GEN	Moni Kumar Subba	Indian National Congress	2,89,847	Padma Hazarika	Asom Gana Parishad	2,19,402	70,445
Assam	10	Nowgong	GEN	Rajen Gohain	Bharatiya Janata Party	3,42,704	Bisnu Prasad	Indian National Congress	3,11,292	31,412
Assam	11	Kaliabor	GEN	Dip Gogoi	Indian National Congress	3,01,893	Keshab Mahanta	Asom Gana Parishad	2,34,695	67,198
Assam	12	Jorhat	GEN	Bijoy Krishna Handique	Indian National Congress	2,23,624	Drupad Borgohain	Communist Party of India	1,72,332	51,292
Assam	13	Dibrugarh	GEN	Sarbananda Sonowal	Asom Gana Parishad	2,20,944	Kamakhya Prasad Tasa	Bharatiya Janata Party	2,02,390	18,554
Assam	14	Lakhimpur	GEN	Arun Kumar Sarmah	Asom Gana Parishad	3,00,865	Ranee Narah	Indian National Congress	2,72,717	28,148
Bihar	1	Bagaha	(SC)	Kailash Baitha	Janata Dal (United)	2,37,989	Hiralal Ram	Lok Janshakti Party	1,72,614	65,375
Bihar	2	Bettiah	GEN	Raghunath Jha	Rashtriya Janata Dal	2,11,590	Madan Prasad Jaiswal	Bharatiya Janata Party	1,86,919	24,671
Bihar	3	Motihari	GEN	Akhilesh Prasad Singh	Rashtriya Janata Dal	3,48,596	Radha Mohan Singh	Bharatiya Janata Party	2,51,572	97,024
Bihar	4	Gopalganj	GEN	Anirudh Prasad Yadav	Rashtriya Janata Dal	3,36,016	Prabhu Dayal Singh	Janata Dal (United)	1,43,097	1,92,919
Bihar	5	Siwan	GEN	Mohammad Shahabuddin	Rashtriya Janata Dal	3,17,511	Om Prakash Yadav	Janata Dal (United)	2,13,933	1,03,578
Bihar	6	Maharajganj	GEN	Prabhunath Singh	Janata Dal (United)	2,83,506	Jitendra Swami	Rashtriya Janata Dal	2,37,041	46,465
Bihar	7	Chapra	GEN	Lalu Prasad Yadav	Rashtriya Janata Dal	2,28,882	Rajiv Pratap Rudy	Bharatiya Janata Party	1,68,459	60,423
Bihar	8	Hajipur	(SC)	Ram Vilas Paswan	Lok Janshakti Party	4,77,495	Chhedi Paswan	Janata Dal (United)	2,39,694	2,37,801
Bihar	9	Vaishali	GEN	Raghuvansh Prasad Singh	Rashtriya Janata Dal	3,61,503	Vijay Kumar Shukla	Independent	2,55,568	1,05,935
Bihar	10	Muzaffarpur	GEN	George Fernandes	Janata Dal (United)	3,70,127	Bhagwan Lal Sahani	Rashtriya Janata Dal	3,60,434	9,693
Bihar	11	Sitamarhi	GEN	Sitaram Yadav	Rashtriya Janata Dal	3,26,165	Nawal Kishore Rai	Janata Dal (United)	2,28,160	98,005
Bihar	12	Sheohar	GEN	Sitaram Singh	Rashtriya Janata Dal	3,03,243	Mohammad Anwarul Haque	Bharatiya Janata Party	2,29,360	73,883
Bihar	13	Madhubani	GEN	Shakeel Ahmad	Indian National Congress	3,28,182	Hukmdev Narayan Yadav	Bharatiya Janata Party	2,41,103	87,079
Bihar	14	Jhanjharpur	GEN	Devendra Prasad Yadav	Rashtriya Janata Dal	3,23,400	Jagannath Mishra	Janata Dal (United)	3,10,565	12,835
Bihar	15	Darbhanga	GEN	Ali Ashraf Fatmi	Rashtriya Janata Dal	4,27,672	Kirti Azad	Bharatiya Janata Party	2,84,209	1,43,463
Bihar	16	Rosera	(SC)	Ram Chandra Paswan	Lok Janshakti Party	3,94,240	Dasai Chowdhary	Janata Dal (United)	2,55,829	1,38,411
Bihar	17	Samastipur	GEN	Alok Kumar Mehta	Rashtriya Janata Dal	4,37,457	Ram Chandra Singh	Janata Dal (United)	3,10,674	1,26,783
Bihar	18	Barh	GEN	Vijay Krishna	Rashtriya Janata Dal	4,26,856	Nitish Kumar	Janata Dal (United)	3,89,168	37,688
Bihar	19	Balia	GEN	Surajbhan Singh	Lok Janshakti Party	2,33,869	Shatrughna Prasad Singh	Communist Party of India	1,57,642	76,227
Bihar	20	Saharsa	GEN	Ranjeet Ranjan	Lok Janshakti Party	3,50,426	Dinesh Chandra Yadav	Janata Dal (United)	3,19,639	30,787
Bihar	21	Madhepura	GEN	Lalu Prasad Yadav	Rashtriya Janata Dal	3,44,301	Sharad Yadav	Janata Dal (United)	2,74,314	69,987
Bihar	22	Araria	(SC)	Sukdeo Paswan	Bharatiya Janata Party	2,16,677	Ramji Das Rishideo	Samajwadi Party	1,88,933	27,744
Bihar	23	Kishanganj	GEN	Mohammed Taslimuddin	Rashtriya Janata Dal	4,20,331	Syed Shahnawaz Hussain	Bharatiya Janata Party	2,59,834	1,60,497
Bihar	24	Purnea	GEN	Uday Singh	Bharatiya Janata Party	2,44,426	Rajesh Ranjan	Lok Janshakti Party	2,31,543	12,883
Bihar	25	Katihar	GEN	Nikhil Kumar Choudhary	Bharatiya Janata Party	2,88,922	Tariq Anwar	Nationalist Congress Party	2,86,357	2,565
Bihar	26	Banka	GEN	Giridhari Yadav	Rashtriya Janata Dal	3,39,880	Digvijay Singh	Janata Dal (United)	3,35,211	4,669
Bihar	27	Bhagalpur	GEN	Sushil Kumar Modi	Bharatiya Janata Party	3,45,151	Subodh Ray	Communist Party of India (Marxist)	2,27,298	1,17,853
Bihar	28	Khagaria	GEN	Rabindra Kumar Rana	Rashtriya Janata Dal	3,22,440	Renu Kumari Singh	Janata Dal (United)	2,55,317	67,123
Bihar	29	Monghyr	GEN	Jay Prakash Narayan Yadav	Rashtriya Janata Dal	4,53,286	Monazir Hassan	Janata Dal (United)	3,37,359	1,15,927
Bihar	30	Begusarai	GEN	Rajiv Ranjan Singh	Janata Dal (United)	3,01,562	Krishna Sahi	Indian National Congress	2,81,071	20,491
Bihar	31	Nalanda	GEN	Nitish Kumar	Janata Dal (United)	4,71,310	Kumar Pushpanjay	Lok Janshakti Party	3,68,914	1,02,396
Bihar	32	Patna	GEN	Ram Kripal Yadav	Rashtriya Janata Dal	4,33,853	C. P. Thakur	Bharatiya Janata Party	3,95,291	38,562
Bihar	33	Arrah	GEN	Kanti Singh	Rashtriya Janata Dal	2,99,422	Ram Naresh Ram	Communist Party of India (Marxist–Leninist) Liberation	1,49,679	1,49,743
Bihar	34	Buxar	GEN	Lalmuni Chaubey	Bharatiya Janata Party	2,05,980	Dadan Singh Yadav	Independent	1,51,114	54,866
Bihar	35	Sasaram	(SC)	Meira Kumar	Indian National Congress	4,16,673	Muni Lall	Bharatiya Janata Party	1,58,411	2,58,262
Bihar	36	Bikramganj	GEN	Ajit Kumar Singh	Janata Dal (United)	3,05,363	Ram Prasad Singh	Rashtriya Janata Dal	2,46,575	58,788
Bihar	37	Aurangabad	GEN	Nikhil Kumar	Indian National Congress	2,90,009	Sushil Kumar Singh	Janata Dal (United)	2,82,549	7,460
Bihar	38	Jahanabad	GEN	Ganesh Prasad Singh	Rashtriya Janata Dal	4,00,063	Arun Kumar	Janata Dal (United)	3,53,625	46,438
Bihar	39	Nawada	(SC)	Virchandra Paswan	Rashtriya Janata Dal	4,89,992	Sanjay Paswan	Bharatiya Janata Party	4,33,986	56,006
Bihar	40	Gaya	(SC)	Rajesh Kumar Manjhi	Rashtriya Janata Dal	4,64,829	Balbir Chand	Bharatiya Janata Party	3,61,895	1,02,934
Chandigarh	1	Chandigarh	GEN	Pawan Kumar Bansal	Indian National Congress	1,39,880	Satya Pal Jain	Bharatiya Janata Party	94,632	45,248
Chhattisgarh	1	Surguja	(ST)	Nand Kumar Sai	Bharatiya Janata Party	3,57,108	Khelsai Singh	Indian National Congress	2,53,656	1,03,452
Chhattisgarh	2	Raigarh	(ST)	Vishnu Deo Sai	Bharatiya Janata Party	3,29,057	Rampukar Singh	Indian National Congress	2,92,326	36,731
Chhattisgarh	3	Janjgir	GEN	Karuna Shukla	Bharatiya Janata Party	3,03,655	Charan Das Mahant	Indian National Congress	2,92,326	11,329
Chhattisgarh	4	Bilaspur	(SC)	Punnulal Mohle	Bharatiya Janata Party	3,24,729	Basant Pahre	Indian National Congress	2,43,176	81,553
Chhattisgarh	5	Sarangarh	(SC)	Guharam Ajgalle	Bharatiya Janata Party	2,42,575	Parasram Bhardwaj	Indian National Congress	1,83,457	59,118
Chhattisgarh	6	Raipur	GEN	Ramesh Bais	Bharatiya Janata Party	3,76,029	Shyama Charan Shukla	Indian National Congress	2,46,510	1,29,519
Chhattisgarh	7	Mahasamund	GEN	Ajit Jogi	Indian National Congress	4,14,647	Vidya Charan Shukla	Bharatiya Janata Party	2,96,142	1,18,505
Chhattisgarh	8	Kanker	(ST)	Sohan Potai	Bharatiya Janata Party	2,74,294	Ganga Potai Thakur	Indian National Congress	2,00,668	73,626
Chhattisgarh	9	Bastar	(ST)	Baliram Kashyap	Bharatiya Janata Party	2,12,893	Mahendra Karma	Indian National Congress	1,58,520	54,373
Chhattisgarh	10	Durg	GEN	Tarachand Sahu	Bharatiya Janata Party	3,82,757	Bhupesh Baghel	Indian National Congress	3,21,289	61,468
Chhattisgarh	11	Rajnandgaon	GEN	Pradeep Gandhi	Bharatiya Janata Party	3,14,520	Devwrat Singh	Indian National Congress	300197	14,323
Dadra and Nagar Haveli	1	Dadra And Nagar Haveli	(ST)	Mohanbhai Sanjibhai Delkar	Bharatiya Navshakti Party	34,665	Sitaram Gavli	Indian National Congress	21,772	12,893
Daman and Diu	1	Daman and Diu	GEN	Patel Dahyabhai Vallabhbhai	Indian National Congress	27,523	Gopalbhai Tandel	Bharatiya Janata Party	26,916	607
Delhi	1	New Delhi	GEN	Ajay Maken	Indian National Congress	1,05,415	Jagmohan	Bharatiya Janata Party	92,631	12,784
Delhi	2	South Delhi	GEN	Vijay Kumar Malhotra	Bharatiya Janata Party	2,40,654	R. K. Anand	Indian National Congress	2,24,649	16,005
Delhi	3	Outer Delhi	GEN	Sajjan Kumar	Indian National Congress	8,55,543	Sahib Singh Verma	Bharatiya Janata Party	6,31,753	2,23,790
Delhi	4	East Delhi	GEN	Sandeep Dikshit	Indian National Congress	6,69,527	Lal Bihari Tiwari	Bharatiya Janata Party	4,39,748	2,29,779
Delhi	5	Chandni Chowk	GEN	Kapil Sibal	Indian National Congress	1,27,396	Smriti Irani	Bharatiya Janata Party	47,981	79,415
Delhi	6	Delhi Sadar	GEN	Jagdish Tytler	Indian National Congress	1,40,073	Vijay Goel	Bharatiya Janata Party	1,24,099	15,974
Delhi	7	Karol Bagh	(SC)	Krishna Tirath	Indian National Congress	1,38,596	Anita Arya	Bharatiya Janata Party	1,00,967	37,629
Goa	1	Panaji	GEN	Shripad Yesso Naik	Bharatiya Janata Party	1,44,842	Wilfred de Souza	Nationalist Congress Party	88,629	56,213
Goa	2	Mormugao	GEN	Churchill Alemao	Indian National Congress	1,64,432	Ramakant Angle	Bharatiya Janata Party	1,13,908	50,524
Gujarat	1	Kutch	GEN	Pushpdan Gadhavi	Bharatiya Janata Party	2,21,057	Shailendrasinh Jadeja	Indian National Congress	1,92,067	28,990
Gujarat	2	Surendranagar	GEN	Somabhai Gandalal Koli Patel	Bharatiya Janata Party	2,19,872	Savshibhai Makwana	Indian National Congress	1,85,928	33,944
Gujarat	3	Jamnagar	GEN	Vikrambhai Madam	Indian National Congress	2,04,468	Chandresh Patel Kordia	Bharatiya Janata Party	1,98,875	5,593
Gujarat	4	Rajkot	GEN	Vallabhbhai Kathiria	Bharatiya Janata Party	3,20,604	Balvantbhai Bachubhai Manvar	Nationalist Congress Party	1,76,634	1,43,970
Gujarat	5	Porbandar	GEN	Harilal Patel	Bharatiya Janata Party	2,29,113	Vitthal Radadiya	Indian National Congress	2,23,410	5,703
Gujarat	6	Junagadh	GEN	Jashubhai Barad	Indian National Congress	3,29,712	Bhavna Chikhalia	Bharatiya Janata Party	2,88,791	40,921
Gujarat	7	Amreli	GEN	Virjibhai Thummar	Indian National Congress	2,20,649	Dileep Sanghani	Bharatiya Janata Party	2,18,619	2,030
Gujarat	8	Bhavnagar	GEN	Rajendrasinh Rana	Bharatiya Janata Party	2,47,336	Gigabhai Gohil	Indian National Congress	1,66,910	80,426
Gujarat	9	Dhandhuka	(SC)	Ratilal Varma	Bharatiya Janata Party	2,49,322	Yogendra Makwana	Indian National Congress	2,26,528	22,794
Gujarat	10	Ahmedabad	GEN	Harin Pathak	Bharatiya Janata Party	3,01,853	Rajkumar Gigraj Gupta	Indian National Congress	2,24,248	77,605
Gujarat	11	Gandhinagar	GEN	L. K. Advani	Bharatiya Janata Party	5,16,120	Gabhaji Thakor	Indian National Congress	2,98,982	2,17,138
Gujarat	12	Mehsana	GEN	Jivabhai Ambalal Patel	Indian National Congress	3,39,643	Nitinbhai Patel	Bharatiya Janata Party	3,25,132	14,511
Gujarat	13	Patan	(SC)	Mahesh Kanodia	Bharatiya Janata Party	2,73,970	Praveen Rashtrapal	Indian National Congress	2,50,346	23,624
Gujarat	14	Banaskantha	GEN	Harisinh Chavda	Indian National Congress	3,01,148	Haribhai Parthibhai Chaudhary	Bharatiya Janata Party	2,94,220	6,928
Gujarat	15	Sabarkantha	GEN	Madhusudan Mistry	Indian National Congress	3,16,483	Ramilaben Bara	Bharatiya Janata Party	2,76,555	39,928
Gujarat	16	Kapadvanj	GEN	Shankersinh Vaghela	Indian National Congress	3,20,338	Liladhar Vaghela	Bharatiya Janata Party	2,40,903	79,435
Gujarat	17	Dohad	(ST)	Babubhai Khimabhai Katara	Bharatiya Janata Party	2,28,154	Prabha Kishor Taviad	Indian National Congress	2,27,793	361
Gujarat	18	Godhra	GEN	Bhupendrasinh Solanki	Bharatiya Janata Party	2,95,550	Rajendrasinh Balvantsinh Patel	Indian National Congress	2,41,831	53,719
Gujarat	19	Kaira	GEN	Dinsha Patel	Indian National Congress	2,44,037	Shubhanginiraje Ranjitsinh Gaekwad	Bharatiya Janata Party	1,87,288	56,749
Gujarat	20	Anand	GEN	Bharatsinh Solanki	Indian National Congress	3,07,762	Jayprakash Vaghajibhai Patel	Bharatiya Janata Party	2,46,677	61,085
Gujarat	21	Chhota Udaipur	(ST)	Naranbhai Rathwa	Indian National Congress	2,46,855	Ramsinh Rathwa	Bharatiya Janata Party	2,10,616	36,239
Gujarat	22	Baroda	GEN	Jayaben Thakkar	Bharatiya Janata Party	3,16,089	Satyajitsinh Gaekwad	Indian National Congress	3,09,486	6,603
Gujarat	23	Broach	GEN	Mansukhbhai Vasava	Bharatiya Janata Party	2,99,630	Muhammad Patel	Indian National Congress	2,27,428	72,202
Gujarat	24	Surat	GEN	Kashiram Rana	Bharatiya Janata Party	5,08,076	Chandravadanbhai Pithawala	Indian National Congress	3,57,513	1,50,563
Gujarat	25	Mandvi	(ST)	Tushar Amarsinh Chaudhary	Indian National Congress	3,86,592	Mansinh Patel	Bharatiya Janata Party	2,13,210	1,73,382
Gujarat	26	Bulsar	(ST)	Kishanbhai Vestabhai Patel	Indian National Congress	3,21,769	Manibhai Chaudhary	Bharatiya Janata Party	2,77,283	44,486
Haryana	1	Ambala	(SC)	Kumari Selja	Indian National Congress	4,15,264	Rattan Lal Kataria	Bharatiya Janata Party	1,80,329	2,34,935
Haryana	2	Kurukshetra	GEN	Naveen Jindal	Indian National Congress	3,62,054	Abhay Singh Chautala	Indian National Lok Dal	2,01,864	1,60,190
Haryana	3	Karnal	GEN	Arvind Kumar Sharma	Indian National Congress	3,18,948	Ishwar Dayal Swami	Bharatiya Janata Party	1,54,186	1,64,762
Haryana	4	Sonepat	GEN	Kishan Singh Sangwan	Bharatiya Janata Party	2,33,477	Dharam Pal Singh Malik	Indian National Congress	2,25,908	7,569
Haryana	5	Rohtak	GEN	Bhupinder Singh Hooda	Indian National Congress	3,24,235	Captain Abhimanyu	Bharatiya Janata Party	1,73,800	1,50,435
Haryana	6	Faridabad	GEN	Avtar Singh Bhadana	Indian National Congress	3,57,284	Mohd Ilyas	Indian National Lok Dal	2,05,355	1,51,929
Haryana	7	Mahendragarh	GEN	Rao Inderjit Singh	Indian National Congress	3,58,714	Sudha Yadav	Bharatiya Janata Party	1,48,373	2,10,341
Haryana	8	Bhiwani	GEN	Kuldeep Bishnoi	Indian National Congress	2,90,936	Surender Singh	Haryana Vikas Party	2,66,532	24,404
Haryana	9	Hisar	GEN	Jai Parkash	Indian National Congress	4,07,210	Surender Singh Barwala	Indian National Lok Dal	2,24,442	1,82,768
Haryana	10	Sirsa	(SC)	Atma Singh Gill	Indian National Congress	3,49,397	Sushil Indora	Indian National Lok Dal	2,77,922	71,475
Himachal Pradesh	1	Simla	(SC)	Dhani Ram Shandil	Indian National Congress	3,11,182	Hira Nand Kashyap	Bharatiya Janata Party	2,03,002	1,08,180
Himachal Pradesh	2	Mandi	GEN	Pratibha Singh	Indian National Congress	3,57,623	Maheshwar Singh	Bharatiya Janata Party	2,91,057	66,566
Himachal Pradesh	3	Kangra	GEN	Chander Kumar	Indian National Congress	3,14,555	Shanta Kumar	Bharatiya Janata Party	2,96,764	17,791
Himachal Pradesh	4	Hamirpur	GEN	Suresh Chandel	Bharatiya Janata Party	3,13,243	Ram Lal Thakur	Indian National Congress	3,11,628	1,615
Jammu and Kashmir	1	Baramulla	GEN	Abdul Rashid Shaheen	Jammu & Kashmir National Conference	1,27,653	Nizamuddin Bhat	Jammu and Kashmir Peoples Democratic Party	1,17,758	9,895
Jammu and Kashmir	2	Srinagar	GEN	Omar Abdullah	Jammu & Kashmir National Conference	98,422	Ghulam Nabi Lone	Jammu and Kashmir Peoples Democratic Party	75,263	23,159
Jammu and Kashmir	3	Anantnag	GEN	Mehbooba Mufti	Jammu and Kashmir Peoples Democratic Party	74,436	Mirza Mehboob Beg	Jammu & Kashmir National Conference	35,498	38,938
Jammu and Kashmir	4	Ladakh	GEN	Thupstan Chhewang	Independent	66,839	Hassan Khan	Jammu & Kashmir National Conference	41,126	25,713
Jammu and Kashmir	5	Udhampur	GEN	Chaudhary Lal Singh	Indian National Congress	2,40,872	Chaman Lal Gupta	Bharatiya Janata Party	1,93,697	47,175
Jammu and Kashmir	6	Jammu	GEN	Madan Lal Sharma	Indian National Congress	3,19,994	Nirmal Kumar Singh	Bharatiya Janata Party	3,02,426	17,568
Jharkhand	1	Rajmahal	(ST)	Hemlal Murmu	Jharkhand Mukti Morcha	2,26,411	Thomas Hansda	Indian National Congress	2,23,437	2,974
Jharkhand	2	Dumka	(ST)	Shibu Soren	Jharkhand Mukti Morcha	3,39,542	Sone Lal Hembrom	Bharatiya Janata Party	2,24,527	1,15,015
Jharkhand	3	Godda	GEN	Furkan Ansari	Indian National Congress	3,73,138	Pradeep Yadav	Bharatiya Janata Party	3,46,384	26,754
Jharkhand	4	Chatra	GEN	Dhirendra Agarwal	Rashtriya Janata Dal	1,21,464	Inder Singh Namdhari	Janata Dal (United)	1,02,609	18,855
Jharkhand	5	Kodarma	GEN	Babulal Marandi	Bharatiya Janata Party	3,66,656	Champa Verma	Jharkhand Mukti Morcha	2,11,712	1,54,944
Jharkhand	6	Giridih	GEN	Tek Lal Mahto	Jharkhand Mukti Morcha	3,50,255	Ravindra Kumar Pandey	Bharatiya Janata Party	2,00,461	1,49,794
Jharkhand	7	Dhanbad	GEN	Chandra Shekhar Dubey	Indian National Congress	3,55,499	Rita Verma	Bharatiya Janata Party	2,36,121	1,19,378
Jharkhand	8	Ranchi	GEN	Subodh Kant Sahay	Indian National Congress	2,84,035	Ram Tahal Choudhary	Bharatiya Janata Party	2,68,614	15,421
Jharkhand	9	Jamshedpur	GEN	Sunil Kumar Mahato	Jharkhand Mukti Morcha	3,96,056	Abha Mahato	Bharatiya Janata Party	2,90,423	1,05,633
Jharkhand	10	Singhbhum	(ST)	Bagun Sumbrai	Indian National Congress	2,21,343	Laxman Giluwa	Bharatiya Janata Party	1,62,147	59,196
Jharkhand	11	Khunti	(ST)	Sushila Kerketta	Indian National Congress	2,18,158	Kariya Munda	Bharatiya Janata Party	1,66,932	51,226
Jharkhand	12	Lohardaga	(ST)	Rameshwar Oraon	Indian National Congress	2,23,920	Dukha Bhagat	Bharatiya Janata Party	1,33,665	90,255
Jharkhand	13	Palamau	(SC)	Manoj Kumar	Rashtriya Janata Dal	2,06,733	Braj Mohan Ram	Bharatiya Janata Party	1,51,589	55,144
Jharkhand	14	Hazaribagh	GEN	Bhubneshwar Prasad Mehta	Communist Party of India	3,56,058	Yashwant Sinha	Bharatiya Janata Party	2,50,730	1,05,328
Karnataka	1	Bidar	(SC)	Ramchandra Veerappa	Bharatiya Janata Party	3,12,838	Narsingrao Suryawanshi	Indian National Congress	2,89,217	23,621
Karnataka	2	Gulbarga	GEN	Iqbal Ahmed Saradgi	Indian National Congress	3,12,601	Basavaraj Patil Sedam	Bharatiya Janata Party	2,55,130	57,471
Karnataka	3	Raichur	GEN	A. Venkatesh Naik	Indian National Congress	2,89,424	Raja Madangopal Nayak	Janata Dal (Secular)	2,88,916	508
Karnataka	4	Koppal	GEN	K. Virupaxappa	Indian National Congress	3,56,158	Nagappa Saloni	Bharatiya Janata Party	3,12,535	43,623
Karnataka	5	Bellary	GEN	G. Karunakara Reddy	Bharatiya Janata Party	3,18,978	K. C. Kondaiah	Indian National Congress	2,87,299	31,679
Karnataka	6	Davanagere	GEN	G. M. Siddeshwara	Bharatiya Janata Party	3,70,499	S. S. Mallikarjun	Indian National Congress	3,37,823	32,676
Karnataka	7	Chitradurga	GEN	N. Y. Hanumanthappa	Indian National Congress	3,22,609	P Kodandaramaiah	Janata Dal (Secular)	2,85,149	37,460
Karnataka	8	Tumkur	GEN	S. Mallikarjunaiah	Bharatiya Janata Party	3,03,016	Jagadeesh D L	Janata Dal (Secular)	3,00,665	2,351
Karnataka	9	Chikballapur	GEN	R. L. Jalappa	Indian National Congress	3,76,204	Shashi Kumar	Janata Dal (Secular)	3,16,182	60,022
Karnataka	10	Kolar	(SC)	K. H. Muniyappa	Indian National Congress	3,85,582	D S Veeraiah	Bharatiya Janata Party	3,73,947	11,635
Karnataka	11	Kanakapura	GEN	Tejashwini See Ramesh	Indian National Congress	5,84,238	Ramachandra Gowda	Bharatiya Janata Party	4,67,575	1,16,663
Karnataka	12	Bangalore North	GEN	H. T. Sangliana	Bharatiya Janata Party	4,73,502	C. K. Jaffer Sharief	Indian National Congress	4,43,144	30,358
Karnataka	13	Bangalore South	GEN	Ananth Kumar	Bharatiya Janata Party	3,86,682	M. Krishnappa	Indian National Congress	3,24,411	62,271
Karnataka	14	Mandya	GEN	Ambareesh	Indian National Congress	4,11,116	S Ramegowda	Janata Dal (Secular)	2,86,678	1,24,438
Karnataka	15	Chamarajanagar	(SC)	Kagalvadi M. Shivanna	Janata Dal (Secular)	3,16,661	A Siddaraju	Indian National Congress	2,72,672	43,989
Karnataka	16	Mysore	GEN	C. H. Vijayashankar	Bharatiya Janata Party	3,16,442	A S Guruswamy	Janata Dal (Secular)	3,06,292	10,150
Karnataka	17	Mangalore	GEN	D. V. Sadananda Gowda	Bharatiya Janata Party	3,84,760	Veerappa Moily	Indian National Congress	3,51,345	33,415
Karnataka	18	Udupi	GEN	Manorama Madhwaraj	Bharatiya Janata Party	3,69,627	Vinay Kumar Sorake	Indian National Congress	3,40,624	29,003
Karnataka	19	Hassan	GEN	H. D. Deve Gowda	Janata Dal (Secular)	4,62,625	H. C. Srikantaiah	Indian National Congress	2,72,320	1,90,305
Karnataka	20	Chikmagalur	GEN	D. C. Srikantappa	Bharatiya Janata Party	3,41,391	B L Shankar	Indian National Congress	2,67,719	73,672
Karnataka	21	Shimoga	GEN	Sarekoppa Bangarappa	Bharatiya Janata Party	4,50,097	Ayanur Manjunath	Indian National Congress	3,73,952	76,145
Karnataka	22	Kanara	GEN	Anant Kumar Hegde	Bharatiya Janata Party	4,33,174	Margaret Alva	Indian National Congress	2,60,948	1,72,226
Karnataka	23	Dharwad South	GEN	Manjunath Kunnur	Bharatiya Janata Party	4,42,759	I G Sanadi	Indian National Congress	2,97,647	1,45,112
Karnataka	24	Dharwad North	GEN	Pralhad Joshi	Bharatiya Janata Party	3,85,084	B S Patil	Indian National Congress	3,02,006	83,078
Karnataka	25	Belgaum	GEN	Suresh Angadi	Bharatiya Janata Party	4,10,843	Amarsinh Vasantrao Patil	Indian National Congress	3,26,090	84,753
Karnataka	26	Chikkodi	(SC)	Ramesh Jigajinagi	Bharatiya Janata Party	3,79,580	SB Ghatage	Indian National Congress	3,36,088	43,492
Karnataka	27	Bagalkot	GEN	P. C. Gaddigoudar	Bharatiya Janata Party	4,59,451	RS Patil	Indian National Congress	2,92,068	1,67,383
Karnataka	28	Bijapur	GEN	Basangouda Patil Yatnal	Bharatiya Janata Party	3,44,905	Somanagouda Patil	Indian National Congress	3,07,372	37,533
Kerala	1	Kasaragod	GEN	P. Karunakaran	Communist Party of India (Marxist)	4,37,284	N A Mohammed	Indian National Congress	3,29,028	1,08,256
Kerala	2	Cannanore	GEN	A. P. Abdullakutty	Communist Party of India (Marxist)	4,35,058	Mullappally Ramachandran	Indian National Congress	3,51,209	83,849
Kerala	3	Badagara	GEN	P. Satheedevi	Communist Party of India (Marxist)	4,29,294	M. T. Padma	Indian National Congress	2,98,705	1,30,589
Kerala	4	Calicut	GEN	M. P. Veerendra Kumar	Janata Dal (Secular)	3,40,111	V. Balram	Indian National Congress	2,74,785	65,326
Kerala	5	Manjeri	GEN	T. K. Hamza	Communist Party of India (Marxist)	4,26,920	K. P. A. Majeed	Muslim League Kerala State Committee	3,79,177	47,743
Kerala	6	Ponnani	GEN	E. Ahamed	Muslim League Kerala State Committee	3,54,051	P.P. Suneer	Communist Party of India	2,51,293	1,02,758
Kerala	7	Palghat	GEN	N. N. Krishnadas	Communist Party of India (Marxist)	3,75,144	V. S. Vijaya Raghavan	Indian National Congress	2,76,986	98,158
Kerala	8	Ottapalam	(SC)	S. Ajaya Kumar	Communist Party of India (Marxist)	3,95,928	K. A. Thulasi	Indian National Congress	3,25,518	70,410
Kerala	9	Trichur	GEN	C. K. Chandrappan	Communist Party of India	3,20,960	A. C. Jose	Indian National Congress	2,74,999	45,961
Kerala	10	Mukundapuram	GEN	Lonappan Nambadan	Communist Party of India (Marxist)	3,75,175	Padmaja Venugopal	Indian National Congress	2,58,078	1,17,097
Kerala	11	Ernakulam	GEN	Sebastian Paul	Independent	3,23,042	Edward Edezhath	Indian National Congress	2,52,943	70,099
Kerala	12	Muvattupuzha	GEN	P. C. Thomas	Indian Federal Democratic Party	2,56,411	P. M. Ismail	Communist Party of India (Marxist)	2,55,882	529
Kerala	13	Kottayam	GEN	K. Suresh Kurup	Communist Party of India (Marxist)	3,41,213	Anto Antony	Indian National Congress	2,98,299	42,914
Kerala	14	Idukki	GEN	Francis George	Kerala Congress	3,53,905	Benny Behanan	Indian National Congress	2,84,521	69,384
Kerala	15	Alleppey	GEN	K. S. Manoj	Communist Party of India (Marxist)	3,35,494	V. M. Sudheeran	Indian National Congress	3,34,485	1,009
Kerala	16	Mavelikara	GEN	C. S. Sujatha	Communist Party of India (Marxist)	2,78,281	Ramesh Chennithala	Indian National Congress	2,70,867	7,414
Kerala	17	Adoor	(SC)	Chengara Surendran	Communist Party of India	3,32,216	Kodikunnil Suresh	Indian National Congress	2,77,682	54,534
Kerala	18	Quilon	GEN	P. Rajendran	Communist Party of India (Marxist)	3,55,279	Sooranad Rajasekharan	Indian National Congress	2,44,208	1,11,071
Kerala	19	Chirayinkil	GEN	Varkala Radhakrishnan	Communist Party of India (Marxist)	3,13,615	M. I. Shanavas	Indian National Congress	2,62,870	50,745
Kerala	20	Trivandrum	GEN	P. K. Vasudevan Nair	Communist Party of India	2,86,057	V. S. Sivakumar	Indian National Congress	2,31,454	54,603
Lakshadweep	1	Lakshadweep	(ST)	P. Pookunhi Koya	Janata Dal (United)	15,597	P. M. Sayeed	Indian National Congress	15,526	71
Madhya Pradesh	1	Morena	(SC)	Ashok Argal	Bharatiya Janata Party	2,61,337	Barelal Jatav	Indian National Congress	1,14,017	1,47,320
Madhya Pradesh	2	Bhind	GEN	Ram Lakhan Singh	Bharatiya Janata Party	2,34,712	Satyadev Katare	Indian National Congress	2,27,766	6,946
Madhya Pradesh	3	Gwalior	GEN	Ramsevak Singh	Indian National Congress	2,46,467	Jaibhan Singh Pawaiya	Bharatiya Janata Party	2,10,603	35,864
Madhya Pradesh	4	Guna	GEN	Jyotiraditya Scindia	Indian National Congress	3,33,954	Harivallabh Shukla	Bharatiya Janata Party	2,47,594	86,360
Madhya Pradesh	5	Sagar	(SC)	Virendra Kumar	Bharatiya Janata Party	2,90,974	Uttam Khatik	Indian National Congress	1,42,983	1,47,991
Madhya Pradesh	6	Khajuraho	GEN	Ramkrishna Kusmaria	Bharatiya Janata Party	3,32,458	Satyavrat Chaturvedi	Indian National Congress	2,20,677	1,11,781
Madhya Pradesh	7	Damoh	GEN	Chandrabhan Bhaiya	Bharatiya Janata Party	2,71,869	Tilak Singh Lodhi	Indian National Congress	1,77,274	94,595
Madhya Pradesh	8	Satna	GEN	Ganesh Singh	Bharatiya Janata Party	2,39,706	Rajendra Kumar Singh	Indian National Congress	1,56,116	83,590
Madhya Pradesh	9	Rewa	GEN	Chandramani Tripathi	Bharatiya Janata Party	2,32,021	Pradeep Kumar Patel	Bahujan Samaj Party	1,87,269	44,752
Madhya Pradesh	10	Sidhi	(ST)	Chandrapratap Singh	Bharatiya Janata Party	2,10,198	Tilakraj Singh	Indian National Congress	1,60,633	49,565
Madhya Pradesh	11	Shahdol	(ST)	Dalpat Singh Paraste	Bharatiya Janata Party	2,10,034	Rajesh Nandini Singh	Indian National Congress	1,80,685	29,349
Madhya Pradesh	12	Balaghat	GEN	Gaurishankar Bisen	Bharatiya Janata Party	1,93,982	Kankar Munjare	Janata Party	1,05,893	88,089
Madhya Pradesh	13	Mandla	(ST)	Faggan Singh Kulaste	Bharatiya Janata Party	2,38,073	Heera Singh Markam	Gondwana Ganatantra Party	1,73,176	64,897
Madhya Pradesh	14	Jabalpur	GEN	Rakesh Singh	Bharatiya Janata Party	3,11,646	Vishwanath Dubey	Indian National Congress	2,12,115	99,531
Madhya Pradesh	15	Seoni	GEN	Neeta Pateriya	Bharatiya Janata Party	2,68,195	Kalyani Pandey	Indian National Congress	1,73,394	94,801
Madhya Pradesh	16	Chhindwara	GEN	Kamal Nath	Indian National Congress	3,08,563	Prahlad Singh Patel	Bharatiya Janata Party	2,44,855	63,708
Madhya Pradesh	17	Betul	GEN	Vijay Kumar Khandelwal	Bharatiya Janata Party	2,88,007	Rajendra Jaiswal	Indian National Congress	1,30,467	1,57,540
Madhya Pradesh	18	Hoshangabad	GEN	Sartaj Singh	Bharatiya Janata Party	3,54,659	Omprakash Raghuvanshi	Indian National Congress	2,18,250	136,409
Madhya Pradesh	19	Bhopal	GEN	Kailash Joshi	Bharatiya Janata Party	5,61,563	Sajid Ali	Indian National Congress	2,55,558	3,06,005
Madhya Pradesh	20	Vidisha	GEN	Shivraj Singh Chouhan	Bharatiya Janata Party	4,28,030	Narbada Prasad Sharma	Indian National Congress	1,67,304	2,60,726
Madhya Pradesh	21	Rajgarh	GEN	Lakshman Singh	Bharatiya Janata Party	2,83,135	Shambhoo Singh	Indian National Congress	2,46,423	36,712
Madhya Pradesh	22	Shajapur	(SC)	Thawar Chand Gehlot	Bharatiya Janata Party	4,24,004	Shyam Malviya	Indian National Congress	2,55,817	1,68,187
Madhya Pradesh	23	Khandwa	GEN	Nandkumar Singh Chauhan	Bharatiya Janata Party	3,36,724	Amitabh Mandloi	Indian National Congress	2,33,987	1,02,737
Madhya Pradesh	24	Khargone	GEN	Krishna Murari Moghe	Bharatiya Janata Party	3,21,762	Tarachand Shivaji Patel	Indian National Congress	2,63,145	58,617
Madhya Pradesh	25	Dhar	(ST)	Chhatar Singh Darbar	Bharatiya Janata Party	3,45,468	Umang Singhar	Indian National Congress	3,12,857	32,611
Madhya Pradesh	26	Indore	GEN	Sumitra Mahajan	Bharatiya Janata Party	5,08,107	Rameshwar Patel	Indian National Congress	3,14,171	1,93,936
Madhya Pradesh	27	Ujjain	(SC)	Satyanarayan Jatiya	Bharatiya Janata Party	3,69,744	Premchand Guddu	Indian National Congress	2,99,341	70,403
Madhya Pradesh	28	Jhabua	(ST)	Kantilal Bhuria	Indian National Congress	3,22,257	Relam Chauhan	Bharatiya Janata Party	2,41,975	80,282
Madhya Pradesh	29	Mandsaur	GEN	Laxminarayan Pandey	Bharatiya Janata Party	4,23,478	Rajendra Singh Gautam	Indian National Congress	2,83,845	1,39,633
Maharashtra	1	Rajapur	GEN	Suresh Prabhu	Shiv Sena	2,64,001	Sudhir Sawant	Indian National Congress	1,83,102	80,899
Maharashtra	2	Ratnagiri	GEN	Anant Geete	Shiv Sena	3,34,690	Govindrao Nikam	Nationalist Congress Party	1,85,722	1,48,968
Maharashtra	3	Kolaba	GEN	A. R. Antulay	Indian National Congress	3,12,225	Vivek Patil	Peasants and Workers Party of India	2,80,355	31,870
Maharashtra	4	Mumbai South	GEN	Milind Deora	Indian National Congress	1,37,956	Jayawantiben Mehta	Bharatiya Janata Party	1,27,710	10,246
Maharashtra	5	Mumbai South Central	GEN	Mohan Rawale	Shiv Sena	1,28,536	Sachin Ahir	Nationalist Congress Party	1,06,348	22,188
Maharashtra	6	Mumbai North Central	GEN	Eknath Gaikwad	Indian National Congress	2,56,282	Manohar Joshi	Shiv Sena	2,42,953	13,329
Maharashtra	7	Mumbai North East	GEN	Gurudas Kamat	Indian National Congress	4,93,420	Kirit Somaiya	Bharatiya Janata Party	3,94,020	99,400
Maharashtra	8	Mumbai North West	GEN	Sunil Dutt	Indian National Congress	3,85,755	Sanjay Nirupam	Shiv Sena	3,38,397	47,358
Maharashtra	9	Mumbai North	GEN	Govinda	Indian National Congress	5,59,763	Ram Naik	Bharatiya Janata Party	5,11,492	48,271
Maharashtra	10	Thane	GEN	Prakash Paranjape	Shiv Sena	6,31,414	Vasant Davkhare	Nationalist Congress Party	6,09,156	22,258
Maharashtra	11	Dahanu	(ST)	Damodar Shingada	Indian National Congress	2,86,004	Chintaman Vanaga	Bharatiya Janata Party	2,22,641	63,363
Maharashtra	12	Nashik	GEN	Devidas Pingale	Nationalist Congress Party	3,07,613	Dashrath Patil	Shiv Sena	2,92,555	15,058
Maharashtra	13	Malegaon	(ST)	Harischandra Chavan	Bharatiya Janata Party	2,18,259	Haribahu Shankar Mahale	Janata Dal (Secular)	2,13,731	4,528
Maharashtra	14	Dhule	(ST)	Bapu Hari Chaure	Indian National Congress	2,10,714	Ramdas Rupla Gavit	Bharatiya Janata Party	2,02,949	7,765
Maharashtra	15	Nandurbar	(ST)	Manikrao Gavit	Indian National Congress	3,51,911	Natawadkar Suhas Jayant	Bharatiya Janata Party	2,44,290	1,07,621
Maharashtra	16	Erandol	GEN	Annasaheb M. K. Patil	Bharatiya Janata Party	2,89,559	Vasantrao More	Nationalist Congress Party	2,81,418	8,141
Maharashtra	17	Jalgaon	GEN	Y. G. Mahajan	Bharatiya Janata Party	2,98,865	Ulhas Patil	Indian National Congress	2,78,219	20,646
Maharashtra	18	Buldhana	(SC)	Anandrao Vithoba Adsul	Shiv Sena	3,69,975	Mukul Wasnik	Indian National Congress	3,10,068	59,907
Maharashtra	19	Akola	GEN	Sanjay Dhotre	Bharatiya Janata Party	3,13,323	Laxmanrao Tayade	Indian National Congress	2,06,952	1,06,371
Maharashtra	20	Washim	GEN	Bhavana Gawali	Shiv Sena	3,58,682	Manohar Naik	Nationalist Congress Party	2,97,784	60,898
Maharashtra	21	Amravati	GEN	Anant Gudhe	Shiv Sena	2,03,216	Omprakash Babarao Kadu	Independent	1,88,982	14,234
Maharashtra	22	Ramtek	GEN	Subodh Mohite	Shiv Sena	2,76,720	Shrikant Jichkar	Indian National Congress	2,62,618	14,102
Maharashtra	23	Nagpur	GEN	Vilas Muttemwar	Indian National Congress	3,73,769	Atal Bahadur Singh	Bharatiya Janata Party	2,74,286	99,483
Maharashtra	24	Bhandara	GEN	Shishupal Patle	Bharatiya Janata Party	2,77,388	Praful Patel	Nationalist Congress Party	2,74,379	3,009
Maharashtra	25	Chimur	GEN	Mahadeo Shivankar	Bharatiya Janata Party	3,36,711	Jogendra Kawade	Peoples Republican Party	2,37,937	98,774
Maharashtra	26	Chandrapur	GEN	Hansraj Gangaram Ahir	Bharatiya Janata Party	3,66,014	Naresh Puglia	Indian National Congress	3,06,191	59,823
Maharashtra	27	Wardha	GEN	Suresh Wagmare	Bharatiya Janata Party	2,69,045	Prabha Rau	Indian National Congress	2,65,857	3,188
Maharashtra	28	Yavatmal	GEN	Harising Nasaru Rathod	Bharatiya Janata Party	2,98,513	Uttamrao Deorao Patil	Indian National Congress	2,41,709	56,804
Maharashtra	29	Hingoli	GEN	Suryakanta Patil	Nationalist Congress Party	3,27,944	Shivaji Mane	Shiv Sena	3,15,399	12,545
Maharashtra	30	Nanded	GEN	Digamber Bapuji Patil	Bharatiya Janata Party	3,61,282	Bhaskarrao Khatgaonkar	Indian National Congress	3,36,947	24,335
Maharashtra	31	Parbhani	GEN	Tukaram Renge Patil	Shiv Sena	3,39,318	Suresh Warpudkar	Nationalist Congress Party	2,83,147	56,171
Maharashtra	32	Jalna	GEN	Raosaheb Danve	Bharatiya Janata Party	3,69,630	Uttamsingh Pawar	Indian National Congress	3,08,298	61,332
Maharashtra	33	Aurangabad	GEN	Chandrakant Khaire	Shiv Sena	4,77,900	Ramkrishna Baba Patil	Indian National Congress	3,55,977	1,21,923
Maharashtra	34	Beed	GEN	Jaisingrao Gaikwad Patil	Nationalist Congress Party	4,25,051	Prakashdada Solanke	Bharatiya Janata Party	3,77,639	47,412
Maharashtra	35	Latur	GEN	Rupatai Patil	Bharatiya Janata Party	4,04,500	Shivraj Patil	Indian National Congress	3,73,609	30,891
Maharashtra	36	Osmanabad	(SC)	Kalpana Narhire	Shiv Sena	2,94,436	Kondiba Laxman Dhobale	Nationalist Congress Party	2,92,787	1,649
Maharashtra	37	Sholapur	GEN	Subhash Sureshchandra Deshmukh	Bharatiya Janata Party	3,16,188	Ujwalatai Shinde	Indian National Congress	3,10,390	5,798
Maharashtra	38	Pandharpur	(SC)	Ramdas Athawale	Republican Party of India (A)	3,47,215	Nagnath Dattatray Kshirsagar	Bharatiya Janata Party	2,47,522	99,693
Maharashtra	39	Ahmednagar	GEN	Tukaram Gadakh	Nationalist Congress Party	3,62,938	N. S. Pharande	Bharatiya Janata Party	2,87,861	75,077
Maharashtra	40	Kopargaon	GEN	Balasaheb Vikhe Patil	Indian National Congress	3,56,688	Murkute Bhanudas Kashinath	Shiv Sena	2,69,357	87,331
Maharashtra	41	Khed	GEN	Shivajirao Adhalarao Patil	Shiv Sena	3,60,501	Ashok Mohol	Nationalist Congress Party	3,39,691	20,810
Maharashtra	42	Pune	GEN	Suresh Kalmadi	Indian National Congress	3,73,774	Pradeep Rawat	Bharatiya Janata Party	3,00,598	73,176
Maharashtra	43	Baramati	GEN	Sharad Pawar	Nationalist Congress Party	6,34,555	Prithviraj Sahebrao Jachak	Bharatiya Janata Party	2,11,580	4,22,975
Maharashtra	44	Satara	GEN	Laxmanrao Pandurang Jadhav (Patil)	Nationalist Congress Party	2,81,577	Hindurao Naik Nimbalkar	Shiv Sena	2,77,620	3,957
Maharashtra	45	Karad	GEN	Shriniwas Patil	Nationalist Congress Party	4,36,732	Mankumare Vasant Dnyandev	Shiv Sena	2,40,002	1,96,730
Maharashtra	46	Sangli	GEN	Prakashbapu Vasantdada Patil	Indian National Congress	3,05,048	Deepak Mhaisalkar	Bharatiya Janata Party	2,23,425	81,623
Maharashtra	47	Ichalkaranji	GEN	Nivedita Mane	Nationalist Congress Party	4,22,272	Sanjay Shamrao Patil	Shiv Sena	3,21,223	101,049
Maharashtra	48	Kolhapur	GEN	Sadashivrao Mandlik	Nationalist Congress Party	4,01,922	Dhananjay Mahadik	Shiv Sena	3,87,169	14,753
Manipur	1	Inner Manipur	GEN	Thokchom Meinya	Indian National Congress	1,54,055	Moirangthem Nara	Communist Party of India	1,04,722	49,333
Manipur	2	Outer Manipur	(ST)	Mani Charenamei	Independent	2,29,634	D. Loli Adanee	Bharatiya Janata Party	1,47,441	82,193
Meghalaya	1	Shillong	GEN	Paty Ripple Kyndiah	Indian National Congress	1,90,058	S. Loniak Marbaniang	Independent	1,19,162	70,896
Meghalaya	2	Tura	GEN	Purno Agitok Sangma	All India Trinamool Congress	1,91,938	Mukul Sangma	Indian National Congress	1,19,175	72,763
Mizoram	1	Mizoram	(ST)	Vanlalzawma	Mizo National Front	1,82,864	Laltluangliana Khiangte	Independent	1,59,170	23,694
Nagaland	1	Nagaland	GEN	W. Wangyuh	Naga People's Front	6,98,128	K. Asungba Sangtam	Indian National Congress	2,46,109	4,52,019
Odisha	1	Mayurbhanj	(ST)	Sudam Marndi	Jharkhand Mukti Morcha	2,60,529	Bhagirathi Majhi	Bharatiya Janata Party	2,52,557	7,972
Odisha	2	Balasore	GEN	Kharabela Swain	Bharatiya Janata Party	5,53,087	Niranjan Panda	Indian National Congress	3,16,132	2,36,955
Odisha	3	Bhadrak	(SC)	Arjun Charan Sethi	Biju Janata Dal	4,89,200	Muralidhar Jena	Indian National Congress	3,94,431	94,769
Odisha	4	Jajpur	(SC)	Mohan Jena	Biju Janata Dal	4,52,177	Amiya Kanta Mallik	Indian National Congress	4,00,711	51,466
Odisha	5	Kendrapara	GEN	Archana Nayak	Biju Janata Dal	4,53,276	Srikant Kumar Jena	Indian National Congress	3,66,433	86,843
Odisha	6	Cuttack	GEN	Bhartruhari Mahtab	Biju Janata Dal	4,96,750	Jayanti Patnaik	Indian National Congress	3,23,552	1,73,198
Odisha	7	Jagatsinghpur	GEN	Brahmananda Panda	Biju Janata Dal	4,66,383	Ranjib Biswal	Indian National Congress	4,09,121	57,262
Odisha	8	Puri	GEN	Braja Kishore Tripathy	Biju Janata Dal	4,62,248	Pinaki Misra	Indian National Congress	4,01,288	60,960
Odisha	9	Bhubaneswar	GEN	Prasanna Kumar Patasani	Biju Janata Dal	4,37,762	Soumya Ranjan Patnaik	Indian National Congress	3,25,483	1,12,279
Odisha	10	Aska	GEN	Hari Har Swain	Biju Janata Dal	3,81,526	Ramkrushana Patnaik	Indian National Congress	2,48,924	1,32,602
Odisha	11	Berhampur	GEN	Chandra Sekhar Sahu	Indian National Congress	3,55,973	Anadi Charan Sahu	Bharatiya Janata Party	3,04,316	51,657
Odisha	12	Koraput	(ST)	Giridhar Gamang	Indian National Congress	3,34,748	Papanna Mutika	Biju Janata Dal	2,91,481	43,267
Odisha	13	Nowrangpur	(ST)	Parsuram Majhi	Bharatiya Janata Party	3,59,989	Chandra Sekhar Majhi	Indian National Congress	3,22,957	37,032
Odisha	14	Kalahandi	GEN	Bikram Keshari Deo	Bharatiya Janata Party	3,57,079	Bhakta Charan Das	Indian National Congress	3,22,957	34,122
Odisha	15	Phulbani	(SC)	Sugrib Singh	Biju Janata Dal	3,37,951	Abhimanyu Behera	Indian National Congress	3,18,679	19,272
Odisha	16	Bolangir	GEN	Sangeeta Kumari Singh Deo	Bharatiya Janata Party	3,22,912	Sarat Pattanayak	Indian National Congress	2,22,230	1,00,682
Odisha	17	Sambalpur	GEN	Prasanna Acharya	Biju Janata Dal	3,90,556	Sanjay Bhoi	Indian National Congress	3,75,786	14,770
Odisha	18	Deogarh	GEN	Dharmendra Pradhan	Bharatiya Janata Party	4,26,092	Sriballav Panigrahi	Indian National Congress	3,46,996	79,096
Odisha	19	Dhenkanal	GEN	Tathagata Satpathy	Biju Janata Dal	4,23,539	Kamakhya Prasad Singh Deo	Indian National Congress	3,00,657	1,22,882
Odisha	20	Sundargarh	(ST)	Jual Oram	Bharatiya Janata Party	3,36,562	Frida Topno	Indian National Congress	2,96,886	39,676
Odisha	21	Keonjhar	(ST)	Ananta Nayak	Bharatiya Janata Party	3,55,702	Nilakantha Nayak	Indian National Congress	3,06,493	49,209
Puducherry	1	Puducherry	GEN	M. Ramadass	Pattali Makkal Katchi	2,41,653	Lalitha Kumaramangalam	Bharatiya Janata Party	1,72,472	69,181
Punjab	1	Gurdaspur	GEN	Vinod Khanna	Bharatiya Janata Party	3,87,612	Sukhbans Kaur Bhinder	Indian National Congress	3,62,629	24,983
Punjab	2	Amritsar	GEN	Navjot Singh Sidhu	Bharatiya Janata Party	3,94,223	Raghunandan Lal Bhatia	Indian National Congress	2,84,691	1,09,532
Punjab	3	Tarn Taran	GEN	Rattan Singh Ajnala	Shiromani Akali Dal	3,64,646	Sukhbinder Singh	Indian National Congress	3,08,252	56,394
Punjab	4	Jullundur	GEN	Rana Gurjeet Singh	Indian National Congress	3,44,619	Naresh Gujral	Shiromani Akali Dal	3,11,156	33,463
Punjab	5	Phillaur	(SC)	Charanjit Singh Atwal	Shiromani Akali Dal	3,24,512	Santosh Chowdhary	Indian National Congress	2,25,628	98,884
Punjab	6	Hoshiarpur	GEN	Avinash Rai Khanna	Bharatiya Janata Party	2,89,815	Darshan Singh Mattu	Communist Party of India (Marxist)	1,85,444	1,04,371
Punjab	7	Ropar	(SC)	Sukhdev Singh Libra	Shiromani Akali Dal	3,47,631	Shamsher Singh Dullo	Indian National Congress	3,13,994	33,637
Punjab	8	Patiala	GEN	Preneet Kaur	Indian National Congress	4,09,917	Kanwaljit Singh	Shiromani Akali Dal	3,86,250	23,667
Punjab	9	Ludhiana	GEN	Sharanjit Singh Dhillon	Shiromani Akali Dal	3,29,234	Manish Tewari	Indian National Congress	2,99,694	29,540
Punjab	10	Sangrur	GEN	Sukhdev Singh Dhindsa	Shiromani Akali Dal	2,86,828	Arvind Khanna	Indian National Congress	2,59,551	27,277
Punjab	11	Bhatinda	(SC)	Paramjit Kaur Gulshan	Shiromani Akali Dal	3,23,394	Kaushalya Chaman Bhaura	Communist Party of India	2,60,752	62,642
Punjab	12	Faridkot	GEN	Sukhbir Singh Badal	Shiromani Akali Dal	4,75,928	Karan Kaur Brar	Indian National Congress	3,40,649	1,35,279
Punjab	13	Ferozepur	GEN	Zora Singh Maan	Shiromani Akali Dal	3,57,102	Jagmeet Singh Brar	Indian National Congress	3,45,563	11,539
Rajasthan	1	Ganganagar	(SC)	Nihalchand Meghwal	Bharatiya Janata Party	3,31,475	Bharat Ram Meghwal	Indian National Congress	3,24,082	7,393
Rajasthan	2	Bikaner	GEN	Dharmendra	Bharatiya Janata Party	5,17,802	Rameshwar Lal Dudi	Indian National Congress	4,60,627	57,175
Rajasthan	3	Churu	GEN	Ram Singh Kaswan	Bharatiya Janata Party	4,00,718	Balram Jakhar	Indian National Congress	3,70,864	29,854
Rajasthan	4	Jhunjhunu	GEN	Sis Ram Ola	Indian National Congress	2,74,168	Santosh Ahlawat	Bharatiya Janata Party	2,50,813	23,355
Rajasthan	5	Sikar	GEN	Subhash Maharia	Bharatiya Janata Party	3,67,546	Narayan Singh	Indian National Congress	3,12,863	54,683
Rajasthan	6	Jaipur	GEN	Girdhari Lal Bhargava	Bharatiya Janata Party	4,80,730	Pratap Singh Khachariyawas	Indian National Congress	3,73,544	1,07,186
Rajasthan	7	Dausa	GEN	Sachin Pilot	Indian National Congress	3,69,935	Kartar Singh Bhadana	Bharatiya Janata Party	2,55,070	1,14,865
Rajasthan	8	Alwar	GEN	Karan Singh Yadav	Indian National Congress	2,46,833	Mahant Chandnath	Bharatiya Janata Party	2,38,462	8,371
Rajasthan	9	Bharatpur	GEN	Vishvendra Singh	Bharatiya Janata Party	3,19,904	Ved Prakash	Indian National Congress	2,08,555	1,11,349
Rajasthan	10	Bayana	(SC)	Ramswaroop Koli	Bharatiya Janata Party	2,65,051	Mahendra Singh	Indian National Congress	2,05,427	59,624
Rajasthan	11	Sawai Madhopur	(ST)	Namo Narain Meena	Indian National Congress	3,67,553	Jaskaur Meena	Bharatiya Janata Party	2,56,390	1,11,163
Rajasthan	12	Ajmer	GEN	Rasa Singh Rawat	Bharatiya Janata Party	3,14,788	Haji Habibur Rehman	Indian National Congress	1,86,812	1,27,976
Rajasthan	13	Tonk	(SC)	Kailash Meghwal	Bharatiya Janata Party	3,15,717	Nand Kishore Bairwa	Indian National Congress	2,57,205	58,512
Rajasthan	14	Kota	GEN	Raghuveer Singh Koshal	Bharatiya Janata Party	2,98,314	Hari Mohan Sharma	Indian National Congress	2,26,536	71,778
Rajasthan	15	Jhalawar	GEN	Dushyant Singh	Bharatiya Janata Party	3,03,845	Sanjay Gurjar	Indian National Congress	2,22,266	81,579
Rajasthan	16	Banswara	(ST)	Dhan Singh Rawat	Bharatiya Janata Party	2,69,239	Prabhulal Rawat	Indian National Congress	2,47,556	21,683
Rajasthan	17	Salumber	(ST)	Mahaveer Bhagora	Bharatiya Janata Party	2,81,659	Bheru Lal Meena	Indian National Congress	2,56,885	24,774
Rajasthan	18	Udaipur	GEN	Kiran Maheshwari	Bharatiya Janata Party	3,98,059	Girija Vyas	Indian National Congress	3,23,184	74,875
Rajasthan	19	Chittorgarh	GEN	Shrichand Kriplani	Bharatiya Janata Party	3,75,385	Vishwa Vijay Singh	Indian National Congress	2,39,615	1,35,770
Rajasthan	20	Bhilwara	GEN	V. P. Singh Badnore	Bharatiya Janata Party	3,17,292	Kailash Vyas	Indian National Congress	2,56,640	60,652
Rajasthan	21	Pali	GEN	Pusp Jain	Bharatiya Janata Party	2,64,114	Surendra Kumar Surana	Indian National Congress	2,00,876	63,238
Rajasthan	22	Jalore	(SC)	Bangaru Susheela	Bharatiya Janata Party	3,21,255	Buta Singh	Indian National Congress	2,82,063	39,192
Rajasthan	23	Barmer	GEN	Manvendra Singh	Bharatiya Janata Party	6,31,851	Sonaram Choudhary	Indian National Congress	3,59,963	2,71,888
Rajasthan	24	Jodhpur	GEN	Jaswant Singh Bishnoi	Bharatiya Janata Party	4,34,352	Badri Ram Jakhar	Indian National Congress	3,91,857	42,495
Rajasthan	25	Nagaur	GEN	Bhanwar Singh Dangawas	Bharatiya Janata Party	2,84,657	Ram Raghunath Choudhary	Indian National Congress	2,14,030	70,627
Sikkim	1	Sikkim	GEN	Nakul Das Rai	Sikkim Democratic Front	1,53,409	Biraj Adhikari	Indian National Congress	60,258	93,151
Tamil Nadu	1	Madras North	GEN	C. Kuppusami	Dravida Munnetra Kazhagam	5,70,122	Sukumar Nambiar. M N	Bharatiya Janata Party	3,16,583	2,53,539
Tamil Nadu	2	Madras Central	GEN	Dayanidhi Maran	Dravida Munnetra Kazhagam	3,16,329	Balaganga N	All India Anna Dravida Munnetra Kazhagam	1,82,151	1,34,178
Tamil Nadu	3	Madras South	GEN	T. R. Baalu	Dravida Munnetra Kazhagam	5,64,578	Bader Sayeed	All India Anna Dravida Munnetra Kazhagam	3,43,838	2,20,740
Tamil Nadu	4	Sriperumbudur	(SC)	A. Krishnaswamy	Dravida Munnetra Kazhagam	5,17,617	P. Venugopal	All India Anna Dravida Munnetra Kazhagam	2,82,271	2,35,346
Tamil Nadu	5	Chengalpattu	GEN	A. K. Moorthy	Pattali Makkal Katchi	4,31,643	K.N. Ramachandra	All India Anna Dravida Munnetra Kazhagam	2,82,919	1,48,724
Tamil Nadu	6	Arakkonam	GEN	R. Velu	Pattali Makkal Katchi	3,86,911	Shanmugam N.	All India Anna Dravida Munnetra Kazhagam	2,84,715	1,02,196
Tamil Nadu	7	Vellore	GEN	K. M. Kader Mohideen	Dravida Munnetra Kazhagam	4,36,642	Santhanam. A	All India Anna Dravida Munnetra Kazhagam	2,58,032	1,78,610
Tamil Nadu	8	Tirupattur	GEN	D. Venugopal	Dravida Munnetra Kazhagam	4,53,786	Subramani. K. G	All India Anna Dravida Munnetra Kazhagam	2,72,884	1,80,902
Tamil Nadu	9	Vandavasi	GEN	Gingee N. Ramachandran	Marumalarchi Dravida Munnetra Kazhagam	3,94,903	R Rajalakshmi	All India Anna Dravida Munnetra Kazhagam	2,43,470	1,51,433
Tamil Nadu	10	Tindivanam	GEN	K. Dhanaraju	Pattali Makkal Katchi	3,67,849	Arunmozhithevan. A	All India Anna Dravida Munnetra Kazhagam	2,76,685	91,164
Tamil Nadu	11	Cuddalore	GEN	K. Venkatapathy	Dravida Munnetra Kazhagam	4,00,059	Rajendran. R	All India Anna Dravida Munnetra Kazhagam	2,68,707	1,31,352
Tamil Nadu	12	Chidambaram	(SC)	E. Ponnuswamy	Pattali Makkal Katchi	3,43,424	Thol. Thirumavalavan	Janata Dal (United)	2,55,773	87,651
Tamil Nadu	13	Dharmapuri	GEN	R. Senthil	Pattali Makkal Katchi	3,97,540	P. D. Elangovan	Bharatiya Janata Party	1,81,450	2,16,090
Tamil Nadu	14	Krishnagiri	GEN	E. G. Sugavanam	Dravida Munnetra Kazhagam	4,03,297	Nanje Gowdu. K	All India Anna Dravida Munnetra Kazhagam	2,84,075	1,19,222
Tamil Nadu	15	Rasipuram	(SC)	K. Rani	Indian National Congress	3,84,170	Anbalagan. S	All India Anna Dravida Munnetra Kazhagam	2,49,637	1,34,533
Tamil Nadu	16	Salem	GEN	K. V. Thangkabalu	Indian National Congress	4,44,591	Rajasekaran. A	All India Anna Dravida Munnetra Kazhagam	2,68,964	1,75,627
Tamil Nadu	17	Tiruchengode	GEN	Subbulakshmi Jagadeesan	Dravida Munnetra Kazhagam	5,01,569	Edappadi K. Palaniswami	All India Anna Dravida Munnetra Kazhagam	3,22,172	1,79,397
Tamil Nadu	18	Nilgiris	GEN	R. Prabhu	Indian National Congress	4,94,121	M Master Mathan	Bharatiya Janata Party	2,57,619	2,36,502
Tamil Nadu	19	Gobichettipalayam	GEN	E. V. K. S. Elangovan	Indian National Congress	4,26,826	N. R Govindarajar	All India Anna Dravida Munnetra Kazhagam	2,12,349	2,14,477
Tamil Nadu	20	Coimbatore	GEN	K. Subbarayan	Communist Party of India	5,04,981	C. P. Radhakrishnan	Bharatiya Janata Party	3,40,476	1,64,505
Tamil Nadu	21	Pollachi	(SC)	C. Krishnan	Marumalarchi Dravida Munnetra Kazhagam	3,64,988	Murugan. G	All India Anna Dravida Munnetra Kazhagam	2,44,067	1,20,921
Tamil Nadu	22	Palani	GEN	S. K. Kharventhan	Indian National Congress	4,48,900	Kishore Kumar. K	All India Anna Dravida Munnetra Kazhagam	2,17,407	2,31,493
Tamil Nadu	23	Dindigul	GEN	N. S. V. Chitthan	Indian National Congress	4,07,116	Jeyaraman. M	All India Anna Dravida Munnetra Kazhagam	2,51,945	1,55,171
Tamil Nadu	24	Madurai	GEN	P. Mohan	Communist Party of India (Marxist)	4,14,433	A. K. Bose	All India Anna Dravida Munnetra Kazhagam	2,81,593	1,32,840
Tamil Nadu	25	Periyakulam	GEN	J. M. Aaroon Rashid	Indian National Congress	3,46,851	T. T. V. Dhinakaran	All India Anna Dravida Munnetra Kazhagam	3,25,696	21,155
Tamil Nadu	26	Karur	GEN	K. C. Palanisamy	Dravida Munnetra Kazhagam	4,50,407	Palanichamy Raja. N	All India Anna Dravida Munnetra Kazhagam	2,59,531	1,90,876
Tamil Nadu	27	Tiruchirappalli	GEN	L. Ganesan	Marumalarchi Dravida Munnetra Kazhagam	4,50,907	M. Paranjothi	All India Anna Dravida Munnetra Kazhagam	2,34,182	2,16,725
Tamil Nadu	28	Perambalur	(SC)	A. Raja	Dravida Munnetra Kazhagam	3,89,708	M. Sundaram	All India Anna Dravida Munnetra Kazhagam	2,36,375	1,53,333
Tamil Nadu	29	Mayiladuthurai	GEN	Mani Shankar Aiyar	Indian National Congress	4,11,160	O. S. Manian	All India Anna Dravida Munnetra Kazhagam	2,15,469	1,95,691
Tamil Nadu	30	Nagapattinam	(SC)	A. K. S. Vijayan	Dravida Munnetra Kazhagam	4,63,389	Archunan. P J	All India Anna Dravida Munnetra Kazhagam	2,47,166	2,16,223
Tamil Nadu	31	Thanjavur	GEN	S. S. Palanimanickam	Dravida Munnetra Kazhagam	4,00,986	Thangamuthu. K	All India Anna Dravida Munnetra Kazhagam	2,81,838	1,19,148
Tamil Nadu	32	Pudukkottai	GEN	S. Regupathy	Dravida Munnetra Kazhagam	4,66,133	Ravichandran. A	All India Anna Dravida Munnetra Kazhagam	3,09,637	1,56,496
Tamil Nadu	33	Sivaganga	GEN	P. Chidambaram	Indian National Congress	4,00,393	Karuppiah. S P	All India Anna Dravida Munnetra Kazhagam	2,37,668	1,62,725
Tamil Nadu	34	Ramanathapuram	GEN	M. S. K. Bhavani Rajenthiran	Dravida Munnetra Kazhagam	3,35,287	Murugesan. C	All India Anna Dravida Munnetra Kazhagam	2,25,337	1,09,950
Tamil Nadu	35	Sivakasi	GEN	A. Ravichandran	Marumalarchi Dravida Munnetra Kazhagam	4,69,072	Kannan. P	All India Anna Dravida Munnetra Kazhagam	3,04,555	1,64,517
Tamil Nadu	36	Tirunelveli	GEN	R. Dhanuskodi Athithan	Indian National Congress	3,70,127	Amirtha Ganesan R	All India Anna Dravida Munnetra Kazhagam	2,03,052	1,67,075
Tamil Nadu	37	Tenkasi	(SC)	M. Appadurai	Communist Party of India	3,48,000	S. Murugesan	All India Anna Dravida Munnetra Kazhagam	2,25,824	1,22,176
Tamil Nadu	38	Tiruchendur	GEN	V. Radhika Selvi	Dravida Munnetra Kazhagam	3,94,484	Thamodaran. T	All India Anna Dravida Munnetra Kazhagam	2,12,803	1,81,681
Tamil Nadu	39	Nagercoil	GEN	A. V. Bellarmin	Communist Party of India (Marxist)	4,10,091	Pon Radhakrishnan	Bharatiya Janata Party	2,45,797	1,64,294
Tripura	1	Tripura West	GEN	Khagen Das	Communist Party of India (Marxist)	4,96,843	Nirmala Dasgupta	Indian National Congress	1,12,207	3,84,636
Tripura	2	Tripura East	(ST)	Baju Ban Riyan	Communist Party of India (Marxist)	4,14,230	Pulin Bihari Dewan	Bharatiya Janata Party	1,03,494	3,10,736
Uttar Pradesh	1	Bijnor	(SC)	Munshiram Singh	Rashtriya Lok Dal	3,01,599	Ghan Shyam Chandr Kharwar	Bahujan Samaj Party	2,21,424	80,175
Uttar Pradesh	2	Amroha	GEN	Harish Nagpal	Independent	2,87,522	Mahmood Madani	Rashtriya Lok Dal	2,69,638	17,884
Uttar Pradesh	3	Moradabad	Gen	Shafiqur Rahman Barq	Samajwadi Party	2,18,079	Chandra Vijay Singh	Bharatiya Janata Party	1,82,239	35,840
Uttar Pradesh	4	Rampur	Gen	Jaya Prada	Samajwadi Party	2,89,390	Begum Noor Bano	Indian National Congress	2,039,16	85,474
Uttar Pradesh	5	Sambhal	Gen	Ram Gopal Yadav	Samajwadi Party	3,57,049	Tarannum Aqeel	Bahujan Samaj Party	1,58,988	1,98,061
Uttar Pradesh	6	Budaun	Gen	Saleem Iqbal Shervani	Samajwadi Party	2,65,713	Brijpal Singh Shakya	Bharatiya Janata Party	2,14,391	51,322
Uttar Pradesh	7	Aonla	Gen	Kunwar Sarvraj Singh	Janata Dal (United)	1,53,322	Raj Veer Singh	Samajwadi Party	1,46,451	6,871
Uttar Pradesh	8	Bareilly	Gen	Santosh Gangwar	Bharatiya Janata Party	2,69,651	Akbar Ahmad Dumpy	Bahujan Samaj Party	2,10,007	59,644
Uttar Pradesh	9	Pilibhit	Gen	Maneka Gandhi	Bharatiya Janata Party	2,55,615	Satyapal Gangwar	Samajwadi Party	1,52,895	1,02,720
Uttar Pradesh	10	Shahjahanpur	Gen	Jitin Prasada	Indian National Congress	2,20,763	Rammurti Singh Verma	Samajwadi Party	1,38,931	81,832
Uttar Pradesh	11	Kheri	Gen	Ravi Prakash Verma	Samajwadi Party	2,24,602	Daud Ahmad	Bahujan Samaj Party	2,12,842	11,760
Uttar Pradesh	12	Shahabad	Gen	Iliyas Azmi	Samajwadi Party	2,10,171	Satya Dev Singh	Bharatiya Janata Party	1,63,802	46,369
Uttar Pradesh	13	Sitapur	Gen	Rajesh Verma	Bahujan Samaj Party	1,71,733	Mukhtar Anees	Samajwadi Party	1,66,499	5,234
Uttar Pradesh	14	Misrikh	(SC)	Ashok Kumar Rawat	Bahujan Samaj Party	2,07,062	Sushila Saroj	Samajwadi Party	1,87,659	19,403
Uttar Pradesh	15	Hardoi	(SC)	Usha Verma	Samajwadi Party	2,03,445	Shiv Prasad Verma	Bahujan Samaj Party	1,64,242	39,203
Uttar Pradesh	16	Lucknow	Gen	Atal Bihari Vajpayee	Bharatiya Janata Party	3,24,714	Madhu Gupta	Samajwadi Party	1,06,339	2,18,375
Uttar Pradesh	17	Mohanlalganj	(SC)	Jai Prakash	Samajwadi Party	1,48,578	Radhe Lal	Bahujan Samaj Party	1,46,010	2,568
Uttar Pradesh	18	Unnao	GEN	Brajesh Pathak	Bahujan Samaj Party	1,78,366	Deepak Kumar	Samajwadi Party	1,60,605	17,761
Uttar Pradesh	19	Raebareli	GEN	Sonia Gandhi	Indian National Congress	3,78,107	Ashok Kumar Singh	Samajwadi Party	1,28,342	2,49,765
Uttar Pradesh	20	Pratapgarh	GEN	Akshay Pratap Singh	Samajwadi Party	2,38,137	Rajkumari Ratna Singh	Indian National Congress	1,68,865	69,272
Uttar Pradesh	21	Amethi	GEN	Rahul Gandhi	Indian National Congress	3,90,179	Chandra Parkash Mishra	Bahujan Samaj Party	99,326	2,90,853
Uttar Pradesh	22	Sultanpur	GEN	Mohammad Tahir Khan	Bahujan Samaj Party	2,61,564	Shailendra Pratap Singh	Samajwadi Party	1,59,754	1,01,810
Uttar Pradesh	23	Akbarpur	(SC)	Mayawati	Bahujan Samaj Party	3,25,019	Shankh Lal Manjhi	Samajwadi Party	2,66,750	58,269
Uttar Pradesh	24	Faizabad	GEN	Mitrasen Yadav	Bahujan Samaj Party	2,07,285	Lallu Singh	Bharatiya Janata Party	1,73,799	33,486
Uttar Pradesh	25	Bara Banki	(SC)	Kamla Prasad	Bahujan Samaj Party	1,96,370	Ram Sagar Rawat	Samajwadi Party	1,75,448	20,922
Uttar Pradesh	26	Kaiserganj	GEN	Beni Prasad Verma	Samajwadi Party	2,19,920	Arif Mohammad Khan	Bharatiya Janata Party	2,07,260	12,660
Uttar Pradesh	27	Bahraich	GEN	Rubab Sayda	Samajwadi Party	1,88,949	Bhagat Ram Mishra	Bahujan Samaj Party	1,62,615	26,334
Uttar Pradesh	28	Balrampur	GEN	Brij Bhushan Sharan Singh	Bharatiya Janata Party	2,70,941	Rizwan Zaheer	Bahujan Samaj Party	2,18,328	52,613
Uttar Pradesh	29	Gonda	GEN	Kirti Vardhan Singh	Samajwadi Party	2,51,947	Ghan Shyam Shukla	Bharatiya Janata Party	2,14,949	36,998
Uttar Pradesh	30	Basti	(SC)	Lal Mani Prasad	Bahujan Samaj Party	1,55,223	Sriram Chauhan	Bharatiya Janata Party	1,29,849	25,374
Uttar Pradesh	31	Domariaganj	GEN	Mohammed Muqueem	Bahujan Samaj Party	2,02,544	Jagdambika Pal	Indian National Congress	1,49,642	52,902
Uttar Pradesh	32	Khalilabad	GEN	Bhalchandra Yadava	Bahujan Samaj Party	2,34,712	Bhishma Shankar Tiwari	Samajwadi Party	2,07,689	27,023
Uttar Pradesh	33	Bansgaon	(SC)	Mahaveer Prasad	Indian National Congress	1,80,388	Sadal Prasad	Bahujan Samaj Party	1,63,947	16,441
Uttar Pradesh	34	Gorakhpur	GEN	Yogi Adityanath	Bharatiya Janata Party	3,53,647	Jamuna Prasad Nishad	Samajwadi Party	2,11,608	1,42,039
Uttar Pradesh	35	Maharajganj	GEN	Pankaj Choudhary	Bharatiya Janata Party	2,28,702	Akhilesh Singh	Samajwadi Party	1,63,903	64,799
Uttar Pradesh	36	Padrauna	GEN	Baleshwar Yadav	National Loktantrik Party	2,06,850	R. P. N. Singh	Indian National Congress	1,98,428	8,422
Uttar Pradesh	37	Deoria	GEN	Mohan Singh	Samajwadi Party	2,37,664	Prakash Mani Tripathi	Bharatiya Janata Party	1,85,438	52,226
Uttar Pradesh	38	Salempur	GEN	Harikeval Prasad	Samajwadi Party	1,95,570	Bhola Pandey	Indian National Congress	1,79,317	16,253
Uttar Pradesh	39	Ballia	GEN	Chandra Shekhar	Samajwadi Janata Party (Rashtriya)	2,70,136	Kapildeo Yadav	Bahujan Samaj Party	1,89,082	81,054
Uttar Pradesh	40	Ghosi	GEN	Chandradeo Prasad Rajbhar	Samajwadi Party	2,01,468	Bal Krishna	Bahujan Samaj Party	1,80,456	21,012
Uttar Pradesh	41	Azamgarh	GEN	Ramakant Yadav	Bahujan Samaj Party	2,58,216	Durga Prasad Yadav	Samajwadi Party	2,51,248	6,968
Uttar Pradesh	42	Lalganj	(SC)	Daroga Prasad Saroj	Samajwadi Party	2,83,473	Bali Ram	Bahujan Samaj Party	2,40,742	42,731
Uttar Pradesh	43	Machhlishahr	GEN	Umakant Yadav	Bahujan Samaj Party	2,37,438	Chandra Nath Singh	Samajwadi Party	1,82,056	55,382
Uttar Pradesh	44	Jaunpur	GEN	Parasnath Yadav	Samajwadi Party	2,19,614	Om Prakash Dubey	Bahujan Samaj Party	1,92,489	27,125
Uttar Pradesh	45	Saidpur	(SC)	Tufani Saroj	Samajwadi Party	2,31,989	R A Prasad	Bahujan Samaj Party	2,02,179	29,810
Uttar Pradesh	46	Ghazipur	GEN	Afzal Ansari	Samajwadi Party	4,15,687	Manoj Sinha	Bharatiya Janata Party	1,88,910	2,26,777
Uttar Pradesh	47	Chandauli	GEN	Kailash Nath Singh Yadav	Bahujan Samaj Party	2,04,625	Ananda Ratna Maurya	Samajwadi Party	2,02,956	1,669
Uttar Pradesh	48	Varanasi	GEN	Rajesh Kumar Mishra	Indian National Congress	2,06,904	Shankar Prasad Jaiswal	Bharatiya Janata Party	1,49,468	57,436
Uttar Pradesh	49	Robertsganj	(SC)	Lal Chandra Kol	Bahujan Samaj Party	1,89,521	Pakaudi Lal Kol	Samajwadi Party	1,79,159	10,362
Uttar Pradesh	50	Mirzapur	GEN	Narendra Kumar Kushwaha	Bahujan Samaj Party	2,01,942	Virendra Singh	Bharatiya Janata Party	1,65,530	36,412
Uttar Pradesh	51	Phulpur	GEN	Atique Ahmed	Samajwadi Party	2,65,432	Keshari Devi Patel	Bahujan Samaj Party	2,01,085	64,347
Uttar Pradesh	52	Allahabad	GEN	Rewati Raman Singh	Samajwadi Party	2,34,008	Murli Manohar Joshi	Bharatiya Janata Party	2,05,625	28,383
Uttar Pradesh	53	Chail	(SC)	Shailendra Kumar	Samajwadi Party	1,96,206	Vachaspati	Bahujan Samaj Party	1,95,576	630
Uttar Pradesh	54	Fatehpur	GEN	Mahendra Prasad Nishad	Bahujan Samaj Party	1,63,568	Achal Singh	Samajwadi Party	1,11,000	52,568
Uttar Pradesh	55	Banda	GEN	Shyama Charan Gupta	Samajwadi Party	1,85,099	Ram Sajeevan	Bahujan Samaj Party	1,28,795	56,304
Uttar Pradesh	56	Hamirpur	GEN	Rajnarayan Budholiya	Samajwadi Party	2,20,917	Ashok Kumar Singh Chandel	Bahujan Samaj Party	1,83,763	37,154
Uttar Pradesh	57	Jhansi	GEN	Chandrapal Singh Yadav	Samajwadi Party	2,38,782	Babu Lal Kushwaha	Bahujan Samaj Party	2,12,483	26,299
Uttar Pradesh	58	Jalaun	(SC)	Bhanu Pratap Singh Verma	Bharatiya Janata Party	1,95,228	Ghanshyam Anuragi	Samajwadi Party	1,68,437	26,791
Uttar Pradesh	59	Ghatampur	(SC)	Radhey Shyam Kori	Samajwadi Party	1,60,117	Pyare Lal Sankhwar	Bahujan Samaj Party	1,49,805	10,312
Uttar Pradesh	60	Bilhaur	GEN	Raja Ram Pal	Bahujan Samaj Party	2,23,195	Lal Singh Tomar	Samajwadi Party	1,98,793	24,412
Uttar Pradesh	61	Kanpur	GEN	Sriprakash Jaiswal	Indian National Congress	2,11,109	Satyadev Pachauri	Bharatiya Janata Party	1,98,793	12,316
Uttar Pradesh	62	Etawah	GEN	Raghuraj Singh Shakya	Samajwadi Party	3,67,807	Sarita Bhadauria	Bharatiya Janata Party	1,77,650	1,90,157
Uttar Pradesh	63	Kannauj	GEN	Akhilesh Yadav	Samajwadi Party	4,64,367	Thakur Rajesh Singh	Bahujan Samaj Party	1,56,994	3,07,373
Uttar Pradesh	64	Farrukhabad	GEN	Chandra Bhushan Singh	Samajwadi Party	1,76,129	Louise Khurshid	Indian National Congress	1,73,384	2,745
Uttar Pradesh	65	Mainpuri	GEN	Mulayam Singh Yadav	Samajwadi Party	4,60,470	Ashok Shakya	Bahujan Samaj Party	1,22,600	3,37,870
Uttar Pradesh	66	Jalesar	GEN	S. P. Singh Baghel	Samajwadi Party	2,87,091	Pratyendra Pal Singh	Bharatiya Janata Party	1,81,023	1,06,068
Uttar Pradesh	67	Etah	GEN	Devendra Singh Yadav	Samajwadi Party	2,76,156	Ashok Ratan Shakya	Bharatiya Janata Party	2,24,821	51,335
Uttar Pradesh	68	Firozabad	(SC)	Ram Ji Lal Suman	Samajwadi Party	2,12,383	Kishori Lal Mahaur	Bharatiya Janata Party	1,57,595	54,788
Uttar Pradesh	69	Agra	GEN	Raj Babbar	Samajwadi Party	2,43,094	Murari Lal Mittal	Bharatiya Janata Party	1,85,752	57,342
Uttar Pradesh	70	Mathura	GEN	Manvendra Singh	Indian National Congress	1,87,400	Chaudhary Laxmi Narayan Singh	Bahujan Samaj Party	1,49,268	38,132
Uttar Pradesh	71	Hathras	(SC)	Kishan Lal Diler	Bharatiya Janata Party	1,75,049	Ram Vir Singh Bhaiyaji	Bahujan Samaj Party	1,52,212	22,837
Uttar Pradesh	72	Aligarh	GEN	Bijendra Singh	Indian National Congress	1,67,142	Sheela Gautam	Bharatiya Janata Party	1,64,351	2,791
Uttar Pradesh	73	Khurja	(SC)	Ashok Kumar Pradhan	Bharatiya Janata Party	2,14,701	Ravi Gautam	Bahujan Samaj Party	1,73,551	41,150
Uttar Pradesh	74	Bulandshahr	GEN	Kalyan Singh	Bharatiya Janata Party	2,58,284	Badrul Islam	Rashtriya Lok Dal	2,41,633	16,651
Uttar Pradesh	75	Hapur	GEN	Surendra Prakash Goel	Indian National Congress	2,35,114	Ramesh Chand Tomar	Bharatiya Janata Party	1,92,751	42,363
Uttar Pradesh	76	Meerut	GEN	Mohammed Shahid Akhlaq	Bahujan Samaj Party	2,52,518	Malook Nagar	Rashtriya Lok Dal	1,83,182	69,336
Uttar Pradesh	77	Baghpat	GEN	Ajit Singh	Rashtriya Lok Dal	3,53,181	Aulad Ali	Bahujan Samaj Party	1,32,543	2,20,638
Uttar Pradesh	78	Muzaffarnagar	GEN	Chaudhary Munawwar Hasan	Samajwadi Party	3,06,225	Amar Pal Singh	Bharatiya Janata Party	2,37,220	69,005
Uttar Pradesh	79	Kairana	GEN	Anuradha Choudhary	Rashtriya Lok Dal	5,23,923	Shahnawaz	Bahujan Samaj Party	1,81,509	3,42,414
Uttar Pradesh	80	Saharanpur	GEN	Rasheed Masood	Samajwadi Party	3,53,272	Mansoor Ali Khan	Bahujan Samaj Party	3,26,444	26,828
Uttarakhand	1	Tehri Garhwal	GEN	Manabendra Shah	Bharatiya Janata Party	2,67,395	Vijay Bahuguna	Indian National Congress	2,49,949	17,446
Uttarakhand	2	Garhwal	GEN	B. C. Khanduri	Bharatiya Janata Party	2,57,726	Tejpal Singh Rawat	Indian National Congress	2,06,764	50,962
Uttarakhand	3	Almora	GEN	Bachi Singh Rawat	Bharatiya Janata Party	2,25,742	Renuka Rawat	Indian National Congress	2,15,690	10,052
Uttarakhand	4	Nainital	GEN	K. C. Singh Baba	Indian National Congress	2,75,658	Vijay Bansal	Bharatiya Janata Party	2,26,474	49,184
Uttarakhand	5	Haridwar	(SC)	Rajendra Kumar Badi	Samajwadi Party	1,57,331	Bhagwan Das	Bahujan Samaj Party	1,19,672	37,659
West Bengal	1	Cooch Behar	(SC)	Hiten Barman	All India Forward Bloc	4,90,982	Girindra Nath Barman	All India Trinamool Congress	2,64,413	2,26,569
West Bengal	2	Alipurduars	(ST)	Joachim Baxla	Revolutionary Socialist Party	3,84,252	Manoj Tigga	Bharatiya Janata Party	2,39,128	1,45,124
West Bengal	3	Jalpaiguri	GEN	Minati Sen	Communist Party of India (Marxist)	4,24,163	Parash Datta	All India Trinamool Congress	2,43,558	1,80,605
West Bengal	4	Darjeeling	GEN	Dawa Narbula	Indian National Congress	3,96,973	Moni Thapa	Communist Party of India (Marxist)	2,95,557	1,01,416
West Bengal	5	Raiganj	GEN	Priya Ranjan Dasmunsi	Indian National Congress	4,21,904	Minati Ghosh	Communist Party of India (Marxist)	3,82,757	39,147
West Bengal	6	Balurghat	(SC)	Ranen Barman	Revolutionary Socialist Party	4,15,298	Manomohan Ray	Bharatiya Janata Party	3,44,152	71,146
West Bengal	7	Malda	GEN	A. B. A. Ghani Khan Choudhury	Indian National Congress	4,12,913	Pranab Das	Communist Party of India (Marxist)	3,01,805	1,11,108
West Bengal	8	Jangipur	GEN	Pranab Mukherjee	Indian National Congress	4,31,647	Abul Hasnat Khan	Communist Party of India (Marxist)	3,94,787	36,860
West Bengal	9	Murshidabad	GEN	Abdul Mannan Hossain	Indian National Congress	4,61,895	Moinul Hassan	Communist Party of India (Marxist)	4,46,415	15,480
West Bengal	10	Berhampore	GEN	Adhir Ranjan Chowdhury	Indian National Congress	5,08,095	Promothes Mukherjee	Revolutionary Socialist Party	4,09,194	98,901
West Bengal	11	Krishnagar	GEN	Jyotirmoyee Sikdar	Communist Party of India (Marxist)	3,97,561	Satyabrata Mookherjee	Bharatiya Janata Party	3,77,174	20,387
West Bengal	12	Nabadwip	(SC)	Alakesh Das	Communist Party of India (Marxist)	5,60,176	Nilima Nag	All India Trinamool Congress	5,50,185	9,991
West Bengal	13	Barasat	GEN	Subrata Bose	All India Forward Bloc	5,20,384	Ranjit Kumar Panja	All India Trinamool Congress	5,08,224	12,160
West Bengal	14	Basirhat	GEN	Ajay Chakraborty	Communist Party of India	4,62,605	Sujit Bose	All India Trinamool Congress	2,80,521	1,82,084
West Bengal	15	Joynagar	(SC)	Sanat Kumar Mandal	Revolutionary Socialist Party	4,50,043	Asit Baran Thakur	Bharatiya Janata Party	2,19,522	2,30,521
West Bengal	16	Mathurapur	(SC)	Basudeb Barman	Communist Party of India (Marxist)	4,40,862	Radhika Ranjan Pramanick	All India Trinamool Congress	3,58,834	82,028
West Bengal	17	Diamond Harbour	GEN	Samik Lahiri	Communist Party of India (Marxist)	4,30,890	Saugata Roy	All India Trinamool Congress	2,77,106	1,53,784
West Bengal	18	Jadavpur	GEN	Sujan Chakraborty	Communist Party of India (Marxist)	5,05,396	Krishna Bose	All India Trinamool Congress	4,15,728	89,668
West Bengal	19	Barrackpore	GEN	Tarit Baran Topdar	Communist Party of India (Marxist)	4,43,048	Arjun Singh	All India Trinamool Congress	2,77,977	1,65,071
West Bengal	20	Dum Dum	GEN	Amitava Nandy	Communist Party of India (Marxist)	6,19,325	Tapan Sikdar	Bharatiya Janata Party	5,21,073	98,252
West Bengal	21	Calcutta North West	GEN	Sudhangshu Seal	Communist Party of India (Marxist)	1,51,772	Subrata Mukherjee	All India Trinamool Congress	1,08,768	43,004
West Bengal	22	Calcutta North East	GEN	Mohammed Salim	Communist Party of India (Marxist)	2,84,427	Ajit Kumar Panja	All India Trinamool Congress	2,10,647	73,780
West Bengal	23	Calcutta South	GEN	Mamata Banerjee	All India Trinamool Congress	3,93,561	Rabin Deb	Communist Party of India (Marxist)	2,95,132	98,429
West Bengal	24	Howrah	GEN	Swadesh Chakraborty	Communist Party of India (Marxist)	4,89,444	Bikram Sarkar	All India Trinamool Congress	2,42,507	2,46,937
West Bengal	25	Uluberia	GEN	Hannan Mollah	Communist Party of India (Marxist)	4,24,749	Rajib Banerjee	All India Trinamool Congress	2,72,634	1,52,115
West Bengal	26	Serampore	GEN	Santasri Chatterjee	Communist Party of India (Marxist)	4,04,082	Akbar Ali Khandoker	All India Trinamool Congress	2,72,634	1,31,448
West Bengal	27	Hooghly	GEN	Rupchand Pal	Communist Party of India (Marxist)	4,96,890	Indrani Mukherjee	All India Trinamool Congress	3,29,924	1,66,966
West Bengal	28	Arambagh	GEN	Anil Basu	Communist Party of India (Marxist)	7,44,464	Swapan Kumar Nandi	Bharatiya Janata Party	1,51,962	5,92,502
West Bengal	29	Panskura	GEN	Gurudas Dasgupta	Communist Party of India	5,41,513	Hema Choubey	All India Trinamool Congress	2,62,035	2,79,478
West Bengal	30	Tamluk	GEN	Lakshman Chandra Seth	Communist Party of India (Marxist)	5,07,228	Suvendu Adhikari	All India Trinamool Congress	4,49,848	57,380
West Bengal	31	Contai	GEN	Prasanta Pradhan	Communist Party of India (Marxist)	4,64,743	Nitish Sengupta	All India Trinamool Congress	4,05,553	59,190
West Bengal	32	Midnapore	GEN	Prabodh Panda	Communist Party of India	4,80,034	Rahul Sinha	Bharatiya Janata Party	3,19,274	1,60,760
West Bengal	33	Jhargram	(ST)	Rupchand Murmu	Communist Party of India (Marxist)	5,09,045	Nityananda Hembram	All India Trinamool Congress	1,57,702	3,51,343
West Bengal	34	Purulia	GEN	Bir Singh Mahato	All India Forward Bloc	3,41,057	Shantiram Mahato	Indian National Congress	1,95,339	1,45,718
West Bengal	35	Bankura	GEN	Basudeb Acharia	Communist Party of India (Marxist)	4,17,798	Deb Prasad Kundu	All India Trinamool Congress	1,87,469	2,30,329
West Bengal	36	Vishnupur	(SC)	Susmita Bauri	Communist Party of India (Marxist)	5,18,507	Janardan Saha	All India Trinamool Congress	1,86,678	3,31,829
West Bengal	37	Durgapur	(SC)	Sunil Khan	Communist Party of India (Marxist)	5,05,250	Shib Narayan Saha	Bharatiya Janata Party	2,27,742	2,77,508
West Bengal	38	Asansol	GEN	Bikash Chowdhury	Communist Party of India (Marxist)	3,69,832	Moloy Ghatak	All India Trinamool Congress	2,45,514	1,24,318
West Bengal	39	Burdwan	GEN	Nikhilananda Sar	Communist Party of India (Marxist)	6,73,091	Anindya Gopal Mitra	Bharatiya Janata Party	2,01,740	4,71,351
West Bengal	40	Katwa	GEN	Mahboob Zahedi	Communist Party of India (Marxist)	4,94,716	Sultan Ahmed	All India Trinamool Congress	351367	143,349
West Bengal	41	Bolpur	GEN	Somnath Chatterjee	Communist Party of India (Marxist)	5,04,836	Nirmal Kumar Maji	All India Trinamool Congress	1,94,531	3,10,305
West Bengal	42	Birbhum	(SC)	Ram Chandra Dome	Communist Party of India (Marxist)	3,72,294	Gopal Chandra Das	Indian National Congress	1,80,682	1,91,612

== See also ==
- Results of the 2009 Indian general election by parliamentary constituency
- Results of the 2004 Indian general election by party
