= Mahendra Padalia =

Indian politician

Mahendrabhai Padalia (born 1952) is an Indian politician from Gujarat. He is a member of the Gujarat Legislative Assembly from Dhoraji Assembly constituency in Rajkot district. He won the 2022 Gujarat Legislative Assembly election representing the Bharatiya Janata Party.

== Early life and education ==
Padalia is from Rajkot, Rajkot district, Gujarat. He is the son of Karshanbhai Padaliya. He completed his PhD in 2003 at Saurashtra University. Earlier, he did BSC in 1973, and LLM in 1979 also at Saurashtra University.

== Career ==
Padalia won from Dhoraji Assembly constituency representing the Bharatiya Janata Party in the 2022 Gujarat Legislative Assembly election. He polled 66,430 votes and defeated his nearest rival and sitting MLA, Lalit Vasoya of the Indian National Congress, by a margin of 12,248 votes.
