= Dambuk Assembly constituency =

Legislative Assembly constituency in Arunachal Pradesh State, India

Coordinates: 28.27°N 95.62°E

Dambuk
- Constituency No. 42 for the Arunachal Pradesh Legislative Assembly

Constituency details
- Country: India
- Region: Northeast India
- State: Arunachal Pradesh
- District: Lower Dibang Valley
- Lok Sabha constituency: Arunachal East
- Established: 1990
- Total electors: 13,012
- Reservation: ST

Member of Legislative Assembly
- 11th Arunachal Pradesh Legislative Assembly
- Incumbent Puinnyo Apum
- Party: Bharatiya Janata Party

Dambuk is one of the 60 Legislative Assembly constituencies of Arunachal Pradesh state in India.

It is part of Lower Dibang Valley district and is reserved for candidates belonging to the Scheduled Tribes.

== Members of the Legislative Assembly ==
Election	Member	Party
1990	Bassu Perme	Janata Dal
1995	Roding Pertin	Independent politician
1999	Roding Pertin	Indian National Congress
2004	Roding Pertin	Independent politician
2009	Jomin Tayeng	Nationalist Congress Party
2014	Gum Tayeng	Indian National Congress
2019	Gum Tayeng	Bharatiya Janata Party
2024	Puinnyo Apum	Bharatiya Janata Party

== Election results ==
=== Assembly Election 2024 ===
2024 Arunachal Pradesh Legislative Assembly election : Dambuk
Party	Candidate	Votes	%	±%
BJP	Puinnyo Apum	6,009	49.17%	▼2.97
PPA	Raju Tayeng	5,787	47.35%	New
INC	Tobing Lego	262	2.14%	▼0.58
Independent	Vijay Pertin	121	0.99%	New
NOTA	None of the Above	42	0.34%	▼0.80
Margin of victory		222	1.82%	▼6.33
Turnout		12,221	93.92%	▲4.02
Registered electors		13,012		▲9.23
BJP hold		Swing	▼2.97	

=== Assembly Election 2019 ===
2019 Arunachal Pradesh Legislative Assembly election : Dambuk
Party	Candidate	Votes	%	±%
BJP	Gum Tayeng	5,584	52.14%	▲9.08
NPP	Tony Pertin	4,711	43.99%	New
INC	Vijay Pertin	292	2.73%	▼52.28
NOTA	None of the Above	123	1.15%	▲0.53
Margin of victory		873	8.15%	▼3.80
Turnout		10,710	89.90%	▲1.41
Registered electors		11,913		▲5.95
BJP gain from INC		Swing	▼2.87	

=== Assembly Election 2014 ===
2014 Arunachal Pradesh Legislative Assembly election : Dambuk
Party	Candidate	Votes	%	±%
INC	Gum Tayeng	5,473	55.01%	▲5.67
BJP	Roding Pertin	4,284	43.06%	New
NPF	Gotem Tayeng	131	1.32%	New
NOTA	None of the Above	62	0.62%	New
Margin of victory		1,189	11.95%	▲10.62
Turnout		9,950	88.49%	▼3.37
Registered electors		11,244		▲5.36
INC gain from NCP		Swing	▲4.34	

=== Assembly Election 2009 ===
2009 Arunachal Pradesh Legislative Assembly election : Dambuk
Party	Candidate	Votes	%	±%
NCP	Jomin Tayeng	4,967	50.66%	New
INC	Roding Pertin	4,837	49.34%	▲3.13
Margin of victory		130	1.33%	▲0.65
Turnout		9,804	91.87%	▲15.10
Registered electors		10,672		▲9.33
NCP gain from Independent		Swing		

=== Assembly Election 2004 ===
2004 Arunachal Pradesh Legislative Assembly election : Dambuk
Party	Candidate	Votes	%	±%
Independent	Roding Pertin	3,513	46.88%	New
INC	Jomin Tayeng	3,462	46.20%	▼14.10
BJP	Bassu Perme	385	5.14%	New
AC	Punnya Apum	133	1.77%	▼37.92
Margin of victory		51	0.68%	▼19.93
Turnout		7,493	75.64%	▲4.71
Registered electors		9,761		▲4.37
Independent gain from INC		Swing	▼13.42	

=== Assembly Election 1999 ===
1999 Arunachal Pradesh Legislative Assembly election : Dambuk
Party	Candidate	Votes	%	±%
INC	Roding Pertin	4,064	60.31%	▲12.12
AC	Tony Pertin	2,675	39.69%	New
Margin of victory		1,389	20.61%	▲16.98
Turnout		6,739	73.59%	▼11.85
Registered electors		9,352		▲15.74
INC gain from Independent		Swing		

=== Assembly Election 1995 ===
1995 Arunachal Pradesh Legislative Assembly election : Dambuk
Party	Candidate	Votes	%	±%
Independent	Roding Pertin	3,513	51.81%	New
INC	Bidi Lego	3,267	48.19%	▲1.41
Margin of victory		246	3.63%	▼2.83
Turnout		6,780	85.37%	▲11.23
Registered electors		8,080		▼5.67
Independent gain from JD		Swing		

=== Assembly Election 1990 ===
1990 Arunachal Pradesh Legislative Assembly election : Dambuk
Party	Candidate	Votes	%	±%
JD	Bassu Perme	3,314	53.23%	New
INC	Makpel Pertin	2,912	46.77%	New
Margin of victory		402	6.46%	
Turnout		6,226	74.32%	
Registered electors		8,566		
JD win (new seat)				

== See also ==
- List of constituencies of the Arunachal Pradesh Legislative Assembly
- Lower Dibang Valley district
