= Rameshbhai Dhaduk =

Indian politician

Ramesh Dhaduk

Member of the Indian Parliament for Porbandar
- In office 23 May 2019 – 4 June 2024
- Preceded by: Vitthal Radadiya
- Succeeded by: Mansukh Mandaviya
- Constituency: Porbandar

Personal details
- Born: 5 September 1962 (age 63) Ghoghavadar
- Party: Bharatiya Janata Party
- Spouse: Manjulaben Dhaduk
- Children: Naimesh Dhaduk Drashti Vekariaya Sawan Dhaduk
- Parent: Lavjibhai Dhaduk Ujiben Dhaduk
- Occupation: Businessman, politician

Rameshbhai Lavjibhai Dhaduk is an Indian politician and a member of parliament to the 17th Lok Sabha from Porbandar Lok Sabha constituency, Gujarat.

He won the 2019 Indian general election being a Bharatiya Janata Party candidate.
