= Jashuben Korat =

Indian politician

Member of the Gujarat Legislative Assembly
- In office 1999–2012
- Preceded by: Savjibhai Korat
- Succeeded by: Jayesh Radadiya
- Constituency: Jetpur

Personal details
- Born: 27 July 1959 Vadal, Junagadh district, Gujarat, India
- Party: Bhartiya Janata Party
- Spouse: Savjibhai Korat
- Children: Dr. Bindeshwari Korat, Prashant Korat, Dr. Hiren Korat

Jashumben Savjibhai Korat alias Jashumatiben (born 27 July 1959) is an Indian politician and a former Minister for Women and Child Welfare of Gujarat state. She was a member of the Gujarat Legislative Assembly from 1999 to 2012. She is associated with the Bharatiya Janata Party.

== Biography ==
She was born into a farmer's family in an Indian village near Junagadh. She entered politics and was elected to the Gujarat Legislative Assembly in a by-election after sudden death of her husband, Savjibhai Korat, in 1999, as the Bharatiya Janata Party (BJP) candidate. She was a Member of Legislative Assembly from Jetpur constituency. In 2001, she was appointed the State Minister for Women and Child Welfare. In 2002 Gujarat legislative assembly election, she was reelected from Jetpur constituency. In 2005, she was again appointed the State Minister for Women and Child Welfare. In 2007 election, she was reelected to the 12th legislative assembly from Jetpur constituency. She continued to serve as the Minister until 2008.
