= Gordhanbhai Javia =

Indian politician

Member of Parliament, Lok Sabha
- In office 1996-2004
- Preceded by: Harilal Patel
- Succeeded by: Harilal Patel
- Constituency: Porbandar, Gujarat

Personal details
- Born: 9 March 1940 Patanvav, Rajkot District, British India
- Died: 15-08-2021
- Party: Bharatiya Janata Party

Gordhanbhai Javia (born 9 March 1940) is an Indian politician. He was elected to the Lok Sabha, the lower house of the Parliament of India, from Porbandar in Gujarat as a member of the Bharatiya Janata Party.
