= Balvantbhai Manvar =

Indian politician

Member of Parliament, Lok Sabha
- In office 1989-1991
- Preceded by: Parsotambhai Bhalodia
- Succeeded by: Harilal Patel
- Constituency: Porbandar, Gujarat

Personal details
- Born: 17 October 1943 (age 82) Bhayavadar, Rajkot District, British India
- Party: Janata Dal

Balvantbhai Manvar (born October 17, 1943) is an Indian politician. He was elected to the Lok Sabha, lower house of the Parliament of India from Porbandar in Gujarat as a member of the Janata Dal.
