= Dhoraji Assembly constituency =

Legislative Assembly constituency in Gujarat State, India

Coordinates: 21.73°N 70.45°E

Dhoraji
- Constituency No. 75 for the Gujarat Legislative Assembly

Constituency details
- Country: India
- Region: Western India
- State: Gujarat
- District: Rajkot
- Lok Sabha constituency: Porbandar
- Established: 1990
- Total electors: 268,706
- Reservation: None

Member of Legislative Assembly
- 15th Gujarat Legislative Assembly
- Incumbent Dr. Mahendrabhai Padalia
- Party: Bharatiya Janata Party
- Elected year: 2022

Dhoraji is one of the 182 Legislative Assembly constituencies of Gujarat state in India. It is part of Rajkot district, and is one of the 8 assembly seats under Porbandar.

== List of segments ==
This assembly seat represents the following segments,

1. Upleta Taluka
2. Dhoraji Taluka

== Members of Legislative Assembly ==
Year	Member	Picture	Party
1990	Vitthalbhai Radadiya		Bharatiya Janata Party
1995	Vitthalbhai Radadiya		Bharatiya Janata Party
1998	Vitthalbhai Radadiya		Rashtriya Janata Party
2002	Vitthalbhai Radadiya		Indian National Congress
2007	Vitthalbhai Radadiya		Indian National Congress
2009^	Jayesh Radadiya		Indian National Congress
2012	Vitthalbhai Radadiya		Indian National Congress
2013^	Pravin Makadiya		Bharatiya Janata Party
2017	Lalit Vasoya		Indian National Congress
2022	Dr. Mahendrabhai Padalia		Bharatiya Janata Party

- 2009^ (by-poll) - Jayesh Radadiya, after his father Vitthal Radadiya became an MP and gave up his Vidhan Saha seat
- 2012 - Vitthalbhai Radadiya, Congress
  - Vitthalbhai Radadiya joined BJP soon after the 2012 election and resigned from the assembly
- 2013^ (by-poll)

== Election results ==
=== 2022 ===
Gujarat Assembly election, 2022:Dhoraji Assembly constituency
Party	Candidate	Votes	%	±%
BJP	Mahendra Padalia	66430	42.84	
INC	Lalit Vasoya	54182	34.95	
AAP	Vipul Sakhiya	29794	19.22	
BSP	Prabhat Govind Solanki	1577	1.02	
NOTA	None of the above	1620	1.04	
Majority		12,248	7.89	
Turnout				
Registered electors		266,718		

=== 2017 ===
Gujarat Legislative Assembly Election, 2017: Dhoraji
Party	Candidate	Votes	%	±%
INC	Lalit Vasoya			
NOTA	None of the Above			
Majority				
Registered electors		250,620		
Turnout				

=== 2013 ===
2013 Gujarat Legislative Assembly By election
Party	Candidate	Votes	%	±%
BJP	Pravin Makadiya	44,751		
INC	Haribhai Patel	33,254		
Majority		11,497		
Turnout				
BJP gain from INC		Swing		

=== 2012 ===
Gujarat Assembly Election, 2012
Party	Candidate	Votes	%	±%
INC	Vitthalbhai Radadiya	76,189	46.44	
BJP	Haribhai Patel	73,246	44.65	
Majority		2,943	1.79	
Turnout		164,045	70.86	
INC hold		Swing		

== See also ==
- List of constituencies of the Gujarat Legislative Assembly
- Rajkot district
- Gujarat Legislative Assembly
