= Jetpur, Rajkot Assembly constituency =

Legislative Assembly constituency in Gujarat State, India

Coordinates: 21.76°N 70.62°E

Jetpur
- Constituency No. 74 for the Gujarat Legislative Assembly

Constituency details
- Country: India
- Region: Western India
- State: Gujarat
- District: Rajkot
- Lok Sabha constituency: Porbandar
- Total electors: 275,769
- Reservation: None

Member of Legislative Assembly
- 15th Gujarat Legislative Assembly
- Incumbent Jayesh Radadiya
- Party: Bharatiya Janata Party
- Elected year: 2022

Jetpur is one of the 182 Legislative Assembly constituencies of Gujarat state in India. It is part of Rajkot district.

== List of segments ==
This assembly seat represents the following segments,

1. Jamkandorna Taluka
2. Jetpur Taluka
3. Vadia Taluka (Part) of Amreli District Village – Devalki

== Members of Legislative Assembly ==
- 1998 - Savjibhai Korat, Bharatiya Janata Party
- 1999 (by-poll) - Jashuben Korat, Bharatiya Janata Party
- 2002 - Jashuben Korat, Bharatiya Janata Party
- 2007 - Jashuben Korat, Bharatiya Janata Party
- 2012 - Jayesh Radadiya, Indian National Congress
- 2013 (by-poll) - Jayesh Radadiya, Bharatiya Janata Party

Year	Member	Picture	Party
2017	Jayesh Radadiya		Bharatiya Janata Party
2022	Jayesh Radadiya		Bharatiya Janata Party

== Election results ==
=== 2022 ===
Gujarat Assembly election, 2022:Jetpur, Rajkot Assembly constituency
Party	Candidate	Votes	%	±%
BJP	Jayeshbhai Vitthalbhai Radadiya	106,470	60.79	
AAP	Rohitbhai Vinubhai Bhuva	29545	16.87	
SP	Rajubhai Arjanbhai Sarvaiya	20788	11.87	
INC	Deepakbhai Keshavlal Vekariya (D.K. Vekariya)	12244	6.99	
RRP	Alpeshkumar V. Vadoliya	386	0.22	N/A
NOTA	None of the above	2287	1.31	
Majority		76,926	43.92	
Turnout				
Registered electors		272,842		
BJP hold		Swing		

=== 2017 ===
Gujarat Assembly election, 2017: Jetpur
Party	Candidate	Votes	%	±%
BJP	Jayesh Radadiya	98,948	55.05	
INC	Ravi Ambaliya	73,367	40.82	
Majority		25,581	14.23	
Turnout		1,79,726	70.92	
BJP gain from INC		Swing		

=== 2013 ===
Gujarat Assembly By election, 2013
Party	Candidate	Votes	%	±%
BJP	Jayesh Radadiya	78,216		
INC	Jagdish Pambhar	25,310		
Majority		52,906		
Turnout				
BJP gain from INC		Swing		

== See also ==
- List of constituencies of Gujarat Legislative Assembly
- Gujarat Legislative Assembly
