= Dambuk =

- Town
- Location in Arunachal Pradesh, India Dambuk (India)
- Country: India
- State: Arunachal Pradesh
- District: Lower Dibang Valley
- Time zone: UTC+5:30 (IST)
- ISO 3166 code: IN-AR
- Climate: Cwa

Dambuk is a Tehsil in the Indian state of Arunachal Pradesh. Lower Dibang Valley is the name of the district that contains Tehsil Dambuk.

Dambuk is located 30 km towards west from District headquarters Roing. It is 268 km from State capital Itanagar towards West. It is one of the 60 constituencies of Legislative Assembly of Arunachal Pradesh. Name of current MLA (October-2016) of this constituency is Gum Tayeng.

== See also ==
- List of constituencies of Arunachal Pradesh Legislative Assembly
- Arunachal Pradesh Legislative Assembly
