= Jayesh Radadiya =

Indian politician (born 1981)

Jayesh Radadiya MLA - Gujarat
- જયેશ રાદડીયા

Minister of Food, Civil Supply and Consumer Affairs, Cottage Industries, Printing & Stationery in Government of Gujarat
- In office 8 August 2016 – Dec 2021
- Constituency: Jetpur, Gujarat

Minister of State for Water Supply (excluding Kalpasar) and Tourism in Government of Gujarat
- In office 19 November 2014 – August, 2016
- Constituency: Jetpur, Gujarat

Minister of State for Tourism & Civil Aviation in Government of Gujarat
- In office 1 November 2013 – November, 2014
- Constituency: Jetpur, Gujarat

Member of the Gujarat Legislative Assembly
- In office 2009–2012
- Constituency: Dhoraji

Member of the Gujarat Legislative Assembly
- Incumbent
- Assumed office 2012
- Constituency: Jetpur

Chairman of Shri Rajkot District Co-Operative Bank
- Incumbent
- Assumed office 2018-Present

Personal details
- Born: Jayesh Vitthalbhai Radadiya; 20 December 1981 (age 44) Jam Kandorna, Gujarat, India
- Party: Bharatiya Janata Party
- Spouse: Mitalben
- Children: 2
- Parent(s): Vitthalbhai Radadiya (father); Chetna Ben (mother)
- Education: M.S. University (BE Civil)
- Website: www.jayeshvradadiya.in

Jayesh Vitthalbhai Radadiya (born 20 December 1981) is an Indian politician from Bharatiya Janata Party and currently serving as the Cabinet Minister of Food, Civil Supply and Consumer Affairs, Cottage Industries, Printing & Stationery in Government of Gujarat. He is a member of the Gujarat Legislative Assembly representing Jetpur constituency in 14th Legislative Assembly of Gujarat.

== Early life and education ==
Jayesh was born on 20 December 1981 in Jam Kandorna village of Rajkot district in Gujarat state of India to a Gujarati Patidar family, Vitthalbhai Radadiya and Chetna Ben. His parents had 4 sons namely Vaibhav, Jayesh, and Kalpesh - Lalit (Twins) of which Vaibhav and Kalpesh died in young age. Jayesh holds a degree of BE Civil from M.S. University. He married Mital and the couple have a son Mahik and daughter Krishna.

== Political career ==
Jayesh has started his political career since his college days in M.S. University where he was elected as a General Secretary of the M.S. University Students Union, a statutory corporate body of the students in India. In 2009, he was elected as MLA from the Dhoraji constituency and represented the Indian National Congress. In 2012 he won the assembly elections from Jetpur on Congress ticket. But, he and his father then resigned in 2013 from Congress and joined BJP. In 2013, he was re-elected as MLA in a by-poll representing Bharatiya Janata Party from the Jetpur. He won from Jetpur again in 2017 and was made a minister by Chief Minister Vijay Rupani.

His father Vitthalbhai (1958-2019) was also a politician and Social Worker who had been elected as a Member of Gujarat Legislative Assembly for the five terms since 1990–2009, and later a Member of parliament, Lok Sabha for 2 terms from Porbandar Lok Sabha constituency since 2009.

Social Work:

BJP youth leader Jayesh Radadiya organized a grand wedding ceremony of 511 daughters named 'Prem Nu Panetar' in Jamkandorna. As Kariyavar (gift) he gave 120 items to every bride.
