= Savjibhai Korat =

Indian politician (1953–1998)

- Born: 6 August 1953; Juni Sankli, Rajkot district, Gujarat, India
- Died: 26 November 1998 (aged 45); Ahmedabad, Gujarat, India
- Spouse: Jashuben Korat
- Children: Bindeshwari Korat, Prashant Korat, Hiren Korat

Savjibhai Korat (6 August 1953 – 26 November 1998) was an Indian politician, a cabinet minister of Gujarat state.

Prime Minister of India Narendra Modi unveiling the statue of Savjibhai Korat. Jashuben Korat is on right.

== Biography ==
He was born in a farmer's family in Juni Sankli village near Jetpur.

In college days he joined politics, and he became the GS of P. D. Malaviya College, Rajkot. In the short span since he became a M.L.A. from Jetpur – 21 Constituency for the first time and continued repeating the same in the elections of 1995, he became the state minister for Road and Building and Panchayat. He worked under CM Keshubhai Patel and Suresh Mehta in that short span of 1995-1997. Again he was elected as a Member of the Legislative assembly from the same constituency for the third time. This time he got placed in the Cabinet Ministry and was given the portfolio of Road and Building.

=== Death ===
On the evening of 25 November 1998, after a meeting with state cabinet, he was admitted to hospital that evening after he collapsed while visiting his ailing mother, who was suffering from paralysis, at the New Civil Hospital, Ahemdabad. He was operated upon the same night to remove a blood clot from the brain. Though surgery helped stabilize his condition, it began to deteriorate. He was put on a respirator. On 26 November after fighting a losing battle against brain hemorrhage for two days, Savjibhai Korat died at the New Civil Hospital at 4:25 p.m. on Thursday, 26 November 1998.

Later, Korat's body was taken to Gandhinagar where a guard of honour was given at a function in the Sachivalaya premises. Besides the chief minister, Governor Anshuman Singh, cabinet ministers and senior bureaucrats placed wreaths at Korat's bier. Around 7 p.m., the body was brought to the BJP headquarters at Khanpur, where party workers paid homage. Around 8:30 p.m., the body was flown to Rakjot by helicopter, from where it was taken by road to his native village Juni Sankdi in Jetpur district. On Friday morning, 27 November, the body was taken to Jetpur district panchayat office for public viewing. Korat's body was donated to Rajkot Medical College. Korat's family also donated his eyes soon after the death. The tricolor on the Sachivalaya building was brought to half-mast around 5 p.m. after Korat's death. A Cabinet meeting was convened at Gandhinagar in the evening that day where a resolution condoling Korat's death was adopted. Also, it was decided that government offices in Gandhinagar district, Ahmedabad city and Rajkot district would remain closed on that particular weekend. The state government also announced three-day state mourning, beginning Friday.

== Memorial places ==
- Savjibhai Korat Bridge (Varacha, Surat)
- Savjibhai Korat Marg (Jetpur, Rajkot)
- Savjibhai Korat Municipal Market (Jetpur, Rajkot)
- Statue of Savjibhai Korat (Jetpur, Rajkot)
- Welcome Gate Savjibhai Korat (Juni Sankli, Jetpur, Rajkot)
- Savjibhai Korat Bus Depot, Jetpur (Jetpur, Rajkot)
- Takshashila College of Engineering and Technology (Savjibhai Korat Educational Trust) (Rajkot)
- Shri Savjibhai Korat Hospital, (Jetpur, Rajkot)
- Savajibhai Korat Bridge, (at village Barwala(Galath), Ta. bhesan, Dist. Junagadh )

Various other small streets, roads and bridges have been named after Savjibhai Korat
