= Jomin Tayeng =

Jomin Tayeng MLA of 42-Dambuk (ST) Assembly Constituency

Assembly Member for Legislative Assembly of Arunachal Pradesh
- In office 2009 – 7 May 2013
- Succeeded by: Gum Tayeng

Personal details
- Born: 1 February 1944 Roing
- Died: 7 May 2013 (aged 69) Guwahati
- Party: INC
- Spouse: Gum Tayeng
- Children: 4

Jomin Tayeng (1 February 1944 – 7 May 2013) was an Indian bureaucrat and politician who became the first direct recruit Officer of the Indian Administrative Service from Arunachal Pradesh in 1968.

== Early life and career ==
In 1976 he was appointed secretary to the Chief Minister of Arunachal Pradesh. After his retirement in 2004 he joined politics and contested the Dambuk constituency for the Legislative Assembly of Arunachal Pradesh as the INC candidate but was defeated. He contested the seat again in the 2009 election and was elected for the NCP; after the election he joined the INC.
