= Gum Tayeng =

Indian politician

Gum Tayeng MLA of 42-Dambuk (ST) Assembly Constituency

Assembly Member for Legislative Assembly of Arunachal Pradesh
- Incumbent
- Assumed office May 2014
- Preceded by: Jomin Tayeng

Personal details
- Born: Dambuk
- Party: Bharatiya Janata Party
- Other political affiliations: INC
- Spouse: Jomin Tayeng
- Children: 3 sons and 1 daughter
- Education: Lady Keane College, Shillong

Gum Tayeng is an Indian politician.

== Early life ==
In 1962 she passed her Pre-University course at Lady Keane College in Shillong. Afterwards she worked as a school teacher for some time.

On October 18, 2013, she was elected unopposed to the Arunachal Pradesh Legislative Assembly as an Indian National Congress candidate in a by-election in the Dambuk constituency. She is the widow of Jomin Tayeng, who had been elected to the Dambuk seat in the 2009 election.

Gum Tayeng was fielded as the Congress candidate in Dambuk in the 2014 Legislative Assembly election. She was one of only six women in the state to stand as a candidate.
