= Harilal Madhavjibhai Patel =

Indian politician

MP
- In office 1991–1996; 2004–2009
- Preceded by: Gordhanbhai Javia
- Succeeded by: Vitthalbhai Radadiya
- Constituency: Porbandar

Personal details
- Born: 7 January 1953 (age 73) Rajkot, Gujarat
- Party: Bharatiya Janata Party
- Spouse: Smt. Manjula Bahen
- Children: 1 son and 1 daughter
- As of 25 February, 2006

Harilal Madhavjibhai Patel (born 7 January 1953) is an Indian politician from the state of Gujarat. He was a member of Lok Sabha of India, representing the Porbandar constituency of Gujarat from 1991 to 1996, and later in 14th Lok Sabha 2004 to 2009, both times for Bharatiya Janata Party. He contested from Dhoraji in 2012 mid-term assembly elections on BJP ticket but lost to Vitthal Radadiya of Congress. He contested by-poll in 2013 from the same seat, this time on Congress' ticket, but lost again to Pravin Makadiya of BJP.
