= Lalit Vasoya =

Indian politician

Lalit Jashmat Vasoya is an Indian National Congress politician and was a member of the Gujarat Legislative Assembly between 2017 and 2022, elected from Dhoraji.
