= Porbandar Lok Sabha constituency =

Lok Sabha Constituency in Gujarat

Coordinates: 21.6°N 69.6°E

Porbandar
- Lok Sabha constituency

Constituency details
- Country: India
- Region: Western India
- State: Gujarat
- Assembly constituencies: Gondal; Jetpur; Dhoraji; Porbandar; Kutiyana; Manavadar; Keshod
- Established: 1977
- Reservation: None

Member of Parliament
- 18th Lok Sabha
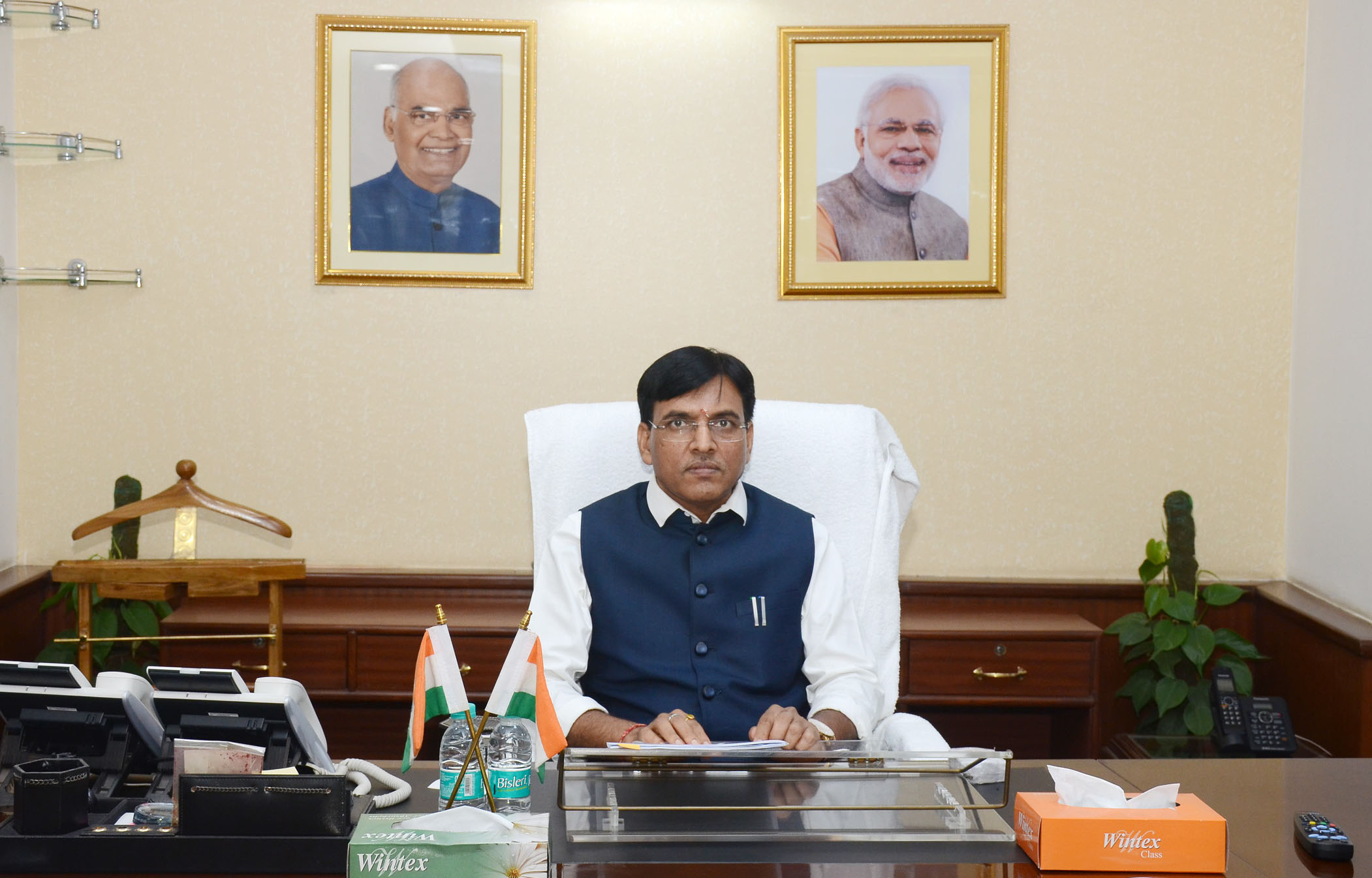
- Incumbent Mansukh Mandaviya; Union Minister of Labor and Employment; Union Minister of Youth Affairs and Sports
- Party: Bharatiya Janata Party
- Elected year: 2024

Porbandar Lok Sabha constituency is one of the 26 Lok Sabha (parliamentary) constituencies in Gujarat state in western India.

== Assembly segments ==
Presently, Porbandar Lok Sabha constituency comprises seven Vidhan Sabha (legislative assembly) segments. These are:

Constituency number	Name	Reserved for (SC/ST/None)	District	Party	2024 Lead
73	Gondal	None	Rajkot	BJP	BJP
74	Jetpur	None	Rajkot	BJP	BJP
75	Dhoraji	None	Rajkot	BJP	BJP
83	Porbandar	None	Porbandar	BJP	BJP
84	Kutiyana	None	Porbandar	SP	BJP
85	Manavadar	None	Junagadh	BJP	BJP
88	Keshod	None	Junagadh	BJP	BJP

== Members of Parliament ==
Year	Winner	Party
1977	Dharmasinhbhai Patel	Janata Party
1980	Maldevji Odedra	Indian National Congress
1984	Parsotambhai Bhalodia	Indian National Congress
1989	Balvantbhai Manvar	Janata Dal
1991	Harilal Patel	Bharatiya Janata Party
1996	Gordhanbhai Javia	Bharatiya Janata Party
1998	Gordhanbhai Javia	Bharatiya Janata Party
1999	Gordhanbhai Javia	Bharatiya Janata Party
2004	Harilal Patel	Bharatiya Janata Party
2009	Vitthalbhai Radadiya	Indian National Congress
2013^	Vitthalbhai Radadiya	Bharatiya Janata Party
2014	Vitthalbhai Radadiya	Bharatiya Janata Party
2019	Rameshbhai Dhaduk	Bharatiya Janata Party
2024	Mansukh Mandaviya	Bharatiya Janata Party

^ by poll.
Vitthalbhai Radadiya won Lok Sabha seat for Congress in 2009, but gave up the seat after he became MLA for Congress from Dhoraji after 2012 assembly elections. But he resigned from Congress immediately after those elections. And contested Lok Sabha by-poll of 2013 on BJP ticket and won. Dhoraji assembly by-poll in 2013 was won by BJP's Pravin Mankadia.

== Election results ==
=== General election 2024 ===
2024 Indian general election: Porbandar
Party	Candidate	Votes	%	±%
BJP	Mansukh Mandaviya	633,118	68.15	▲8.79
INC	Lalit Vasoya	2,49,458	26.89	▼8.28
NOTA	None of the above	13,563	1.46	▲0.63
Majority		3,83,660	41.26	▲17.07
Turnout		9,28,977	51.83	▼5.38
BJP hold		Swing	▲8.79	

=== General election 2019 ===
2019 Indian general elections: Porbandar
Party	Candidate	Votes	%	±%
BJP	Rameshbhai Dhaduk	563,881	59.36	−3.41
INC	Lalit Vasoya	3,34,058	35.17	+5.48
BSP	Samatbhai Govabhai Kadavala	10,092	1.06	−0.44
IND	Vimalbhai Ratilal Ramani	8,653	0.91	
NOTA	None of the Above	7,840	0.83	−1.20
Majority		2,29,823	24.19	−8.89
Turnout		9,51,107	57.21	+4.59
BJP hold		Swing		

=== General election 2014 ===
2014 Indian general elections: Porbandar
Party	Candidate	Votes	%	±%
BJP	Vitthalbhai Hansrajbhai Radadiya	508,437	62.77	
NCP	Kandhalbhai Sarmanbhai Jadeja	2,40,466	29.69	
NOTA	None of the Above	16,443	2.03	
BSP	Vrajalal Pababhai Sadiya	12,180	1.50	
AAP	Mansukh Sundaraji Dhokai	7,939	0.98	
Independent	Ranjitbhai Naranbhai Vakil	4,475	0.55	
Majority		2,67,971	33.08	
Turnout		8,09,985	52.62	
BJP hold		Swing		

=== By election 2013 ===
Bye-election, 2013: Porbandar
Party	Candidate	Votes	%	±%
BJP	Vitthalbhai Hansrajbhai Radadiya	289,893	64.06	
INC	Vinubhai Gordhanbhai Amipara	1,44,370	31.90	
Independent	Chandulal Mohanbhai Rathod	6,633	1.47	
Independent	Ajaykumar Nautamlal Pandya	4,439	0.98	
Independent	Rajeshbhai Maganbhai Butani	2,852	0.63	
Majority		1,45,523	32.16	
Turnout		4,52,654	30.28	
BJP gain from INC		Swing		

=== General election 2009 ===
2009 Indian general elections: Porbandar
Party	Candidate	Votes	%	±%
INC	Vitthalbhai Hansrajbhai Radadiya	3,29,436	49.87	
BJP	Mansukhbhai Shamjibhai Kachariya	2,89,933	43.89	
BSP	Mehulkumar Karsanbhai Chandravadiya	14,713	2.23	
Independent	Rajendra Amrutlal Parmar	11,905	1.80	
IJP	Nathabhai Jivabhai Jadeja	6,418	0.97	
Majority		39,503	5.98	
Turnout		6,60,653	47.67	
INC gain from BJP		Swing		

=== General election 2004 ===
2004 Indian general elections: Porbandar
Party	Candidate	Votes	%	±%
BJP	Harilal Madhavjibhai Patel	2,29,113	46.71	
INC	Vitthalbhai Hansrajbhai Radadiya	2,23,410	45.55	
Independent	Ajaybhai Vrujlal Mavani	14,064	2.87	
Independent	Gordhan Rajabhai Tukadiya	8,907	1.82	
BSP	Keshavbhai Aebhabhai Bhutiya	7,300	1.49	
Majority		5,703	1.16	
Turnout		4,90,480	49.29	
BJP hold		Swing		

== See also ==
- Porbandar district
- List of constituencies of the Lok Sabha
