= Vitthal Radadiya =

Indian politician (1958–2019)

Vitthalbhai Hansrajbhai Radadiya

Member of Parliament 15th Lok Sabha
- In office 2009–2019.
- Preceded by: Harilal Madhavjibhai Patel
- Constituency: Porbandar, Gujarat

Personal details
- Born: 8 November 1958. Rajkot, Bombay State, India
- Died: 29 July 2019 (aged 60) Ahmedabad, India
- Citizenship: India
- Party: Bharatiya Janata Party.
- Children: 3 sons.
- Profession: Social Worker & Politician.
- Committees: Committee on Agriculture (Member).

Vitthalbhai Hansrajbhai Radadiya (8 November 1958 – 29 July 2019) was an Indian politician who was a member of the 15th Lok Sabha of India. He represented the Porbandar constituency of Gujarat and was a member of the Bharatiya Janata Party political party. He was a five time Member of the Legislative Assembly and twice Member of parliament, Lok Sabha.

== Career ==
Radadiya had a B.A. degree and worked as a Social worker and politician. He ran a few schools through trusts. He was a BJP MLA who had joined Shankersinh Vaghela's Rashtriya Janata Party and afterward the Congress. In the early 1990s Radadiya joined the BJP, later he moved to the Congress Party. In 2013, he re-joined BJP. He represented Dhoraji Assembly constituency five times.

He was director of Indian Farmers Fertiliser Cooperative and the chairman of the Rajkot district co-operative bank.

Radadiya had sparked a controversy in October 2012 also after brandishing a gun at a toll booth employee after he asked for his identity card.

=== Posts held ===
No.	From	To	Position
1	1993	1997	MLA for BJP from Dhoraji, (9th assembly)
2	1998	2002	MLA for Vaghela's Party from Dhoraji, (10th assembly)
3	2002	2007	MLA for Congress from Dhoraji, (11th assembly)
4	2007	2009	MLA for Congress from Dhoraji, (12th assembly)
5	2009	2012	MP for Congress from Porbandar, 15th Lok Sabha
6	2012	2013	MLA for Congress from Dhoraji, (13th assembly)
7	2013	2014	MP for BJP from Porbandar (by-poll), 15th Lok Sabha
8	2014	2019	MP for BJP from Porbandar, 16th Lok Sabha

Radadiya won Lok Sabha seat for Congress in 2009, but gave up the seat after he became MLA for Congress from Dhoraji after 2012 assembly elections. He resigned from Congress immediately after those elections and contested Lok Sabha by-poll of 2013 on BJP ticket and won.

== Personal life ==
He was married to Chetna Ben. His son Jayesh Radadiya is also a politician and holds the portfolio for Gujarat Minister of Tourism and Aviation. Radadiya's son Kalpesh had died of cardiac arrest when in his 20s. In 2014, Radadiya married off Kalpesh's widow Manisha in her second marriage to Kalpesh's friend Hardik Chovatiya.

Radadiya died on 29 July 2019 due to cancer.

== See also ==
- List of members of the 15th Lok Sabha of India
- Politics of India
- Parliament of India
- Government of India
- Gujarat Legislative Assembly
