= List of members of the 14th Lok Sabha =

Members of Lok Sabha (2004-09)

Below is the list of members of the 14th Lok Sabha (2004-2009), by state.

== Andhra Pradesh ==
Keys:

- INC (31)
- TDP (5)
- TRS (3)
- CPI (1)
- CPI(M) (1)
- AIMIM (1)

No.	Constituency	Name of elected M.P.	Party affiliation
1	Srikakulam	Kinjarapu Yerran Naidu	Telugu Desam Party
2	Parvathipuram (ST)	Kishore Chandra Deo	Indian National Congress
3	Bobbili	Kondapalli Pydithalli Naidu (Died on 18.8.2006)	Telugu Desam Party
3	Bobbili	Botsa Jhansi Lakshmi (Elected on 7.12.2006)	Indian National Congress
4	Visakhapatnam	Nedurumalli Janardhana Reddy	Indian National Congress
5	Bhadrachalam (ST)	Babu Rao Mediyam	Communist Party of India (Marxist)
6	Anakapalli	Pappala Chalapathirao	Telugu Desam Party
7	Kakinada	Mallipudi Raju Pallam Mangapati	Indian National Congress
8	Rajahmundry	Aruna Kumar Vundavalli	Indian National Congress
9	Amalapuram (SC)	G.V. Harsha Kumar	Indian National Congress
10	Narasapur	Chegondi Venkata Harirama Jogaiah	Indian National Congress
11	Eluru	Kavuru Samba Siva Rao	Indian National Congress
12	Machilipatnam	Ramakrishna Badiga	Indian National Congress
13	Vijayawada	Rajagopal Lagadapati	Indian National Congress
14	Tenali	Balashowry Vallabhaneni	Indian National Congress
15	Guntur	Sambasiva Rayapati Rao	Indian National Congress
16	Bapatla	Daggubati Purandareswari	Indian National Congress
17	Narasaraopet	Mekapati Rajamohan Reddy	Indian National Congress
18	Ongole	Magunta Sreenivasulu Reddy	Indian National Congress
19	Nellore (SC)	Lakshmi Panabaka	Indian National Congress
20	Tirupathi (SC)	Chinta Mohan	Indian National Congress
21	Chittoor	D.K. Audikesavulu	Telugu Desam Party
22	Rajampet	Sai Prathap Annayyagari	Indian National Congress
23	Cuddapah	Y. S. Vivekananda Reddy	Indian National Congress
24	Hindupur	G Nizamuddin	Indian National Congress
25	Anantapur	Anantha Venkatarami Reddy	Indian National Congress
26	Kurnool	Kotla Jayasurya Prakasha Reddy	Indian National Congress
27	Nandyal	S. P. Y. Reddy	Indian National Congress
28	Nagarkurnool (SC)	Dr. Manda Jagannath	Telugu Desam Party
29	Mahabubnagar	D. Vittal Rao	Indian National Congress
30	Hyderabad	Asaduddin Owaisi	All India Majlis-e-Ittehadul Muslimeen
31	Secunderabad	M. Anjan Kumar Yadav	Indian National Congress
32	Siddipet (SC)	Sarvey Sathyanarayana	Indian National Congress
33	Medak	A. Narendra	Telangana Rashtra Samithi
34	Nizamabad	Madhu Goud Yaskhi	Indian National Congress
35	Adilabad	Madhusudhan Reddy Takkala (Resigned in Jan 2008)	Telangana Rashtra Samithi
35	Adilabad	Allola Indrakaran Reddy (Elected on 1.6.2008)	Indian National Congress
36	Peddapalli (SC)	G. Venkat Swamy	Indian National Congress
37	Karimnagar	K. Chandrashekar Rao (Resigned on 26.9.2006 and elected on 7.12.2006)	Telangana Rashtra Samithi
37	Karimnagar	K. Chandrashekar Rao (Resigned on 3.3.2008 and Elected on 1.6.2008)	Telangana Rashtra Samithi
37	Karimnagar	K. Chandrashekar Rao	Telangana Rashtra Samithi
38	Hanamkonda	B. Vinod Kumar (Resigned on 3.3.2008)	Telangana Rashtra Samithi
38	Hanamkonda	B. Vinod Kumar (Elected on 1.6.2008)	Telangana Rashtra Samithi
39	Warangal	Dharavath Ravinder Naik (Resigned in 2008)	Telangana Rashtra Samithi
39	Warangal	Yerrabelli Dayakararao (Elected on 1.6.2008)	Telugu Desam Party
40	Khammam	Renuka Chowdhury	Indian National Congress
41	Nalgonda	Suravaram Sudhakar Reddy	Communist Party of India
42	Miryalguda	Jaipal Reddy	Indian National Congress

== Arunachal Pradesh ==
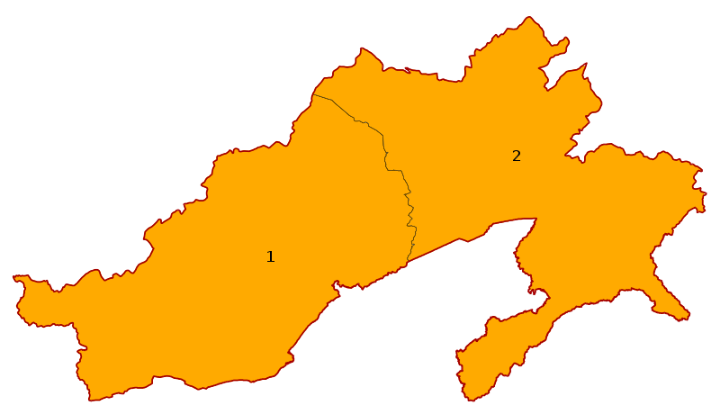

Keys: BJP (2)

No.	Constituency	Name of elected M.P.	Party affiliation
1	Arunachal West	Kiren Rijiju	Bharatiya Janata Party
2	Arunachal East	Tapir Gao	Bharatiya Janata Party

== Assam ==
Keys:

- INC (9)
- BJP (2)
- AGP (2)
- Independent (1)

No.	Constituency	Name of elected M.P.	Party affiliation
1	Karimganj (SC)	Lalit Mohan Suklabaidya	Indian National Congress
2	Silchar	Sontosh Mohan Dev	Indian National Congress
3	Autonomous District (ST)	Biren Singh Engti	Indian National Congress
4	Dhubri	Anwar Hussain	Indian National Congress
5	Kokrajhar (ST)	Sansuma Khunggur Bwiswmuthiary	Independent politician
6	Barpeta	A. F. Golam Osmani	Indian National Congress
7	Gauhati	Kirip Chaliha	Indian National Congress
8	Mangaldoi	Narayan Chandra Borkataky	Bharatiya Janata Party
9	Tezpur	Moni Kumar Subba	Indian National Congress
10	Nowgong	Rajen Gohain	Bharatiya Janata Party
11	Kaliabor	Dip Gogoi	Indian National Congress
12	Jorhat	Bijoy Krishna Handique	Indian National Congress
13	Dibrugarh	Sarbananda Sonowal	Asom Gana Parishad
14	Lakhimpur	Arun Kumar Sarmah	Asom Gana Parishad

== Bihar ==
Keys:

- RJD (22)
- JD(U) (6)
- BJP (5)
- LJP (4)
- INC (3)

No.	Constituency	Name of elected M.P.	Party affiliation
1	Bagaha (SC)	Kailash Baitha	Janata Dal
2	Bettiah	Raghunath Jha	Rashtriya Janata Dal
3	Motihari	Akhilesh Prasad Singh	Rashtriya Janata Dal
4	Gopalganj	Anirudh Prasad alias Sadhu Yadav	Rashtriya Janata Dal
5	Siwan	Mohammad Shahabuddin	Rashtriya Janata Dal
6	Maharajganj	Prabhunath Singh	Janata Dal
7	Chapra	Lalu Prasad	Rashtriya Janata Dal
8	Hajipur (SC)	Ram Vilas Paswan	Lok Janshakti Party
9	Vaishali	Raghubansh Prasad Singh	Rashtriya Janata Dal
10	Muzaffarpur	George Fernandes	Janata Dal
11	Sitamarhi	Sitaram Yadav	Rashtriya Janata Dal
12	Sheohar	Sitaram Singh	Rashtriya Janata Dal
13	Madhubani	Dr. Shakeel Ahmad	Indian National Congress
14	Jhanjharpur	Devendra Prasad Yadav	Rashtriya Janata Dal
15	Darbhanga	Md. Ali Ashraf Fatmi	Rashtriya Janata Dal
16	Rosera (SC)	Ram Chandra Paswan	Lok Janshakti Party
17	Samastipur	Alok Kumar Mehta	Rashtriya Janata Dal
18	Barh	Vijay Krishna	Rashtriya Janata Dal
19	Balia	Surajbhan Singh	Lok Janshakti Party
20	Saharsa	Ranjeet Ranjan	Lok Janshakti Party
21	Madhepura	Lalu Prasad (Resigned on 10.6.2004)	Rashtriya Janata Dal
21	Madhepura	Rajesh Ranjan alias Pappu Yadav (Elected on 17.10.2004)	Rashtriya Janata Dal
22	Araria (SC)	Sukdeo Paswan	Bharatiya Janata Party
23	Kishanganj	Md.Taslimuddin	Rashtriya Janata Dal
24	Purnea	Uday Singh	Bharatiya Janata Party
25	Katihar	Nikhil Kumar Choudhary	Bharatiya Janata Party
26	Banka	Giridhari Yadav	Rashtriya Janata Dal
27	Bhagalpur	Sushil Kumar Modi (Resigned on 16.5.2006)	Bharatiya Janata Party
27	Bhagalpur	Syed Shahnawaz Hussain (Elected on 9.11.2006)	Bharatiya Janata Party
28	Khagaria	Rabindra Ku. Rana	Rashtriya Janata Dal
29	Monghyr	Jay Prakash Narayan Yadav	Rashtriya Janata Dal
30	Begusarai	Rajiv Ranjan Singh	Janata Dal
31	Nalanda	Nitish Kumar (Resigned in 2006)	Janata Dal
31	Nalanda	Ram Swaroop Prasad (Elected on 9.11.2006)	Janata Dal
32	Patna	Ram Kripal Yadav	Rashtriya Janata Dal
33	Arrah	Kanti Singh	Rashtriya Janata Dal
34	Buxar	Lalmuni Chaubey	Bharatiya Janata Party
35	Sasaram (SC)	Mira Kumar	Indian National Congress
36	Bikramganj	Ajit Kumar Singh	Janata Dal
37	Aurangabad	Nikhil Kumar	Indian National Congress
38	Jahanabad	Ganesh Prasad Singh	Rashtriya Janata Dal
39	Nawada (SC)	Virchandra Paswan	Rashtriya Janata Dal
40	Gaya (SC)	Rajesh Kumar Manjhi	Rashtriya Janata Dal

== Chhattisgarh ==
Keys:

- BJP (9)
- INC (2)

No.	Constituency	Name of elected M.P.	Party affiliation
1	Surguja (ST)	Nand Kumar Sai	Bharatiya Janata Party
2	Raigarh (ST)	Vishnudeo Sai	Bharatiya Janata Party
3	Janjgir	Karuna Shukla	Bharatiya Janata Party
4	Bilaspur (SC)	Punnulal Mohle	Bharatiya Janata Party
5	Sarangarh (SC)	Guharam Ajgalle	Bharatiya Janata Party
6	Raipur	Ramesh Bais	Bharatiya Janata Party
7	Mahasamund	Ajit Jogi	Indian National Congress
8	Kanker (ST)	Sohan Potai	Bharatiya Janata Party
9	Bastar (ST)	Baliram Kashyap	Bharatiya Janata Party
10	Durg	Tarachand Sahu	Bharatiya Janata Party
11	Rajnandgaon	Pradeep Gandhi (Expelled from Lok Sabha on 23.12.2005)	Bharatiya Janata Party
11	Rajnandgaon	Devwrat Singh (Elected on 1.4.2007)	Indian National Congress

== Goa ==
Keys:

- BJP (1)
- INC (1)

No.	Constituency	Name of elected M.P.	Party affiliation
1	Panaji	Shripad Yesso Naik	Bharatiya Janata Party
2	Mormugao	Churchill Alemao (Resigned on 15.6.2007)	Indian National Congress
2	Mormugao	Francisco Sardinha (Elected on 3.11.2007)	Indian National Congress

== Gujarat ==
Keys:

- BJP (14)
- INC (12)

No.	Constituency	Name of elected M.P.	Party affiliation
1	Kutch	Pushpdan Shambhudan Gadhavi	Bharatiya Janata Party
2	Surendranagar	Somabhai Gandalal Koli Patel	Bharatiya Janata Party
3	Jamnagar	Vikrambhai Arjanbhai Madam	Indian National Congress
4	Rajkot	Dr. Vallabhbhai Kathiria	Bharatiya Janata Party
5	Porbandar	Harilal Madhavjibhai Patel	Bharatiya Janata Party
6	Junagadh	Jashubhai Dhanabhai Barad	Indian National Congress
7	Amreli	Virjibhai Thummar	Indian National Congress
8	Bhavnagar	Rajendrasinh Ghanshyamsinh Rana	Bharatiya Janata Party
9	Dhandhuka (SC)	Ratilal Kalidas Varma	Bharatiya Janata Party
10	Ahmedabad	Harin Pathak	Bharatiya Janata Party
11	Gandhinagar	L. K. Advani	Bharatiya Janata Party
12	Mehsana	Jivabhai Ambalal Patel	Indian National Congress
13	Patan (SC)	Mahesh Kumar Kanodia	Bharatiya Janata Party
14	Banaskantha	Harisinh Pratapsinh Chavda	Indian National Congress
15	Sabarkantha	Mahendrasinh Chauhan	Indian National Congress
16	Kapadvanj	Vaghela Shankersinh Laxmansinh	Indian National Congress
17	Dohad (ST)	Babubhai Khimabhai Katara	Bharatiya Janata Party
18	Godhra	Bhupendrasinh Prabhatsinh Solanki	Bharatiya Janata Party
19	Kaira	Dinsha Patel	Indian National Congress
20	Anand	Bharatsinh Madhavsinh Solanki	Indian National Congress
21	Chhota Udaipur (ST)	Naranbhai Rathwa	Indian National Congress
22	Vadodara	Jayaben Thakkar	Bharatiya Janata Party
23	Bharuch	Mansukhbhai Vasava	Bharatiya Janata Party
24	Surat	Kashiram Rana	Bharatiya Janata Party
25	Mandvi (ST)	Tushar Amarsinh Chaudhary	Indian National Congress
26	Bulsar (ST)	Kishanbhai Vestabhai Patel	Indian National Congress

== Haryana ==
Keys:

- INC (9)
- BJP (1)

No.	Constituency	Name of elected M.P.	Party affiliation
1	Ambala (SC)	Selja Kumari	Indian National Congress
2	Kurukshetra	Naveen Jindal	Indian National Congress
3	Karnal	Arvind Kumar Sharma	Indian National Congress
4	Sonepat	Kishan Singh Sangwan	Bharatiya Janata Party
5	Rohtak	Bhupinder Singh Hooda (Resigned on 6.6.2005)	Indian National Congress
5	Rohtak	Deepender Singh Hooda (Elected on 1.10.2005)	Indian National Congress
6	Faridabad	Avtar Singh Bhadana	Indian National Congress
7	Mahendragarh	Inderjit Singh Rao	Indian National Congress
8	Bhiwani	Kuldeep Bishnoi	Indian National Congress
9	Hissar	Jai Parkash	Indian National Congress
10	Sirsa (SC)	Atma Singh Gill	Indian National Congress

== Himachal Pradesh ==
Keys:

- INC (3)
- BJP (1)

No.	Constituency	Name of elected M.P.	Party affiliation
1	Shimla (SC)	Dhani Ram Shandil	Indian National Congress
2	Mandi	Pratibha Singh	Indian National Congress
3	Kangra	Chander Kumar	Indian National Congress
4	Hamirpur	Suresh Chandel (Ceased on 23.12.2005)	Bharatiya Janata Party
4	Hamirpur	Prem Kumar Dhumal (Elected on 5.6.2007 and Resigned on 27.2.2008)	Bharatiya Janata Party
4	Hamirpur	Anurag Thakur (Elected on 25.5.2008)	Bharatiya Janata Party

== Jammu and Kashmir ==
Keys:

- INC (2)
- JKNC (2)
- JKPDP (1)
- Independent (1)

No.	Constituency	Name of elected M.P.	Party affiliation
1	Baramulla	Abdul Rashid Shaheen	Jammu & Kashmir National Conference
2	Srinagar	Omar Abdullah	Jammu & Kashmir National Conference
3	Anantnag	Mehbooba Mufti	Jammu & Kashmir People's Democratic Party
4	Ladakh	Thupstan Chhewang	Independent politician
5	Udhampur	Chaudhary Lal Singh	Indian National Congress
6	Jammu	Madan Lal Sharma	Indian National Congress

== Jharkhand ==
Keys:

- INC (6)
- JMM (4)
- RJD (2)
- CPI (1)
- Independent (1)

No.	Constituency	Name of elected M.P.	Party affiliation
1	Rajmahal (ST)	Hemlal Murmu	Jharkhand Mukti Morcha
2	Dumka (ST)	Shibu Soren	Jharkhand Mukti Morcha
3	Godda	Furkan Ansari	Indian National Congress
4	Chatra	Dhirendra Agarwal	Rashtriya Janata Dal
5	Kodarma	Babulal Marandi(Resigned on 17.5.2006)	Bharatiya Janata Party
5	Kodarma	Babulal Marandi(Elected on 9.11.2006)	Independent politician
6	Giridh	Tek Lal Mahto	Jharkhand Mukti Morcha
7	Dhanbad	Chandra Shekhar Dubey	Indian National Congress
8	Ranchi	Subodh Kant Sahay	Indian National Congress
9	Jamshedpur	Sunil Kumar Mahato (Assassinated on 4.3.2007)	Jharkhand Mukti Morcha
9	Jamshedpur	Suman Mahato (Elected on 2.9.2007)	Jharkhand Mukti Morcha
10	Singbhum (ST)	Bagun Sumbrai	Indian National Congress
11	Khunti (ST)	Sushila Kerketta	Indian National Congress
12	Lohardaga (ST)	Rameshwar Oraon	Indian National Congress
13	Palamau (SC)	Manoj Kumar	Rashtriya Janata Dal
13	Palamau (SC)	Ghuran Ram	Rashtriya Janata Dal
14	Hazaribagh	Bhubneshwar Prasad Mehta	Communist Party of India

== Karnataka ==
Keys:

- BJP (16)
- INC (9)
- JD(S) (2)
- SP (1)

No.	Constituency	Name of elected M.P.	Party affiliation
1	Bidar (SC)	Ramchandra Veerappa (expired on 18.7.2004)	Bharatiya Janata Party
1	Bidar (SC)	Narsing Hulla Suryawanshi (Elected in Dec 2004)	Indian National Congress
2	Gulbarga	Iqbal Ahmed Saradgi	Indian National Congress
3	Raichur	A. Venkatesh Naik	Indian National Congress
4	Koppal	K. Virupaxappa	Indian National Congress
5	Bellary	Gali Karunakara Reddy	Bharatiya Janata Party
6	Davangere	G.M. Siddeswara	Bharatiya Janata Party
7	Chitradurga	N.Y. Hanumanthappa	Indian National Congress
8	Tumkur	S. Mallikarjunaiah	Bharatiya Janata Party
9	Chikballapur	R.L. Jalappa	Indian National Congress
10	Kolar (SC)	K.H. Muniyappa	Indian National Congress
11	Kanakapura	Tejashwini Ramesh	Indian National Congress
12	Bangalore North	H. T. Sangliana	Bharatiya Janata Party
13	Bangalore South	Ananth Kumar	Bharatiya Janata Party
14	Mandya	Ambareesh	Indian National Congress
15	Chamarajnagar (SC)	Kagalvadi M. Shivanna	Janata Dal
16	Mysore	C. H. Vijayashankar	Bharatiya Janata Party
17	Mangalore	D. V. Sadananda Gowda	Bharatiya Janata Party
18	Udupi	Manorama Madhwaraj	Bharatiya Janata Party
19	Hassan	H. D. Devegowda	Janata Dal
20	Chikmagalur	D. C. Srikantappa	Bharatiya Janata Party
21	Shimoga	S. Bangarappa (Resigned on 10.3.2005)	Bharatiya Janata Party
21	Shimoga	S. Bangarappa (Elected on 6.6.2005)	Samajwadi Party
22	Kanara	Anant Kumar Hegde	Bharatiya Janata Party
23	Dharwad South	Manjunath Kunnur	Bharatiya Janata Party
24	Dharwad North	Pralhad Joshi	Bharatiya Janata Party
25	Belgaum	Suresh Angadi	Bharatiya Janata Party
26	Chikkodi (SC)	Jigajinagi Ramesh Chandappa	Bharatiya Janata Party
27	Bagalkot	Gaddigoudar Parvatagouda Chandanagouda	Bharatiya Janata Party
28	Bijapur	Basangouda Patil	Bharatiya Janata Party

== Kerala ==
Keys:

- CPI(M) (12)
- CPI (3)
- JD(S) (1)
- KC(J) (1)
- IUML (1)
- Indian Federal Democratic Party (1)
- Independent (1)

No.	Constituency	Name of elected M.P.	Party affiliation
1	Kasaragod	P. Karunakaran	Communist Party of India
2	Cannanore	A. P. Abdullakutty	Communist Party of India
3	Vatakara	P. Satheedevi	Communist Party of India
4	Kozhikode	M. P. Veerendra Kumar	Janata Dal
5	Manjeri	T. K. Hamza	Communist Party of India
6	Ponnani	E. Ahammed	Indian Union Muslim League
7	Palghat	N. N. Krishnadas	Communist Party of India
8	Ottapalam (SC)	S. Ajaya Kumar	Communist Party of India
9	Trichur	C. K. Chandrappan	Communist Party of India
10	Mukundapuram	Lonappan Nambadan	Communist Party of India
11	Ernakulam	Dr. Sebastian Paul	Independent politician
12	Muvattapuzha	P. C. Thomas	Indian Federal Democratic Party
13	Kottayam	K. Suresh Kurup	Communist Party of India
14	Idukki	K. Francis George	Kerala Congress
15	Alleppey	Dr. K. S. Manoj	Communist Party of India
16	Mavelikara	C. S. Sujatha	Communist Party of India
17	Adoor (SC)	Chengara Surendran	Communist Party of India
18	Quilon	P. Rajendran	Communist Party of India
19	Chirayinkil	Varkala Radhakrishnan	Communist Party of India
20	Trivandrum	P. K. Vasudevan Nair (Died on 12.7.2005)	Communist Party of India
20	Trivandrum	Pannyan Raveendran (Elected on 22.11.2005)	Communist Party of India

== Madhya Pradesh ==
Keys:

- BJP (24)
- INC (5)

No.	Constituency	Name of elected M.P.	Party affiliation
1	Morena (SC)	Ashok Chhaviram Argal	Bharatiya Janata Party
2	Bhind	Dr. Ramlakhan Singh	Bharatiya Janata Party
3	Gwalior	Ramsevak Singh (Expelled on 23.12.2005)	Indian National Congress
3	Gwalior	Yashodhara Raje Scindia (Elected on 11.3.2007)	Bharatiya Janata Party
4	Guna	Jyotiraditya Madhavrao Scindia	Indian National Congress
5	Sagar (SC)	Virendra Kumar	Bharatiya Janata Party
6	Khajuraho	Ramkrishna Kusmaria	Bharatiya Janata Party
7	Damoh	Chandrabhan Bhaiya	Bharatiya Janata Party
8	Satna	Ganesh Singh	Bharatiya Janata Party
9	Rewa	Chandramani Tripathi	Bharatiya Janata Party
10	Sidhi (ST)	Chandrapratap Singh ( Expelled on 23.12.2005)	Bharatiya Janata Party
10	Sidhi (ST)	Manik Singh (Elected on 11.3.2007)	Indian National Congress
11	Shahdol (ST)	Dalpat Singh Paraste	Bharatiya Janata Party
12	Balaghat	Gaurishankar Bisen	Bharatiya Janata Party
13	Mandla (ST)	Faggan Singh Kulaste	Bharatiya Janata Party
14	Jabalpur	Rakesh Singh	Bharatiya Janata Party
15	Seoni	Neeta Pateriya	Bharatiya Janata Party
16	Chhindwara	Kamalnath	Indian National Congress
17	Betul	Vijay Kumar Khandelwal (expired on 12.11.2007)	Bharatiya Janata Party
17	Betul	Hemant Khandelwal (Elected on 16.4.2008)	Bharatiya Janata Party
18	Hoshangabad	Sartaj Singh	Bharatiya Janata Party
19	Bhopal	Kailash Joshi	Bharatiya Janata Party
20	Vidisha	Shivraj Singh Chouhan (Resigned from Lok sabha in 2006 to become CM)	Bharatiya Janata Party
20	Vidisha	Rampal Singh (Elected on 2.11.2006)	Bharatiya Janata Party
21	Rajgarh	Lakshman Singh	Bharatiya Janata Party
22	Shajapur (SC)	Thawar Chand Gehlot	Bharatiya Janata Party
23	Khandwa	Nand Kumar Singh Chauhan (Nandu Bhaiya)	Bharatiya Janata Party
24	Khargone	Krishna Murari Moghe (Ceased on 10.7.2007)	Bharatiya Janata Party
24	Khargone	Arun Yadav (Elected on 15.12.2007)	Indian National Congress
25	Dhar (ST)	Chhatar Singh Darbar	Bharatiya Janata Party
26	Indore	Sumitra Mahajan	Bharatiya Janata Party
27	Ujjain (SC)	Dr.Satyanarayan Jatiya	Bharatiya Janata Party
28	Jhabua (ST)	Kantilal Bhuria	Indian National Congress
29	Mandsaur	Dr. Laxminarayan Pandeya	Bharatiya Janata Party

== Maharashtra ==
Keys:

- INC (13)
- BJP (12)
- SS (12)
- NCP (10)
- RPI(A) (1)

No.	Constituency	Name of elected M.P.	Party affiliation
1	Rajapur	Suresh Prabhakar Prabhu	Shiv Sena
2	Ratnagiri	Anant Gangaram Geete	Shiv Sena
3	Kolaba	A. R. Antulay	Indian National Congress
4	Mumbai South	Milind Deora	Indian National Congress
5	Mumbai South Central	Mohan Rawale	Shiv Sena
6	Mumbai North Central	Eknath Gaikwad	Indian National Congress
7	Mumbai North East	Gurudas Kamat	Indian National Congress
8	Mumbai North West	Sunil Dutt (Died on 25.5.2005)	Indian National Congress
8	Mumbai North West	Priya Dutt (Elected on 22.11.2005)	Indian National Congress
9	Mumbai North	Govinda	Indian National Congress
10	Thane	Prakash Paranjape (Died on 20.2.2008)	Shiv Sena
10	Thane	Anand Paranjpe (Elected on 25.5.2008)	Shiv Sena
11	Dahanu (ST)	Damodar Barku Shingada	Indian National Congress
12	Nashik	Devidas Anandrao Pingale	Nationalist Congress Party
13	Malegaon (ST)	Harischandra Devram Chavan	Bharatiya Janata Party
14	Dhule (ST)	Bapu Hari Chaure	Indian National Congress
15	Nandurbar (ST)	Manikrao Hodlya Gavit	Indian National Congress
16	Erandol	Annasaheb M. K. Patil (Expelled on 23.12.2005)	Bharatiya Janata Party
16	Erandol	Adv.Vasantrao J More (Elected on 12.4.2007)	Nationalist Congress Party
17	Jalgaon	Y. G. Mahajan (Expelled on 23.12.2005)	Bharatiya Janata Party
17	Jalgaon	Haribhau Jawale (Elected on 12.4.2007)	Bharatiya Janata Party
18	Buldhana (SC)	Anandrao Vithoba Adsul	Shiv Sena
19	Akola	Sanjay Shamrao Dhotre	Bharatiya Janata Party
20	Washim	Bhavana Pundlikrao Gawali	Shiv Sena
21	Amravati	Anant Gudhe	Shiv Sena
22	Ramtek	Subodh Mohite (Resigned on 14.2.2007)	Shiv Sena
22	Ramtek	Prakash Jadhav (Elected on 12.4.2007)	Shiv Sena
23	Nagpur	Vilas Muttemwar	Indian National Congress
24	Bhandara	Shishupal Natthu Patle	Bharatiya Janata Party
25	Chimur	Mahadeorao Sukaji Shivankar	Bharatiya Janata Party
26	Chandrapur	Hansraj Gangaram Ahir	Bharatiya Janata Party
27	Wardha	Suresh Ganapat Wagmare	Bharatiya Janata Party
28	Yavatmal	Harising Nasaru Rathod	Bharatiya Janata Party
29	Hingoli	Suryakanta Patil	Nationalist Congress Party
30	Nanded	D. B. Patil	Bharatiya Janata Party
31	Parbhani	Tukaram Ganpatrao Renge Patil	Shiv Sena
32	Jalna	Raosaheb Dadarao Danve	Bharatiya Janata Party
33	Aurangabad	Chandrakant Khaire	Shiv Sena
34	Beed	Jaisingrao Gaikwad Patil	Nationalist Congress Party
35	Latur	Rupatai Patil Nilangekar	Bharatiya Janata Party
36	Osmanabad (SC)	Kalpana Ramesh Narhire	Shiv Sena
37	Solapur	Subhash Sureshchandra Deshmukh	Bharatiya Janata Party
38	Pandharpur (SC)	Ramdas Athawale	Republican Party of India
39	Ahmednagar	Tukaram Gangadhar Gadakh	Nationalist Congress Party
40	Kopargaon	Balasaheb Vikhe Patil	Indian National Congress
41	Khed	Shivajirao Adhalarao Patil	Shiv Sena
42	Pune	Suresh Kalmadi	Indian National Congress
43	Baramati	Sharad Pawar	Nationalist Congress Party
44	Satara	Laxmanrao Pandurang Jadhav (Patil)	Nationalist Congress Party
45	Karad	Shriniwas Dadasaheb Patil	Nationalist Congress Party
47	Sangli	Prakashbapu Vasantdada Patil (Resigned in Oct 2005)	Indian National Congress
47	Sangli	Pratik Prakashbapu Patil (Elected on 24.1.2006)	Indian National Congress
47	Ichalkaranji	Nivedita Sambhajirao Mane	Nationalist Congress Party
48	Kolhapur	Sadashivrao Dadoba Mandlik	Nationalist Congress Party

== Manipur ==
- INC (1)
- Independent (1)

No.	Constituency	Name of elected M.P.	Party affiliation
1	Inner Manipur	Thokchom Meinya	Indian National Congress
2	Outer Manipur (ST)	Mani Charenamei	Independent politician

== Meghalaya ==
Keys:

- INC (1)
- NCP (1)

No.	Constituency	Name of elected M.P.	Party affiliation
1	Shillong	Paty Ripple Kyndiah	Indian National Congress
2	Tura	P. A. Sangma (Resigned on 10.10.2005)	All India Trinamool Congress
2	Tura	P. A. Sangma (Elected on 19.02.2006 and Resigned in March 2008)	Nationalist Congress Party
2	Tura	Agatha Sangma (Elected in May 2008)	Nationalist Congress Party

== Mizoram ==
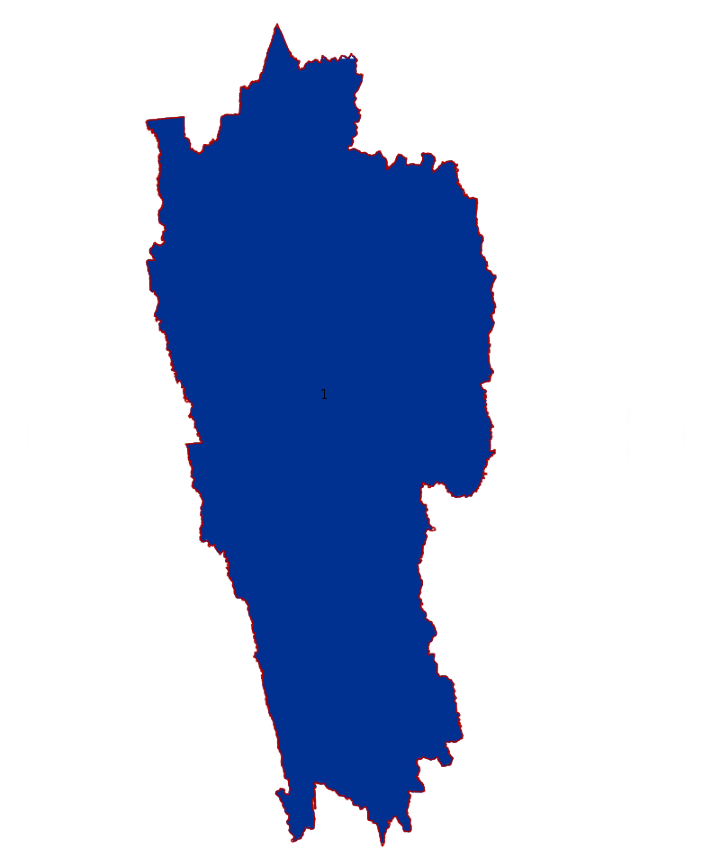

Keys:

- MNF (1)

No.	Constituency	Name of elected M.P.	Party affiliation
1	Mizoram (ST)	Vanlalzawma	Mizo National Front

== Nagaland ==
Keys:

- NPF (1)

No.	Constituency	Name of elected M.P.	Party affiliation
1	Nagaland	W. Wangyuh	Nagaland People's Front

== Orissa ==
Keys:

- BJD (11)
- BJP (7)
- INC (2)
- JMM (1)

No.	Constituency	Name of elected M.P.	Party affiliation
1	Mayurbhanj (ST)	Sudam Marndi	Jharkhand Mukti Morcha
2	Balasore	M. A. Kharabela Swain	Bharatiya Janata Party
3	Bhadrak (SC)	Arjun Charan Sethi	Biju Janata Dal
4	Jajpur (SC)	Mohan Jena	Biju Janata Dal
5	Kendrapara	Archana Nayak	Biju Janata Dal
6	Cuttack	Bhartruhari Mahtab	Biju Janata Dal
7	Jagatsinghpur	Brahmananda Panda	Biju Janata Dal
8	Puri	Braja Kishore Tripathy	Biju Janata Dal
9	Bhubaneswar	Prasanna Kumar Patasani	Biju Janata Dal
10	Aska	Hari Har Swain	Biju Janata Dal
11	Berhampur	Chandra Sekhar Sahu	Indian National Congress
12	Koraput (ST)	Giridhar Gamang	Indian National Congress
13	Nowrangpur (ST)	Parsuram Majhi	Bharatiya Janata Party
14	Kalahandi	Bikram Keshari Deo	Bharatiya Janata Party
15	Phulbani (SC)	Sugrib Singh	Biju Janata Dal
16	Bolangir	Sangeeta Kumari Singh Deo	Bharatiya Janata Party
17	Sambalpur	Prasanna Acharya	Biju Janata Dal
18	Deogarh	Dharmendra Pradhan	Bharatiya Janata Party
19	Dhenkanal	Tathagata Satapathy	Biju Janata Dal
20	Sundargarh (ST)	Jual Oram	Bharatiya Janata Party
21	Keonjhar (ST)	Ananta Nayak	Bharatiya Janata Party

== Punjab ==
Keys:

- SAD (8)
- BJP (3)
- INC (2)

No.	Constituency	Name of elected M.P.	Party affiliation
1	Gurdaspur	Vinod Khanna	Bharatiya Janata Party
2	Amritsar	Navjot Singh Sidhu (Resigned on 4.12.2006)	Bharatiya Janata Party
2	Amritsar	Navjot Singh Sidhu (Elected on 27.02.2007)	Bharatiya Janata Party
3	Tarntaran	Dr. Rattan Singh Ajnala	Shiromani Akali Dal
4	Jullundur	Rana Gurjeet Singh	Indian National Congress
5	Phillaur (SC)	Charanjit Singh Atwal	Shiromani Akali Dal
6	Hoshiarpur	Avinash Rai Khanna	Bharatiya Janata Party
7	Ropar (SC)	Sukhdev Singh Libra	Shiromani Akali Dal
8	Patiala	Preneet Kaur	Indian National Congress
9	Ludhiana	Sharanjit Singh Dhillon	Shiromani Akali Dal
10	Sangrur	Sukhdev Singh Dhindsa	Shiromani Akali Dal
11	Bhatinda (SC)	Paramjit Kaur Gulshan	Shiromani Akali Dal
12	Faridkot	Sukhbir Singh Badal	Shiromani Akali Dal
13	Firozpur	Zora Singh Maan	Shiromani Akali Dal

== Rajasthan ==
Keys:

- BJP (21)
- INC (4)

No.	Constituency	Name of elected M.P.	Party affiliation
1	Ganganagar (SC)	Nihalchand Chauhan	Bharatiya Janata Party
2	Bikaner	Dharmendra	Bharatiya Janata Party
3	Churu	Ram Singh Kaswan	Bharatiya Janata Party
4	Jhunjhunu	Sis Ram Ola	Indian National Congress
5	Sikar	Subhash Maharia	Bharatiya Janata Party
6	Jaipur	Girdhari Lal Bhargava	Bharatiya Janata Party
7	Dausa	Sachin Pilot	Indian National Congress
8	Alwar	Dr. Karan Singh Yadav	Indian National Congress
9	Bharatpur	Vishvendra Singh	Bharatiya Janata Party
10	Bayana (SC)	Ramswaroop Koli	Bharatiya Janata Party
11	Sawai Madhopur (ST)	Namo Narain Meena	Indian National Congress
12	Ajmer	Rasa Singh Rawat	Bharatiya Janata Party
13	Tonk (SC)	Kailash Meghwal	Bharatiya Janata Party
14	Kota	Raghuveer Singh Koshal	Bharatiya Janata Party
15	Jhalawar	Dushyant Singh	Bharatiya Janata Party
16	Banswara (ST)	Dhan Singh Rawat	Bharatiya Janata Party
17	Salumber (ST)	Mahaveer Bhagora	Bharatiya Janata Party
18	Udaipur	Kiran Maheshwari	Bharatiya Janata Party
19	Chittorgarh	Shrichand Kriplani	Bharatiya Janata Party
20	Bhilwara	Vijayendrapal Singh	Bharatiya Janata Party
21	Pali	Pusp Jain	Bharatiya Janata Party
22	Jalore (SC)	B. Susheela	Bharatiya Janata Party
23	Barmer	Manvendra Singh	Bharatiya Janata Party
24	Jodhpur	Jaswant Singh Bishnoi	Bharatiya Janata Party
25	Nagaur	Bhanwar Singh Dangawas	Bharatiya Janata Party

== Sikkim ==
Keys:

- SDF (1)

No.	Constituency	Name of elected M.P.	Party affiliation
1	Sikkim	Nakul Das Rai	Sikkim Democratic Front

== Tamil Nadu ==
Keys:

- DMK (16)
- INC (10)
- PMK (5)
- MDMK (4)
- CPI (2)
- CPI(M) (2)

No.	Constituency	Name of elected M.P.	Party affiliation
1	Chennai North	C Kuppusami	Dravida Munnetra Kazhagam
2	Chennai Central	Dayanidhi Maran	Dravida Munnetra Kazhagam
3	Chennai South	T.R. Baalu	Dravida Munnetra Kazhagam
4	Sriperumbudur (SC)	A. Krishnaswamy	Dravida Munnetra Kazhagam
5	Chengalpattu	A.K. Moorthy	Pattali Makkal Katchi
6	Arakkonam	R. Velu	Pattali Makkal Katchi
7	Vellore	K.M. Kader Mohideen	Dravida Munnetra Kazhagam
8	Tiruppattur	D. Venugopal	Dravida Munnetra Kazhagam
9	Vandavasi	N. Ramachandran Gingee	Marumalarchi Dravida Munnetra Kazhagam
10	Tindivanam	K. Dhanaraju	Pattali Makkal Katchi
11	Cuddalore	K. Venkatapathy	Dravida Munnetra Kazhagam
12	Chidambaram (SC)	E. Ponnuswamy	Pattali Makkal Katchi
13	Dharampuri	Dr. R. Senthil	Pattali Makkal Katchi
14	Krishnagiri	E.G. Sugavanam	Dravida Munnetra Kazhagam
15	Rasipuram (SC)	K. Rani	Indian National Congress
16	Salem	K. V. Thangkabalu	Indian National Congress
17	Tiruchengode	Subbulakshmi Jagadeesan	Dravida Munnetra Kazhagam
18	Nilgiris	R. Prabhu	Indian National Congress
19	Gobichettipalayam	E.V.K.S. Elangovan	Indian National Congress
20	Coimbatore	K. Subbarayan	Communist Party of India
21	Pollachi (SC)	Dr. C. Krishnan	Marumalarchi Dravida Munnetra Kazhagam
22	Palani	S.K. Kharventhan	Indian National Congress
23	Dindigul	N.S.V. Chitthan	Indian National Congress
24	Madurai	P. Mohan	Communist Party of India
25	Periyakulam	J.M. Aaron Rashid	Indian National Congress
26	Karur	K. C. Palanisamy	Dravida Munnetra Kazhagam
27	Tiruchirappalli	L. Ganesan	Marumalarchi Dravida Munnetra Kazhagam
28	Perambalur (SC)	A. Raja	Dravida Munnetra Kazhagam
29	Mayiladuthurai	Mani Shankar Aiyar	Indian National Congress
30	Nagapattinam (SC)	A.K.S. Vijayan	Dravida Munnetra Kazhagam
31	Thanjavur	S.S. Palanimanickam	Dravida Munnetra Kazhagam
32	Pudukkottai	S. Regupathy	Dravida Munnetra Kazhagam
33	Shivaganga	P. Chidambaram	Indian National Congress
34	Ramanathapuram	M.S.K. Bhavani Rajenthiran	Dravida Munnetra Kazhagam
35	Sivakasi	A. Ravichandran	Marumalarchi Dravida Munnetra Kazhagam
36	Tirunelveli	R. Dhanuskodi Athithan	Indian National Congress
37	Tenkasi (SC)	M. Appadurai	Communist Party of India
38	Tiruchendur	V. Radhika Selvi	Dravida Munnetra Kazhagam
39	Nagercoil	A.V. Bellarmin	Communist Party of India

== Tripura ==
Keys:

- CPI(M) (2)

No.	Constituency	Name of elected M.P.	Party affiliation
1	Tripura West	Khagen Das	Communist Party of India
2	Tripura East (ST)	Baju Ban Riyan	Communist Party of India

== Uttar Pradesh ==
Keys:

- SP (36)
- BSP (19)
- BJP (10)
- INC (9)
- RLD (3)
- JD(U) (1)
- NLP (1)
- Independent (1)

No.	Constituency	Name of elected M.P.	Party affiliation
1	Bijnor (SC)	Munshiram Singh	Rashtriya Lok Dal
2	Amroha	Harish Nagpal	Independent politician
3	Moradabad	Dr. Shafiqurrahman Barq	Samajwadi Party
4	Rampur	P. Jaya Prada Nahata	Samajwadi Party
5	Sambhal	Prof. Ram Gopal Yadav	Samajwadi Party
6	Budaun	Saleem Iqbal Shervani	Samajwadi Party
7	Aonla	Kunwar Sarvraj Singh	Janata Dal
8	Bareilly	Santosh Gangwar	Bharatiya Janata Party
9	Pilibhit	Maneka Gandhi	Bharatiya Janata Party
10	Shahjahanpur	Kunwar Jitin Prasad	Indian National Congress
11	Kheri	Ravi Prakash Verma	Samajwadi Party
12	Shahabad	Iliyas Azmi	Bahujan Samaj Party
13	Sitapur	Rajesh Verma	Bahujan Samaj Party
14	Misrikh (SC)	Ashok Kumar Rawat	Bahujan Samaj Party
15	Hardoi (SC)	Usha Verma	Samajwadi Party
16	Lucknow	Atal Bihari Vajpayee	Bharatiya Janata Party
17	Mohanlalganj (SC)	Jai Prakash	Samajwadi Party
18	Unnao	Brajesh Pathak	Bahujan Samaj Party
19	Rae Bareli	Sonia Gandhi (Resigned on 23.3.2006)	Indian National Congress
19	Rae Bareli	Sonia Gandhi (Elected on 15.5.2006)	Indian National Congress
20	Pratapgarh	Akshay Pratap Singh	Samajwadi Party
21	Amethi	Rahul Gandhi	Indian National Congress
22	Sultanpur	Mohd. Tahir Khan	Bahujan Samaj Party
23	Akbarpur (SC)	Mayawati (Resigned due to elected to rajya sabha on 5.7.2004)	Bahujan Samaj Party
23	Akbarpur (SC)	Shankhlal Majhi (Elected on 23.12.2004)	Samajwadi Party
24	Faizabad	Mitrasen	Bahujan Samaj Party
25	Bara Banki (SC)	Kamla Prasad	Bahujan Samaj Party
26	Kaiserganj	Beni Prasad Verma	Samajwadi Party
27	Bahraich	Rubab Sayda	Samajwadi Party
28	Balrampur	Brij Bhushan Sharan Singh	Bharatiya Janata Party
29	Gonda	Kirti Vardhan Singh	Samajwadi Party
30	Basti (SC)	Lal Mani Prasad	Bahujan Samaj Party
31	Domariaganj	Mohd. Muqueem	Bahujan Samaj Party
32	Khalilabad	Bhalchandra Yadava (Ceased on 28.1.2008)	Bahujan Samaj Party
32	Khalilabad	Bhishma Shankar Tiwari (Elected on 16.4.2008)	Bahujan Samaj Party
33	Bansgaon (SC)	Mahaveer Prasad	Indian National Congress
34	Gorakhpur	Yogi Adityanath	Bharatiya Janata Party
35	Maharajganj	Pankaj Choudhary	Bharatiya Janata Party
36	Padrauna	Baleshwar Yadav	National Loktantrik Party
37	Deoria	Mohan Singh	Samajwadi Party
38	Salempur	Harikeval Prasad	Samajwadi Party
39	Ballia	Chandra Shekhar (Died on 8.7.2007)	Samajwadi Janata Party
39	Ballia	Neeraj Shekhar (Elected on 2.1.2008)	Samajwadi Party
40	Ghosi	Chandradeo Prasad Rajbhar	Samajwadi Party
41	Azamgarh	Ramakant Yadav (Ceased on 28.1.2008)	Bahujan Samaj Party
41	Azamgarh	Akbar Ahmad (Elected on 16.4.2008)	Bahujan Samaj Party
42	Lalganj (SC)	Daroga Prasad Saroj	Samajwadi Party
43	Machlishahr	Umakant Yadav	Bahujan Samaj Party
44	Jaunpur	Parasnath Yadava	Samajwadi Party
45	Saidpur (SC)	Tufani Saroj	Samajwadi Party
46	Ghazipur	Afajal Ansari	Samajwadi Party
47	Chandauli	Kailash Nath Singh Yadav	Bahujan Samaj Party
48	Varanasi	Rajesh Kumar Mishra	Indian National Congress
49	Robertsganj (SC)	Lal Chandra Kol (Expelled on 23.12.2005)	Bahujan Samaj Party
49	Robertsganj (SC)	Bhai Lal (Elected on 11.5.2007)	Bahujan Samaj Party
50	Mirzapur	Narendra Kushwaha (Expelled on 23.12.2005)	Bahujan Samaj Party
50	Mirzapur	Ramesh Dube (Elected on 11.5.2007)	Bahujan Samaj Party
51	Phulpur	Ateeq Ahamad	Samajwadi Party
52	Allahabad	Rewati Raman Singh	Samajwadi Party
53	Chail (SC)	Shailendra Kumar	Samajwadi Party
54	Fatehpur	Mahendra Prasad Nishad	Bahujan Samaj Party
55	Banda	Shyama Charan Gupta	Samajwadi Party
56	Hamirpur	Rajnarayan Budholiya	Samajwadi Party
57	Jhansi	Chandrapal Singh Yadav	Samajwadi Party
58	Jalaun (SC)	Bhanu Pratap Singh Verma	Bharatiya Janata Party
59	Ghatampur (SC)	Radhey Shyam Kori	Samajwadi Party
60	Bilhaur	Raja Ram Pal (Expelled on 23.12.2005)	Bahujan Samaj Party
60	Bilhaur	Anil Shukla Warsi (Elected on 11.5.2007)	Bahujan Samaj Party
61	Kanpur	Shriprakash Jaiswal	Indian National Congress
62	Etawah	Raghuraj Singh Shakya	Samajwadi Party
63	Kannauj	Akhilesh Yadav	Samajwadi Party
64	Farrukhabad	Chandra Bhushan Singh (Munnoo Babu)	Samajwadi Party
65	Mainpuri	Mulayam Singh Yadav (Resigned in May 2004)	Samajwadi Party
65	Mainpuri	Dharmendra Yadav (Elected on 23.12.2004)	Samajwadi Party
66	Jalesar	Pro. S.P Singh Baghel	Samajwadi Party
67	Etah	Ku. Devendra Singh Yadav	Samajwadi Party
68	Firozabad (SC)	Ram Ji Lal Suman	Samajwadi Party
69	Agra	Raj Babbar	Samajwadi Party
70	Mathura	Manvendra Singh	Indian National Congress
71	Hathras (SC)	Kishan Lal Diler	Bharatiya Janata Party
72	Aligarh	Bijendra Singh	Indian National Congress
73	Khurja (SC)	Ashok Kumar Pradhan	Bharatiya Janata Party
74	Bulandshahr	Kalyan Singh	Bharatiya Janata Party
75	Hapur	Surendra Prakash Goyal	Indian National Congress
76	Meerut	Mohd. Shahid	Bahujan Samaj Party
77	Baghpat	Ajit Singh	Rashtriya Lok Dal
78	Muzaffarnagar	Munawwar Hasan	Samajwadi Party
79	Kairana	Anuradha Choudhary	Rashtriya Lok Dal
80	Saharanpur	Rasheed Masood	Samajwadi Party

== Uttarakhand ==
Keys:

- BJP (2)
- INC (2)
- SP (1)

No.	Constituency	Name of elected M.P.	Party affiliation
1	Tehri Garhwal	Manabendra Shah (Died on 5.1.2007)	Bharatiya Janata Party
1	Tehri Garhwal	Vijay Bahuguna (Elected on 27.2.2007)	Indian National Congress
2	Garhwal	Bhuwan Chandra Khanduri	Bharatiya Janata Party
3	Almora	Bachi Singh Rawat	Bharatiya Janata Party
4	Nainital	Karan Chand Singh Baba	Indian National Congress
5	Haridwar (SC)	Rajendra Kumar Badi	Samajwadi Party

== West Bengal ==
Keys:

- CPI(M) (26)
- INC (6)
- CPI (3)
- AIFB (3)
- RSP (3)
- AITC (1)

No.	Constituency	Name of elected M.P.	Party affiliation
1	Cooch Behar (SC)	Hiten Barman	All India Forward Bloc
2	Alipurduars (ST)	Joachim Baxla	Revolutionary Socialist Party (India)
3	Jalpaiguri	Minati Sen	Communist Party of India (Marxist)
4	Darjeeling	Dawa Narbula	Indian National Congress
5	Raiganj	Priya Ranjan Dasmunsi	Indian National Congress
6	Balurghat (SC)	Ranen Barman	Revolutionary Socialist Party (India)
7	Malda	A. B. A. Ghani Khan Choudhury (Died on 14.4.2006)	Indian National Congress
7	Malda	Abu Hasem Khan Choudhury (Elected on 19.9.2006)	Indian National Congress
8	Jangipur	Pranab Mukherjee	Indian National Congress
9	Murshidabad	Abdul Mannan Hossain	Indian National Congress
10	Behrampore	Adhir Ranjan Chowdhury	Indian National Congress
11	Krishnanagar	Jyotirmoyee Sikdar	Communist Party of India (Marxist)
12	Nabadwip (SC)	Alakesh Das	Communist Party of India (Marxist)
13	Barasat	Subrata Bose	All India Forward Bloc
14	Basirhat	Ajay Chakraborty	Communist Party of India
15	Jaynagar (SC)	Sanat Kumar Mandal	Revolutionary Socialist Party (India)
16	Mathurapur (SC)	Basudeb Barman	Communist Party of India (Marxist)
17	Diamond Harbour	Samik Lahiri	Communist Party of India (Marxist)
18	Jadavpur	Sujan Chakraborty	Communist Party of India (Marxist)
19	Barrackpore	Tarit Baran Topdar	Communist Party of India (Marxist)
20	Dum Dum	Amitava Nandy	Communist Party of India (Marxist)
21	Calcutta North West	Sudhangshu Seal	Communist Party of India (Marxist)
22	Calcutta North East	Mohammed Salim	Communist Party of India (Marxist)
23	Calcutta South	Mamata Banerjee	Trinamool Congress
24	Howrah	Swadesh Chakrabortty	Communist Party of India (Marxist)
25	Uluberia	Hannan Mollah	Communist Party of India (Marxist)
26	Serampore	Santasri Chatterjee	Communist Party of India (Marxist)
27	Hooghly	Rupchand Pal	Communist Party of India (Marxist)
28	Arambagh	Anil Basu	Communist Party of India (Marxist)
29	Panskura	Gurudas Dasgupta	Communist Party of India
30	Tamluk	Lakshman Chandra Seth	Communist Party of India (Marxist)
31	Contai	Prasanta Pradhan	Communist Party of India (Marxist)
32	Midnapore	Prabodh Panda	Communist Party of India
33	Jhargram (ST)	Rupchand Murmu	Communist Party of India (Marxist)
34	Purulia	Bir Singh Mahato (Resigned on 30.5.2006)	All India Forward Bloc
34	Purulia	Narahari Mahato (Elected on 19.9.2006)	All India Forward Bloc
35	Bankura	Acharia Basudeb	Communist Party of India (Marxist)
36	Vishnupur (SC)	Susmita Bauri	Communist Party of India (Marxist)
37	Durgapur (SC)	Sunil Khan	Communist Party of India (Marxist)
38	Asansol	Bikash Chowdhury (Died on 1.8.2005)	Communist Party of India (Marxist)
38	Asansol	Bansa Gopal Chowdhury (Elected on 4.10.2005)	Communist Party of India (Marxist)
39	Burdwan	Nikhilananda Sar	Communist Party of India (Marxist)
40	Katwa	Mahboob Zahedi (Died on 8.4.2006)	Communist Party of India (Marxist)
40	Katwa	Abu Ayesh Mondal (Elected on 19.9.2006)	Communist Party of India (Marxist)
41	Bolpur	Somnath Chatterjee	Communist Party of India (Marxist)
42	Birbhum (SC)	Ram Chandra Dome	Communist Party of India (Marxist)

== Andaman and Nicobar Islands ==
Keys:

- INC (1)

No.	Constituency	Name of elected M.P.	Party affiliation
1	Andaman and Nicobar Islands	Manoranjan Bhakta	Indian National Congress

== Chandigarh ==
Keys:

- INC (1)

No.	Constituency	Name of elected M.P.	Party affiliation
1	Chandigarh	Pawan Kumar Bansal	Indian National Congress

== Dadra and Nagar Haveli ==
Keys:

- BNP (1)

No.	Constituency	Name of elected M.P.	Party affiliation
1	Dadra and Nagar Haveli (ST)	Delkar Mohanbhai Sanjibhai	Bharatiya Navshakti Party

== Daman and Diu ==
Keys:

- INC (1)

No.	Constituency	Name of elected M.P.	Party affiliation
1	Daman and Diu	Dahyabhai Vallabhbhai Patel	Indian National Congress

== National Capital Territory of Delhi ==
Keys:

- INC (6)
- BJP (1)

No.	Constituency	Name of elected M.P.	Party affiliation
1	New Delhi	Ajay Maken	Indian National Congress
2	South Delhi	Vijay Malhotra	Bharatiya Janata Party
3	Outer Delhi	Sajjan Kumar	Indian National Congress
4	East Delhi	Sandeep Dikshit	Indian National Congress
5	Chandni Chowk	Kapil Sibal	Indian National Congress
6	Delhi Sadar	Jagdish Tytler	Indian National Congress
7	Karol Bagh (SC)	Krishna Tirath	Indian National Congress

== Lakshadweep ==
Keys:

- JD(U) (1)

No.	Constituency	Name of elected M.P.	Party affiliation
1	Lakshadweep (ST)	P. Pookunhikoya	Janata Dal (United)

== Puducherry ==
Keys:

- PMK (1)

No.	Constituency	Name of elected M.P.	Party affiliation
1	Puducherry	M. Ramadass	Pattali Makkal Katchi

== Nominated ==
Keys:

- INC (2)

No.	Constituency	Name of Nominated M.P.	Party affiliation
1	Anglo-Indian Community	Ingrid Mcleod	Indian National Congress
2	Anglo-Indian Community	Fanthome Francis	Indian National Congress

== See also ==
- List of members of the 13th Lok Sabha
- List of members of the 15th Lok Sabha
