= List of National Democratic Alliance candidates in the 2004 Indian general election =

NDA candidates in 2004 Indian lower house election

National Democratic Alliance (NDA) is an Indian political party coalition led by Bharatiya Janata Party (BJP). Following is the Lok Sabha constituencies-wise list of the National Democratic Alliance candidates for the 2004 Indian general election.

BJP is one of the two major political parties in India; the other being the Indian National Congress. BJP has formed pre-poll alliance with various parties and independent candidates to constitute the National Democratic Alliance. Of the 29 states and 7 union territories, BJP will be having alliance in states (Assam, Bihar, Jharkhand, Karnataka, Kerala, Maharashtra Nagaland, Punjab, Rajasthan, Tamil Nadu and Uttar Pradesh) and union territory (Puducherry) with regional political parties.

Together, NDA contested for all 543 constituency seats that will form the 14th Lok Sabha. BJP will form the highest share of NDA by contesting in constituencies; followed by other large parties like, JDU (33), AIADMK (33), TDP (33), AITC (31) and Shiv Sena (22).

== Lok Sabha 2004 general election ==
Constituents of National Democratic Alliance (pre-poll alliance)
| No. | Party | Alliance in states | Seats contested | Seats won | |
|---|---|---|---|---|---|
| 1 | Bharatiya Janata Party | All States and UTs | 364 | 138 | ▼44 |
| 2 | Janata Dal (United) | Bihar; Karnataka; Uttar Pradesh; Lakshadweep; Assam | 33 | 8 | ▼13 |
| 3 | Telugu Desam Party | Andhra Pradesh | 33 | 5 | ▼24 |
| 4 | All India Anna Dravida Munnetra Kazhagam | Tamil Nadu | 33 | 0 | ▼10 |
| 5 | All India Trinamool Congress | West Bengal; Meghalaya; Tripura | 31 | 2 | ▼6 |
| 6 | Shiv Sena | Maharashtra | 22 | 12 | ▼3 |
| 7 | Biju Janata Dal | Orissa | 12 | 11 | ▲1 |
| 8 | Shiromani Akali Dal | Punjab | 10 | 8 | ▲6 |
| 9 | Indian Federal Democratic Party | Kerala | 1 | 1 | Steady |
| 10 | Sikkim Democratic Front | Sikkim | 1 | 1 | Steady |
| 11 | Naga People's Front | Nagaland | 1 | 1 | ▲1 |
| 12 | Mizo National Front | Mizoram | 1 | 1 | ▲1 |
| 13 | Sansuma Khunggur Bwiswmuthiary (Independent candidate) supported by BJP | Assam | 1 | 1 | ▲1 |
| Total NDA Candidates | | | 543 | 189 | ▼90 |

== Andhra Pradesh ==
TDP (33) BJP (9)

| Constituency No. | Constituency | Reserved for (SC/ST/None) | Candidate | Party | Poll On | Result |
|---|---|---|---|---|---|---|
| 1 | Srikakulam | None | Kinjarapu Yerran Naidu | Telugu Desam Party | | Won |
| 2 | Parvathipuram | ST | Dadichiluka Veera Gouri Sankara Rao | Telugu Desam Party | | Lost |
| 3 | Bobbili | None | Kondapalli Pydithalli Naidu | Telugu Desam Party | | Won |
| 4 | Visakhapatnam | None | M. V. V. S. Murthi | Telugu Desam Party | | Lost |
| 5 | Bhadrachalam | ST | K.P.R.K Phaneeswaramma | Telugu Desam Party | | Lost |
| 6 | Anakapalli | None | Pappala Chalapathirao | Telugu Desam Party | | Won |
| 7 | Kakinada | None | Mudragada Padmanabham | Telugu Desam Party | | Lost |
| 8 | Rajahmundry | None | Kantipudi Sarvarayudu | Bharatiya Janata Party | | Lost |
| 9 | Amalapuram | SC | Dunna Janardhana Rao | Telugu Desam Party | | Lost |
| 10 | Narasapur | None | U. V. Krishnam Raju | Bharatiya Janata Party | | Lost |
| 11 | Eluru | None | Bolla Bulli Ramaiah | Telugu Desam Party | | Lost |
| 12 | Machilipatnam | None | Ambati Brahmanaiah | Telugu Desam Party | | Lost |
| 13 | Vijayawada | None | C. Aswani Dutt | Telugu Desam Party | | Lost |
| 14 | Tenali | None | Ummareddy Venkateswarlu | Telugu Desam Party | | Lost |
| 15 | Guntur | None | Yemparala Venkateswara Rao | Telugu Desam Party | | Lost |
| 16 | Bapatla | None | Daggubati Ramanaidu | Telugu Desam Party | | Lost |
| 17 | Narasaraopet | None | Maddi Lakshmaiah | Telugu Desam Party | | Lost |
| 18 | Ongole | None | Bathula Vijaya Bharathi | Telugu Desam Party | | Lost |
| 19 | Nellore | SC | Balakondaiah Karupotala | Bharatiya Janata Party | | Lost |
| 20 | Tirupathi | SC | Nandipaku Venkataswamy | Bharatiya Janata Party | | Lost |
| 21 | Chittoor | None | D.K. Audikesavulu | Telugu Desam Party | | Won |
| 22 | Rajampet | None | Gunipati Ramaiah | Telugu Desam Party | | Lost |
| 23 | Cuddapah | None | M. V. Mysura Reddy | Telugu Desam Party | | Lost |
| 24 | Hindupur | None | B K Parthasarathi | Telugu Desam Party | | Lost |
| 25 | Anantapur | None | Kalava Srinivasulu | Telugu Desam Party | | Lost |
| 26 | Kurnool | None | K. E. Krishnamurthy | Telugu Desam Party | | Lost |
| 27 | Nandyal | None | Shobha Nagi Reddy | Telugu Desam Party | | Lost |
| 28 | Nagarkurnool | SC | Manda Jagannath | Telugu Desam Party | | Won |
| 29 | Mahabubnagar | None | Yelkoti Yella Reddy | Telugu Desam Party | | Lost |
| 30 | Hyderabad | None | G. Subash Chanderji | Bharatiya Janata Party | | Lost |
| 31 | Secunderabad | None | Bandaru Dattatreya | Bharatiya Janata Party | | Lost |
| 32 | Siddipet | SC | K.Lingaiah | Telugu Desam Party | | Lost |
| 33 | Medak | None | P.Ramachandra Reddy | Bharatiya Janata Party | | Lost |
| 34 | Nizamabad | None | Syed Yusuf Ali | Telugu Desam Party | | Lost |
| 35 | Adilabad | None | Samudrala Venugopal Chary | Telugu Desam Party | | Lost |
| 36 | Peddapalli | SC | Chellamalla Suguna Kumari | Telugu Desam Party | | Lost |
| 37 | Karimnagar | None | C. Vidyasagar Rao | Bharatiya Janata Party | | Lost |
| 38 | Hanamkonda | None | Chada Suresh Reddy | Telugu Desam Party | | Lost |
| 39 | Warangal | None | Bodakunti Venkateshwarlu | Telugu Desam Party | | Lost |
| 40 | Khammam | None | Nama Nageswara Rao | Telugu Desam Party | | Lost |
| 41 | Nalgonda | None | Nallu Indrasena Reddy | Bharatiya Janata Party | | Lost |
| 42 | Miryalguda | None | Vangala Swamy Goud | Telugu Desam Party | | Lost |

== Arunachal Pradesh ==
BJP (2)

| Constituency No. | Constituency | Reserved for (SC/ST/None) | Candidate | Party | Poll On | Result |
|---|---|---|---|---|---|---|
| 1 | Arunachal West | None | Kiren Rijiju | Bharatiya Janata Party | | Won |
| 2 | Arunachal East | None | Tapir Gao | Bharatiya Janata Party | | Won |

== Assam ==
BJP (12) JD(U) (1) IND (1)

| Constituency No. | Constituency | Reserved for (SC/ST/None) | Candidate | Party | Poll On | Result |
|---|---|---|---|---|---|---|
| 1 | Karimganj | SC | Parimal Suklabaidya | Bharatiya Janata Party | | Lost |
| 2 | Silchar | None | Kabindra Purkayastha | Bharatiya Janata Party | | Lost |
| 3 | Autonomous District | ST | Ratan Teron | Bharatiya Janata Party | | Lost |
| 4 | Dhubri | None | Jabeen Borbhuyan | Bharatiya Janata Party | | Lost |
| 5 | Kokrajhar | ST | Sansuma Khunggur Bwiswmuthiary | Independent | | Won |
| 6 | Barpeta | None | Ranjit Thakuria | Bharatiya Janata Party | | Lost |
| 7 | Gauhati | None | Bhupen Hazarika | Bharatiya Janata Party | | Lost |
| 8 | Mangaldoi | None | Narayan Chandra Borkataky | Bharatiya Janata Party | | Won |
| 9 | Tezpur | None | Ghisa Lal Agarwalla | Bharatiya Janata Party | | Lost |
| 10 | Nowgong | None | Rajen Gohain | Bharatiya Janata Party | | Won |
| 11 | Kaliabor | None | Rashidul Haque | Janata Dal (United) | | Lost |
| 12 | Jorhat | None | Dayananda Borgohain | Bharatiya Janata Party | | Lost |
| 13 | Dibrugarh | None | Kamakhya Prasad Tasa | Bharatiya Janata Party | | Lost |
| 14 | Lakhimpur | None | Uday Shankar Hazarika | Bharatiya Janata Party | | Lost |

== Bihar ==
JD(U) (24) BJP (16)

| Constituency No. | Constituency | Reserved for (SC/ST/None) | Candidate | Party | Poll On | Result |
|---|---|---|---|---|---|---|
| 1 | Bagaha | SC | Kailash Baitha | Janata Dal (United) | | Won |
| 2 | Bettiah | None | Madan Prasad Jaiswal | Bharatiya Janata Party | | Lost |
| 3 | Motihari | None | Radha Mohan Singh | Bharatiya Janata Party | | Lost |
| 4 | Gopalganj | None | Prabhu Dayal Singh | Janata Dal (United) | | Lost |
| 5 | Siwan | None | Om Prakash Yadav | Janata Dal (United) | | Lost |
| 6 | Maharajganj | None | Prabhunath Singh | Janata Dal (United) | | Won |
| 7 | Chapra | None | Rajiv Pratap Rudy | Bharatiya Janata Party | | Lost |
| 8 | Hajipur | SC | Chhedi Paswan | Janata Dal (United) | | Lost |
| 9 | Vaishali | None | Harendra Kumar | Janata Dal (United) | | Lost |
| 10 | Muzaffarpur | None | George Fernandes | Janata Dal (United) | | Won |
| 11 | Sitamarhi | None | Nawal Kishore Rai | Janata Dal (United) | | Lost |
| 12 | Sheohar | None | Mohammad Anwarul Haque | Bharatiya Janata Party | | Lost |
| 13 | Madhubani | None | Hukmdev Narayan Yadav | Bharatiya Janata Party | | Lost |
| 14 | Jhanjharpur | None | Jagannath Mishra | Janata Dal (United) | | Lost |
| 15 | Darbhanga | None | Kirti Azad | Bharatiya Janata Party | | Lost |
| 16 | Rosera | SC | Dasai Chowdhary | Janata Dal (United) | | Lost |
| 17 | Samastipur | None | Ram Chandra Singh | Janata Dal (United) | | Lost |
| 18 | Barh | None | Nitish Kumar | Janata Dal (United) | | Lost |
| 19 | Balia | None | Ram Jeevan Singh | Janata Dal (United) | | Lost |
| 20 | Saharsa | None | Dinesh Chandra Yadav | Janata Dal (United) | | Lost |
| 21 | Madhepura | None | Sharad Yadav | Janata Dal (United) | | Lost |
| 22 | Araria | SC | Sukdeo Paswan | Bharatiya Janata Party | | Won |
| 23 | Kishanganj | None | Syed Shahnawaz Hussain | Bharatiya Janata Party | | Lost |
| 24 | Purnea | None | Uday Singh | Bharatiya Janata Party | | Won |
| 25 | Katihar | None | Nikhil Kumar Choudhary | Bharatiya Janata Party | | Won |
| 26 | Banka | None | Digvijay Singh | Janata Dal (United) | | Lost |
| 27 | Bhagalpur | None | Sushil Kumar Modi | Bharatiya Janata Party | | Won |
| 28 | Khagaria | None | Renu Kumari Singh | Janata Dal (United) | | Lost |
| 29 | Monghyr | None | Monazir Hassan | Janata Dal (United) | | Lost |
| 30 | Begusarai | None | Rajiv Ranjan Singh | Janata Dal (United) | | Won |
| 31 | Nalanda | None | Nitish Kumar | Janata Dal (United) | | Won |
| 32 | Patna | None | C. P. Thakur | Bharatiya Janata Party | | Lost |
| 33 | Arrah | None | Ashok Kumar Verma | Janata Dal (United) | | Lost |
| 34 | Buxar | None | Lalmuni Chaubey | Bharatiya Janata Party | | Won |
| 35 | Sasaram | SC | Muni Lall | Bharatiya Janata Party | | Lost |
| 36 | Bikramganj | None | Ajit Kumar Singh | Janata Dal (United) | | Won |
| 37 | Aurangabad | None | Sushil Kumar Singh | Janata Dal (United) | | Lost |
| 38 | Jahanabad | None | Arun Kumar | Janata Dal (United) | | Lost |
| 39 | Nawada | SC | Sanjay Paswan | Bharatiya Janata Party | | Lost |
| 40 | Gaya | SC | Balbir Chand | Bharatiya Janata Party | | Lost |

== Chhattisgarh ==
BJP (11)

| Constituency No. | Constituency | Reserved for (SC/ST/None) | Candidate | Party | Poll On | Result |
|---|---|---|---|---|---|---|
| 1 | Surguja | ST | Nand Kumar Sai | Bharatiya Janata Party | | Won |
| 2 | Raigarh | ST | Vishnu Deo Sai | Bharatiya Janata Party | | Won |
| 3 | Janjgir | None | Karuna Shukla | Bharatiya Janata Party | | Won |
| 4 | Bilaspur | SC | Punnulal Mohle | Bharatiya Janata Party | | Won |
| 5 | Sarangarh | SC | Guharam Ajgalle | Bharatiya Janata Party | | Won |
| 6 | Raipur | None | Ramesh Bais | Bharatiya Janata Party | | Won |
| 7 | Mahasamund | None | Vidya Charan Shukla | Bharatiya Janata Party | | Lost |
| 8 | Kanker | ST | Sohan Potai | Bharatiya Janata Party | | Won |
| 9 | Bastar | ST | Baliram Kashyap | Bharatiya Janata Party | | Won |
| 10 | Durg | None | Tarachand Sahu | Bharatiya Janata Party | | Won |
| 11 | Rajnandgaon | None | Pradeep Gandhi | Bharatiya Janata Party | | Won |

== Goa ==
BJP (2)

| Constituency No. | Constituency | Reserved for (SC/ST/None) | Candidate | Party | Poll On | Result |
|---|---|---|---|---|---|---|
| 1 | Panaji | None | Shripad Yesso Naik | Bharatiya Janata Party | | Won |
| 2 | Mormugao | None | Ramakant Angle | Bharatiya Janata Party | | Lost |

== Gujarat ==
BJP (26)

| Constituency No. | Constituency | Reserved for (SC/ST/None) | Candidate | Party | Poll On | Result |
|---|---|---|---|---|---|---|
| 1 | Kutch | None | Pushpdan Gadhavi | Bharatiya Janata Party | | Won |
| 2 | Surendranagar | None | Somabhai Gandalal Koli Patel | Bharatiya Janata Party | | Won |
| 3 | Jamnagar | None | Chandresh Patel Kordia | Bharatiya Janata Party | | Lost |
| 4 | Rajkot | None | Vallabhbhai Kathiria | Bharatiya Janata Party | | Won |
| 5 | Porbandar | None | Harilal Patel | Bharatiya Janata Party | | Won |
| 6 | Junagadh | None | Bhavna Chikhalia | Bharatiya Janata Party | | Lost |
| 7 | Amreli | None | Dileep Sanghani | Bharatiya Janata Party | | Lost |
| 8 | Bhavnagar | None | Rajendrasinh Rana | Bharatiya Janata Party | | Won |
| 9 | Dhandhuka | SC | Ratilal Varma | Bharatiya Janata Party | | Won |
| 10 | Ahmedabad | None | Harin Pathak | Bharatiya Janata Party | | Won |
| 11 | Gandhinagar | None | L. K. Advani | Bharatiya Janata Party | | Won |
| 12 | Mehsana | None | Nitinbhai Patel | Bharatiya Janata Party | | Lost |
| 13 | Patan | SC | Mahesh Kanodia | Bharatiya Janata Party | | Won |
| 14 | Banaskantha | None | Haribhai Parthibhai Chaudhary | Bharatiya Janata Party | | Lost |
| 15 | Sabarkantha | None | Ramilaben Bara | Bharatiya Janata Party | | Lost |
| 16 | Kapadvanj | None | Liladhar Vaghela | Bharatiya Janata Party | | Lost |
| 17 | Dohad | ST | Babubhai Khimabhai Katara | Bharatiya Janata Party | | Won |
| 18 | Godhra | None | Bhupendrasinh Solanki | Bharatiya Janata Party | | Won |
| 19 | Kaira | None | Shubhanginiraje Ranjitsinh Gaekwad | Bharatiya Janata Party | | Lost |
| 20 | Anand | None | Jayprakash Vaghajibhai Patel | Bharatiya Janata Party | | Lost |
| 21 | Chhota Udaipur | ST | Ramsinh Rathwa | Bharatiya Janata Party | | Lost |
| 22 | Baroda | None | Jayaben Thakkar | Bharatiya Janata Party | | Won |
| 23 | Broach | None | Mansukhbhai Vasava | Bharatiya Janata Party | | Won |
| 24 | Surat | None | Kashiram Rana | Bharatiya Janata Party | | Won |
| 25 | Mandvi | ST | Mansinh Patel | Bharatiya Janata Party | | Lost |
| 26 | Bulsar | ST | Manibhai Chaudhary | Bharatiya Janata Party | | Lost |

== Haryana ==
BJP (10)

| Constituency No. | Constituency | Reserved for (SC/ST/None) | Candidate | Party | Poll On | Result |
|---|---|---|---|---|---|---|
| 1 | Ambala | SC | Rattan Lal Kataria | Bharatiya Janata Party | | Lost |
| 2 | Kurukshetra | None | Gurdayal Singh Saini | Bharatiya Janata Party | | Lost |
| 3 | Karnal | None | Ishwar Dayal Swami | Bharatiya Janata Party | | Lost |
| 4 | Sonepat | None | Kishan Singh Sangwan | Bharatiya Janata Party | | Won |
| 5 | Rohtak | None | Captain Abhimanyu | Bharatiya Janata Party | | Lost |
| 6 | Faridabad | None | Ram Chander Bainda | Bharatiya Janata Party | | Lost |
| 7 | Mahendragarh | None | Sudha Yadav | Bharatiya Janata Party | | Lost |
| 8 | Bhiwani | None | Ram Bilas Sharma | Bharatiya Janata Party | | Lost |
| 9 | Hisar | None | Swami Raghvanand | Bharatiya Janata Party | | Lost |
| 10 | Sirsa | SC | Mahavir Parshad | Bharatiya Janata Party | | Lost |

== Himachal Pradesh ==
BJP (4)

| Constituency No. | Constituency | Reserved for (SC/ST/None) | Candidate | Party | Poll On | Result |
|---|---|---|---|---|---|---|
| 1 | Simla | SC | Hira Nand Kashyap | Bharatiya Janata Party | | Lost |
| 2 | Mandi | None | Maheshwar Singh | Bharatiya Janata Party | | Lost |
| 3 | Kangra | None | Shanta Kumar | Bharatiya Janata Party | | Lost |
| 4 | Hamirpur | None | Suresh Chandel | Bharatiya Janata Party | | Won |

== Jammu and Kashmir ==
BJP (6)

| Constituency No. | Constituency | Reserved for (SC/ST/None) | Candidate | Party | Poll On | Result |
|---|---|---|---|---|---|---|
| 1 | Baramulla | None | Mohmad Akbar | Bharatiya Janata Party | | Lost |
| 2 | Srinagar | None | Iftikhar Sadiq | Bharatiya Janata Party | | Lost |
| 3 | Anantnag | None | Sofi Mohf. Yousuf | Bharatiya Janata Party | | Lost |
| 4 | Ladakh | None | Sonam Palzor | Bharatiya Janata Party | | Lost |
| 5 | Udhampur | None | Chaman Lal Gupta | Bharatiya Janata Party | | Lost |
| 6 | Jammu | None | Nirmal Kumar Singh | Bharatiya Janata Party | | Lost |

== Jharkhand ==
BJP (14)

| Constituency No. | Constituency | Reserved for (SC/ST/None) | Candidate | Party | Poll On | Result |
|---|---|---|---|---|---|---|
| 1 | Rajmahal | ST | Som Marandi | Bharatiya Janata Party | | Lost |
| 2 | Dumka | ST | Sone Lal Hembrom | Bharatiya Janata Party | | Lost |
| 3 | Godda | None | Pradeep Yadav | Bharatiya Janata Party | | Lost |
| 4 | Chatra | None | Nagmani Kushwaha | Bharatiya Janata Party | | Lost |
| 5 | Kodarma | None | Babulal Marandi | Bharatiya Janata Party | | Won |
| 6 | Giridih | None | Ravindra Kumar Pandey | Bharatiya Janata Party | | Lost |
| 7 | Dhanbad | None | Rita Verma | Bharatiya Janata Party | | Lost |
| 8 | Ranchi | None | Ram Tahal Choudhary | Bharatiya Janata Party | | Lost |
| 9 | Jamshedpur | None | Abha Mahato | Bharatiya Janata Party | | Lost |
| 10 | Singhbhum | ST | Laxman Giluwa | Bharatiya Janata Party | | Lost |
| 11 | Khunti | ST | Kariya Munda | Bharatiya Janata Party | | Lost |
| 12 | Lohardaga | ST | Dukha Bhagat | Bharatiya Janata Party | | Lost |
| 13 | Palamau | SC | Braj Mohan Ram | Bharatiya Janata Party | | Lost |
| 14 | Hazaribagh | None | Yashwant Sinha | Bharatiya Janata Party | | Lost |

== Karnataka ==
BJP (24) JD(U) (4)

| Constituency No. | Constituency | Reserved for (SC/ST/None) | Candidate | Party | Poll On | Result |
|---|---|---|---|---|---|---|
| 1 | Bidar | SC | Ramchandra Veerappa | Bharatiya Janata Party | | Won |
| 2 | Gulbarga | None | Basavaraj Patil Sedam | Bharatiya Janata Party | | Lost |
| 3 | Raichur | None | Kallur Suresh Reddy | Bharatiya Janata Party | | Lost |
| 4 | Koppal | None | Nagappa Saloni | Bharatiya Janata Party | | Lost |
| 5 | Bellary | None | G. Karunakara Reddy | Bharatiya Janata Party | | Won |
| 6 | Davanagere | None | G. M. Siddeshwara | Bharatiya Janata Party | | Won |
| 7 | Chitradurga | None | C. P. Mudalagiriyappa | Bharatiya Janata Party | | Lost |
| 8 | Tumkur | None | S. Mallikarjunaiah | Bharatiya Janata Party | | Won |
| 9 | Chikballapur | None | Ashok Krishnappa | Janata Dal (United) | | Lost |
| 10 | Kolar | SC | D S Veeraiah | Bharatiya Janata Party | | Lost |
| 11 | Kanakapura | None | Ramachandra Gowda | Bharatiya Janata Party | | Lost |
| 12 | Bangalore North | None | H. T. Sangliana | Bharatiya Janata Party | | Won |
| 13 | Bangalore South | None | Ananth Kumar | Bharatiya Janata Party | | Won |
| 14 | Mandya | None | K S Jayaram | Janata Dal (United) | | Lost |
| 15 | Chamarajanagar | SC | N Chamaraju | Janata Dal (United) | | Lost |
| 16 | Mysore | None | C. H. Vijayashankar | Bharatiya Janata Party | | Won |
| 17 | Mangalore | None | D. V. Sadananda Gowda | Bharatiya Janata Party | | Won |
| 18 | Udupi | None | Manorama Madhwaraj | Bharatiya Janata Party | | Won |
| 19 | Hassan | None | H. N. Nanje Gowda | Janata Dal (United) | | Lost |
| 20 | Chikmagalur | None | D. C. Srikantappa | Bharatiya Janata Party | | Won |
| 21 | Shimoga | None | Sarekoppa Bangarappa | Bharatiya Janata Party | | Won |
| 22 | Kanara | None | Anant Kumar Hegde | Bharatiya Janata Party | | Won |
| 23 | Dharwad South | None | Manjunath Kunnur | Bharatiya Janata Party | | Won |
| 24 | Dharwad North | None | Pralhad Joshi | Bharatiya Janata Party | | Won |
| 25 | Belgaum | None | Suresh Angadi | Bharatiya Janata Party | | Won |
| 26 | Chikkodi | SC | Ramesh Jigajinagi | Bharatiya Janata Party | | Won |
| 27 | Bagalkot | None | P. C. Gaddigoudar | Bharatiya Janata Party | | Won |
| 28 | Bijapur | None | Basangouda Patil Yatnal | Bharatiya Janata Party | | Won |

== Kerala ==
BJP (19) IFDP (1)

| Constituency No. | Constituency | Reserved for (SC/ST/None) | Candidate | Party | Poll On | Result |
|---|---|---|---|---|---|---|
| 1 | Kasaragod | None | Adv V Balakrishna Shetty | Bharatiya Janata Party | | Lost |
| 2 | Cannanore | None | O K Vasu Master | Bharatiya Janata Party | | Lost |
| 3 | Badagara | None | K. P. Sreesan | Bharatiya Janata Party | | Lost |
| 4 | Calicut | None | M. T. Ramesh | Bharatiya Janata Party | | Lost |
| 5 | Manjeri | None | Uma Unni | Bharatiya Janata Party | | Lost |
| 6 | Ponnani | None | Aravindan | Bharatiya Janata Party | | Lost |
| 7 | Palghat | None | C. Udai Bhasker | Bharatiya Janata Party | | Lost |
| 8 | Ottapalam | SC | Velayudhan | Bharatiya Janata Party | | Lost |
| 9 | Trichur | None | P. S. Sreeraman | Bharatiya Janata Party | | Lost |
| 10 | Mukundapuram | None | Mathew Pailee | Bharatiya Janata Party | | Lost |
| 11 | Ernakulam | None | O. G. Thankappan | Bharatiya Janata Party | | Lost |
| 12 | Muvattupuzha | None | P. C. Thomas | Indian Federal Democratic Party | | Won |
| 13 | Kottayam | None | B. Radhakrishna Menon | Bharatiya Janata Party | | Lost |
| 14 | Idukki | None | S. T. B. Mohandas | Bharatiya Janata Party | | Lost |
| 15 | Alleppey | None | V. Padmanabhan | Bharatiya Janata Party | | Lost |
| 16 | Mavelikara | None | S. Krishna Kumar | Bharatiya Janata Party | | Lost |
| 17 | Adoor | SC | P. M. Velayudhan | Bharatiya Janata Party | | Lost |
| 18 | Quilon | None | Kizhakkanela Sudhakaran | Bharatiya Janata Party | | Lost |
| 19 | Chirayinkil | None | J. R. Padmakumar | Bharatiya Janata Party | | Lost |
| 20 | Trivandrum | None | O. Rajagopal | Bharatiya Janata Party | | Lost |

== Madhya Pradesh ==
BJP (29)

| Constituency No. | Constituency | Reserved for (SC/ST/None) | Candidate | Party | Poll On | Result |
|---|---|---|---|---|---|---|
| 1 | Morena | SC | Ashok Argal | Bharatiya Janata Party | | Won |
| 2 | Bhind | None | Ram Lakhan Singh | Bharatiya Janata Party | | Won |
| 3 | Gwalior | None | Jaibhan Singh Pawaiya | Bharatiya Janata Party | | Lost |
| 4 | Guna | None | Harivallabh Shukla | Bharatiya Janata Party | | Lost |
| 5 | Sagar | SC | Virendra Kumar | Bharatiya Janata Party | | Won |
| 6 | Khajuraho | None | Ramkrishna Kusmaria | Bharatiya Janata Party | | Won |
| 7 | Damoh | None | Chandrabhan Bhaiya | Bharatiya Janata Party | | Won |
| 8 | Satna | None | Ganesh Singh | Bharatiya Janata Party | | Won |
| 9 | Rewa | None | Chandramani Tripathi | Bharatiya Janata Party | | Won |
| 10 | Sidhi | ST | Chandrapratap Singh | Bharatiya Janata Party | | Won |
| 11 | Shahdol | ST | Dalpat Singh Paraste | Bharatiya Janata Party | | Won |
| 12 | Balaghat | None | Gaurishankar Bisen | Bharatiya Janata Party | | Won |
| 13 | Mandla | ST | Faggan Singh Kulaste | Bharatiya Janata Party | | Won |
| 14 | Jabalpur | None | Rakesh Singh | Bharatiya Janata Party | | Won |
| 15 | Seoni | None | Neeta Pateriya | Bharatiya Janata Party | | Won |
| 16 | Chhindwara | None | Prahlad Singh Patel | Bharatiya Janata Party | | Lost |
| 17 | Betul | None | Vijay Kumar Khandelwal | Bharatiya Janata Party | | Won |
| 18 | Hoshangabad | None | Sartaj Singh | Bharatiya Janata Party | | Won |
| 19 | Bhopal | None | Kailash Joshi | Bharatiya Janata Party | | Won |
| 20 | Vidisha | None | Shivraj Singh Chouhan | Bharatiya Janata Party | | Won |
| 21 | Rajgarh | None | Lakshman Singh | Bharatiya Janata Party | | Won |
| 22 | Shajapur | SC | Thawar Chand Gehlot | Bharatiya Janata Party | | Won |
| 23 | Khandwa | None | Nandkumar Singh Chauhan | Bharatiya Janata Party | | Won |
| 24 | Khargone | None | Krishna Murari Moghe | Bharatiya Janata Party | | Won |
| 25 | Dhar | ST | Chhatar Singh Darbar | Bharatiya Janata Party | | Won |
| 26 | Indore | None | Sumitra Mahajan | Bharatiya Janata Party | | Won |
| 27 | Ujjain | SC | Satyanarayan Jatiya | Bharatiya Janata Party | | Won |
| 28 | Jhabua | ST | Relam Chauhan | Bharatiya Janata Party | | Lost |
| 29 | Mandsaur | None | Laxminarayan Pandey | Bharatiya Janata Party | | Won |

== Maharashtra ==
BJP (26) SS (22)

| Constituency No. | Constituency | Reserved for (SC/ST/None) | Candidate | Party | Poll On | Result |
|---|---|---|---|---|---|---|
| 1 | Rajapur | None | Suresh Prabhu | Shiv Sena | | Won |
| 2 | Ratnagiri | None | Anant Geete | Shiv Sena | | Won |
| 3 | Kolaba | None | Shyam Sawant | Shiv Sena | | Lost |
| 4 | Mumbai South | None | Jayawantiben Mehta | Bharatiya Janata Party | | Lost |
| 5 | Mumbai South Central | None | Mohan Rawale | Shiv Sena | | Won |
| 6 | Mumbai North Central | None | Manohar Joshi | Shiv Sena | | Lost |
| 7 | Mumbai North East | None | Kirit Somaiya | Bharatiya Janata Party | | Lost |
| 8 | Mumbai North West | None | Sanjay Nirupam | Shiv Sena | | Lost |
| 9 | Mumbai North | None | Ram Naik | Bharatiya Janata Party | | Lost |
| 10 | Thane | None | Prakash Paranjape | Shiv Sena | | Won |
| 11 | Dahanu | ST | Chintaman Vanaga | Bharatiya Janata Party | | Lost |
| 12 | Nashik | None | Dashrath Patil | Shiv Sena | | Lost |
| 13 | Malegaon | ST | Harischandra Chavan | Bharatiya Janata Party | | Won |
| 14 | Dhule | ST | Ramdas Rupla Gavit | Bharatiya Janata Party | | Lost |
| 15 | Nandurbar | ST | Natawadkar Suhas Jayant | Bharatiya Janata Party | | Lost |
| 16 | Erandol | None | Annasaheb M. K. Patil | Bharatiya Janata Party | | Won |
| 17 | Jalgaon | None | Y. G. Mahajan | Bharatiya Janata Party | | Won |
| 18 | Buldhana | SC | Anandrao Vithoba Adsul | Shiv Sena | | Won |
| 19 | Akola | None | Sanjay Dhotre | Bharatiya Janata Party | | Won |
| 20 | Washim | None | Bhavana Gawali | Shiv Sena | | Won |
| 21 | Amravati | None | Anant Gudhe | Shiv Sena | | Won |
| 22 | Ramtek | None | Subodh Mohite | Shiv Sena | | Won |
| 23 | Nagpur | None | Atal Bahadur Singh | Bharatiya Janata Party | | Lost |
| 24 | Bhandara | None | Shishupal Patle | Bharatiya Janata Party | | Won |
| 25 | Chimur | None | Mahadeo Shivankar | Bharatiya Janata Party | | Won |
| 26 | Chandrapur | None | Hansraj Gangaram Ahir | Bharatiya Janata Party | | Won |
| 27 | Wardha | None | Suresh Wagmare | Bharatiya Janata Party | | Won |
| 28 | Yavatmal | None | Harising Nasaru Rathod | Bharatiya Janata Party | | Won |
| 29 | Hingoli | None | Shivaji Mane | Shiv Sena | | Lost |
| 30 | Nanded | None | Digamber Bapuji Patil | Bharatiya Janata Party | | Won |
| 31 | Parbhani | None | Tukaram Renge Patil | Shiv Sena | | Won |
| 32 | Jalna | None | Raosaheb Danve | Bharatiya Janata Party | | Won |
| 33 | Aurangabad | None | Chandrakant Khaire | Shiv Sena | | Won |
| 34 | Beed | None | Prakashdada Solanke | Bharatiya Janata Party | | Lost |
| 35 | Latur | None | Rupatai Patil | Bharatiya Janata Party | | Won |
| 36 | Osmanabad | SC | Kalpana Narhire | Shiv Sena | | Won |
| 37 | Sholapur | None | Subhash Sureshchandra Deshmukh | Bharatiya Janata Party | | Won |
| 38 | Pandharpur | SC | Nagnath Dattatray Kshirsagar | Bharatiya Janata Party | | Lost |
| 39 | Ahmednagar | None | N. S. Pharande | Bharatiya Janata Party | | Lost |
| 40 | Kopargaon | None | Murkute Bhanudas Kashinath | Shiv Sena | | Lost |
| 41 | Khed | None | Shivajirao Adhalarao Patil | Shiv Sena | | Won |
| 42 | Pune | None | Pradeep Rawat | Bharatiya Janata Party | | Lost |
| 43 | Baramati | None | Prithviraj Sahebrao Jachak | Bharatiya Janata Party | | Lost |
| 44 | Satara | None | Hindurao Naik Nimbalkar | Shiv Sena | | Lost |
| 45 | Karad | None | Mankumare Vasant Dnyandev | Shiv Sena | | Lost |
| 46 | Sangli | None | Deepak Mhaisalkar | Bharatiya Janata Party | | Lost |
| 47 | Ichalkaranji | None | Sanjay Shamrao Patil | Shiv Sena | | Lost |
| 48 | Kolhapur | None | Dhananjay Mahadik | Shiv Sena | | Lost |

== Manipur ==
BJP (2)

| Constituency No. | Constituency | Reserved for (SC/ST/None) | Candidate | Party | Poll On | Result |
|---|---|---|---|---|---|---|
| 1 | Inner Manipur | None | Thounaojam Chaoba Singh | Bharatiya Janata Party | | Lost |
| 2 | Outer Manipur | ST | D. Loli Adanee | Bharatiya Janata Party | | Lost |

== Meghalaya ==
AITC (1) BJP (1)

| Constituency No. | Constituency | Reserved for (SC/ST/None) | Candidate | Party | Poll On | Result |
|---|---|---|---|---|---|---|
| 1 | Shillong | None | Sanbor Swell Lyngdoh | Bharatiya Janata Party | | Lost |
| 2 | Tura | None | P. A. Sangma | All India Trinamool Congress | | Won |

== Mizoram ==
MNF (1)

| Constituency No. | Constituency | Reserved for (SC/ST/None) | Candidate | Party | Poll On | Result |
|---|---|---|---|---|---|---|
| 1 | Mizoram | ST | Vanlalzawma | Mizo National Front | | Won |

== Nagaland ==
NPF (1)

| Constituency No. | Constituency | Reserved for (SC/ST/None) | Candidate | Party | Poll On | Result |
|---|---|---|---|---|---|---|
| 1 | Nagaland | None | W. Wangyuh | Naga People's Front | | Won |

== Odisha ==
BJD (12) BJP (9)

| Constituency No. | Constituency | Reserved for (SC/ST/None) | Candidate | Party | Poll On | Result |
|---|---|---|---|---|---|---|
| 1 | Mayurbhanj | ST | Bhagirathi Majhi | Bharatiya Janata Party | | Lost |
| 2 | Balasore | None | Kharabela Swain | Bharatiya Janata Party | | Won |
| 3 | Bhadrak | SC | Arjun Charan Sethi | Biju Janata Dal | | Won |
| 4 | Jajpur | SC | Mohan Jena | Biju Janata Dal | | Won |
| 5 | Kendrapara | None | Archana Nayak | Biju Janata Dal | | Won |
| 6 | Cuttack | None | Bhartruhari Mahtab | Biju Janata Dal | | Won |
| 7 | Jagatsinghpur | None | Brahmananda Panda | Biju Janata Dal | | Won |
| 8 | Puri | None | Braja Kishore Tripathy | Biju Janata Dal | | Won |
| 9 | Bhubaneswar | None | Prasanna Kumar Patasani | Biju Janata Dal | | Won |
| 10 | Aska | None | Hari Har Swain | Biju Janata Dal | | Won |
| 11 | Berhampur | None | Anadi Charan Sahu | Bharatiya Janata Party | | Lost |
| 12 | Koraput | ST | Papanna Mutika | Biju Janata Dal | | Lost |
| 13 | Nowrangpur | ST | Parsuram Majhi | Bharatiya Janata Party | | Won |
| 14 | Kalahandi | None | Bikram Keshari Deo | Bharatiya Janata Party | | Won |
| 15 | Phulbani | SC | Sugrib Singh | Biju Janata Dal | | Won |
| 16 | Bolangir | None | Sangeeta Kumari Singh Deo | Bharatiya Janata Party | | Won |
| 17 | Sambalpur | None | Prasanna Acharya | Biju Janata Dal | | Won |
| 18 | Deogarh | None | Dharmendra Pradhan | Bharatiya Janata Party | | Won |
| 19 | Dhenkanal | None | Tathagata Satpathy | Biju Janata Dal | | Won |
| 20 | Sundargarh | ST | Jual Oram | Bharatiya Janata Party | | Won |
| 21 | Keonjhar | ST | Ananta Nayak | Bharatiya Janata Party | | Won |

== Punjab ==
SAD (10) BJP (3)

| Constituency No. | Constituency | Reserved for (SC/ST/None) | Candidate | Party | Poll On | Result |
|---|---|---|---|---|---|---|
| 1 | Gurdaspur | None | Vinod Khanna | Bharatiya Janata Party | | Won |
| 2 | Amritsar | None | Navjot Singh Sidhu | Bharatiya Janata Party | | Won |
| 3 | Tarn Taran | None | Rattan Singh Ajnala | Shiromani Akali Dal | | Won |
| 4 | Jullundur | None | Naresh Gujral | Shiromani Akali Dal | | Lost |
| 5 | Phillaur | SC | Charanjit Singh Atwal | Shiromani Akali Dal | | Won |
| 6 | Hoshiarpur | None | Avinash Rai Khanna | Bharatiya Janata Party | | Won |
| 7 | Ropar | SC | Sukhdev Singh Libra | Shiromani Akali Dal | | Won |
| 8 | Patiala | None | Kanwaljit Singh | Shiromani Akali Dal | | Lost |
| 9 | Ludhiana | None | Sharanjit Singh Dhillon | Shiromani Akali Dal | | Won |
| 10 | Sangrur | None | Sukhdev Singh Dhindsa | Shiromani Akali Dal | | Won |
| 11 | Bhatinda | SC | Paramjit Kaur Gulshan | Shiromani Akali Dal | | Won |
| 12 | Faridkot | None | Sukhbir Singh Badal | Shiromani Akali Dal | | Won |
| 13 | Ferozepur | None | Zora Singh Maan | Shiromani Akali Dal | | Won |

== Rajasthan ==
BJP (25)

| Constituency No. | Constituency | Reserved for (SC/ST/None) | Candidate | Party | Poll On | Result |
|---|---|---|---|---|---|---|
| 1 | Ganganagar | SC | Nihalchand Meghwal | Bharatiya Janata Party | | Won |
| 2 | Bikaner | None | Dharmendra | Bharatiya Janata Party | | Won |
| 3 | Churu | None | Ram Singh Kaswan | Bharatiya Janata Party | | Won |
| 4 | Jhunjhunu | GEN | Santosh Ahlawat | Bharatiya Janata Party | | Lost |
| 5 | Sikar | None | Subhash Maharia | Bharatiya Janata Party | | Won |
| 6 | Jaipur | None | Girdhari Lal Bhargava | Bharatiya Janata Party | | Won |
| 7 | Dausa | None | Kartar Singh Bhadana | Bharatiya Janata Party | | Lost |
| 8 | Alwar | None | Mahant Chandnath | Bharatiya Janata Party | | Lost |
| 9 | Bharatpur | None | Vishvendra Singh | Bharatiya Janata Party | | Won |
| 10 | Bayana | SC | Ramswaroop Koli | Bharatiya Janata Party | | Won |
| 11 | Sawai Madhopur | ST | Jaskaur Meena | Bharatiya Janata Party | | Lost |
| 12 | Ajmer | None | Rasa Singh Rawat | Bharatiya Janata Party | | Won |
| 13 | Tonk | SC | Kailash Meghwal | Bharatiya Janata Party | | Won |
| 14 | Kota | None | Raghuveer Singh Koshal | Bharatiya Janata Party | | Won |
| 15 | Jhalawar | None | Dushyant Singh | Bharatiya Janata Party | | Won |
| 16 | Banswara | ST | Dhan Singh Rawat | Bharatiya Janata Party | | Won |
| 17 | Salumber | ST | Mahaveer Bhagora | Bharatiya Janata Party | | Won |
| 18 | Udaipur | None | Kiran Maheshwari | Bharatiya Janata Party | | Won |
| 19 | Chittorgarh | None | Shrichand Kriplani | Bharatiya Janata Party | | Won |
| 20 | Bhilwara | None | V. P. Singh Badnore | Bharatiya Janata Party | | Won |
| 21 | Pali | None | Pusp Jain | Bharatiya Janata Party | | Won |
| 22 | Jalore | SC | Bangaru Susheela | Bharatiya Janata Party | | Won |
| 23 | Barmer | None | Manvendra Singh | Bharatiya Janata Party | | Won |
| 24 | Jodhpur | None | Jaswant Singh Bishnoi | Bharatiya Janata Party | | Won |
| 25 | Nagaur | None | Bhanwar Singh Dangawas | Bharatiya Janata Party | | Won |

== Sikkim ==
SDF (1)

| Constituency No. | Constituency | Reserved for (SC/ST/None) | Candidate | Party | Poll On | Result |
|---|---|---|---|---|---|---|
| 1 | Sikkim | None | Nakul Das Rai | Sikkim Democratic Front | | Won |

== Tamil Nadu ==
AIADMK (33) BJP (6)

| Constituency No. | Constituency | Reserved for (SC/ST/None) | Candidate | Party | Poll On | Result |
|---|---|---|---|---|---|---|
| 1 | Madras North | None | Sukumar Nambiar. M N | Bharatiya Janata Party | | Lost |
| 2 | Madras Central | None | Balaganga N | All India Anna Dravida Munnetra Kazhagam | | Lost |
| 3 | Madras South | None | Bader Sayeed | All India Anna Dravida Munnetra Kazhagam | | Lost |
| 4 | Sriperumbudur | SC | P. Venugopal | All India Anna Dravida Munnetra Kazhagam | | Lost |
| 5 | Chengalpattu | None | K.N. Ramachandra | All India Anna Dravida Munnetra Kazhagam | | Lost |
| 6 | Arakkonam | None | Shanmugam N. | All India Anna Dravida Munnetra Kazhagam | | Lost |
| 7 | Vellore | None | Santhanam. A | All India Anna Dravida Munnetra Kazhagam | | Lost |
| 8 | Tirupattur | None | Subramani. K. G | All India Anna Dravida Munnetra Kazhagam | | Lost |
| 9 | Vandavasi | None | R Rajalakshmi | All India Anna Dravida Munnetra Kazhagam | | Lost |
| 10 | Tindivanam | None | Arunmozhithevan. A | All India Anna Dravida Munnetra Kazhagam | | Lost |
| 11 | Cuddalore | None | Rajendran. R | All India Anna Dravida Munnetra Kazhagam | | Lost |
| 12 | Chidambaram | SC | Tada.D.Periyasamy | Bharatiya Janata Party | | Lost |
| 13 | Dharmapuri | None | P. D. Elangovan | Bharatiya Janata Party | | Lost |
| 14 | Krishnagiri | None | Nanje Gowdu. K | All India Anna Dravida Munnetra Kazhagam | | Lost |
| 15 | Rasipuram | SC | Anbalagan. S | All India Anna Dravida Munnetra Kazhagam | | Lost |
| 16 | Salem | None | Rajasekaran. A | All India Anna Dravida Munnetra Kazhagam | | Lost |
| 17 | Tiruchengode | None | Edappadi K. Palaniswami | All India Anna Dravida Munnetra Kazhagam | | Lost |
| 18 | Nilgiris | None | M Master Mathan | Bharatiya Janata Party | | Lost |
| 19 | Gobichettipalayam | None | N. R Govindarajar | All India Anna Dravida Munnetra Kazhagam | | Lost |
| 20 | Coimbatore | None | C. P. Radhakrishnan | Bharatiya Janata Party | | Lost |
| 21 | Pollachi | SC | Murugan. G | All India Anna Dravida Munnetra Kazhagam | | Lost |
| 22 | Palani | None | Kishore Kumar. K | All India Anna Dravida Munnetra Kazhagam | | Lost |
| 23 | Dindigul | None | Jeyaraman. M | All India Anna Dravida Munnetra Kazhagam | | Lost |
| 24 | Madurai | None | A. K. Bose | All India Anna Dravida Munnetra Kazhagam | | Lost |
| 25 | Periyakulam | None | T. T. V. Dhinakaran | All India Anna Dravida Munnetra Kazhagam | | Lost |
| 26 | Karur | None | Palanichamy Raja. N | All India Anna Dravida Munnetra Kazhagam | | Lost |
| 27 | Tiruchirappalli | None | M. Paranjothi | All India Anna Dravida Munnetra Kazhagam | | Lost |
| 28 | Perambalur | SC | M. Sundaram | All India Anna Dravida Munnetra Kazhagam | | Lost |
| 29 | Mayiladuthurai | None | O. S. Manian | All India Anna Dravida Munnetra Kazhagam | | Lost |
| 30 | Nagapattinam | SC | Archunan. P J | All India Anna Dravida Munnetra Kazhagam | | Lost |
| 31 | Thanjavur | None | Thangamuthu. K | All India Anna Dravida Munnetra Kazhagam | | Lost |
| 32 | Pudukkottai | None | Ravichandran. A | All India Anna Dravida Munnetra Kazhagam | | Lost |
| 33 | Sivaganga | None | Karuppiah. S P | All India Anna Dravida Munnetra Kazhagam | | Lost |
| 34 | Ramanathapuram | None | Murugesan. C | All India Anna Dravida Munnetra Kazhagam | | Lost |
| 35 | Sivakasi | None | Kannan. P | All India Anna Dravida Munnetra Kazhagam | | Lost |
| 36 | Tirunelveli | None | Amirtha Ganesan R | All India Anna Dravida Munnetra Kazhagam | | Lost |
| 37 | Tenkasi | SC | S. Murugesan | All India Anna Dravida Munnetra Kazhagam | | Lost |
| 38 | Tiruchendur | None | Thamodaran. T | All India Anna Dravida Munnetra Kazhagam | | Lost |
| 39 | Nagercoil | None | Pon Radhakrishnan | Bharatiya Janata Party | | Lost |

== Tripura ==
AITC (1) BJP (1)

| Constituency No. | Constituency | Reserved for (SC/ST/None) | Candidate | Party | Poll On | Result |
|---|---|---|---|---|---|---|
| 1 | Tripura West | None | Amar Mallik | All India Trinamool Congress | | Lost |
| 2 | Tripura East | ST | Pulin Behari Dewan | Bharatiya Janata Party | | Lost |

== Uttar Pradesh ==
BJP (77) JD(U) (3)

| Constituency No. | Constituency | Reserved for (SC/ST/None) | Candidate | Party | Poll On | Result |
|---|---|---|---|---|---|---|
| 1 | Bijnor | SC | Sheesh Ram Singh Ravi | Bharatiya Janata Party | | Lost |
| 2 | Amroha | None | Chetan Chauhan | Bharatiya Janata Party | | Lost |
| 3 | Moradabad | None | Chandra Vijay Singh | Bharatiya Janata Party | | Lost |
| 4 | Rampur | None | Rajendra Kumar Sharma | Bharatiya Janata Party | | Lost |
| 5 | Sambhal | None | Omveer Singh | Bharatiya Janata Party | | Lost |
| 6 | Budaun | None | Brijpal Singh Shakya | Bharatiya Janata Party | | Lost |
| 7 | Aonla | None | Kunwar Sarvraj Singh | Janata Dal (United) | | Won |
| 8 | Bareilly | None | Santosh Gangwar | Bharatiya Janata Party | | Won |
| 9 | Pilibhit | None | Maneka Gandhi | Bharatiya Janata Party | | Won |
| 10 | Shahjahanpur | None | Suresh Kumar Khanna | Bharatiya Janata Party | | Lost |
| 11 | Kheri | None | Vinay Katiyar | Bharatiya Janata Party | | Lost |
| 12 | Shahabad | None | Satya Dev Singh | Bharatiya Janata Party | | Lost |
| 13 | Sitapur | None | Janardan Prasad Mishra | Bharatiya Janata Party | | Lost |
| 14 | Misrikh | SC | Paragi Lal Chau | Bharatiya Janata Party | | Lost |
| 15 | Hardoi | SC | Anita Verma | Bharatiya Janata Party | | Lost |
| 16 | Lucknow | None | Atal Bihari Vajpayee | Bharatiya Janata Party | | Won |
| 17 | Mohanlalganj | SC | Mast Ram | Bharatiya Janata Party | | Lost |
| 18 | Unnao | None | Devi Bux Singh | Bharatiya Janata Party | | Lost |
| 19 | Raebareli | None | Girish Narayan Panday | Bharatiya Janata Party | | Lost |
| 20 | Pratapgarh | None | Ramashankar Singh | Bharatiya Janata Party | | Lost |
| 21 | Amethi | None | Ram Vilas Vedanti | Bharatiya Janata Party | | Lost |
| 22 | Sultanpur | None | Veena Pandey | Bharatiya Janata Party | | Lost |
| 23 | Akbarpur | SC | Triveni Ram | Bharatiya Janata Party | | Lost |
| 24 | Faizabad | None | Lallu Singh | Bharatiya Janata Party | | Lost |
| 25 | Bara Banki | SC | Ram Naresh Rawat | Bharatiya Janata Party | | Lost |
| 26 | Kaiserganj | None | Arif Mohammad Khan | Bharatiya Janata Party | | Lost |
| 27 | Bahraich | None | Padamsen Chaudhary | Bharatiya Janata Party | | Lost |
| 28 | Balrampur | None | Brij Bhushan Sharan Singh | Bharatiya Janata Party | | Won |
| 29 | Gonda | None | Ghan Shyam Shukla | Bharatiya Janata Party | | Lost |
| 30 | Basti | SC | Sriram Chauhan | Bharatiya Janata Party | | Lost |
| 31 | Domariaganj | None | Ram Pal Singh | Bharatiya Janata Party | | Lost |
| 32 | Khalilabad | None | Ram Prasad Chaudhary | Bharatiya Janata Party | | Lost |
| 33 | Bansgaon | SC | Raj Narain Passi | Bharatiya Janata Party | | Lost |
| 34 | Gorakhpur | None | Yogi Adityanath | Bharatiya Janata Party | | Won |
| 35 | Maharajganj | None | Pankaj Choudhary | Bharatiya Janata Party | | Won |
| 36 | Padrauna | None | Ram Nagina Mishra | Bharatiya Janata Party | | Lost |
| 37 | Deoria | None | Prakash Mani Tripathi | Bharatiya Janata Party | | Lost |
| 38 | Salempur | None | Rajdhari Singh | Janata Dal (United) | | Lost |
| 39 | Ballia | None | Parmatma Nand Tiwari | Bharatiya Janata Party | | Lost |
| 40 | Ghosi | None | Bharat Lal Rahi Kushwaha | Bharatiya Janata Party | | Lost |
| 41 | Azamgarh | None | Shah Mohammad | Bharatiya Janata Party | | Lost |
| 42 | Lalganj | SC | Kalpnath | Bharatiya Janata Party | | Lost |
| 43 | Machhlishahr | None | Keshari Nath Tripathi | Bharatiya Janata Party | | Lost |
| 44 | Jaunpur | None | Swami Chinmayanand | Bharatiya Janata Party | | Lost |
| 45 | Saidpur | SC | Vidyasagar Sonkar | Bharatiya Janata Party | | Lost |
| 46 | Ghazipur | None | Manoj Sinha | Bharatiya Janata Party | | Lost |
| 47 | Chandauli | None | Shashikant Rajbhar | Bharatiya Janata Party | | Lost |
| 48 | Varanasi | None | Shankar Prasad Jaiswal | Bharatiya Janata Party | | Lost |
| 49 | Robertsganj | SC | Ram Shakal | Bharatiya Janata Party | | Lost |
| 50 | Mirzapur | None | Virendra Singh | Bharatiya Janata Party | | Lost |
| 51 | Phulpur | None | Beni Madhav Bind | Bharatiya Janata Party | | Lost |
| 52 | Allahabad | None | Murli Manohar Joshi | Bharatiya Janata Party | | Lost |
| 53 | Chail | SC | Amrit Lal Bharti | Bharatiya Janata Party | | Lost |
| 54 | Fatehpur | None | Ashok Kumar Patel | Bharatiya Janata Party | | Lost |
| 55 | Banda | None | Bhairon Prasad Mishra | Bharatiya Janata Party | | Lost |
| 56 | Hamirpur | None | Surendra Pal Singh | Bharatiya Janata Party | | Lost |
| 57 | Jhansi | None | Rajendra Agnihotri | Bharatiya Janata Party | | Lost |
| 58 | Jalaun | SC | Bhanu Pratap Singh Verma | Bharatiya Janata Party | | Won |
| 59 | Ghatampur | SC | Kamal Rani Varun | Bharatiya Janata Party | | Lost |
| 60 | Bilhaur | None | Shyam Bihari Misra | Bharatiya Janata Party | | Lost |
| 61 | Kanpur | None | Satyadev Pachauri | Bharatiya Janata Party | | Lost |
| 62 | Etawah | None | Sarita Bhadauria | Bharatiya Janata Party | | Lost |
| 63 | Kannauj | None | Ramanand Yadav | Bharatiya Janata Party | | Lost |
| 64 | Farrukhabad | None | Mukesh Rajput | Bharatiya Janata Party | | Lost |
| 65 | Mainpuri | None | Balram Singh Yadav | Bharatiya Janata Party | | Lost |
| 66 | Jalesar | None | Pratyendra Pal Singh | Bharatiya Janata Party | | Lost |
| 67 | Etah | None | Ashok Ratan Shakya | Bharatiya Janata Party | | Lost |
| 68 | Firozabad | SC | Kishori Lal Mahaur | Bharatiya Janata Party | | Lost |
| 69 | Agra | None | Murari Lal Mittal | Bharatiya Janata Party | | Lost |
| 70 | Mathura | None | Chaudhary Tejveer Singh | Bharatiya Janata Party | | Lost |
| 71 | Hathras | SC | Kishan Lal Diler | Bharatiya Janata Party | | Won |
| 72 | Aligarh | None | Sheela Gautam | Bharatiya Janata Party | | Lost |
| 73 | Khurja | SC | Ashok Kumar Pradhan | Bharatiya Janata Party | | Won |
| 74 | Bulandshahr | None | Kalyan Singh | Bharatiya Janata Party | | Won |
| 75 | Hapur | None | Ramesh Chand Tomar | Bharatiya Janata Party | | Lost |
| 76 | Meerut | None | K. C. Tyagi | Janata Dal (United) | | Lost |
| 77 | Baghpat | None | Satya Pal Malik | Bharatiya Janata Party | | Lost |
| 78 | Muzaffarnagar | None | Amar Pal Singh | Bharatiya Janata Party | | Lost |
| 79 | Kairana | None | Amarkant Rana | Bharatiya Janata Party | | Lost |
| 80 | Saharanpur | None | Chaudhary Yashpal Singh | Bharatiya Janata Party | | Lost |

== Uttarakhand ==
BJP (5)

| Constituency No. | Constituency | Reserved for (SC/ST/None) | Candidate | Party | Poll On | Result |
|---|---|---|---|---|---|---|
| 1 | Tehri Garhwal | None | Manabendra Shah | Bharatiya Janata Party | | Won |
| 2 | Garhwal | None | B. C. Khanduri | Bharatiya Janata Party | | Won |
| 3 | Almora | None | Bachi Singh Rawat | Bharatiya Janata Party | | Won |
| 4 | Nainital | None | Vijay Bansal | Bharatiya Janata Party | | Lost |
| 5 | Haridwar | SC | Harpal Singh Sathi | Bharatiya Janata Party | | Lost |

== West Bengal ==
AITC (29) BJP (13)

| Constituency No. | Constituency | Reserved for (SC/ST/None) | Candidate | Party | Poll On | Result |
|---|---|---|---|---|---|---|
| 1 | Cooch Behar | SC | Girindra Nath Barman | All India Trinamool Congress | | Lost |
| 2 | Alipurduars | ST | Manoj Tigga | Bharatiya Janata Party | | Lost |
| 3 | Jalpaiguri | None | Parash Datta | All India Trinamool Congress | | Lost |
| 4 | Darjeeling | None | G.S. Yonzone | Bharatiya Janata Party | | Lost |
| 5 | Raiganj | None | Zainal Abedin | All India Trinamool Congress | | Lost |
| 6 | Balurghat | SC | Manomohan Ray | Bharatiya Janata Party | | Lost |
| 7 | Malda | None | Badsha Alam | Bharatiya Janata Party | | Lost |
| 8 | Jangipur | None | Shish Mohammad | All India Trinamool Congress | | Lost |
| 9 | Murshidabad | None | Mohammad Ali | All India Trinamool Congress | | Lost |
| 10 | Berhampore | None | Tapas Kumar Chatterjee | Bharatiya Janata Party | | Lost |
| 11 | Krishnagar | None | Satyabrata Mookherjee | Bharatiya Janata Party | | Lost |
| 12 | Nabadwip | SC | Nilima Nag | All India Trinamool Congress | | Lost |
| 13 | Barasat | None | Ranjit Kumar Panja | All India Trinamool Congress | | Lost |
| 14 | Basirhat | None | Sujit Bose | All India Trinamool Congress | | Lost |
| 15 | Joynagar | SC | Asit Baran Thakur | Bharatiya Janata Party | | Lost |
| 16 | Mathurapur | SC | Radhika Ranjan Pramanick | All India Trinamool Congress | | Lost |
| 17 | Diamond Harbour | None | Saugata Roy | All India Trinamool Congress | | Lost |
| 18 | Jadavpur | None | Krishna Bose | All India Trinamool Congress | | Lost |
| 19 | Barrackpore | None | Arjun Singh | All India Trinamool Congress | | Lost |
| 20 | Dum Dum | None | Tapan Sikdar | Bharatiya Janata Party | | Lost |
| 21 | Calcutta North West | None | Subrata Mukherjee | All India Trinamool Congress | | Lost |
| 22 | Calcutta North East | None | Ajit Kumar Panja | All India Trinamool Congress | | Lost |
| 23 | Calcutta South | None | Mamata Banerjee | All India Trinamool Congress | | Won |
| 24 | Howrah | None | Bikram Sarkar | All India Trinamool Congress | | Lost |
| 25 | Uluberia | None | Rajib Banerjee | All India Trinamool Congress | | Lost |
| 26 | Serampore | None | Akbar Ali Khandoker | All India Trinamool Congress | | Lost |
| 27 | Hooghly | None | Indrani Mukherjee | All India Trinamool Congress | | Lost |
| 28 | Arambagh | None | Swapan Kumar Nandi | Bharatiya Janata Party | | Lost |
| 29 | Panskura | None | Hema Choubey | All India Trinamool Congress | | Lost |
| 30 | Tamluk | None | Suvendu Adhikari | All India Trinamool Congress | | Lost |
| 31 | Contai | None | Nitish Sengupta | All India Trinamool Congress | | Lost |
| 32 | Midnapore | None | Rahul Sinha | Bharatiya Janata Party | | Lost |
| 33 | Jhargram | ST | Nityananda Hembram | All India Trinamool Congress | | Lost |
| 34 | Purulia | None | Niyati Mahato | All India Trinamool Congress | | Lost |
| 35 | Bankura | None | Deb Prasad Kundu | All India Trinamool Congress | | Lost |
| 36 | Vishnupur | SC | Janardan Saha | All India Trinamool Congress | | Lost |
| 37 | Durgapur | SC | Shib Narayan Saha | Bharatiya Janata Party | | Lost |
| 38 | Asansol | None | Moloy Ghatak | All India Trinamool Congress | | Lost |
| 39 | Burdwan | None | Anindya Gopal Mitra | Bharatiya Janata Party | | Lost |
| 40 | Katwa | None | Sultan Ahmed | All India Trinamool Congress | | Lost |
| 41 | Bolpur | None | Nirmal Kumar Maji | All India Trinamool Congress | | Lost |
| 42 | Birbhum | SC | Arjun Saha | Bharatiya Janata Party | | Lost |

== Andaman and Nicobar Islands ==
BJP (1)

| Constituency No. | Constituency | Reserved for (SC/ST/None) | Candidate | Party | Poll On | Result |
|---|---|---|---|---|---|---|
| 1 | Andaman and Nicobar Islands | None | Bishnu Pada Ray | Bharatiya Janata Party | | Lost |

== Chandigarh ==
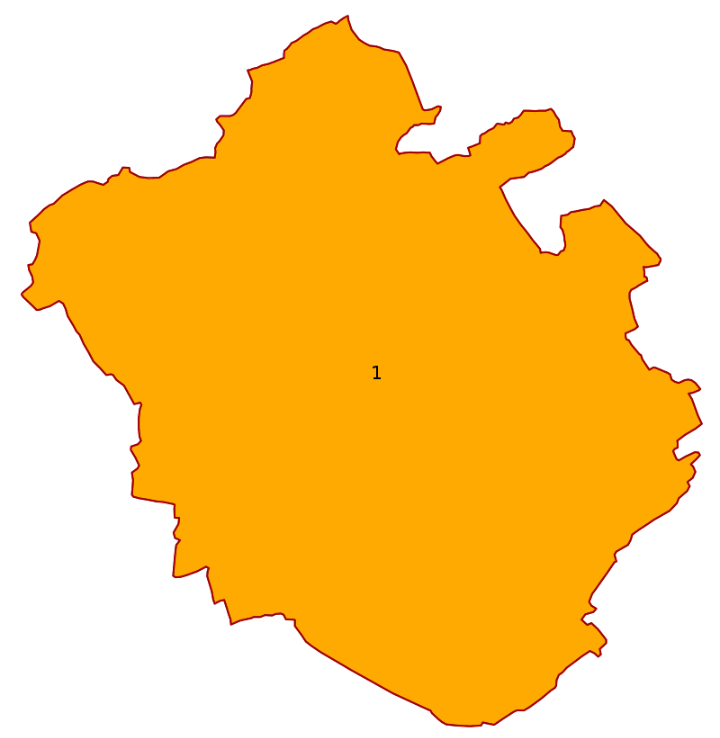

BJP (1)

| Constituency No. | Constituency | Reserved for (SC/ST/None) | Candidate | Party | Poll On | Result |
|---|---|---|---|---|---|---|
| 1 | Chandigarh | None | Satya Pal Jain | Bharatiya Janata Party | | Lost |

== Dadra and Nagar Haveli ==
BJP (1)

| Constituency No. | Constituency | Reserved for (SC/ST/None) | Candidate | Party | Poll On | Result |
|---|---|---|---|---|---|---|
| 1 | Dadra and Nagar Haveli | None | Anilbhai Patel | Bharatiya Janata Party | | Lost |

== Daman and Diu ==
BJP (1)

| Constituency No. | Constituency | Reserved for (SC/ST/None) | Candidate | Party | Poll On | Result |
|---|---|---|---|---|---|---|
| 1 | Daman and Diu | None | Gopalbhai Tandel | Bharatiya Janata Party | | Lost |

== Lakshadweep ==
JD(U) (1)

| Constituency No. | Constituency | Reserved for (SC/ST/None) | Candidate | Party | Poll On | Result |
|---|---|---|---|---|---|---|
| 1 | Lakshadweep | ST | P. Pookunhi Koya | Janata Dal (United) | | Won |

== NCT of Delhi ==
BJP (7)

| Constituency No. | Constituency | Reserved for (SC/ST/None) | Candidate | Party | Poll On | Result |
|---|---|---|---|---|---|---|
| 1 | New Delhi | None | Jagmohan | Bharatiya Janata Party | | Lost |
| 2 | South Delhi | None | Vijay Kumar Malhotra | Bharatiya Janata Party | | Won |
| 3 | Outer Delhi | None | Sahib Singh Verma | Bharatiya Janata Party | | Lost |
| 4 | East Delhi | None | Lal Bihari Tiwari | Bharatiya Janata Party | | Lost |
| 5 | Chandni Chowk | None | Smriti Irani | Bharatiya Janata Party | | Lost |
| 6 | Delhi Sadar | None | Vijay Goel | Bharatiya Janata Party | | Lost |
| 7 | Karol Bagh | SC | Anita Arya | Bharatiya Janata Party | | Lost |

== Puducherry ==
BJP (1)

| Constituency No. | Constituency | Reserved for (SC/ST/None) | Candidate | Party | Poll On | Result |
|---|---|---|---|---|---|---|
| 1 | Pondicherry | None | Lalitha Kumaramangalam | Bharatiya Janata Party | | Lost |

== See also ==
List of National Democratic Alliance candidates in the 1998 Indian general election
List of National Democratic Alliance candidates in the 1999 Indian general election
List of National Democratic Alliance candidates in the 2004 Indian general election
List of National Democratic Alliance candidates in the 2009 Indian general election
List of National Democratic Alliance candidates in the 2014 Indian general election
List of National Democratic Alliance candidates in the 2019 Indian general election
List of National Democratic Alliance candidates in the 2024 Indian general election
