= Manik Singh =

Indian politician

Manik Singh (born in a village in Sakaria, Sidhi district) is an Indian politician, belonging to Indian National Congress. In the 2007 by-elections he was elected to the 14th Lok Sabha from the Sidhi Lok Sabha constituency of Madhya Pradesh.

By-elections were held due to expulsion of sitting MP Chandrapratap Singh of Bhartiya Janata Party due to sting Operation Duryodhan by media firm Cobrapost and Hindi news TV channel Aaj Tak. He resides at Sidhi district .
