= Operation Duryodhana =

Sting Operation in India

Operation Duryodhana (2005) was the code name of a sting operation, which captured on camera eleven members of Parliament of India accepting money to table questions on the floor of the Parliament.

== Description ==
This was the first such sting operation in the history of Republic of India, and all the members were expelled from the Parliament. Ten of them belonged to 14th Lok Sabha while one was from Rajya Sabha.

The operation was named after the Mahabharata character Duryodhana who is popularly viewed as evil and power-hungry.

The eleven members involved were:

1. Narendra Kushwaha (BSP) - Mirzapur, Uttar Pradesh: Rs 55,000
2. Annasaheb M. K. Patil (BJP) - Erandol, Maharashtra: Rs 45,000
3. Chhatrapal Singh Lodha (BJP) - Odisha (Rajya Sabha) : Rs 15,000
4. Y. G. Mahajan (BJP) - Jalgaon, Maharashtra: Rs 35,000
5. Manoj Kumar (Rashtriya Janata Dal) - Palamau, Jharkhand: Rs 110,000
6. Suresh Chandel (BJP) - Hamirpur, Himachal Pradesh: Rs 30,000
7. Raja Ram Pal (BSP) - Bilhaur, Uttar Pradesh : Rs 35,000
8. Lal Chandra Kol (BSP) - Robertsganj, Uttar Pradesh: Rs 35,000
9. Pradeep Gandhi (BJP) - Rajnandgaon, Chhattisgarh: Rs 55,000
10. Chandra Pratap Singh (BJP) - Sidhi, Madhya Pradesh : Rs 35,000
11. Ramsevak Singh (Congress) - Gwalior, Madhya Pradesh: Rs 50,000

The party-wise breakup is:

- Bharatiya Janata Party: 6
- Bahujan Samaj Party: 3
- Indian National Congress: 1
- Rashtriya Janata Dal: 1

The party breakup is a result of the access the journalists had to different politicians (many of the BJP leads were connected to their original contacts).

Conversion rates: approx. Rs. 45 was one US Dollar towards the end of 2005.
