= Rajendra Kumar Badi =

Indian politician

Member of parliament
- In office 2004–2009
- Preceded by: Harpal Singh Sathi
- Succeeded by: Harish Rawat
- Constituency: Hardwar

Personal details
- Born: 10 October 1954 (age 71) Haridwar, Uttar Pradesh, (now in Uttarakhand, India
- Party: Indian National Congress (since 2021)
- Other political affiliations: SP (until 2021)
- Spouse: Sarla Devi
- Children: 3 sons and 1 daughter
- As of 16 September Source

Rajendra Kumar Badi (born 10 October 1954) is an Indian politician and was a member of the 14th Lok Sabha of India. He represented the Haridwar constituency of Uttarakhand as a member of the Samajwadi Party (SP) political party

He joined the congress on 26 July 2021 in presence of then Uttrakhand congress president shri Ganesh Godiyal and Devendra Yadav.
