= Ramsevak Singh (Babuji) =

Indian politician

Member of parliament, Lok Sabha
- Constituency: Gwalior

Personal details
- Born: 27 March 1953 (age 73) Gwalior, Madhya Pradesh
- Party: INC
- Spouse: Kalavati
- Children: 3 sons Udayveer singh, Jaiveer Singh and Dharamveer singh and 1 daughter Rekha Singh.
- As of 22 September, 2006

Ramsevak Singh (born 27 March 1953) is an Indian politician and is a member of the Indian National Congress (INC) political party. He was a member of the 14th Lok Sabha of India, where he represented the Gwalior constituency of Madhya Pradesh.

== Expulsion ==
In the sting Operation Duryodhana by the Noida based media firm Cobrapost, aired 12 December 2005 on the Indian Hindi news TV Channel Aaj Tak, Ramsevak Singh was caught on video accepting bribes of Rs. 50,000 for fielding fictitious questions in parliament.

On 23 December 2005 a Special Committee of the Lok Sabha found him guilty of contempt of the House and following a motion calling for the expulsion of all 11 MPs caught in the sting, he was expelled from Parliament.

Political career.

He defeated Jaibhan singh pawaiya in 2004 elections by a margin of 35000 votes and was the MP of gwalior district which was dominated by BJP with all the 8 legislative assembly seats. Since Madhav rao scindia no congress MP could win gwalior parliamentary seat but Ramsevak singh defeated Jaibhan singh pawaiya who chased away Madhav rao scindia from gwalior seat. Since his expulsion the BJP still dominates in gwalior province.
