= 14th Lok Sabha =

Lower House members elected in 2004

←	13th	15th	→
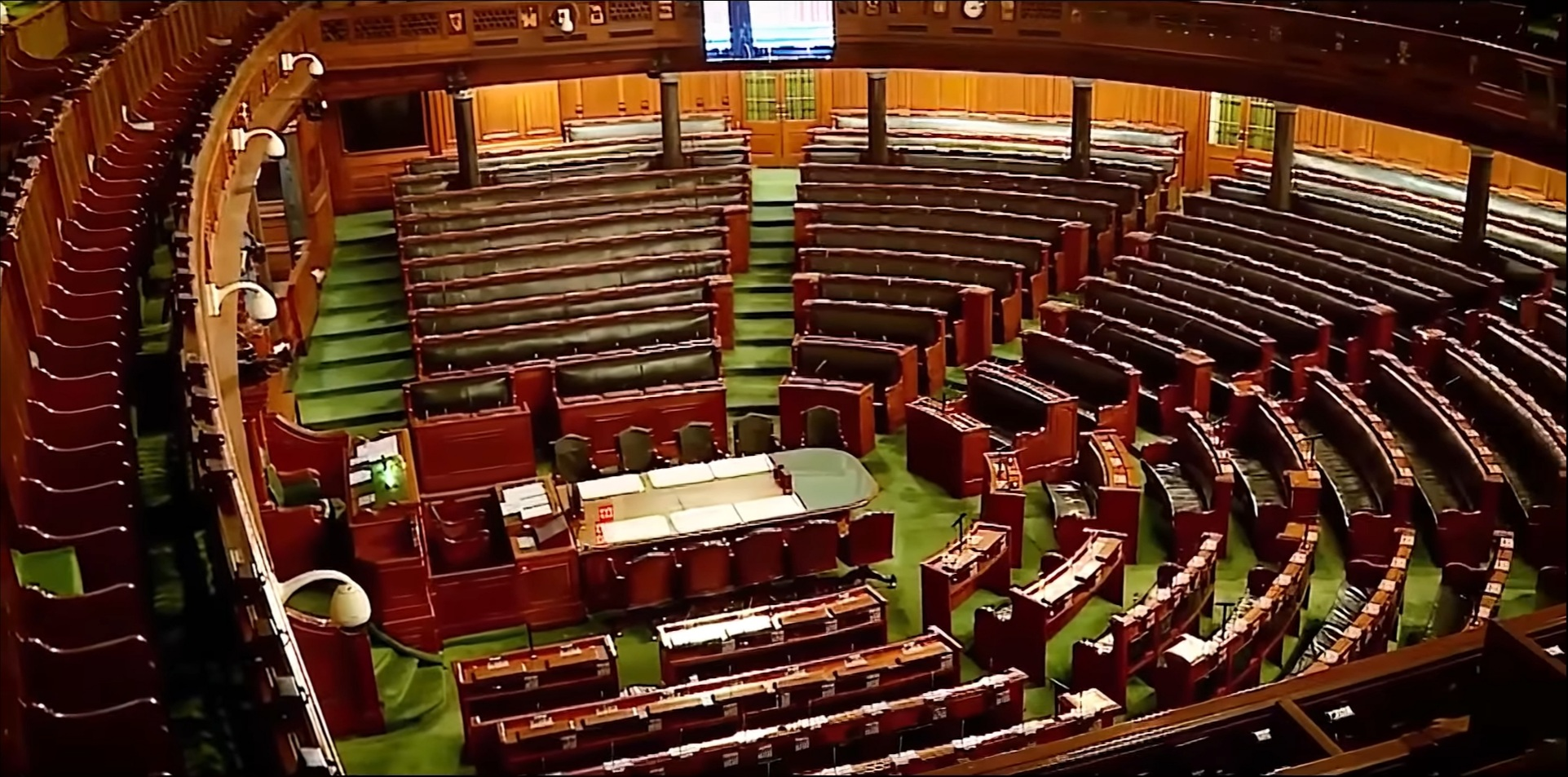
- View of Lok Sabha chamber in the Old Parliament House, New Delhi

Overview
- Legislative body: Indian Parliament
- Term: 2 June 2004 - 18 May 2009
- Election: 2004 Indian general election
- Government: First Manmohan Singh ministry

Sovereign
- President: A. P. J. Abdul Kalam; Pratibha Patil
- Vice President: Bhairon Singh Shekhawat; Hamid Ansari

House of the People
- Members: 545
- Speaker of the House: Somnath Chatterjee
- Leader of the House: Pranab Mukherjee
- Prime Minister: Manmohan Singh
- Leader of the Opposition: L. K. Advani
- Party control: United Progressive Alliance

The 14th Lok Sabha (2 June 2004 – 18 May 2009) was convened after the 2004 Indian general election, held in four phases during 20 April – 10 May 2004, which led to the formation of the first Manmohan Singh ministry (2004–2009). Indian National Congress-led United Progressive Alliance won 62 more seats than previous 13th Lok Sabha. The Lok Sabha (House of the People) is the lower house in the Parliament of India. 8 sitting members from Rajya Sabha, the Upper House of Indian Parliament, were elected to 14th Lok Sabha after the 2004 Indian general election.

The next 15th Lok Sabha was convened after 2009 Indian general election.

== Bills ==
During the tenure of the 14th Lok Sabha, 60% of bills were referred to Parliamentary committees for examination.

== Members ==
- Speaker: Somnath Chatterjee, Communist Party of India (Marxist), Bolpur, West Bengal
- Deputy Speaker: Charanjit Singh Atwal, Shiromani Akali Dal, Phillaur, Punjab
- Leader of the House: Pranab Mukherjee, Indian National Congress, Jangipur, West Bengal (PM Manmohan Singh was from Upper house)
- Leader of the Opposition: Lal Krishna Advani, Bharatiya Janata Party, Gandhinagar, Gujarat
- Secretary General: P. D. T. Acharya

== Expulsion of members for contempt of the House ==
On 12 December 2005, the Star TV news channel telecast the sting operation Operation Duryodhana, in which 11 Members of Parliament, 10 from Lok Sabha and 1 from Rajya Sabha, were apparently caught on video receiving cash inducements in return for raising questions in the Parliament. Following swift inquiries by the Ethics Committee of Rajya Sabha and a Special Committee of the Lok Sabha the members were found guilty and the motion for their expulsion was adopted in respective Houses.

On 23 December 2005, the following 10 members were ousted from the 14th Lok Sabha as per the adoption of the motion calling for their expulsion:

1. Narendra Kushwaha (BSP) – Mirzapur, Uttar Pradesh
2. Annasaheb M. K. Patil (BJP) – Erandol, Maharashtra
3. Y. G. Mahajan (BJP) – Jalgaon, Maharashtra
4. Manoj Kumar (RJD) – Palamau, Jharkhand
5. Suresh Chandel (BJP) – Hamirpur, Himachal Pradesh
6. Raja Ram Pal (BSP) – Bilhaur, Uttar Pradesh
7. Lal Chandra Kol (BSP) – Robertsganj, Uttar Pradesh
8. Pradeep Gandhi (BJP) – Rajnandgaon, Chhattisgarh
9. Chandra Pratap Singh (BJP) – Sidhi, Madhya Pradesh
10. Ramsevak Singh (Congress) – Gwalior, Madhya Pradesh

== List of members by political party ==
S.No.	Party name	Party flag	Number of MPs	Leader in Lok Sabha
1	Indian National Congress (INC)		141	Pranab Mukherjee
2	Bharatiya Janata Party (BJP)		130	L. K. Advani
3	Communist Party of India (Marxist) (CPI(M))		43	Basudev Acharia
4	Samajwadi Party (SP)		36	
5	Rashtriya Janata Dal (RJD)		24	
6	Bahujan Samaj Party (BSP)		17	
7	Dravida Munnetra Kazhagam (DMK)		16	T.R. Baalu
8	Shiv Sena (SS)		12	
9	Biju Janata Dal (BJD)		11	
10	Nationalist Congress Party (NCP)		11	
11	Communist Party of India (CPI)		10	P. K. Vasudevan Nair (till 12 July 2005) Gurudas Dasgupta (afterwards)
12	Shiromani Akali Dal (SAD)		8	
13	Independent (Ind.)		6	
14	Pattali Makkal Katchi (PMK)		6	
15	Jharkhand Mukti Morcha (JMM)		5	
16	Telugu Desam Party (TDP)		5	Kinjarapu Yerran Naidu
17	Bharat Rashtra Samithi (BRS)		5	K. Chandrashekar Rao
18	Lok Jan Shakti Party (LJSP)		4	
19	Marumalarchi Dravida Munnetra Kazhagam (MDMK)		4	
20	All India Forward Bloc (AIFB)		3	
21	Janata Dal (Secular) (JD(S))		3	
22	Rashtriya Lok Dal (RLD)		3	
23	Revolutionary Socialist Party (India) (RSP)		3	
24	Asom Gana Parishad (AGP)		2	
25	Jammu and Kashmir National Conference (J&KNC)		2	
26	Kerala Congress (KEC)		2	
27	All India Majlis-e-Ittehadul Muslimeen (AIMIM)		1	Asaduddin Owaisi
28	All India Trinamool Congress (AITC)		2	Mamata Banerjee
29	Bharatiya Navshakti Party (BNP)		1	
31	Jammu & Kashmir Peoples Democratic Party (J&KPDP)		1	
32	Mizo National Front (MNF)		1	
33	Indian Union Muslim League (IUML)		1	
34	Nagaland Peoples Front (NPF)		1	
35	National Loktantrik Party (NLP)		1	
36	Republican Party of India (A) (RPI(A))		1	
37	Sikkim Democratic Front (SDF)		1	

After a long time since the 8th Lok Sabha, a couple had been elected - Pappu Yadav (RJD MP from Madhepura) & his wife Ranjeet Ranjan (LJSP MP from Saharsa)

=== Cabinet Ministers ===
Portfolio	Minister	Took office	Left office	Party	Remarks
Prime Minister; Minister of Personnel, Public Grievances and Pensions; Department of Atomic Energy; Department of Space; Planning Commission	Manmohan Singh	22 May 2004	22 May 2009	INC	Also in-charge of all other important portfolios and policy issues not allocated to any minister.
Minister of Home Affairs	Shivraj Patil	23 May 2004	30 November 2008	INC	
Minister of Home Affairs	P. Chidambaram	30 November 2008	22 May 2009	INC	
Minister of Defence	Pranab Mukherjee	23 May 2004	24 October 2006	INC	
Minister of Defence	A. K. Antony	24 October 2006	22 May 2009	INC	
Minister of Finance	P. Chidambaram	23 May 2004	30 November 2008	INC	
Minister of Finance	Manmohan Singh	30 November 2008	24 January 2009	INC	Prime Minister-in-charge; Additional charge.
Minister of Finance	Pranab Mukherjee	24 January 2009	22 May 2009	INC	Additional charge.
Minister of External Affairs	Natwar Singh	23 May 2004	7 November 2005	INC	
Minister of External Affairs	Manmohan Singh	7 November 2005	24 October 2006	INC	Prime Minister-in-charge; Additional charge.
Minister of External Affairs	Pranab Mukherjee	24 October 2006	22 May 2009	INC	
Minister of Railways	Lalu Prasad Yadav	23 May 2004	22 May 2009	RJD	
Ministry of Chemicals and Fertilizers; Minister of Steel	Ram Vilas Paswan	23 May 2004	22 May 2009	LJP	
Minister of Human Resource Development	Arjun Singh	23 May 2004	22 May 2009	INC	
Minister of Parliamentary Affairs	Ghulam Nabi Azad	23 May 2004	1 November 2005	INC	
Minister of Parliamentary Affairs	Priya Ranjan Dasmunsi	1 November 2005	6 April 2008	INC	
Minister of Parliamentary Affairs	Vayalar Ravi	6 April 2008	22 May 2009	INC	
Minister of Urban Development	Ghulam Nabi Azad	23 May 2004	1 November 2005	INC	
Minister of Urban Development	Manmohan Singh	1 November 2005	18 November 2005	INC	Prime Minister-in-charge; Additional charge.
Minister of Urban Development	S. Jaipal Reddy	18 November 2005	22 May 2009	INC	
Minister of Road Transport and Highways	T. R. Baalu	23 May 2004	22 May 2009	DMK	
Minister of Information and Broadcasting	S. Jaipal Reddy	23 May 2004	18 November 2005	INC	
Minister of Information and Broadcasting	Priya Ranjan Dasmunsi	18 November 2005	11 November 2008	INC	
Minister of Information and Broadcasting	Manmohan Singh	11 November 2008	22 May 2009	INC	Prime Minister-in-charge; Additional charge.
Minister of Communications and Information Technology	Dayanidhi Maran	23 May 2004	22 May 2009	DMK	
Minister of Communications and Information Technology	A. Raja	15 May 2007	22 May 2009	DMK	
Minister of Water Resources	Priya Ranjan Dasmunsi	23 May 2004	18 November 2005	INC	
Minister of Water Resources	Santosh Mohan Dev	18 November 2005	29 January 2006	INC	Minister of State (I/C) was responsible.
Minister of Water Resources	Saifuddin Soz	29 January 2006	22 May 2009	INC	
Minister of Agriculture; Ministry of Food and Civil Supplies, Consumer Affairs and Public Distribution	Sharad Pawar	23 May 2004	22 May 2009	NCP	
Minister of Rural Development	Raghuvansh Prasad Singh	23 May 2004	22 May 2009	RJD	
Minister of Panchayati Raj	Mani Shankar Aiyar	23 May 2004	22 May 2009	INC	
Minister of Labour and Employment	Sis Ram Ola	23 May 2004	27 November 2004	INC	
Minister of Labour and Employment	K. Chandrashekhar Rao	27 November 2004	24 August 2006	TRS	
Minister of Labour and Employment	Manmohan Singh	24 August 2006	24 October 2006	INC	Prime Minister-in-charge. Additional charge.
Minister of Labour and Employment	Oscar Fernandes	24 October 2006	3 March 2009	INC	Minister of State (I/C) was responsible.
Minister of Labour and Employment	G. K. Vasan	3 March 2009	22 May 2009	INC	Minister of State (I/C) was responsible. Additional charge.
Minister of Small Scale, Agro and Rural Industries	Mahavir Prasad	23 May 2004	22 May 2009	INC	Merged as Ministry of Micro, Small and Medium Enterprises.
Minister of Micro, Small and Medium Enterprises	Mahavir Prasad	23 May 2004	22 May 2009	INC	
Minister of Commerce and Industry	Kamal Nath	23 May 2004	22 May 2009	INC	
Minister of Power	P. M. Sayeed	23 May 2004	19 December 2005	INC	Died in office.
Minister of Power	Manmohan Singh	19 November 2005	29 January 2006	INC	Prime Minister-in-charge; Additional charge.
Minister of Power	Sushilkumar Shinde	29 January 2006	22 May 2009	INC	
Minister of Shipping	K. Chandrashekhar Rao	23 May 2004	25 May 2004	TRS	
Minister of Shipping	T. R. Baalu	25 May 2004	2 September 2004	DMK	Merged with Ministry of Road Transport and Highways.
Minister of Coal	Shibu Soren	23 May 2004	24 July 2004	JMM	
Minister of Coal	Manmohan Singh	24 July 2004	27 November 2004	INC	Prime Minister-in-charge; Additional charge.
Minister of Coal	Shibu Soren	27 November 2004	2 March 2005	JMM	
Minister of Coal	Manmohan Singh	2 March 2005	29 January 2006	INC	Prime Minister-in-charge; Additional charge.
Minister of Coal	Shibu Soren	29 January 2006	29 November 2006	JMM	
Minister of Coal	Manmohan Singh	29 November 2006	22 May 2009	INC	Prime Minister-in-charge; Additional charge.
Minister of Petroleum and Natural Gas	Mani Shankar Aiyar	23 May 2004	29 January 2006	INC	
Minister of Petroleum and Natural Gas	Murli Deora	29 January 2006	22 May 2009	INC	
Minister of Mines and Minerals	Shibu Soren	23 May 2004	24 July 2004	JMM	
Minister of Mines and Minerals	Manmohan Singh	24 July 2004	27 November 2004	INC	Prime Minister-in-charge; Additional charge. The Ministry of Mines and Minerals was renamed as Ministry of Mines.
Minister of Mines	Sis Ram Ola	27 November 2004	22 May 2009	INC	
Minister of Heavy Industries and Public Enterprises	Santosh Mohan Dev	23 May 2004	29 January 2006	INC	Minister of State (I/C) was responsible.
Minister of Heavy Industries and Public Enterprises	Santosh Mohan Dev	29 January 2006	22 May 2009	INC	
Minister of Textiles	Shankersinh Vaghela	23 May 2004	22 May 2009	INC	
Minister of Company Affairs	Prem Chand Gupta	23 May 2004	29 January 2006	RJD	Minister of State (I/C) was responsible.
Minister of Company Affairs	Prem Chand Gupta	29 January 2006	9 May 2007	RJD	Renamed as Ministry of Corporate Affairs.
Minister of Corporate Affairs	Prem Chand Gupta	9 May 2007	22 May 2009	RJD	
Minister of Minority Affairs	A. R. Antulay	29 January 2006	22 May 2009	INC	
Ministry of Tribal Affairs	P. R. Kyndiah	23 May 2004	22 May 2009	INC	
Minister of Development of North Eastern Region	P. R. Kyndiah	23 May 2004	24 October 2006	INC	
Minister of Development of North Eastern Region	Mani Shankar Aiyar	24 October 2006	22 May 2009	INC	
Minister of Youth Affairs and Sports	Sunil Dutt	23 May 2004	25 May 2005	INC	Died in office.
Minister of Youth Affairs and Sports	Manmohan Singh	25 May 2005	18 November 2005	INC	Prime Minister-in-charge; Additional charge.
Minister of Youth Affairs and Sports	Oscar Fernandes	18 November 2005	29 January 2006	INC	Minister of State (I/C) was responsible.
Minister of Youth Affairs and Sports	Mani Shankar Aiyar	29 January 2006	6 April 2008	INC	
Minister of Youth Affairs and Sports	M. S. Gill	6 April 2008	22 May 2009	INC	Minister of State (I/C) was responsible.
Minister of Law and Justice	H. R. Bhardwaj	23 May 2004	22 May 2009	INC	
Minister of Social Justice and Empowerment	Meira Kumar	23 May 2004	22 May 2009	INC	
Minister of Environment and Forests	A. Raja	23 May 2004	15 May 2007	DMK	
Minister of Environment and Forests	Manmohan Singh	15 May 2007	22 May 2009	INC	Prime Minister-in-charge; Additional charge.
Minister of Health and Family Welfare	Anbumani Ramadoss	23 May 2004	29 March 2009	PMK	
Minister of Health and Family Welfare	Panabaka Lakshmi	29 March 2009	22 May 2009	INC	Minister of State (I/C) was responsible.
Minister of State (Independent Charge) of Non-Resident Indian Affairs	Jagdish Tytler	23 May 2004	9 September 2004	INC	MoS (I/C) was responsible. Renamed as Ministry of Overseas Indian Affairs.
Minister of Overseas Indian Affairs	Jagdish Tytler	9 September 2004	10 August 2005	INC	MoS (I/C) was responsible.
Minister of Overseas Indian Affairs	Manmohan Singh	10 August 2005	18 November 2005	INC	Prime Minister-in-charge; Additional charge.
Minister of Overseas Indian Affairs	Oscar Fernandes	18 November 2005	29 January 2006	INC	Minister of State (I/C) was responsible.
Minister of Overseas Indian Affairs	Vayalar Ravi	29 January 2006	22 May 2009	INC	
Minister of Culture	S. Jaipal Reddy	23 May 2004	29 January 2006	INC	
Minister of Culture	Ambika Soni	29 January 2006	22 May 2009	INC	
Minister of Tourism	Renuka Chowdhury	23 May 2004	29 January 2006	INC	Minister of State (I/C) was responsible.
Minister of Tourism	Ambika Soni	29 January 2006	22 May 2009	INC	
Minister of Science and Technology	Kapil Sibal	23 May 2004	29 January 2006	INC	Minister of State (I/C) was responsible.
Minister of Science and Technology	Kapil Sibal	29 January 2006	22 May 2009	INC	
Minister of Ocean Development	Kapil Sibal	23 May 2004	29 January 2006	INC	Minister of State (I/C) was responsible.
Minister of Ocean Development	Kapil Sibal	29 January 2006	12 July 2006	INC	Renamed as Ministry of Earth Sciences.
Minister of Earth Sciences	Kapil Sibal	12 July 2006	22 May 2009	INC	
Minister without portfolio	K. Chandrashekhar Rao	25 May 2004	27 November 2004	TRS	
Minister without portfolio	Natwar Singh	7 November 2005	7 December 2005	INC	
Minister without portfolio	Priya Ranjan Dasmunsi	11 November 2008	22 May 2009	INC	
