= Y. G. Mahajan =

Indian politician (1941–2018)

Yashwant Mahajan

Member of Parliament, Lok Sabha
- In office 1999–2007
- Preceded by: Ulhas Vasudeo Patil
- Succeeded by: Haribhau Jawale
- Constituency: Jalgaon

Personal details
- Born: 12 May 1941 Jalgaon, Maharashtra
- Died: 29 October 2018 (aged 77)
- Party: Bharatiya Janata Party
- Spouse: Pramila Mahajan (m. 1973)
- Children: Jeetendra Mahajan; Leena Mahajan
- Parents: Giridhar Mahajan (father); Yashoda Mahajan (mother)
- Education: Bachelor of Arts; Bachelor of Education
- Alma mater: Indore University

Yashwant Giridhar Mahajan (12 May 1941 - 29 October 2018) was an Indian politician from the Bharatiya Janata Party (BJP) political party. He was a member of the 14th Lok Sabha of India, representing the Jalgaon constituency of Maharashtra.

In the sting Operation Duryodhana by the Noida based media firm Cobrapost, aired 12 December 2005 on the Indian Hindi news TV Channel Aaj Tak, Mahajan was caught on video accepting bribes of Rs. 35,000 for fielding questions in parliament.

On 23 December 2005 a Special Committee of the Lok Sabha found him guilty of contempt of the House and following a motion calling for the expulsion of all 11 MPs caught in the sting, he was expelled from Parliament.
