= Lalchandra =

Indian politician

- Constituency: Roberstganj

Personal details
- Born: 12 July 1949 (age 76) Padariya Khurd, Mirzapur
- Party: BSP
- Spouse: Kalui Devi
- Children: 3 sons and 2 daughters
- As of 22 September, 2006

Lalchandra or Lal Chandra Kol (born 12 July 1949) is an Indian politician. He stood for the 2004 Lok Sabha elections on the BSP ticket becoming a Member of Parliament from Robertsganj.

== Expulsion ==
In the sting Operation Duryodhana for fielding fictitious questions in parliament.

On 23 December 2005 a Special Committee of the Lok Sabha found him guilty of contempt of the House and following a motion calling for the expulsion of all 11 MPs caught in the sting, he was expelled from Parliament.
