= Chandrapratap Singh =

Indian politician (born 1957)

MP
- Constituency: Sidhi

Personal details
- Born: 22 January 1957 (age 69) Koriya, Madhya Pradesh
- Party: BJP
- Spouse: Meena Singh
- As of 22 September, 2006

Chandrapratap Singh (born 22 January 1957) is an Indian politician from the Bharatiya Janata Party (BJP) political party. He was a member of the 14th Lok Sabha of India, representing the Sidhi constituency of Madhya Pradesh.

== Expulsion ==
In the sting Operation Duryodhana by the Noida based media firm Cobrapost, aired 12 December 2005 on the Indian Hindi news TV Channel Aaj Tak, Singh was caught on video accepting bribes of Rs. 35,000 for fielding fictitious questions in parliament.

On 23 December 2005, a Special Committee of the Lok Sabha found him guilty of contempt of the House and following a motion calling for the expulsion of all 11 MPs caught in the sting, he was expelled from Parliament.
