= Pradeep Gandhi =

Indian politician

Member of Parliament, Lok Sabha
- In office 2004–2007
- Preceded by: Raman Singh
- Succeeded by: Devwrat Singh
- Constituency: Rajnandgaon

Personal details
- Born: 26 December 1964 (age 61) Dongargaon, Chhattisgarh, India
- Party: BJP
- Spouse: Keerti Gandhi
- Children: 2 sons and 1 daughter
- As of 25 September, 2006

Pradeep Gandhi (born 26 December 1964) is an Indian politician and a member of the Bharatiya Janata Party (BJP) political party.

He was a member of the 14th Lok Sabha of India, representing the Rajnandgaon constituency of Chhattisgarh. He was member of Chhattisgarh Legislative Assembly in 2004.

He is married to Mrs Keerti Gandhi and has two sons and one daughter.
