= 1980 Indian general election in Andhra Pradesh =

- November 1980

42 seats
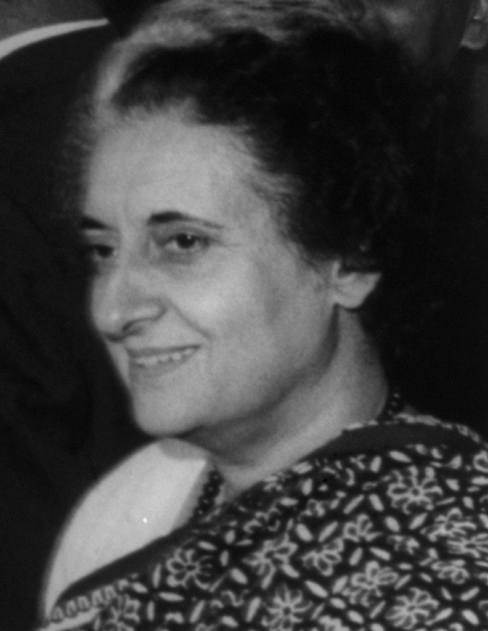
	First party
Leader	Indira Gandhi
Party	INC(I)
Alliance	Congress alliance
Leader's seat	Medak (won)
Last election	41
Seats won	41
Seat change	Steady
Popular vote	9,508,388
Percentage	56.24%
Swing	▼1.24%
Prime Minister before election
Charan Singh
JP(S)
Prime Minister after election
Indira Gandhi
INC

The 1980 Indian general election in Andhra Pradesh were held for 42 seats in the state. The result was a landslide victory for the Indian National Congress (Indira) which won 41 out of 42 seats.

== List of Candidates ==
Constituency		INC(I)		JP(S)+		JP	
No.	Name	Party	Candidate	Party	Candidate	Party	Candidate
1	Srikakulam	INC(I)	Boddepalli Rajagopalarao	JP(S)	Gouthu Latchanna	JP	Majji Narayana Rao
2	Parvathipuram (ST)	INC(I)	Viswasrai Narsimha Rao	INC(U)	Vyricherla K.C. Suryanarayana Deo	Did not contest	
3	Bobbili	INC(I)	P.V. Gajapathi Raju	JP(S)	Yalla Sesibhushana Rao	JP	Gedela Prasada Rao
4	Visakhapatnam	INC(I)	Kommuru Appalaswamy	INC(U)	Bhattam Srirama Murthy	Did not contest	
5	Bhadrachalam (ST)	INC(I)	B. Radhabai Ananda Rao	CPI	Karam Chandraiah	JP	Tadapatla Ratnabai
6	Anakapalli	INC(I)	S.R.A.S. Appala Naidu	JP(S)	Pusapati Anand Gajapathi Raju	Did not contest	
7	Kakinada	INC(I)	M.S. Sanjeevi Rao	JP(S)	Mulasa Suryanarayana	JP	Vaddi Mutyala Rao
8	Rajahmundry	INC(I)	S.B.P. Pattabhi Rama Rao	INC(U)	Gadam Kamaladevi	JP	Kantipudi Rama Rao
9	Amalapuram (SC)	INC(I)	Kusuma Krishnamurthi	INC(U)	Bonthu Venkateswara Rao	JP	Iswari Bai
10	Narasapur	INC(I)	Alluri Subhaschandra Bose	CPI(M)	Uddaraju Ramam	JP	Gudimetla Verahala Reddy
11	Eluru	INC(I)	Chittoori Subbarao Chowdary	CPI	M.V.N. Kaparde	JP	K. Suryanarayana
12	Machilipatnam	INC(I)	Maganti Ankineedu	JP(S)	Parimkayala K. Durgaprasad	JP	Buragadda Niranjana Rao
13	Vijayawada	INC(I)	Chennupati Vidya	CPI	Dasari Nagabhushana Rao	JP	K.L. Rao
14	Tenali	INC(I)	Meduri Nageswara Rao	CPI(M)	Lavu Balagangadhara Rao	JP	Kondamudi Adams
15	Guntur	INC(I)	N. G. Ranga	JP(S)	K. Sadasiva Rao	JP	G. Krishna Kumari
16	Bapatla	INC(I)	Pamulapati Ankineedu Prasada Rao	JP(S)	Pallaprolu Sambaiah	JP	Pragada Kotaiah
17	Narasaraopet	INC(I)	K. Bramhananda Reddy	Did not contest		Did not contest	
18	Ongole	INC(I)	Puli Venkata Reddi	JP(S)	A. V. K. Chaitanya	JP	A. Bhakthavastala Reddy
19	Nellore (SC)	INC(I)	D. Kamakshaiah	CPI(M)	T. P. Bhanu Raju	JP	Indurupalli Ramanaiah
20	Tirupathi (SC)	INC(I)	Pasala Penchalaiah	JP(S)	Mallarapu Jayaramaiah	JP	Tambura Balakrishnaiah
21	Chittoor	INC(I)	P. Rajagopal Naidu	JP(S)	Peddireddy Thimmareddi	JP	N. P. Chengalraya Nayudu
22	Rajampet	INC(I)	P. Parthasarathy	INC(U)	Bandaru Rathnasabapathy	Did not contest	
23	Cuddapah	INC(I)	K. Obul Reddy	JP(S)	P. Raghunatha Reddy	JP	P. V. S. Murthy
24	Hindupur	INC(I)	P. Bayapa Reddy	JP(S)	T. Narasaiah	JP	K. Rama Chandra Reddi
25	Anantapur	INC(I)	Darur Pullaiah	CPI	N. Rajasekhara Reddy	JP	D. Narayanaswmy
26	Kurnool	INC(I)	K. Vijayabhaskara Reddi	JP(S)	K. Venkata Swamy	JP	Nasir Ahmed
27	Nandyal	INC(I)	P. Venkata Subbaiah	INC(U)	Asif Pasha	Did not contest	
28	Nagarkurnool (SC)	INC(I)	Mallu Anantharamulu	JP(S)	Bendi Parsuramulu	JP	M. Bheeshamdev
29	Mahabubnagar	INC(I)	Mallikarjun	INC(U)	J. Rameshwar Rao	Did not contest	
30	Hyderabad	INC(I)	K.S. Narayana	INC(U)	J.B. Muthyal Rao	JP	Ale Narendra
31	Secunderabad	INC(I)	P. Shiv Shanker	JP(S)	Y. Sivarama Sastry	JP	M. Sreedhar Reddy
32	Siddipet (SC)	INC(I)	Nandi Yellaiah	JP(S)	Babu Rao	Did not contest	
33	Medak	INC(I)	Indira Gandhi	JP(S)	Kesava Rao Jadav	JP	S. Jaipal Reddy
34	Nizamabad	INC(I)	M. Ramgopal Reddy	JP(S)	G. Madhusudhan Reddy	JP	K. M. Khan
35	Adilabad	INC(I)	G. Narasimha Reddy	JP(S)	A. Padmanabha Reddy	JP	P. Rajeshwar Rao
36	Peddapalli (SC)	INC(I)	K. Rajamallu	CPI	P. Rajalingaiah	JP	V. Tulsiram
37	Karimnagar	INC(I)	M. Satyanarayana Rao	JP(S)	Gurram Mahdava Reddy	JP	Chennamaneni Vidya Sagar Rao
38	Hanamkonda	INC(I)	P. V. Narsimha Rao	INC(U)	P. Janardhan Reddy	Did not contest	
39	Warangal	INC(I)	Md. Kamaloddin Ahmed	INC(U)	T. Purshotham Rao	Did not contest	
40	Khammam	INC(I)	Jalagam Kondala Rao	CPI(M)	Yalamanchili Radha Krishna Murthi	Did not contest	
40	Khammam	INC(I)	Jalagam Kondala Rao	INC(U)	Samineni Upendraiah	Did not contest	
41	Nalgonda	INC(I)	T. Damodar Reddy	CPI	B. Dharma Bhiksham	JP	Nallu Indrasena Reddy
42	Miryalguda	INC(I)	G. S. Reddy	CPI(M)	B. Narasimha Reddy	JP	Dosapati Gopalu

== Voting and results ==
=== Results by Party/Alliance ===
Alliance/ Party		Popular vote			Seats		
Alliance/ Party		Votes	%	±pp	Contested	Won	+/−
INC(I)		95,08,388	56.24	▼1.12	42	41	Steady
JP(S)+	INC(U)	12,22,932	7.23	Steady	10 + 1	1	▲1
JP(S)+	JP(S)	10,82,440	6.40	Steady	20	0	Steady
JP(S)+	CPI	6,21,870	3.68	▲1.01	6	0	Steady
JP(S)+	CPI(M)	6,01,620	3.56	▼1.15	4 + 1	0	Steady
JP(S)+	Total	35,28,862	20.87	Steady	40 + 2	1	▲1
JP		25,75,925	15.24	▼17.09	31	0	▼1
BSP		13,380	0.08	Steady	1	0	Steady
RRP		839	0.00	Steady	1	0	Steady
IND		12,80,398	7.57	▲4.76	154	0	Steady
Total		1,69,07,792	100%	-	271	42	-

== List of MPs won ==
Constituency		Winner				Runner-up				Margin	
Constituency		Candidate	Party	Votes	%	Candidate	Party	Votes	%	Votes	%
1	Srikakulam	Boddepalli Rajagopalarao	INC(I)	1,97,336	49.33	Gouthu Latchanna	JP(S)	1,18,347	29.58	78,989	19.75
2	Parvathipuram (ST)	Kishore Chandra Deo	INC(U)	1,73,179	49.03	Viswasrai Narsimha Rao	INC(I)	1,58,379	44.84	14,800	4.19
3	Bobbili	Pusapati Vijayarama Gajapati Raju	INC(I)	1,89,163	64.34	Gedela Prasada Rao	JP	51,037	17.36	1,38,126	46.98
4	Visakhapatnam	Kommuru Appalaswamy	INC(I)	2,06,581	50.50	Bhattam Srirama Murthy	INC(U)	1,71,946	42.04	34,635	8.46
5	Bhadrachalam (ST)	B. Radhabai Ananda Rao	INC(I)	1,47,534	53.35	Karam Chandraiah	CPI	79,208	28.64	68,326	24.71
6	Anakapalli	S. R. A. S. Appala Naidu	INC(I)	1,78,139	46.89	Pusapati Anand Gajapathi Raju	JP(S)	1,49,016	39.23	29,123	7.66
7	Kakinada	M. S. Sanjeevi Rao	INC(I)	2,42,901	61.93	Vaddi Mutyala Rao	JP	79,924	20.38	1,62,977	41.55
8	Rajahmundry	S. B. P. Pattabhirama Rao	INC(I)	2,49,377	53.18	Gadam Kamaladevi	INC(U)	1,30,886	27.91	1,18,491	25.27
9	Amalapuram (SC)	Kusuma Murthy	INC(I)	2,44,283	61.63	Iswari Bai	JP	1,23,193	31.08	1,21,090	30.55
10	Narasapur	Subhash Chandra Bose Alluri	INC(I)	2,72,124	61.56	Uddaraju Ramam	CPI(M)	1,14,156	25.82	1,57,968	35.74
11	Eluru	Chittoori Subbarao Chowdary	INC(I)	2,66,805	59.15	K. Suryanarayana	JP	83,470	18.50	1,83,335	40.65
12	Machilipatnam	Maganti Ankineedu	INC(I)	2,49,444	53.93	Buragadda Niranjana Rao	JP	1,15,108	24.89	1,34,336	29.04
13	Vijayawada	Chennupati Vidya	INC(I)	2,40,622	46.39	Kanuri Lakshmana Rao	JP	1,41,920	27.36	98,702	19.03
14	Tenali	Meduri Nageswara Rao	INC(I)	2,14,807	48.62	L. B. G. Rao	CPI(M)	1,44,457	32.70	70,350	15.92
15	Guntur	N. G. Ranga	INC(I)	2,52,961	57.60	Karnad Sadashiva Rao	JP(S)	95,625	21.77	1,57,336	35.83
16	Bapatla	P. Ankineedu Prasada Rao	INC(I)	2,58,116	53.99	Pallaprolu Sambaiah	JP(S)	1,06,375	22.25	1,51,741	31.74
17	Narasaraopet	Kasu Brahmananda Reddy	INC(I)	2,38,854	54.87	Popuri Brahmanandam	IND	1,54,558	35.50	84,296	19.37
18	Ongole	Puli Venkata Reddi	INC(I)	2,66,831	57.19	A. Bhakthavastala Reddy	JP	1,15,656	24.79	1,51,175	32.40
19	Nellore (SC)	D. Kamakshaiah	INC(I)	2,94,326	71.05	T. P. Bhanu Raju	CPI(M)	67,075	16.19	2,27,251	54.86
20	Tirupathi (SC)	Pasala Penchalaiah	INC(I)	2,41,965	68.66	Tambura Balakrishnaiah	JP	86,659	24.59	1,55,306	44.07
21	Chittoor	Paturi Rajagopala Naidu	INC(I)	2,32,249	51.55	N. P. Chengalraya Nayudu	JP	1,72,402	38.27	59,847	13.28
22	Rajampet	P. Parthasarathy	INC(I)	1,89,311	52.51	Bandaru Rathnasabapathy	INC(U)	1,47,910	41.02	41,401	11.49
23	Cuddapah	Kandula Obul Reddy	INC(I)	2,56,204	50.88	P. V. S. Murthy	JP	2,05,658	40.85	50,546	10.03
24	Hindupur	Pamudurthi Bayapa Reddy	INC(I)	1,72,401	58.88	K. Rama Chandra Reddi	JP	93,962	32.09	78,439	26.79
25	Anantapur	Darur Pullaiah	INC(I)	1,71,838	49.28	D. Narayanaswamy	JP	98,561	28.26	73,277	21.02
26	Kurnool	Kotla Vijaya Bhaskara Reddy	INC(I)	2,31,889	77.53	Nasir Ahmed	JP	27,040	9.04	2,04,849	68.49
27	Nandyal	Pendekanti Venkatasubbaiah	INC(I)	2,19,606	55.78	Asif Pasha	INC(U)	1,41,228	35.87	78,378	19.91
28	Nagarkurnool (SC)	A. R. Mallu	INC(I)	2,30,364	63.03	M. Bheeshamdev	JP	80,405	22.00	1,49,959	41.03
29	Mahabubnagar	Mallikarjun Goud	INC(I)	2,41,665	65.55	J. Rameshwar Rao	INC(U)	89,004	24.14	1,52,661	41.41
30	Hyderabad	K.S. Narayana	INC(I)	1,66,868	39.24	Ale Narendra	JP	1,35,304	31.82	31,564	7.42
31	Secunderabad	P. Shiv Shankar	INC(I)	1,86,238	49.58	M. Sreedhar Reddy	JP	1,57,715	41.99	28,523	7.59
32	Siddipet (SC)	Nandi Yellaiah	INC(I)	2,47,670	78.15	Babu Rao	JP(S)	55,138	17.40	1,92,532	60.75
33	Medak	Indira Gandhi	INC(I)	3,01,577	67.93	Jaipal Reddy	JP	82,453	18.57	2,19,124	49.36
34	Nizamabad	M. Ramgopal Reddy	INC(I)	2,48,283	65.86	K. M. Khan	JP	47,968	12.72	2,00,315	53.14
35	Adilabad	G. Narsimha Reddy	INC(I)	2,34,300	70.59	P. Rajeshwar Rao	JP	52,345	15.77	1,81,955	54.82
36	Peddapalli (SC)	K. Rajamallu	INC(I)	1,98,106	56.99	P. Rajalingaiah	CPI	88,266	25.39	1,09,840	31.60
37	Karimnagar	M. Satyanarayana Rao	INC(I)	2,01,777	56.12	C. Vidyasagar Rao	JP	45,449	12.64	1,56,328	43.48
38	Hanamkonda	P. V. Narasimha Rao	INC(I)	2,57,961	65.90	P. Janardhan Reddy	INC(U)	95,012	24.27	1,62,949	41.63
39	Warangal	Kamaluddin Ahmed	INC(I)	2,65,042	59.56	Thakkalapalli Purushothama Rao	INC(U)	1,43,000	32.14	1,22,042	27.42
40	Khammam	Jalagam Kondala Rao	INC(I)	2,01,559	42.13	Samineni Upendraiah	INC(U)	1,06,076	22.17	95,483	19.96
41	Nalgonda	T. Damodar Reddy	INC(I)	2,20,952	47.99	Dharma Bhiksham	CPI	1,67,283	36.33	53,669	11.66
42	Miryalguda	G. S. Reddi	INC(I)	2,21,980	44.43	B. Narasimha Reddy	CPI(M)	1,73,973	34.82	48,007	9.61

== Post-election Union Council of Ministers from Andhra Pradesh ==
#	Name	Constituency	Designation	Department	From	To	Party
1	Indira Gandhi	Medak	Prime Minister of India		14 Jan 1980	31 Oct 1984	INC(I)
2	P. V. Narasimha Rao	Hanamkonda	Cabinet Minister	External Affairs	14 Jan 1980	19 July 1984	INC(I)
2	P. V. Narasimha Rao	Hanamkonda	Cabinet Minister	Home Affairs	19 July 1984	31 Dec 1984	INC(I)
2	P. V. Narasimha Rao	Hanamkonda	Cabinet Minister	Planning	4 Nov 1984	31 Dec 1984	INC(I)
3	P. Shiv Shankar	Secunderabad	Cabinet Minister	Law, Justice and Company Affairs	14 Jan 1980	15 Jan 1982	INC(I)
3	P. Shiv Shankar	Secunderabad	Cabinet Minister	Petroleum, Chemicals and Fertilizers	15 Jan 1982	2 Sept 1982	INC(I)
3	P. Shiv Shankar	Secunderabad	Cabinet Minister	Energy	2 Sept 1982	31 Dec 1984	INC(I)
4	K. Vijaya Bhaskara Reddy	Kurnool	Cabinet Minister	Shipping and Transport	2 Feb 1983	7 Sept 1984	INC(I)
4	K. Vijaya Bhaskara Reddy	Kurnool	Cabinet Minister	Industry (and Company Affairs)	7 Sept 1984	31 Dec 1984	INC(I)
5	P. Venkatasubbaiah	Nandyal	MoS	Home Affairs	14 Jan 1980	31 Dec 1984	INC(I)
5	P. Venkatasubbaiah	Nandyal	MoS	Parliamentary Affairs	16 Jan 1980	2 Sept 1982	INC(I)
6	S. B. P. Pattabhirama Rao	Rajahmundry	MoS	Finance	2 Sept 1982	7 Feb 1984	INC(I)
6	S. B. P. Pattabhirama Rao	Rajahmundry	MoS	Industry	7 Feb 1984	31 Dec 1984	INC(I)
7	Mallikarjun (Goud)	Mahabubnagar	Deputy Minister	Railways	8 June 1980	29 Jan 1983	INC(I)
7	Mallikarjun (Goud)	Mahabubnagar	Deputy Minister	Education, Culture and Social Welfare	21 Nov 1981	15 Jan 1982	INC(I)
7	Mallikarjun (Goud)	Mahabubnagar	Deputy Minister	Works and Housing	15 Jan 1982	31 Dec 1984	INC(I)
7	Mallikarjun (Goud)	Mahabubnagar	Deputy Minister	Sports	15 Jan 1982	31 Dec 1984	INC(I)
7	Mallikarjun (Goud)	Mahabubnagar	Deputy Minister	Parliamentary Affairs	15 Jan 1982	31 Dec 1984	INC(I)
8	M. S. Sanjeevi Rao	Kakinada	Deputy Minister	Electronics	15 Jan 1982	31 Dec 1984	INC(I)
8	M. S. Sanjeevi Rao	Kakinada	Deputy Minister	Civil Supplies	26 July 1983	31 Oct 1984	INC(I)
9	T. Anjaiah	Rajya Sabha (Andhra Pradesh)	MoS	Labour	8 June 1980	11 Oct 1980	INC(I)
10	P. Venkata Reddy	Rajya Sabha (Andhra Pradesh)	Deputy Minister	Industry	8 June 1980	19 Oct 1980	INC(I)
10	P. Venkata Reddy	Rajya Sabha (Andhra Pradesh)	Deputy Minister	Labour	19 Oct 1980	15 Jan 1982	INC(I)

== See also ==
- Elections in Andhra Pradesh
