= List of members of the 13th Lok Sabha =

Members of Lok Sabha (1999-04)

List of members of 13th Lok Sabha (1999-2004) by state.

== Andhra Pradesh ==
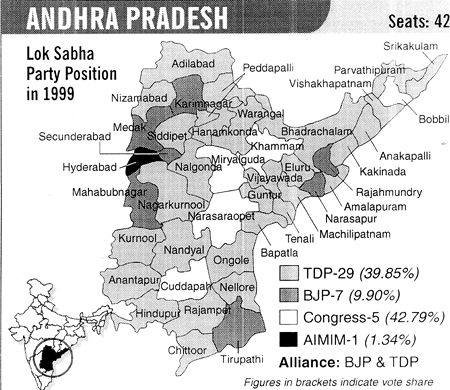
Lok Sabha party position in 1999 (Andhra Pradesh)

Keys: TDP (29) BJP (7) INC (5) AIMIM (1)

No.	Constituency	Name of elected M.P.	Party affiliation
1	Srikakulam	Yerrannaidu Kinjarapu	Telugu Desam Party
2	Parvathipuram (ST)	Dadichiluka Veera Gouri Sankara Rao	Telugu Desam Party
3	Bobbili	Botsa Satyanarayana	Indian National Congress
4	Visakhapatnam	M.V.V.S. Murthi	Telugu Desam Party
5	Bhadrachalam (ST)	Dumpa Mary Vijayakumari	Telugu Desam Party
6	Anakapalli	Ganta Srinivasa Rao	Telugu Desam Party
7	Kakinada	Mudragada Padmanabham	Telugu Desam Party
8	Rajahmundry	SBPBK Satyanarayana Rao	Bharatiya Janata Party
9	Amalapuram (SC)	Ganti Mohanachandra Balayogi (Died on 3.3.2002)	Telugu Desam Party
9	Amalapuram (SC)	Vijaya Kumari Ganti (Elected on 3.6.2002)	Telugu Desam Party
10	Narasapur	Uppalapati Venkata Krishnam Raju	Bharatiya Janata Party
11	Eluru	Bolla Bulli Ramaiah	Telugu Desam Party
12	Machilipatnam	Ambati Brahmanaiah	Telugu Desam Party
13	Vijayawada	Gadde Ramamohan	Telugu Desam Party
14	Tenali	Ummareddy Venkateswarlu	Telugu Desam Party
15	Guntur	Yemparala Venkateswara Rao	Telugu Desam Party
16	Bapatla	Daggubati Ramanaidu	Telugu Desam Party
17	Narasaraopet	Nedurumalli Janardhana Reddy	Indian National Congress
18	Ongole	Karanam Balarama Krishna Murthy	Telugu Desam Party
19	Nellore (SC)	Vukkala Rajeswaramma	Telugu Desam Party
20	Tirupathi (SC)	Nandipaku Venkataswamy	Bharatiya Janata Party
21	Chittoor	Nuthanakalva Ramakrishna Reddy	Telugu Desam Party
22	Rajampet	Gunipati Ramaiah	Telugu Desam Party
23	Cuddapah	Y. S. Vivekananda Reddy	Indian National Congress
24	Hindupur	B K Parthasarathi	Telugu Desam Party
25	Anantapur	Kalava Srinivasulu	Telugu Desam Party
26	Kurnool	K. E. Krishnamurthy	Telugu Desam Party
27	Nandyal	Bhuma Nagi Reddy	Telugu Desam Party
28	Nagarkurnool (SC)	Manda Jagannath	Telugu Desam Party
29	Mahabubnagar	A.P. Jithender Reddy	Bharatiya Janata Party
30	Hyderabad	Sultan Salahuddin Owaisi	All India Majlis-e-Ittehadul Muslimeen
31	Secunderabad	Bandaru Dattatraya	Bharatiya Janata Party
32	Siddipet (SC)	Malyala Rajaiah	Telugu Desam Party
33	Medak	A. Narendra	Bharatiya Janata Party
34	Nizamabad	Gaddam Ganga Reddy	Telugu Desam Party
35	Adilabad	Samudrala Venugopal Chary	Telugu Desam Party
36	Peddapalli (SC)	Chellamalla Suguna Kumari	Telugu Desam Party
37	Karimnagar	Chennamaneni Vidyasagar Rao	Bharatiya Janata Party
38	Hanamkonda	Chada Suresh Reddy	Telugu Desam Party
39	Warangal	Bodakunti Venkateshwarlu	Telugu Desam Party
40	Khammam	Renuka Chowdhury	Indian National Congress
41	Nalgonda	Gutha Sukender Reddy	Telugu Desam Party
42	Miryalguda	Jaipal Reddy Sudini	Indian National Congress

== Arunachal Pradesh ==
Keys: INC (2)

No.	Constituency	Name of elected M.P.	Party affiliation
1	Arunachal West	Jarbom Gamlin	Indian National Congress
2	Arunachal East	Wangcha Rajkumar	Indian National Congress

== Assam ==
Keys: INC (10) BJP(2) CPI(ML)L (1) Independent(1)

No.	Constituency	Name of elected M.P.	Party affiliation
1	Karimganj (SC)	Nepal Chandra Das	Indian National Congress
2	Silchar	Sontosh Mohan Dev	Indian National Congress
3	Autonomous District (ST)	Jayanta Rongpi	Communist Party of India (Marxist-Leninist)
4	Dhubri	Abdul Hamid	Indian National Congress
5	Kokrajhar (ST)	Sansuma Khunggur Bwiswmuthiary	Independent
6	Barpeta	A. F. Golam Osmani	Indian National Congress
7	Guwahati	Bijoya Chakravarty	Bharatiya Janata Party
8	Mangaldoi	Madhab Rajbangshi	Indian National Congress
9	Tezpur	Moni Kumar Subba	Indian National Congress
10	Nowgong	Rajen Gohain	Bharatiya Janata Party
11	Kaliabor	Tarun Gogoi	Indian National Congress
12	Jorhat	Bijoy Krishna Handique	Indian National Congress
13	Dibrugarh	Paban Singh Ghatowar	Indian National Congress
14	Lakhimpur	Ranee Narah	Indian National Congress

== Bihar ==
Keys: BJP (23) JD (U) (18) RJD (7) INC (4) CPI(M) (1) Independent (1)

No.	Constituency	Name of elected M.P.	Party affiliation
1	Bagaha (SC)	Mahendra Baitha	Janata Dal
2	Bettiah|	Dr. Madan Prasad Jaiswal	Bharatiya Janata Party
3	Motihari|	Radha Mohan Singh	Bharatiya Janata Party
4	Gopalganj	Raghunath Jha	Janata Dal
5	Siwan	Mohammad Shahabuddin	Rashtriya Janata Dal
6	Maharajganj	Prabhunath Singh	Janata Dal
7	Chapra	Rajiv Pratap Rudi	Bharatiya Janata Party
8	Hajipur (SC)	Ram Vilas Paswan	Janata Dal
9	Vaishali	Raghubansh Prasad Singh	Rashtriya Janata Dal
10	Muzaffarpur	Captain Jai Narayan Prasad Nishad	Janata Dal
11	Sitamarhi	Nawal Kishore Rai	Janata Dal
12	Sheohar	Md Anwarul Haque	Rashtriya Janata Dal
13	Madhubani	Hukumdeo Narayan Yadav	Bharatiya Janata Party
14	Jhanjharpur	Devendra Prasad Yadav	Janata Dal
15	Darbhanga	Kirti Azad	Bharatiya Janata Party
16	Rosera (SC)	Ram Chandra Paswan	Janata Dal
17	Samastipur	Manjay Lal	Janata Dal
18	Barh	Nitish Kumar	Janata Dal
19	Balia	Ram Jeevan Singh	Janata Dal
20	Saharsa	Dinesh Chandra Yadav	Janata Dal
21	Madhepura	Sharad Yadav	Janata Dal
22	Araria (SC)	Sukdeo Paswan	Rashtriya Janata Dal
23	Kishanganj	Syed Shahnawaz Hussain	Bharatiya Janata Party
24	Purnea	Rajesh Ranjan	Independent
25	Katihar	Nikhil Kumar Choudhary	Bharatiya Janata Party
26	Rajmahal (ST)	Thomas Hansda	Indian National Congress
27	Dumka (ST)	Babulal Marandi	Bharatiya Janata Party
28	Godda	Jagdambi Prasad Yadav	Bharatiya Janata Party
29	Banka	Digvijay Singh	Janata Dal
30	Bhagalpur	Subodh Ray	Communist Party of India
31	Khagaria	Renu Kumari	Janata Dal
32	Monghyr	Brahmanand Mandal	Janata Dal
33	Begusarai	Rajo Singh	Indian National Congress
34	Nalanda	George Fernandes	Janata Dal
35	Patna	C P Thakur	Bharatiya Janata Party
36	Arrah	Ram Prasad Singh	Rashtriya Janata Dal
37	Buxar	Lalmuni Chaubey	Bharatiya Janata Party
38	Sasaram (SC)	Muni Lall	Bharatiya Janata Party
39	Bikramganj	Kanti Singh	Rashtriya Janata Dal
40	Aurangabad	Shyama Singh	Indian National Congress
41	Jahanabad	Arun Kumar	Janata Dal
42	Nawada (SC)	Sanjay Paswan	Bharatiya Janata Party
43	Gaya (SC)	Ramji Manjhi	Bharatiya Janata Party
44	Chatra	Nagmani	Rashtriya Janata Dal
45	Kodarma	Tilakdhari Singh	Indian National Congress
46	Giridih	Ravindra Kumar Pandey	Bharatiya Janata Party
47	Dhanbad	Rita Verma	Bharatiya Janata Party
48	Hazaribagh	Yashwant Sinha	Bharatiya Janata Party
49	Ranchi	Ram Tahal Choudhary	Bharatiya Janata Party
50	Jamshedpur	Abha Mahato	Bharatiya Janata Party
51	Singhbhum (ST)	Laxman Giluwa	Bharatiya Janata Party
52	Khunti (ST)	Kariya Munda	Bharatiya Janata Party
53	Lohardaga (ST)	Dukha Bhagat	Bharatiya Janata Party
54	Palamau (SC)	Braj Mohan Ram	Bharatiya Janata Party

== Goa ==
BJP (2)

No.	Constituency	Name of elected M.P.	Party affiliation
1	Panaji	Shripad Yasso Naik	Bharatiya Janata Party
2	Mormugao	Ramakant Angle	Bharatiya Janata Party

== Gujarat ==
Keys: BJP (20) INC (6)

No.	Constituency	Name of elected M.P.	Party affiliation
1	Kutch	Pushpdan Shambhudan Gadhavi	Bharatiya Janata Party
2	Surendranagar	Savshibhai Kanjibhai Makwana	Indian National Congress
3	Jamnagar	Chandresh Patel Kordia	Bharatiya Janata Party
4	Rajkot	Dr. Vallabhbhai Kathiria	Bharatiya Janata Party
5	Porbandar	Gordhanbhai Javia	Bharatiya Janata Party
6	Junagadh	Chilhaliya Bhavnaben Devrajbhai	Bharatiya Janata Party
7	Amreli	Dileep Sanghani	Bharatiya Janata Party
8	Bhavnagar	Rajendrasinh Ghanshyamsinh Rana	Bharatiya Janata Party
9	Dhandhuka (SC)	Ratilal Kalidas Varma	Bharatiya Janata Party
10	Ahmedabad	Harin Pathak	Bharatiya Janata Party
11	Gandhinagar	L. K. Advani	Bharatiya Janata Party
12	Mehsana	Atmaram Maganbhai Patel	Indian National Congress
13	Patan (SC)	Praveen Rashtrapal	Indian National Congress
14	Banaskantha	Haribhai Parthibhai Chaudhary	Bharatiya Janata Party
15	Sabarkantha	Nihsa Amarsinh Choudhary	Indian National Congress
16	Kapadvanj	Vaghela Shankersinh Laxmansinh	Indian National Congress
17	Dohad (ST)	Babubhai Khimabhai Katara	Bharatiya Janata Party
18	Godhra	Bhupendrasinh Prabhatsinh Solanki	Bharatiya Janata Party
19	Kaira	Dinsha Patel	Indian National Congress
20	Anand	Dipakbhai Chimanbhai Patel	Bharatiya Janata Party
21	Chhota Udaipur (ST)	Ramsinh Rathwa	Bharatiya Janata Party
22	Vadodara	Jayaben Thakkar	Bharatiya Janata Party
23	Bharuch	Mansukhbhai Vasava	Bharatiya Janata Party
24	Surat	Kashiram Rana	Bharatiya Janata Party
25	Mandvi (ST)	Mansinh Patel	Bharatiya Janata Party
26	Bulsar (ST)	Manibhai Ramjibhai Chaudhary	Bharatiya Janata Party

== Haryana ==
Keys: BJP (5) INLD (5)

No.	Constituency	Name of elected M.P.	Party affiliation
1	Ambala (SC)	Rattan Lal Kataria	Bharatiya Janata Party
2	Kurukshetra	Prof. Kailasho Devi	Indian National Lok Dal
3	Karnal	I D Swami	Bharatiya Janata Party
4	Sonepat	Kishan Singh Sangwan	Bharatiya Janata Party
5	Rohtak	Inder Singh	Indian National Lok Dal
6	Faridabad	Ram Chander Bainda	Bharatiya Janata Party
7	Mahendragarh	Sudha Yadav	Bharatiya Janata Party
8	Bhiwani	Ajay Singh Chautala	Indian National Lok Dal
9	Hissar	Surender Singh Barwala	Indian National Lok Dal
10	Sirsa (SC)	Dr. Sushil Kumar Indora	Indian National Lok Dal

== Himachal Pradesh ==
Keys: BJP (3) HVC (1)

No.	Constituency	Name of elected M.P.	Party affiliation
1	Simla (SC)	Dhani Ram Shandil	Himachal Vikas Congress
2	Mandi	Maheshwar Singh	Bharatiya Janata Party
3	Kangra	Shanta Kumar	Bharatiya Janata Party
4	Hamirpur	Suresh Chandel	Bharatiya Janata Party

== Jammu & Kashmir ==
Keys: JKNC (4) BJP (2)

No.	Constituency	Name of elected M.P.	Party affiliation
1	Baramulla	Abdul Rashid Shaheen	Jammu & Kashmir National Conference
2	Srinagar	Omar Abdullah	Jammu & Kashmir National Conference
3	Anantnag	Ali Mohd. Naik	Jammu & Kashmir National Conference
4	Ladakh	Hassan Khan	Jammu & Kashmir National Conference
5	Udhampur	Prof.Chaman Lal Gupta	Bharatiya Janata Party
6	Jammu	Vishno Datt Sharma	Bharatiya Janata Party

== Karnataka ==
Keys: INC (18) BJP (7) JD(U) (3)

No.	Constituency	Name of elected M.P.	Party affiliation
1	Bidar (SC)	Ramchandra Veerappa	Bharatiya Janata Party
2	Gulbarga	Iqbal Ahmed Saradgi	Indian National Congress
3	Raichur	A. Venkatesh Naik	Indian National Congress
4	Koppal	H G Ramulu	Indian National Congress
5	Bellary	Sonia Gandhi	Indian National Congress
6	Davangere	G. Mallikarjunappa	Bharatiya Janata Party
7	Chitradurga	Shashi Kumar	Janata Dal
8	Tumkur	G. S. Basavaraj	Indian National Congress
9	Chikballapur	R.L. Jalappa	Indian National Congress
10	Kolar (SC)	K.H. Muniyappa	Indian National Congress
11	Kanakapura	M. V. Chandrashekara Murthy	Indian National Congress
12	Bangalore North	C K Jaffar Sharief	Indian National Congress
13	Bangalore South	Ananth Kumar	Bharatiya Janata Party
14	Mandya	Ambareesh M. H.	Indian National Congress
15	Chamarajnagar (SC)	V. Srinivasa Prasad	Janata Dal
16	Mysore	Srikantadatta Narasimharaja Wadiyar	Indian National Congress
17	Mangalore	V. Dhananjaya Kumar	Bharatiya Janata Party
18	Udupi	Vinay Kumar Sorake	Indian National Congress
19	Hassan	G. Putta Swamy Gowda	Indian National Congress
20	Chikmagalur	D. C. Srikantappa	Bharatiya Janata Party
21	Shimoga	S. Bangarappa	Indian National Congress
22	Kanara	Margaret Alva	Indian National Congress
23	Dharwad South	Prof. I.G. Sanadi	Indian National Congress
24	Dharwad North	Vijay Sankeshwar	Bharatiya Janata Party
25	Belgaum	Amarsinh Vasantarao Patil	Indian National Congress
26	Chikkodi (SC)	Jigajinagi Ramesh Chandappa	Janata Dal
27	Bagalkot	R S Patil	Indian National Congress
28	Bijapur	Basanagouda R Patil (Yatnal)	Bharatiya Janata Party

== Kerala ==
Keys: CPI(M) (8) INC (8) IUML (2) KC (1) KC(M) (1)

No.	Constituency	Name of elected M.P.	Party affiliation
1	Kasaragod	T. Govindan	Communist Party of India
2	Cannanore	A. P. Abdullakutty	Communist Party of India
3	Vatakara	A.K. Premajam	Communist Party of India
4	Kozhikode	K. Muraleedharan	Indian National Congress
5	Manjeri	E. Ahammed	Indian Union Muslim League
6	Ponnani	G.M. Banatwalla	Indian Union Muslim League
7	Palghat	N. N. Krishnadas	Communist Party of India
8	Ottapalam (SC)	S. Ajaya Kumar	Communist Party of India
9	Trichur	A.C. Jose	Indian National Congress
10	Mukundapuram	K. Karunakaran	Indian National Congress
11	Ernakulam	Adv. George Eden	Indian National Congress
12	Muvattapuzha	P. C. Thomas (Pullolil)	Kerala Congress
13	Kottayam	K. Suresh Kurup	Communist Party of India
14	Idukki	K. Francis George	Kerala Congress
15	Alleppey	V. M. Sudheeran	Indian National Congress
16	Mavelikara	Ramesh Chennithala	Indian National Congress
17	Adoor (SC)	Kodikunnil Suresh	Indian National Congress
18	Quilon	P. Rajendran	Communist Party of India
19	Chirayinkil	Varkala Radhakrishnan	Communist Party of India
20	Trivandrum	V. S. Sivakumar	Indian National Congress

== Madhya Pradesh ==
Keys: BJP (29) INC (11)

No.	Constituency	Name of elected M.P.	Party affiliation
1	Morena (SC)	Ashok Chhaviram Argal	Bharatiya Janata Party
2	Bhind	Dr. Ramlakhan Singh	Bharatiya Janata Party
3	Gwalior	Jaibhan Singh Pavaiya	Bharatiya Janata Party
4	Guna	Madhavrao Scindia	Indian National Congress
5	Sagar (SC)	Virendra Kumar	Bharatiya Janata Party
6	Khajuraho	Satyavrat Chaturvedi	Indian National Congress
7	Damoh	Dr. Ramkrishna Kusmariya	Bharatiya Janata Party
8	Satna	Ramanand Singh	Bharatiya Janata Party
9	Rewa	Sunder Lal Tiwari	Indian National Congress
10	Sidhi (ST)	Chandrapratap Singh	Bharatiya Janata Party
11	Shahdol (ST)	Dalpat Singh Paraste	Bharatiya Janata Party
12	Surguja (ST)	Khel Sai Singh	Indian National Congress
13	Raigarh (ST)	Vishnudeo Sai	Bharatiya Janata Party
14	Janjgir	Charan Das Mahant	Indian National Congress
15	Bilaspur (SC)	Punnulal Mohle	Bharatiya Janata Party
16	Sarangarh (SC)	P P Khute	Bharatiya Janata Party
17	Raipur	Ramesh Bais	Bharatiya Janata Party
18	Mahasamund	Shyama Charan Shukla	Indian National Congress
19	Kanker (ST)	Sohan Potai	Bharatiya Janata Party
20	Bastar (ST)	Baliram Kashyap	Bharatiya Janata Party
21	Durg	Tarachand Sahu	Bharatiya Janata Party
22	Rajnandgaon	Dr. Raman Singh	Bharatiya Janata Party
23	Balaghat	Prahlad Singh Patel	Bharatiya Janata Party
24	Mandla (ST)	Faggan Singh Kulaste	Bharatiya Janata Party
25	Jabalpur	Jaishree Banerjee	Bharatiya Janata Party
26	Seoni	Ram Naresh Tripathi	Bharatiya Janata Party
27	Chhindwara	Kamalnath	Indian National Congress
28	Betul	Khandelwal Vijay Kumar (Munni Bhaia)	Bharatiya Janata Party
29	Hoshangabad	Sundar Lal Patwa	Bharatiya Janata Party
30	Bhopal	Uma Bharti	Bharatiya Janata Party
31	Vidisha	Shivraj Singh Chouhan	Bharatiya Janata Party
32	Rajgarh	Lakshman Singh	Indian National Congress
33	Shajapur (SC)	Thawar Chand Gehlot	Bharatiya Janata Party
34	Khandwa	Nand Kumar Singh Chauhan (Nandu Bhaiya)	Bharatiya Janata Party
35	Khargone	Tarachand Patel	Indian National Congress
36	Dhar (ST)	Gajendra Singh Rajukhedi	Indian National Congress
37	Indore	Sumitra Mahajan	Bharatiya Janata Party
38	Ujjain (SC)	Dr. Satyanarayan Jatiya	Bharatiya Janata Party
39	Jhabua (ST)	Kantilal Bhuria	Indian National Congress
40	Mandsaur	Dr. Laxminarayan Pandey	Bharatiya Janata Party

== Maharashtra ==
Keys: SHS (15) BJP (13) INC (10) NCP (6) BBM (1) JD (S) (1) PWPI (1) Independent (1)

No.	Constituency	Name of elected M.P.	Party affiliation
1	Rajapur	Suresh Prabhakar Prabhu	Shiv Sena
2	Ratnagiri	Anant Geete	Shiv Sena
3	Kolaba	Ramsheth Thakur	Peasants and Workers Party of India
4	Mumbai South	Jayawantiben Mehta	Bharatiya Janata Party
5	Mumbai South Central	Mohan Rawale	Shiv Sena
6	Mumbai North Central	Manohar Joshi	Shiv Sena
7	Mumbai North East	Kirit Somaiya	Bharatiya Janata Party
8	Mumbai North West	Sunil Dutt	Indian National Congress
9	Mumbai North	Ram Naik	Bharatiya Janata Party
10	Thane	Paranjape Prakash Vishvanath	Shiv Sena
11	Dahanu (ST)	Adv. Chintaman Wanaga	Bharatiya Janata Party
12	Nashik	Dikale Uttamrao Nathuji	Shiv Sena
13	Malegaon (ST)	Haribahu Shankar Mahale	Janata Dal
14	Dhule (ST)	Ramdas Rupla Gavit	Bharatiya Janata Party
15	Nandurbar (ST)	Gavit Manikrao Hodlya	Indian National Congress
16	Erandol	Annasaheb M. K. Patil	Bharatiya Janata Party
17	Jalgaon	Y. G. Mahajan	Bharatiya Janata Party
18	Buldhana (SC)	Adsul Anandrao Vithoba	Shiv Sena
19	Akola	Ambedkar Prakash Yashwant	Bharipa Bahujan Mahasangha
20	Washim	Gawali (Patil) Ku. Bhavana Pundlikrao	Shiv Sena
21	Amravati	Anant Gudhe	Shiv Sena
22	Ramtek	Mohite Subodh Baburao	Shiv Sena
23	Nagpur	Vilas Muttemwar	Indian National Congress
24	Bhandara	Chunnilalbhau Thakur	Bharatiya Janata Party
25	Chimur	Diwathe Namdeo Harbaji	Bharatiya Janata Party
26	Chandrapur	Naresh Kumar Puglia	Indian National Congress
27	Wardha	Prabha Rau	Indian National Congress
28	Yavatmal	Uttamrao Deorao Patil	Indian National Congress
29	Hingoli	Shivaji Gyanbarao Mane	Shiv Sena
30	Nanded	Bhaskarrao Bapurao Khatgaonkar	Indian National Congress
31	Parbhani	Suresh Ramrao Jadhav	Shiv Sena
32	Jalna	Danve Raosaheb Dadarao Patil	Bharatiya Janata Party
33	Aurangabad	Chandrakant Khaire	Shiv Sena
34	Beed	Jaisingrao Gaikwad Patil	Bharatiya Janata Party
35	Latur	Shivraj Vishwanath Patil	Indian National Congress
36	Osmanabad (SC)	Shivaji Vithalrao Kamble	Shiv Sena
37	Solapur	Sushilkumar Shinde	Indian National Congress
38	Pandharpur (SC)	Athawale Ramdas Bandu	Independent
39	Ahmednagar	Dilipkumar Mansukhlal Gandhi	Bharatiya Janata Party
40	Kopargaon	E. V. alias Balasaheb Vikhe Patil	Shiv Sena
41	Khed	Ashok Namdeorao Mohol	Nationalist Congress Party
42	Pune	Pradeep Rawat	Bharatiya Janata Party
43	Baramati	Pawar Sharadchandra Govindrao	Nationalist Congress Party
44	Satara	Laxmanrao Pandurang Jadhav (Patil)	Nationalist Congress Party
45	Karad	Patil Shriniwas Dadasaheb	Nationalist Congress Party
46	Sangli	Patil Prakashbapu Vasantdada	Indian National Congress
47	Ichalkaranji	Mane Nivedita Sambhajirao	Nationalist Congress Party
48	Kolhapur	Mandlik Sadashivrao Dadoba	Nationalist Congress Party

== Manipur ==
Keys: MSCP (1) NCP (1)

No.	Constituency	Name of elected M.P.	Party affiliation
1	Inner Maipur	Th. Chaoba Singh	Manipur State Congress Party
2	Outer Manipur (ST)	Holkhomang Haokip	Nationalist Congress Party

== Meghalaya ==
Keys: INC (1) NCP (1)

No.	Constituency	Name of elected M.P.	Party affiliation
1	Shillog	Paty Ripple Kyndiah	Indian National Congress
2	Tura	Purano Agitok Sangma	Nationalist Congress Party

== Mizoram ==
Keys: Independent (1)

No.	Constituency	Name of elected M.P.	Party affiliation
1	Mizoram (ST)	Vanlalzawma	Independent

== Nagaland ==
Keys: INC (1)

No.	Constituency	Name of elected M.P.	Party affiliation
1	Nagaland	K. Asungba Sangtam	Indian National Congress

== Orissa ==
Keys: BJD (10) BJP (9) INC (2)

No.	Constituency	Name of elected M.P.	Party affiliation
1	Mayurbhanj (ST)	Salkhan Murmu	Bharatiya Janata Party
2	Balasore	Mahamegha Bahan Aira Kharbela Swain	Bharatiya Janata Party
3	Bhadrak (SC)	Arjun Charan Sethi	Biju Janata Dal
4	Jajpur (SC)	Jagannath Mallick	Biju Janata Dal
5	Kendrapara	Prabhat Kumar Samantraya	Biju Janata Dal
6	Cuttack	Bhartruhari Mahtab	Biju Janata Dal
7	Jagatsinghpur	Trilochan Kanungo	Biju Janata Dal
8	Puri	Braja Kishore Tripathy	Biju Janata Dal
9	Bhubaneshwar	Prasanna Kumar Patasani	Biju Janata Dal
10	Aska	Naveen Patnaik	Biju Janata Dal
11	Berhampur	Anadi Charan Sahu	Bharatiya Janata Party
12	Koraput (ST)	Hema Gamang	Indian National Congress
13	Nowrangpur (ST)	Parsuram Majhi	Bharatiya Janata Party
14	Kalahandi	Bikram Keshari Deo	Bharatiya Janata Party
15	Phulbani (SC)	Padmanava Behara	Biju Janata Dal
16	Bolangir	Sangeeta Kumari Singh Deo	Bharatiya Janata Party
17	Sambalpur	Prasanna Acharya	Biju Janata Dal
18	Deogarh	Debendra Pradhan	Bharatiya Janata Party
19	Dhenkanal	Kamakhya Prasad Singh Deo	Indian National Congress
20	Sundargarh (ST)	Jual Oram	Bharatiya Janata Party
21	Keonjhar (ST)	Ananta Nayak	Bharatiya Janata Party

== Punjab ==
Keys: INC (8) SAD (3) BJP (1) CPI (1)

No.	Constituency	Name of elected M.P.	Party affiliation
1	Gurdaspur	Vinod Khanna	Bharatiya Janata Party
2	Amritsar	Raghunandan Lal Bhatia	Indian National Congress
3	Tarntaran	Tarlochan Singh Tur	Shiromani Akali Dal
4	Jullundur	Balbir Singh	Indian National Congress
5	Phillaur (SC)	Santosh Chowdhary	Indian National Congress
6	Hoshiarpur	Charanjit Singh	Indian National Congress
7	Ropar (SC)	Shamsher Singh Dullo	Indian National Congress
8	Patiala	Preneet Kaur	Indian National Congress
9	Ludhiana	Gurcharan Singh Galib	Indian National Congress
10	Sangrur	Simranjit Singh Mann	Shiromani Akali Dal
11	Bhatinda (SC)	Bhan Singh Bhaura	Communist Party of India
12	Faridkot	Jagmeet Singh Brar	Indian National Congress
13	Ferozpur	Zora Singh Maan	Shiromani Akali Dal

== Rajasthan ==
Keys; BJP (16) INC (9)

No.	Constituency	Name of elected M.P.	Party affiliation
1	Ganganagar (SC)	Nihalchand Chauhan	Bharatiya Janata Party
2	Bikaner	Rameshwar Dudi	Indian National Congress
3	Churu	Ram Singh Kaswan	Bharatiya Janata Party
4	Jhunjhunu	Sis Ram Ola	Indian National Congress
5	Sikar	Subhash Maharia	Bharatiya Janata Party
6	Jaipur	Girdhari Lal Bhargava	Bharatiya Janata Party
7	Dausa	Rajesh Pilot	Indian National Congress
8	Alwar	Jaswant Singh Yadav	Bharatiya Janata Party
9	Bharatpur	Vishvendra Singh	Bharatiya Janata Party
10	Bayana (SC)	Bahadur Singh Koli	Bharatiya Janata Party
11	Sawai Madhopur (ST)	Jaskaur Meena	Bharatiya Janata Party
12	Ajmer	Rasa Singh Rawat	Bharatiya Janata Party
13	Tonk (SC)	Shyam Lal Bansiwal	Bharatiya Janata Party
14	Kota	Raghuveer Singh Koshal	Bharatiya Janata Party
15	Jhalawar	Vasundhara Raje Scindia	Bharatiya Janata Party
16	Banswara (ST)	Tarachand Bhagora	Indian National Congress
17	Salumber (ST)	Bheru Lal Meena	Indian National Congress
18	Udaipur	Girija Vyas	Indian National Congress
19	Chittorgarh	Shrichand Kriplani	Bharatiya Janata Party
20	Bhilwara	Vijayendrapal Singh	Bharatiya Janata Party
21	Pali	Pusp Jain	Bharatiya Janata Party
22	Jalore (SC)	Sardar Buta Singh	Indian National Congress
23	Barmer	Sona Ram	Indian National Congress
24	Jodhpur	Jaswant Singh Bishnoi	Bharatiya Janata Party
25	Nagaur	Ram Raghunath Chaudhary	Indian National Congress

== Sikkim ==
Keys; SDF (1)

No.	Constituency	Name of elected M.P.	Party affiliation
1	Sikkim	Bhim Pd. Pahal	Sikkim Democratic Front

== Tamil Nadu ==
Keys; DMK (12) AIADMK (10) PMK (5) BJP (4) MDMK (4) INC (2) CPI(M) (1) MGR ADMK (1)

No.	Constituency	Name of elected M.P.	Party affiliation
1	Chennai North	C Kuppusami	Dravida Munnetra Kazhagam
2	Chennai Central	Murasoli Maran	Dravida Munnetra Kazhagam
3	Chennai South	T.R. Baalu	Dravida Munnetra Kazhagam
4	Sriperumbudur (SC)	A. Krishnaswamy	Dravida Munnetra Kazhagam
5	Chengalpattu	A.K. Moorthy	Pattali Makkal Katchi
6	Arakkonam	Dr. S. Jagathrakshakan	Dravida Munnetra Kazhagam
7	Vellore	N T Shanmugam	Pattali Makkal Katchi
8	Tiruppattur	D. Venugopal	Dravida Munnetra Kazhagam
9	Vandavasi	M. Durai	Pattali Makkal Katchi
10	Tindivanam	N. Gingee Ramachandran	Marumalarchi Dravida Munnetra Kazhagam
11	Cuddalore	Adhi Shankar	Dravida Munnetra Kazhagam
12	Chidambaram (SC)	E. Ponnuswamy	Pattali Makkal Katchi
13	Dharampuri	P D Elangovan	Pattali Makkal Katchi
14	Krishnagiri	V. Vetriselvan	Dravida Munnetra Kazhagam
15	Rasipuram (SC)	V. Saroja	All India Anna Dravida Munnetra Kazhagam
16	Salem	T M Selvaganapathi	All India Anna Dravida Munnetra Kazhagam
17	Tiruchengode	M. Kannapan	Marumalarchi Dravida Munnetra Kazhagam
18	Nilgiris	Master M. Mathan	Bharatiya Janata Party
19	Gobichettipalayam	K K Kaliappan	All India Anna Dravida Munnetra Kazhagam
20	Coimbatore	C P Radhakrishnan	Bharatiya Janata Party
21	Pollachi (SC)	Dr. C. Krishnan	Marumalarchi Dravida Munnetra Kazhagam
22	Palani	P. Kuruswamy	All India Anna Dravida Munnetra Kazhagam
23	Dindigul	Dindigul C. Sreenivasan	All India Anna Dravida Munnetra Kazhagam
24	Madurai	P. Mohan	Communist Party of India
25	Periyakulam	Dhinakaran	All India Anna Dravida Munnetra Kazhagam
26	Karur	M. Chinnasamy	All India Anna Dravida Munnetra Kazhagam
27	Tiruchirappalli	Kumaramangalam Arangarajan	Bharatiya Janata Party
28	Perambalur (SC)	A. Raja	Dravida Munnetra Kazhagam
29	Mayiladuthurai	Mani Shankar Aiyar	Indian National Congress
30	Nagapattinam (SC)	A.K.S. Vijayan	Dravida Munnetra Kazhagam
31	Thanjavur	S.S. Palanimanickam	Dravida Munnetra Kazhagam
32	Pudukkottai	Su. Thirunavukkarasar	MGR Anna Dravida Munnetra Kazhagam
33	Shivaganga	E M Sudarsana Natchiappan	Indian National Congress
34	Ramanathapuram	K. Malaisamy	All India Anna Dravida Munnetra Kazhagam
35	Sivakasi	Vaiko	Marumalarchi Dravida Munnetra Kazhagam
36	Tirunelveli	P H Pandian	All India Anna Dravida Munnetra Kazhagam
37	Tenkasi (SC)	S. Murugesan	All India Anna Dravida Munnetra Kazhagam
38	Tiruchendur	A D K Jayaseelan	Dravida Munnetra Kazhagam
39	Nagercoil	P.Radhakrishnan	Bharatiya Janata Party

== Tripura ==
Keys; CPI(M) (2)

No.	Constituency	Name of elected M.P.	Party affiliation
1	Tripura West	Samar Chowdhury	Communist Party of India
2	Tripura East (ST)	Baju Ban Riyan	Communist Party of India

== Uttar Pradesh ==
BJP (29) SP (26) BSP (14) INC (10) RLD (2) ABLTC (2) SJP(R) (1) Independent (1)

No.	Constituency	Name of elected M.P.	Party affiliation
1	Tehri Garhwal	Manabendra Shah	Bharatiya Janata Party
2	Garhwal	Bhuwan Chandra Khanduri	Bharatiya Janata Party
3	Almora	Bachi Singh Rawat	Bharatiya Janata Party
4	Nainital	Narayan Datt Tiwari	Indian National Congress
5	Bijnor (SC)	Sheeshram Singh Ravi	Bharatiya Janata Party
6	Amroha	Raashid Alvi	Bahujan Samaj Party
7	Moradabad	Chandra Vijay Singh	Akhil Bhartiya Lok Tantrik Congress
8	Rampur	Mahtab Zamani Begum	Indian National Congress
9	Sambhal	Mulayam Singh Yadav	Samajwadi Party
10	Budaun	Saleem Iqbal Shervani	Samajwadi Party
11	Aonla	Kunwar Sarvraj Singh	Samajwadi Party
12	Bareilly	Santosh Gangwar	Bharatiya Janata Party
13	Pilibhit	Maneka Gandhi	Independent
14	Shahjahanpur	Jitendra Prasad	Indian National Congress
15	Kheri	Ravi Prakash Verma	Samajwadi Party
16	Shahabad	Daud Ahmad	Bahujan Samaj Party
17	Sitapur	Rajesh Verma	Bahujan Samaj Party
18	Misrikh (SC)	Sushila Saroj	Samajwadi Party
19	Hardoi (SC)	Jai Prakash	Akhil Bhartiya Lok Tantrik Congress
20	Lucknow	Atal Bihari Vajpayee	Bharatiya Janata Party
21	Mohanlalganj (SC)	Reena Chowdhary	Samajwadi Party
22	Unnao	Deepak Kumar	Samajwadi Party
23	Rae Bareli	Satish Sharma	Indian National Congress
24	Pratapgarh	Ratna Singh	Indian National Congress
25	Amethi	Sonia Gandhi	Indian National Congress
26	Sultanpur	Jai Bhadra Singh	Bahujan Samaj Party
27	Akbarpur (SC)	Mayawati/Tribhuvan Dutt	Bahujan Samaj Party
28	Faizabad	Vinay Katiyar	Bharatiya Janata Party
29	Bara Banki (SC)	Ram Sagar	Samajwadi Party
30	Kaiserganj	Beni Prasad Verma	Samajwadi Party
31	Bahraich	Padamsen Chaudhary	Bharatiya Janata Party
32	Balrampur	Rizvan Zaheer	Samajwadi Party
33	Gonda	Brij Bhushan Sharan Singh	Bharatiya Janata Party
34	Basti (SC)	Shriram Chauhan	Bharatiya Janata Party
35	Domariaganj	Rampal Singh	Bharatiya Janata Party
36	Khalilabad	Bhalchandra Yadava	Samajwadi Party
37	Bansgaon (SC)	Raj Narayan Pasi	Bharatiya Janata Party
38	Gorakhpur	Aditya Nath	Bharatiya Janata Party
39	Maharajganj	Kunwar Akhilesh Singh	Samajwadi Party
40	Padrauna	Ram Nagina Mishra	Bharatiya Janata Party
41	Deoria	Prakash Mani Tripathi	Bharatiya Janata Party
42	Salempur	Babban Rajbhar	Bahujan Samaj Party
43	Ballia	Chandra Shekhar	Samajwadi Janata Party
44	Ghosi	Bal Krishna	Bahujan Samaj Party
45	Azamgarh	Ramakant Yadav	Samajwadi Party
46	Lalganj (SC)	Dr. Bali Ram	Bahujan Samaj Party
47	Machlishahr	Chandranath Singh	Samajwadi Party
48	Jaunpur	Chinmayanand	Bharatiya Janata Party
49	Saidpur (SC)	Tufani Saroj	Samajwadi Party
50	Ghazipur	Manoj Sinha	Bharatiya Janata Party
51	Chandauli	Jawahar Lal Jaiswal	Samajwadi Party
52	Varanasi	Shankar Prasad Jaiswal	Bharatiya Janata Party
53	Robertsganj (SC)	Ram Shakal	Bharatiya Janata Party
54	Mirzapur	Phoolan Devi/ Ram Rati Bind	Samajwadi Party
55	Phulpur	Dharam Raj Singh Patel	Samajwadi Party
56	Allahabad	Murli Manohar Joshi	Bharatiya Janata Party
57	Chail (SC)	Suresh Pasi	Bahujan Samaj Party
58	Fatehpur	Ashok Patel	Bharatiya Janata Party
59	Banda	Ram Sajiwan	Bahujan Samaj Party
60	Hamirpur	Ashok Kumar Singh Chandel	Bahujan Samaj Party
61	Jhansi	Sujan Singh Bundela	Indian National Congress
62	Jalaun (SC)	Brij Lal Khabri	Bahujan Samaj Party
63	Ghatampur (Kanpur Dehat) (SC)	Pyare Lal Sankhwar	Bahujan Samaj Party
64	Bilhaur (Kanpur)	Shyam Bihari Misra	Bharatiya Janata Party
65	Kanpur	Shriprakash Jaiswal	Indian National Congress
66	Etawah	Raghuraj Singh Shakya	Samajwadi Party
67	Kannauj	Mulayam Singh / Akhilesh Yadav	Samajwadi Party
68	Farrukhabad	Chandra Bhushan Singh (Munnoo Babu)	Samajwadi Party
69	Mainpuri	Balram Singh Yadav	Samajwadi Party
70	Jalesar	S.P Singh Baghel	Samajwadi Party
71	Etah	Devendra Singh Yadav	Samajwadi Party
72	Firozabad (SC)	Ram Ji Lal Suman	Samajwadi Party
73	Agra	Raj Babbar	Samajwadi Party
74	Mathura	Tejvir Singh	Bharatiya Janata Party
75	Hathras (SC)	Kishan Lal Diler	Bharatiya Janata Party
76	Aligarh	Sheela Gautam	Bharatiya Janata Party
77	Khurja (SC)	Ashok Kumar Pradhan	Bharatiya Janata Party
78	Bulandshahr	Chhatrapal Singh Lodha	Bharatiya Janata Party
79	Hapur	Dr. Ramesh Chand Tomar	Bharatiya Janata Party
80	Meerut	Avtar Singh Bhadana	Indian National Congress
81	Baghpat	Ajit Singh	Rashtriya Lok Dal
82	Muzaffarnagar	Saiduzzaman	Indian National Congress
83	Kairana	Amir Alam	Rashtriya Lok Dal
84	Saharanpur	Mansoor Ali Khan	Bahujan Samaj Party
85	Haridwar (SC)	Harpal Singh Sathi	Bharatiya Janata Party

== West Bengal ==
Keys: CPI(M) (21) AITC (8) INC) (3) CPI (3) RSP (3) BJP (2) AIFB (2)

No.	Constituency	Name of elected M.P.	Party affiliation
1	Cooch Behar (SC)	Amar Roy Pradhan	All India Forward Bloc
2	Alipurduars (ST)	Joachim Baxla	Revolutionary Socialist Party
3	Jalpaiguri	Minati Sen	Communist Party of India
4	Darjeeling	S P Lepcha	Communist Party of India
5	Raiganj	Priya Ranjan Dasmunsi	Indian National Congress
6	Balurghat (SC)	Ranen Barman	Revolutionary Socialist Party (India
7	Malda	A. B. A. Ghani Khan Choudhury	Indian National Congress
8	Jangipur	Abul Hasnat Khan	Communist Party of India
9	Murshidabad	Moinul Hassan	Communist Party of India
10	Behrampore	Adhir Ranjan Chowdhury	Indian National Congress
11	Krishnanagar	Satyabrata Mookherjee	Bharatiya Janata Party
12	Nabadwip (SC)	Anand Mohan Biswas	All India Trinamool Congress
13	Barasat	Dr. Ranjit Kumar Panja	All India Trinamool Congress
14	Basirhat	Ajay Chakraborty	Communist Party of India
15	Jaynagar (SC)	Sanat Kumar Mandal	Revolutionary Socialist Party (India
16	Mathurapur (SC)	Radhika Ranjan Pramanik	Communist Party of India
17	Diamond Harbour	Samik Lahiri	Communist Party of India
18	Jadavpur	Krishna Bose	All India Trinamool Congress
19	Barrackpore	Tarit Baran Topdar	Communist Party of India
20	Dum Dum	Tapan Sikdar	Bharatiya Janata Party
21	Calcutta North West	Sudip Bandyopadhyay	All India Trinamool Congress
22	Calcutta North East	Ajit Kumar Panja	All India Trinamool Congress
23	Calcutta South	Mamata Banerjee	All India Trinamool Congress
24	Howrah	Swadesh Chakrabortty	Communist Party of India
25	Uluberia	Hannan Mollah	Communist Party of India
26	Serampore	Akbor Ali Khandoker	All India Trinamool Congress
27	Hooghly	Rupchand Pal	Communist Party of India
28	Arambagh	Anil Basu	Communist Party of India
29	Panskura	Geeta Mukherjee	Communist Party of India
30	Tamluk	Seth Lakshman Chandra	Communist Party of India
31	Contai	Nitish Sengupta	All India Trinamool Congress
32	Midnapore	Indrajit Gupta	Communist Party of India
33	Jhargram (ST)	Rupchand Murmu	Communist Party of India
34	Purulia	Bir Singh Mahato	All India Forward Bloc
35	Bankura	Acharia Basudeb	Communist Party of India
36	Vishnupur (SC)	Sandhya Bauri	Communist Party of India
37	Durgapur (SC)	Sunil Khan	Communist Party of India
38	Asansol	Bikash Chowdhury	Communist Party of India
39	Burdwan	Nikhilananda Sar	Communist Party of India
40	Katwa	Mahboob Zahedi	Communist Party of India
41	Bolpur	Somnath Chatterjee	Communist Party of India
42	Birbhum (SC)	Ram Chandra Dome	Communist Party of India

== Union Territories ==
=== Andaman and Nicobar Islands ===
Keys: BJP (1)

No.	Constituency	Name of elected M.P.	Party affiliation
1	Andaman and Nicobar Islands	Bishnu Pada Ray	Bharatiya Janata Party

=== Chandigarh ===
Keys: INC (1)

No.	Constituency	Name of elected M.P.	Party affiliation
1	Chandigarh	Pawan Kumar Bansal	Indian National Congress

=== Dadra and Nagar Haveli ===
Keys: Independent (1)

No.	Constituency	Name of elected M.P.	Party affiliation
1	Dadra and Nagar Haveli (ST)	Delkar Mohanbhai Sanjibhai	Independent

=== Daman and Diu ===
Keys: INC (1)

No.	Constituency	Name of elected M.P.	Party affiliation
1	Daman and Diu	Patel Dahyabhai Vallabhbhai	Indian National Congress

=== NCT of Delhi ===
Keys: BJP (7)

No.	Constituency	Name of elected M.P.	Party affiliation
1	Outer Delhi	Sahib Singh Verma	Bharatiya Janata Party
2	Chandni Chowk	Vijay Goel	Bharatiya Janata Party
3	Delhi Sadar	Madan Lal Khurana	Bharatiya Janata Party
4	East Delhi	Lal Bihari Tiwari	Bharatiya Janata Party
5	New Delhi	Jagmohan	Bharatiya Janata Party
6	Karol Bagh (SC)	Anita Arya	Bharatiya Janata Party
7	South Delhi	Vijay Kumar Malhotra	Bharatiya Janata Party

=== Lakshadweep ===
Keys: INC (1)

No.	Constituency	Name of elected M.P.	Party affiliation
1	Lakshadweep (ST)	P M Sayeed	Indian National Congress

=== Puducherry ===
Keys: INC (1)

No.	Constituency	Name of elected M.P.	Party affiliation
1	Pondicherry	M. O. H. Farook	Indian National Congress
