= 1954 Duggirala by-election =

Duggirala by-election 1954
June 1954
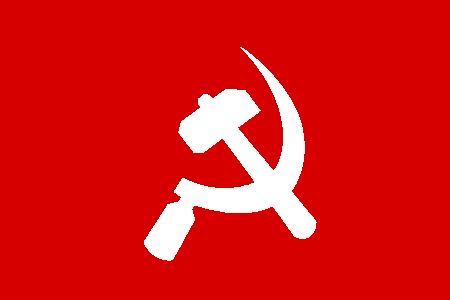
Candidate	Meduri Nageswara Rao	L.B.G. Rao
Party	INC	CPI
Popular vote	21,913 votes	20,644 votes
Percentage	45.0%	42.5%

In June 1954 a by-election was held in for the Duggirala seat of the Legislative Assembly of the Indian state of Andhra Pradesh. The by-election was called after the death of the sitting MLA A. Rami Reddi. The election was won by the Indian National Congress candidate Meduri Nageswara Rao, won obtained 21,913 votes (45%). L.B.G. Rao of the Communist Party of India finished in second place with 20,644 votes (42.5%). Ancha Venkateswarlu of the Krishikar Lok Party obtained 5,735 votes (11.7%). There was also an independent candidate in the election, M.R. Rao, who obtained 395 votes (0.8%).
