= Duggirala Assembly constituency =

Defunct Legislative Assembly constituency in Andhra Pradesh, India

Coordinates: 16.33°N 80.63°E

Duggirala
- Former constituency for the Andhra Pradesh Legislative Assembly

Constituency details
- Country: India
- Region: South India
- State: Andhra Pradesh
- District: Guntur
- Lok Sabha constituency: Tenali
- Established: 1951
- Abolished: 2008
- Total electors: 121,878
- Reservation: None

Duggirala was one of the 294 Legislative Assembly constituencies of Andhra Pradesh in India. It was in Guntur district and was dissolved before the 2009 elections, with most of its area now in Tenali Assembly constituency, Mangalagiri Assembly constituency and Repalle Assembly constituency.

== History of the constituency ==
The Duggirala constituency was first created for the Madras state Legislative Assembly in 1952. After the passing of the States Reorganisation Act, 1956, it became a part of the new Andhra Pradesh Legislative Assembly. After the passing of the Delimitation of Parliamentary and Assembly Constituencies Order, 1976, its extent was the Duggirala, Kollipar and Kollur firkas in Tenali taluk of Guntur district.

It was not present in the Delimitation of Parliamentary and Assembly Constituencies Order, 2008 and hence was defunct as of the 2009 Andhra Pradesh Legislative Assembly election.

== Members of Legislative Assembly ==
Election	MLA	Party
1952 (Note: for Madras State)	A. Rami Reddy	Indian National Congress
1954^	M. Nageswara Rao	Indian National Congress
1955 (Note: for Andhra State)	Putumbaka Sriramulu	Indian National Congress
1962	Lankireddy Lakshma Reddy	Indian National Congress
1967	A. Rami Reddy	Independent politician
1972	Bontu Gopala Reddy	Indian National Congress
1978	G.Vedantha Rao	Indian National Congress
1983	M.V Sivarama Krishna Reddy	Independent politician
1985	Alapati Dharma Rao	Indian National Congress
1989	Gudibandi Venkata Reddy	Indian National Congress
1994	Gudibandi Venkata Reddy	Indian National Congress
1999	Gudibandi Venkata Reddy	Indian National Congress
2004	Gudibandi Venkata Reddy	Indian National Congress

^ indicates by-election

== Election results ==
=== 2004 ===
2004 Andhra Pradesh Legislative Assembly election: Duggirala
Party	Candidate	Votes	%	±%
INC	Gudibandi Venkata Reddy	54,257	54.92	
TDP	Chandu Sambasivarao	42,461	42.98	
Majority		11,796	11.94	
Turnout		98,789	81.05	
Registered electors		121,878		
INC hold		Swing		

=== 1999 ===
1999 Andhra Pradesh Legislative Assembly election: Duggirala
Party	Candidate	Votes	%	±%
INC	Gudibandi Venkata Reddy	46,714	49.51	
TDP	Kotaru Koteswara Rao	46,202	48.97	
Anna Telugu Desam Party	Mikkilineni Ravindra Babu	976	1.03	
Majority		512	0.54	
Turnout		94,349	70.18	
Registered electors		137,081		
INC hold		Swing		

=== 1994 ===
1994 Andhra Pradesh Legislative Assembly election: Duggirala
Party	Candidate	Votes	%	±%
INC	Gudibandi Venkata Reddy	41,930	49.51	
TDP	Kotaru Koteswara Rao	39,117	47.97	
Majority		2,713	2.04	
Turnout		94,349	70.18	
Registered electors		135,081		
INC hold		Swing		

=== 1989 ===
1989 Andhra Pradesh Legislative Assembly election: Duggirala
Party	Candidate	Votes	%	±%
INC	Gudibandi Venkata Reddy	51,944	51.94	
TDP	Mareddy Balkoteswara Reddy	40,564	40.56	
Majority		11,380	11.04	
Turnout		100,349	75.18	
Registered electors		123,081		
INC hold		Swing		

=== 1985 ===
1985 Andhra Pradesh Legislative Assembly election: Duggirala
Party	Candidate	Votes	%	±%
INC	Alapati Dharma Rao	43,617	43.61	
TDP	Bandaru Issac Prabhakar	32,320	32.32	
Majority		11,380	11.2	
Turnout		87,349	72.18	
Registered electors		111,081		
INC gain from		Swing		

=== 1983 ===
1983 Andhra Pradesh Legislative Assembly election: Duggirala
Party	Candidate	Votes	%	±%
Independent	Mareddy Venkata Sivarama Krishna Reddy	43,252	43.2	
INC	Gollapudi Vendanta Rao	14,310	14.32	
Majority		28,942	29.2	
Turnout		84,349	70.18	
Registered electors		90,081		
Independent Politician gain from		Swing		

=== 1978 ===
1978 Andhra Pradesh Legislative Assembly election: Duggirala
Party	Candidate	Votes	%	±%
INC(I)	Gollapudi Vendanta Rao	31,843	43.2	
CPI(M)	Gudibandi Nagi Reddy	30,773	41.32	
Majority		1,070	1.92	
Turnout		74,349	70.18	
Registered electors		84,081		
INC(I) gain from		Swing		

=== 1972 ===
In 1972, Duggirala legislative assembly constituency had total 80100 electors. Total number of valid vote was 54218. Indian National Congress candidate Bontu Gopala Reddy won and became MLA from this seat. He secured total 36789 votes. Indian National Congress (organisation) candidate Krishnamurti Pasupuletl stood second with total 12213 votes. He lost by 24576 votes.

1972 Andhra Pradesh Legislative Assembly election: Duggirala
Party	Candidate	Votes	%	±%
INC	Bonthu Gopala Reddy	36,789	67.85	
INC(O)	Pasupuleti Krishnamurti	12,213	22.53	
Majority		24,576	45.32	
Turnout		70,349	70.18	
Registered electors		78,081		
INC gain from		Swing		

=== 1967 ===
1967 Andhra Pradesh Legislative Assembly election: Duggirala
Party	Candidate	Votes	%	±%
Independent	A.Ramiredddy	22,866	50.02	
INC	Pasupuleti Krishnamurti	22,185	49.32	
Majority		681	0.7	
Turnout		55,349	70.18	
Registered electors		65,081		
Independent Politician gain from		Swing		

=== 1962 ===
1962 Andhra Pradesh Legislative Assembly election: Duggirala
Party	Candidate	Votes	%	±%
INC	Lankireddy Lakshma Reddy	22,629	50.02	
Independent	Katragadda Narayana Rao	20,322	45.32	
Majority		2,307	4.7	
Turnout		49,349	70.18	
Registered electors		57,081		
INC hold		Swing		

=== 1955 ===
1955 Andhra Pradesh Legislative Assembly election: Duggirala
Party	Candidate	Votes	%	±%
INC	M.Narayana Rao	21,913	50.02	
Independent	L.B.G.Rao	20,644	47.32	
Majority		1,269	2.7	
Turnout		42,349	70.18	
Registered electors		49,081		
INC hold		Swing		

=== 1955 ===
1955 Andhra Pradesh Legislative Assembly election: Duggirala
Party	Candidate	Votes	%	±%
INC	Putumbaka Sriramulu	28,945	50.02	
CPI	Vurabandi Acharyulu	18,364	35.32	
Majority		10,581	14.7	
Turnout		46,349	70.18	
Registered electors		50,081		
INC hold		Swing		

=== 1952 ===
1952 Madras Legislative Assembly election: Duggirala
Party	Candidate	Votes	%	±%
INC	A.Ramireddy	19,002	41.63	
CPI	K. Kotaiah	17,367	38.04	
KLP	M. Narasimha Rao	6,120	13.41	
Independent	B. Balayogi	1,920	4.21	
Independent	A. Simon	690	1.51	
Independent	P. Yesuratnam	551	1.21	
Margin of victory		1,635	3.58	
Turnout		45,650	77.55	
Registered electors		58,862		
INC win (new seat)				

== See also ==
- List of constituencies of the Andhra Pradesh Legislative Assembly
- Guntur district
