= P. Shiv Shankar =

Indian politician

Punjala Shiv Shankar
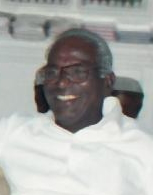

12th Governor of Kerala
- In office 12 November 1995 – 1 May 1996
- Chief Minister: A. K. Antony
- Preceded by: B. Rachaiah
- Succeeded by: Khurshid Alam Khan

8th Governor of Sikkim
- In office 21 September 1994 – 11 November 1995
- Chief Minister: Sanchaman Limboo; Pawan Kumar Chamling
- Preceded by: Radhakrishna Hariram Tahiliani
- Succeeded by: K. V. Raghunatha Reddy (Additional charge)

12th Minister of Law and Justice
- In office 25 July 1987 – 14 February 1988
- Prime Minister: Rajiv Gandhi
- Preceded by: Ashoke Kumar Sen
- Succeeded by: Bindeshwari Dubey
- In office 14 January 1980 – 15 January 1982
- Prime Minister: Indira Gandhi
- Preceded by: S. N. Kacker
- Succeeded by: Jagannath Kaushal

14th Minister of External Affairs
- In office 12 May 1986 – 22 October 1986
- Prime Minister: Rajiv Gandhi
- Preceded by: Bali Ram Bhagat
- Succeeded by: N. D. Tiwari

10th Minister of Power
- In office 2 September 1982 – 31 December 1984
- Prime Minister: Indira Gandhi
- Preceded by: K. C. Pant
- Succeeded by: B. Shankaranand

20th Minister of Petroleum
- In office 15 January 1982 – 31 December 1984
- Prime Minister: Indira Gandhi
- Preceded by: P. C. Sethi
- Succeeded by: Naval K. Sharma

Personal details
- Born: 10 August 1929 Mamidipalli, Hyderabad State, British Raj
- Died: 27 February 2017 (aged 87) Hyderabad, Telangana, India
- Party: Indian National Congress (till 2008, 2011 until his death); Praja Rajyam Party (2008–2011)
- Spouse: Dr. P. Lakshmibai
- Children: 2 sons and 1 daughter
- Education: Hindu College, Amritsar Osmania University

Punjala Shiv Shankar (10 August 1929 – 27 February 2017) was an Indian politician. He served as the Minister of External Affairs, Law, and Petroleum. He was a very influential minister in Indira Gandhi's and Rajiv Gandhi's cabinets and was one of the most senior politicians in India. He also served as Governor of Sikkim from 1994 to 1995 and Governor of Kerala from 1995 to 1996.

== Personal life ==
P. Shiv Shankar was born during the British Raj on 10 August 1929 in a Munnuru Kapu family in Mamidipalli, District of Hyderabad (Now in Telangana, India) to the Late Shri P. Bashiah. He studied B.A. at Hindu College, Amritsar and LL.B. at Law College, Osmania University, Hyderabad. He was married to Dr. (Smt.) P. Lakshmibai on 2 June 1955. He has two sons and one daughter.

== Career ==
P. Shiv Shankar worked to serve the poor and worked for the welfare of his country. He was a judge in the Andhra Pradesh High Court during 1974 and 1975.

He was elected to 6th Lok Sabha from Secunderabad in 1979. He was a member of the Indian National Congress political party. He was re-elected from same constituency in 1980. He was made Law Minister in Third Indira Gandhi Ministry in 1980.

Shiv Shankar had held several positions in the Government, however, it was his stint as the Union Law Minister in Indira Gandhi Cabinet, after her return to power in 1980, which was the turning point in India's judiciary.

As Union Law Minister, Shiv Shankar was responsible for the issue of circulars, attempting to transfer judges. On 18 March 1981, Shiv Shankar, as the Law Minister, addressed a circular to the governors and chief ministers of all States requesting them to elicit from additional judges their agreement to be transferred to any high court.

The reasons mentioned in the circular were that such a policy of transfer would help national integration, combat narrow and parochial tendencies like caste, kinship, and other local considerations.

But the circular was largely seen as an expression of no-confidence in the judiciary and a device to punish the inconvenient judges. Granville Austin, in his Working A Democratic Constitution: The Indian Experience (1999), said about the circular: "This threw kerosene on existing flames when it became public knowledge in mid-April (1981) that the circular asked the recipients to obtain from the additional judges in the state’s high court ‘their consent to be appointed permanent judges in any other high court (they might indicate three courts in order of preference) and to obtain from potential judges ‘their consent to be appointed to any other high court in the country.’"

The written consents and preferences were to be sent to Shiv Shankar within two weeks.

In the Lok Sabha, Shiv Shankar asked if the independence of the Judiciary meant "touch-me-not".

He seemed to confirm that he sent the circular without consulting the then Chief Justice of India, Y.V.Chandrachud. What happened thereafter is history. On 30 December 1981, the Supreme Court's seven Judge bench gave its decision in S.P. Gupta vs Union of India, in which the Court held that Shiv Shankar's circular was not unconstitutional, because it had no legal force in the first place.

In his book, Austin refers to different perceptions of Shiv Shankar during this period. One school of thought believed that he intended to reduce judicial independence, and he carefully avoided recommending for appointment judges unfriendly to Mrs.Gandhi, the then Prime Minister. Another body of opinion, Austin notes, held that his circular was not intended to intimidate judges into ruling in favour of the government.

Shiv Shankar was not averse to ‘shaking up’ judges partly to caution them when considering the government's interest, but his principal motivation seems to have been in class and caste consciousness.

As Austin puts it: "To him, judges were intellectuals or Brahmins, or from the newly strong economic castes and classes-the upper reaches of the Other Backward Classes – whose monopoly had to be broken, so that lower-ranking members of the OBCs and Scheduled Castes and Tribes could ‘thrive’ as advocates and find their way to the bench".

Austin adds that Shiv Shankar believed that Chief Justices of High courts showed caste preferences in selecting colleagues and in deciding cases, and transfers might ameliorate this because outside judges would have no local roots.

Austin also records a personal element which motivated Shiv Shankar. "A self-made man from the Kapu community in Andhra Pradesh (a large community of agriculturists and upper caste), he thought the Reddy community dominated the high court there, and he had resigned from the high court when he thought a Reddy Judge had denied him the chief justiceship." Shiv Shankar was a Judge in Andhra Pradesh High Court between 1974 and 1975, before he plunged into politics.

In 1985, P. Shiv Shankar was elected to Rajya Sabha from Gujarat and remained in Rajya Sabha till 1993 for two terms. He was Minister of External Affairs and Minister of Human Resource Development during these terms. He was deputy chairman of Planning Commission from 1987 to 1988. Then, P. Shiv Shankar became Leader of the House in Rajya Sabha from 1988 to 1989. After that, he served as Leader of the Opposition in Rajya Sabha during 1989 and 1991.

P. Shiv Shankar was sworn in as Governor of Sikkim on 21 September 1994. He remained in the post till 11 November 1995. He also was Governor of Kerala from 1995 to 1996.

In 1998 General elections, P. Shiv Shankar contested election from Tenali constituency, he defeated incumbent M.P. Sarada Tadiparthi of Telugu Desam Party and was elected to Lok Sabha.

In 2004, P. Shiv Shankar left the Congress party because he had alleged that party tickets in Andhra Pradesh were being sold. There was no response to either his resignation or the allegations made by him. In 2008, he joined Praja Rajyam Party formed by Telugu film actor Chiranjeevi. In August 2011, Praja Rajyam Party merged with Congress. He died on 27 February 2017, aged 87.

== Death ==
Punjala Shiv Shankar died at his residence in Jubilee Hills on 27 February 2017 due to age-related health issues. He was survived by his wife Laxmi, 2 sons ( Late Sudheer Kumar Ex Mla, Dr P.Vinay Kumar) and a daughter Jalaja.

Lok Sabha
Preceded by M M Hashim	Member of Parliament for Secunderabad; 1979 – 1984	Succeeded by T. Anjaiah
Preceded by Sarada Tadiparthi	Member of Parliament for Tenali; 1998 – 1999	Succeeded by Ummareddy Venkateswarlu
Political offices
Preceded by Bali Ram Bhagat	Minister of Law and Justice; 1980 - 1982	Succeeded by Jagannath Kaushal
Preceded by Hans Raj Khanna	Minister for External Affairs; 1986 - 1986	Succeeded by Narayan Dutt Tiwari
Preceded by Radhakrishna Hariram Tahiliani	Governor of Sikkim; 21 September 1994 – 11 November 1995	Succeeded by K. V. Raghunatha Reddy
Preceded by B. Rachaiah	Governor of Kerala; 12 November 1995 – 1 May 1996	Succeeded by Khurshed Alam Khan
