= Laxmi Das =

Indian politician (1918–1985)

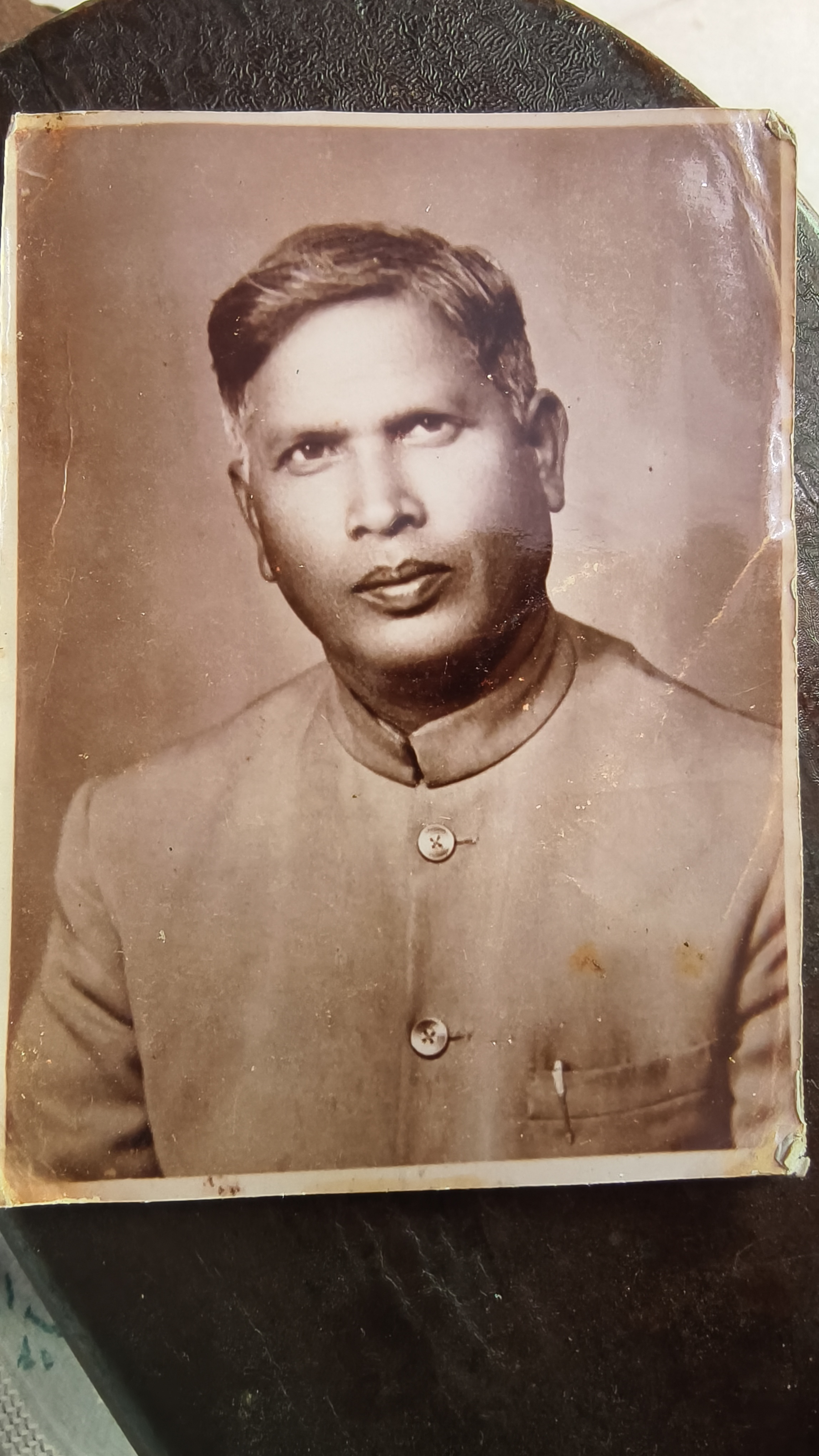

Member of Parliament, Lok Sabha
- In office 1962-1967
- Preceded by: Constituency established
- Succeeded by: G. S. Reddi
- Constituency: Miryalguda

Personal details
- Born: 1 May 1918 Hyderabad, British India (presently Telangana, India)
- Died: 20 June 1985 (aged 67) Hyderabad, India
- Party: Communist Party of India
- Spouse: Laxmamma

Laxmi Das (1 May 1918 – 20 June 1985) was an Indian politician and a trade union leader. He was a Member of Parliament, representing Miryalguda in the 3rd Lok Sabha, the lower house of India's Parliament, as a member of the Communist Party of India.

== Political career ==
Laxmi Das started his career as a trade union leader in 1938. He founded and represented many trade unions before entering electoral politics. He was one of the founders of All Hyderabad Trade Union Congress in 1946 and was also a member of its working committee. He was also one of founders of Hyderabad Municipal Employees Union & Hyderabad Highways Employees Union in 1946 and served as General Secretary of both the Unions. He observed a week-long Hunger strike for redressal of demands of Highways Employees Union, Andhra Pradesh in December 1958. He also served as the President of Andhra Pradesh Highways Employees Union, Secretary of Naganjuna Sagar Employees Union and Vice-President of P.W.D. Ministries Union and Agricultural Farms Employees Union.

Laxmi Das took active part in the Independence movement and especially struggled in the movement for joining the erstwhile Hyderabad State with the Indian Union during which he suffered imprisonment from 1947 to 1948. In 1942, he assumed the role of Secretary for both the Andhra Mahasabha and the Communist Party. He served as Member, General Council of All India Trade Union Congress from 1956 to 1958 and Andhra Pradesh Communist Council in 1959. He unsuccessfully contested the 1957 Indian general election from Karimnagar Lok Sabha constituency as a People's Democratic Front (a pseudonym for the banned Communist Party of India) candidate.

Laxmi Das got elected as a Member of Parliament in the 3rd Lok Sabha representing Miryalguda from 1962 to 1967.

== Personal life ==
Laxmi Das was born in Hyderabad on 1 May 1918. He was the son of Late Shri P. Laxmi Pathy. He married Laxmamma in April 1936. The Couple had 3 sons and 3 daughters.

Das died in Hyderabad on 20 June 1985, at the age of 67.
