= Baddam Narsimha Reddy =

Indian politician (1931–2017)

Dr.B.N.Reddy

Member of Parliament, Lok Sabha
- In office 1996–1999
- Preceded by: Bheemireddy Narsimha Reddy
- Succeeded by: Jaipal Reddy
- Constituency: Miryalguda
- In office 1989–1991
- Preceded by: Bheemireddy Narasimha Reddy
- Succeeded by: Bheemireddy Narasimha Reddy
- Constituency: Miryalguda

Personal details
- Born: 21 June 1931 Nakrekal, Nalgonda District, Telangana, India
- Died: 6 November 2017 (aged 86) Hyderabad, Telangana, India
- Party: Indian National Congress
- Spouse: Alivelu
- Children: 1 son, 3 daughters

Baddam Narsimha Reddy (21 June 1931 – 6 November 2017) was an Indian politician and a leader of the Indian National Congress from Andhra Pradesh. He served as member of the Lok Sabha representing Miryalguda (Lok Sabha constituency). He was elected to 9th, 11th and 12th Lok Sabha. Reddy died on 6 November 2017, at the age of 86.
