= Meduri Nageswara Rao =

Indian independence activist and politician

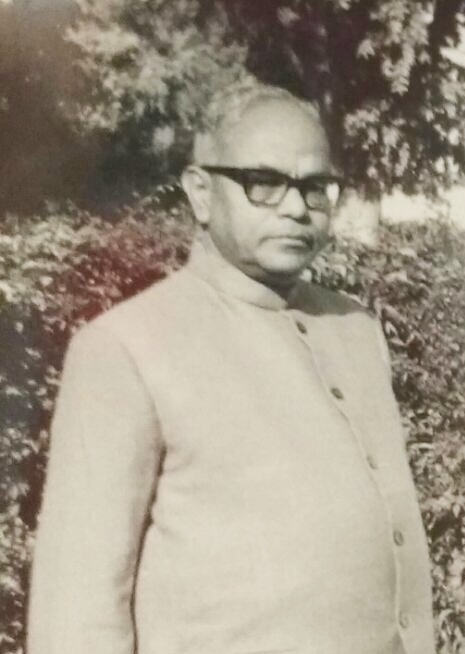

MP
- Constituency: Machilipatnam and Tenali

Personal details
- Born: 31 March 1910 Etukur, Guntur district
- Died: 13 January 1998 (aged 87)
- Party: Indian National Congress
- Spouse: Musalamma
- Children: 4

Meduri Nageswara Rao (31 March 1910 – 13 January 1998) was an Indian independence activist, politician and Member of Parliament.

== Life sketch ==
He was born to Shri Venkatrayadu in Etukur, Guntur district on 31 March 1910. He was educated at A.E.L.M. High School. He married Smt. Musalamma in 1930. They had four children; two sons and two daughters. He left studies and participated in Salt Satyagraha in 1930. He was jailed in Vellore and Alipur.

He was member of Pradesh Congress Committee between 1936 and 1971 and Secretary of Guntur District Congress Committee for 10 years between 1937 and 1947. He was Chairman of Guntur Zilla Parishad for three terms between 1959 and 1970. He was member of Indian Council of Agricultural Research between 1951 and 1952. He was elected as member of Madras Legislative Assembly in 1946 and Andhra Pradesh Legislative Assembly in 1954 and 1956.

He was elected to the 5th Lok Sabha from Machilipatnam constituency in 1971 as a member of Indian National Congress. He was again elected to the 6th Lok Sabha and 7th Lok Sabha from Tenali constituency in 1977 and 1980 respectively.

He was felicitated and Sahasra Purna Chandrodayam celebrated in 1994 under the chairmanship of Kotla Vijaya Bhaskara Reddy.

He died on 13 January 1998.
