= Nandipaku Venkataswamy =

Indian politician

Nandipaku Venkataswamy is an Indian politician from Bharatiya Janata Party who served as Member of 13th Lok Sabha from Tirupati Lok Sabha constituency and State Vice President of Bharatiya Janta Party of Andhra Pradesh. He is the only winner of Bharatiya Janata Party from Tirupati Lok Sabha constituency. In 1999 Indian general election in Andhra Pradesh, he defeated Indian National Congress by a thin margin.

== Personal life ==
He was born on 5 June 1931 in Chittoor and married D. Savithri on 15 May 1963. He died in 2012.
