= L. B. G. Rao =

Personal details
- Born: Lavu Bala Gangadhara Rao; August 3, 1921
- Died: March 28, 2003 (aged 81)
- Occupation: politician

Lavu Balagangadhara Rao (3 August 1921 – 28 March 2003) was an Indian politician. He served as the Secretary of the Andhra Pradesh State Committee of the Communist Party of India (Marxist) between May 1985 and November 1991.

L.B.G. Rao was the son of Lavu Subrahmanyam. He studied at the Andhra-Christian College in Guntur. In 1938, during his student days, he joined the Communist Party of India. In 1942 he became a CPI whole-timer. He went underground and was active in the Telangana armed struggle. He led various guerrilla squads, acting as the Amarabad party secretary. He got married in 1947, whilst being underground. In total he would go underground five times in his life, spanning a period of over eleven years. He was also jailed three times, and spent two and a half years in prison.

L.B.G. Rao was fielded as the CPI candidate in a by-election for the Duggirala seat in the Andhra Pradesh Legislative Assembly in June 1954. He finished in second place with 20,644 votes (42.5% of the votes in the constituency).

After the split in the CPI, L.B.G. Rao sided with the CPI(M). He became a Central Committee member of CPI(M). As of 1979 he served as the secretary of the State Agricultural Labourers Union. He also served as president of the All India Agricultural Workers Union. L.B.G. Rao stood as the CPI(M) candidate for the Tenali seat in the 1980 Indian general election. He finished in second place, with 144,457 votes (32.70%). In 1989 he was included in the Polit Bureau of the party. Due to old age, he retired from the Polit Bureau in 1998.
