= Manne Srinivas Reddy =

Member of the 17th Lok Sabha

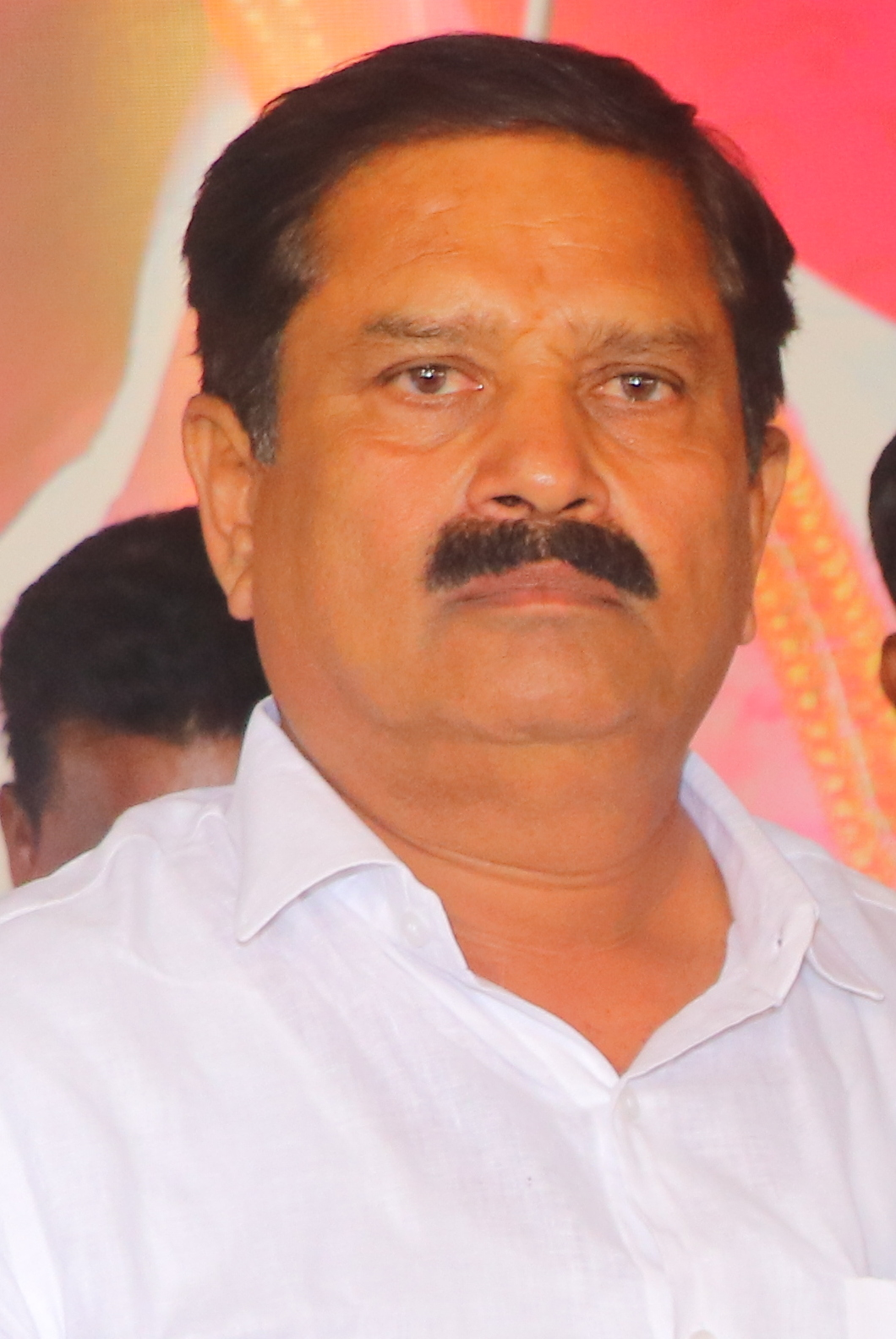

Member of Parliament, Lok Sabha
- In office 23 May 2019 – 4 June 2024
- Preceded by: A. P. Jithender Reddy
- Succeeded by: D. K. Aruna
- Constituency: Mahbubnagar

Personal details
- Born: 2 January 1959 (age 67) Mahbubnagar, Andhra Pradesh (Presently Telangana)
- Party: Bharat Rashtra Samithi
- Spouse: Manne Geetha Reddy

Manne Srinivas Reddy is an Indian politician. He was elected to the Lok Sabha, lower house of the Parliament of India from Mahbubnagar, Telangana in the 2019 Indian general election as member of the Bharat Rashtra Samithi.

In the 2019 elections BRS candidate Manne Srinivas Reddy had won the Mahbubnagar parliament constituency with a majority of 77,829 votes and lost his seat in the 2024 Lok Sabha elections.
