= Narmetta =

Narmetta Jonnala Narmetta
- village
- Nickname: Nadi Metta
- Location in Telangana, India Narmetta (India)
- Coordinates: 17°53′10″N 79°09′40″E
- Country: India
- State: Telangana
- District: Jangaon
- Talukas: Narmetta

Population (2011)
  - Total: 42 374

Languages
  - Official: Telugu
- Time zone: UTC+5:30 (IST)
- Postal code: 506175
- Vehicle registration: TS 27
- Website: telangana.gov.in

Narmetta is a village and a mandal in Jangaon district in the state of Telangana in India.

== Panchayats ==
The village panchayats in Narmetta mandal include Veldanda, Agapet, Ammapuram, Bommakur, Ippalagadda, Gandiramaram, Gunturpally, Hanmantapur, Kanneboinagudem, Malkapet and Machupahad.

== Notable people ==
- Former MLA Nimma Raja Reddy was from Narmetta Mandal, Veldanda Village.
