= Sahasra Purna Chandrodayam =

Hindu celebration on the 1000th full moon

Sahasra Purna Chandrodayam (or Sahasra Chandra Darshan) is the celebration of a person's 1000th full moon during his or her life as a special occasion. This is a Hindu custom in India. The time between similar lunar phases, the synodic month, is on average 29.53 days, and thus 1000 moons equals 29530 days = 80.849 years = approximately 80 years, 10 months on the Western calendar. In practice the celebration traditionally is held 3 full moons before a person's 81st Birthday. This ritual is also known as Sahasra Chandra Darshan (सहस्र-(पूर्ण)चन्द्र-दर्शन) or Chandra Ratharohan The ritual is to provide mental and physical strength in his/her old age and to encourage him/her to pursue spiritual liberation from all problems in this life.

In Sanskrit sahasra means 1000, purna means full, and chandrodayam means dawn of moon.

A similar kind of celebrations for elderly persons are

- Completion of 60 years - Shashthipurti (or Shashtyabdapurti)
- Completion of 77 years, 7 months, 7 days - Bhimaratharohana or Bhima Ratha Shanti
- Completion of 88 years 8 months, 8 days - Devaratharohana or Deva Ratha Shanti
- Completion of 99 years, 9 months, 9 days - Divyaratharohana or Divya Ratha Shanti
- Completion of 105 years 8 months, 8 days - Mahadivyaratharohana or Mahadivya Ratha Shanti
