= A. P. Jithender Reddy =

Indian politician

Member of Parliament, Lok Sabha
- In office 16 May 2014 – 23 May 2019
- Preceded by: K. Chandrasekhar Rao
- Succeeded by: Manne Srinivas Reddy
- Constituency: Mahbubnagar
- In office 6 October 1999 – 16 May 2004
- Preceded by: S. Jaipal Reddy
- Succeeded by: D. Vittal Rao
- Constituency: Mahbubnagar

Personal details
- Born: 26 June 1954 (age 72) Nagar Kurnool, Telangana
- Party: Indian National Congress
- Other political affiliations: Bharat Rashtra Samithi; Bharatiya Janata Party
- Spouse: Smt. A.P. Rajeshwari Reddy
- Children: 3
- Education: Osmania University
- As of 17 December, 2016

A. P. Jithender Reddy (born 26 June 1954 in Pedda Amudyalapadu Village, Mahbubnagar district) is an Indian politician from Telangana. He was the Member of Parliament of Mahbubnagar from Telangana Rashtra Samithi Party in Telangana. He won the 2014 Indian general election being a Bharat Rashtra Samithi candidate.

In June 2019, Reddy along with Telugu Desam Party leader E. Peddi Reddy, D. K. Aruna, who served as a Minister in undivided Andhra Pradesh and former Congress MLC, P. Sudhakar Reddy joined the Bharatiya Janata Party.

Jithender Reddy joined Congress ahead of national elections on 15 March 2024 after he was denied parliament ticket was and appointed as advisor to the government and special representative in Delhi.

A.P. Jithender Reddy was elected as president of the Telangana Olympic Association (TOA) on 10 December 2024.

== Electoral History ==
=== Lok Sabha ===
Year	Constituency	Party	Votes	%	Opponent	Party	Votes	%	Result	Margin	%
1996	Mahbubnagar	NTDP	53,594	7.38	Mallikarjun	INC	2,59,875	35.79	Lost	-2,06,281	-28.41
1998	Mahbubnagar	BJP	2,06,834	27.69	S. Jaipal Reddy	JD	2,78,302	37.25	Lost	-71,468	-9.56
1999	Mahbubnagar	BJP	3,91,588	49.46	Dr. Mallikarjun	INC	3,40,693	43.03	Won	+50,895	+6.43
2009	Chevella	TDP	4,02,275	37.08	Jaipal Reddy Sudini	INC	4,20,807	38.78	Lost	-18,532	-1.70
2014	Mahbubnagar	TRS	3,34,228	32.91	Jaipal Reddy Sudini	INC	3,31,638	32.66	Won	+2,590	+0.25

Party political offices
Preceded by K. Chandrasekhar Rao	Leader of the Telangana Rashtra Samithi Party in the Lok Sabha; 2014–present	Incumbent
