= Jaipal Reddy =

Indian politician (1942–2019)

Sudini Jaipal Reddy
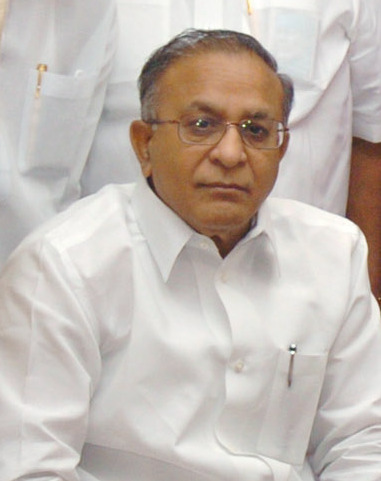
- Jaipal Reddy in 2007

7th Leader of the Opposition in Rajya Sabha
- In office 22 July 1991 – 29 June 1992
- Vice President: Shankar Dayal Sharma
- Preceded by: M. S. Gurupadaswamy
- Succeeded by: Sikander Bakht

17th Union Minister of Science and Technology
- In office 29 October 2012 – 18 May 2014
- Prime Minister: Manmohan Singh
- Preceded by: Vayalar Ravi
- Succeeded by: Jitendra Singh

6th Union Minister of Earth Sciences
- In office 19 October 2012 – 18 May 2014
- Prime Minister: Manmohan Singh
- Preceded by: Vayalar Ravi
- Succeeded by: Jitendra Singh

38th Union Minister of Petroleum & Natural Gas
- In office 19 January 2011 – 28 October 2012
- Prime Minister: Manmohan Singh
- Preceded by: Murli Deora
- Succeeded by: Veerappa Moily

35th Union Minister of Urban Development
- In office 18 November 2005 – 19 January 2011
- Prime Minister: Manmohan Singh
- Preceded by: Manmohan Singh
- Succeeded by: Kamal Nath

4th Union Minister of Culture
- In office 23 May 2004 – 29 January 2006
- Prime Minister: Manmohan Singh
- Preceded by: Jagmohan
- Succeeded by: Ambika Soni

23rd Union Minister of Information & Broadcasting
- In office 23 May 2004 – 18 November 2005
- Prime Minister: Manmohan Singh
- Preceded by: Ravi Shankar Prasad
- Succeeded by: Priya Ranjan Dasmunsi
- In office 1 May 1997 – 19 March 1998
- Prime Minister: Inder Kumar Gujral
- Preceded by: C. M. Ibrahim
- Succeeded by: Sushma Swaraj

Member of Parliament, Rajya Sabha
- In office 29 September 1997 – 2 March 1998
- Preceded by: N. Giri Prasad
- Succeeded by: Yadlapati Venkata Rao
- Constituency: Andhra Pradesh
- In office 10 April 1990 – 9 April 1996
- Preceded by: Puttapaga Radhakrishna
- Succeeded by: Yalamanchili Radhakrishna Murthy
- Constituency: Andhra Pradesh

Member of Parliament, Lok Sabha
- In office 16 May 2009 – 16 May 2014
- Preceded by: Constituency Established
- Succeeded by: Konda Vishweshwar Reddy
- Constituency: Chevella
- In office 6 October 1999 – 16 May 2009
- Preceded by: Baddam Narsimha Reddy
- Succeeded by: Constituency Dissolved
- Constituency: Miryalguda
- In office 10 March 1998 – 26 April 1999
- Preceded by: Mallikarjun Goud
- Succeeded by: A. P. Jithender Reddy
- Constituency: Mahbubnagar
- In office 1984–1989
- Preceded by: Mallikarjun Goud
- Succeeded by: Mallikarjun Goud
- Constituency: Mahbubnagar

Member of Legislative Assembly Andhra Pradesh
- In office 1969–1984
- Preceded by: G Reddy
- Succeeded by: J.Chittaranjan Das
- Constituency: Kalwakurthy

Personal details
- Born: 16 January 1942 Narmetta, Hyderabad State, British India (now Narmetta, Nalgonda, Telangana, India)
- Died: 28 July 2019 (aged 77) Hyderabad, Telangana, India
- Party: Indian National Congress (1969-1978) (1999-2019)
- Other political affiliations: Janata Dal (1985-1998); Janata Party (1978-1984)
- Spouse: Lakshmi
- Children: 2 sons and 1 daughter
- Occupation: Farmer
- Profession: Politician
- Cabinet: Gujral ministry (1997-1998); First Manmohan Singh ministry (2004-2009); Second Manmohan Singh ministry (2009-2014)
- Portfolio: 1. Ministry of Information and Broadcasting; 2. Ministry of Culture; 3. Ministry of Urban Development; 4. Ministry of Petroleum and Natural Gas; 5. Ministry of Earth Sciences; 6. Ministry of Science and Technology
- Website: sjaipalreddy.com

Sudini Jaipal Reddy (16 January 1942 – 28 July 2019) was an Indian politician who was the Member of Parliament in the Lok Sabha of India for five terms. He represented the Chevella constituency of Telangana and was a member of the Indian National Congress. He served as a Union Minister for Information and Broadcasting in the I. K. Gujral cabinet in 1998. In 1999 he returned to Indian National Congress after 21 years. In 2004 he was re-elected to 14th Lok Sabha from Miryalaguda Lok Sabha Constituency and then he served as a Union Minister for Information and Broadcasting and Union Minister for Urban Development in the United Progressive Alliance-1. In 2009 he was re-elected to the 15th Lok Sabha from the Chevella constituency and served as a Union Minister for Urban Development and Union Minister for Petroleum and Natural Gas. He was the Union Minister for the Ministry of Earth Sciences and the Ministry of Science and Technology from 29 October 2012 to 18 May 2014.

== Personal life ==
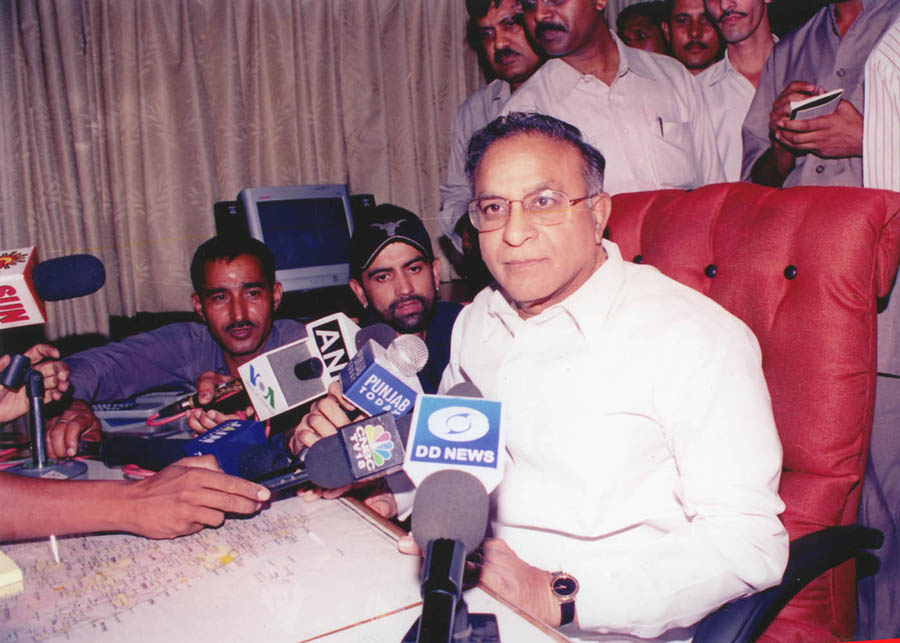
Jaipal Reddy in his office after taking charge as the Union Minister of Information & Broadcasting in New Delhi on 24 May 2004

Reddy was born in Nermatta, a village in Chandur Mandal in Nalgonda District in Telangana State but is actually from Madgula, Mahabub Nagar district (now Ranga Reddy District) in Telangana. He had been polio-stricken since he was 18-months old, and used crutches to walk.

He had an M.A. from the Osmania University, Hyderabad. He had been an agriculturist. He married Lakshmi on 7 May 1960. The couple had two sons and one daughter.

== Career ==
Reddy was a student leader during his college life and in 1970s he joined the Indian National Congress. He became an MLA of Kalwakurthy in Andhra Pradesh.

Reddy was an MLA of Kalwakurthy between 1969 and 1984, a constituency in Andhra Pradesh for four terms. He quit his membership of the Congress Party to protest against the emergency and joined the Janata Party in 1977 and later on its splinter Janata Dal. He was the general secretary of the Janata Party from 1985 to 1988. He was elected to the 8th Lok Sabha in 1984 from Mahbubnagar Lok Sabha. He rejoined the Congress Party in 1999 and was elected to the 14th in 2004 from Miryalaguda constituency and the 15th in 2009 from Chevella. He was also a member of the Rajya Sabha on two occasions, 1990–1996 and 1997–1998.

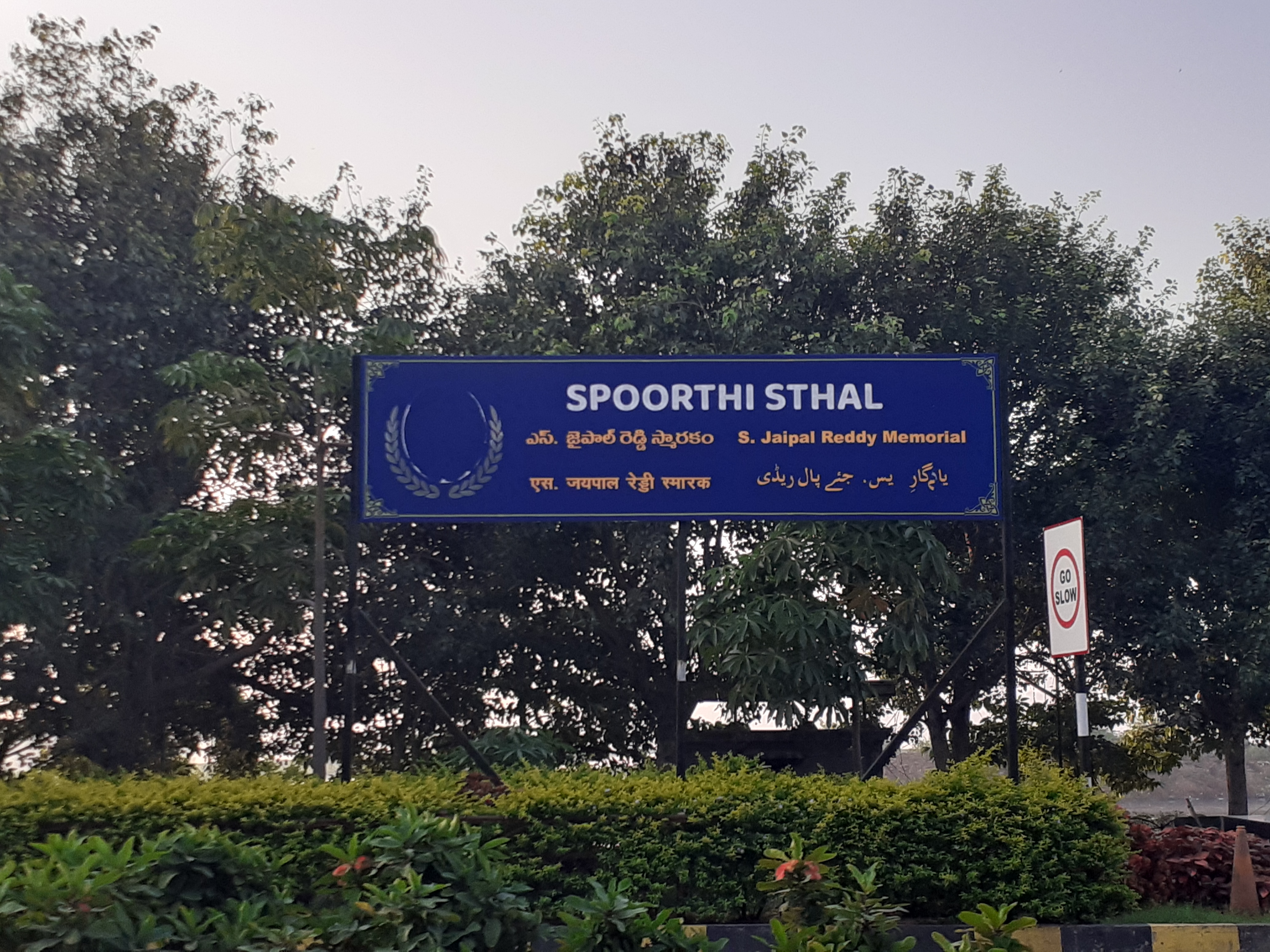
Spoorthi Sthal a memorial to honour S Jaipal Reddy at Hyderabad

He also held the position of leader of opposition in the Rajya Sabha for a year from June 1991 to June 1992. He served as the minister for Information and Broadcasting in the government on two occasions: in 1997–1998 under I. K. Gujral and from 2004 under Manmohan Singh with additional responsibility for Culture. He also served as the minister for Urban Development and Petroleum and Natural Gas.

He acted as the spokesman for several parties of which he has been a member and was awarded the Outstanding Parliamentarian Award in 1998. He was the first from South India and the youngest parliamentarian to achieve this award.

=== Removal from the oil ministry ===
The last cabinet reshuffle of the UPA-II government took place on 28 October 2012. Reddy was shifted from his current ministry to the Science and Technology ministry after he differed on the gas allocation to Reliance and his refusal to accept demands of Reliance. The oil ministry had imposed a fine of 7000 Rs. crores on Mukesh Ambani's company for the sharp drop in production of gas and violations mentioned in CAG's 2011 report. Further, the oil ministry did not approve company's US$7.2 billion stake in deal with BP. Opposition parties including the BJP, SP, and AAP said that he was removed owing to alleged pressure from the corporate houses, particularly from the Reliance group of Industries. However he refuted the claims and said that he needed to understand the new portfolio.

== Election History ==
=== Lok Sabha ===
Year	Constituency	Party	Votes	%	Opponent	Party	Votes	%	Result	Margin	%
1980	Medak	JP	82,453	18.57	Indira Gandhi	INC(I)	301,577	67.93	Lost	−219,124	−49.36
1984	Mahabubnagar	JP	274,064	51.89	Mallikarjun	INC	193,961	36.72	Won	+80,103	+15.17
1989	Mahabubnagar	JD	265,984	41.19	Mallikarjun	INC	335,762	51.99	Lost	−69,778	−10.80
1998	Mahabubnagar	JD	278,302	37.25	Dr. Mallikarjun	INC	255,661	34.22	Won	+22,641	+3.03
1999	Miryalguda	INC	401,437	44.12	Rangashai Reddy Yadevelli	TDP	349,360	38.40	Won	+52,077	+5.72
2004	Miryalguda	INC	572,169	59.44	Vangala Swamy Goud	TDP	355,262	36.91	Won	+216,907	+22.53
2009	Chelvella	INC	420,807	38.78	A.P. Jithender Reddy	TDP	402,275	37.08	Won	+18,532	+1.70
2014	Mahbubnagar	INC	331,638	32.66	AP Jithender Reddy	TRS	334,228	32.91	Lost	−2,590	−0.25

=== Rajya Sabha ===
Position	Party	Constituency	From	To	Tenure
Member of Parliament, Rajya Sabha (1st Term)	JD	Andhra Pradesh	10 April 1990	9 April 1996	5 years, 365 days
Member of Parliament, Rajya Sabha (2nd Term)	JD	Andhra Pradesh	29 September 1997	2 March 1998	154 days

== Death ==
Reddy died on 28 July 2019 at AIG Hospital, Gachibowli in Hyderabad of pneumonia.

Lok Sabha
Preceded by Mallikarjun Goud	Member of Parliament for Mahabubnagar; 1984 – 1989	Succeeded by Mallikarjun Goud
Preceded by Mallikarjun Goud	Member of Parliament for Mahabubnagar; 1998 – 1999	Succeeded by A. P. Jithender Reddy
Preceded by Baddam Narsimha Reddy	Member of Parliament for Miryalguda; 1999 – 2009	Succeeded by Constituency Demolished
Preceded by Constituency Created	Member of Parliament for Chevella; 2009 – 2014	Succeeded by Konda Vishweshwar Reddy
Political offices
Preceded by M. S. Gurupadaswamy	Leader of the Opposition in the Rajya Sabha; 22 July 1991 – 29 June 1992	Succeeded by Sikander Bakht
Preceded by P. A. Sangma	Minister of Information and Broadcasting; 1996 – 1998	Succeeded by Arun Jaitley
Preceded by Ravi Shankar Prasad	Minister of Information and Broadcasting; 23 May 2004 – 18 November 2005	Succeeded by Priya Ranjan Dasmunsi
Preceded by Jagmohan; Known as Ministry of Tourism and Culture	Minister of Culture; 23 May 2004 – 30 January 2006	Succeeded by Ambika Soni
Preceded by Ghulam Nabi Azad	Minister of Urban Development; 18 November 2005 – 18 January 2011	Succeeded by Kamal Nath
Preceded by Murli Deora	Minister of Petroleum and Natural Gas; 19 January 2011 – 28 October 2012	Succeeded by Veerappa Moily
Preceded by Vayalar Ravi	Minister of Science and Technology; 28 October 2012 – 26 May 2014	Succeeded by Jitendra Singh
Preceded by Vayalar Ravi	Minister of Earth Sciences; 28 October 2012 – 26 May 2014	Succeeded by Jitendra Singh
