= G. S. Reddi =

Indian politician

Gopu show (G.S.) Reddy

Member of Parliament, Lok Sabha
- In office 1977–1984
- Preceded by: Bheemireddy Narsimha Reddy
- Succeeded by: Bheemireddy Narsimha Reddy
- In office 1967–1971
- Preceded by: Laxmi Dass
- Succeeded by: Bheemireddy Narsimha Reddy
- Constituency: Miryalguda

Personal details
- Born: 5 May 1917 Matampalli, Nalgonda district, Telangana, India
- Died: 1986, age 69 Miryalguda
- Party: Indian National Congress
- Spouse: G. Therojamma
- Children: 6 Reddy

G. S. Reddy was an Indian politician. He was a member of parliament, representing Miryalguda in the Lok Sabha, the lower house of India's Parliament, as a member of the Indian National Congress.
