= Dhinakaran =

Dhinakaran or Dinakaran is a given name or surname, which may refer to:

- D. G. S. Dhinakaran, Indian evangelical preacher
- T. T. V. Dhinakaran, Indian politician
- Dinakaran, Tamil newspaper
- Dinakaran attack, the attack on the newspaper
- Vaishali Dinakaran (born 1987) an Indian writer
- P. D. Dinakaran (born 1950) Indian Chief Justice of the Sikkim High Court
- Thinakaran, daily Tamil newspaper in Sri Lanka
