= Mahabubnagar Lok Sabha constituency =

Lok Sabha Constituency in Telangana

Coordinates: 16.7°N 78.0°E

Mahabubnagar TG-11
- Lok Sabha constituency
- Mahabubnagar Lok Sabha constituency in Telangana

Constituency details
- Country: India
- Region: South India
- State: Telangana
- Assembly constituencies: Kodangal; Narayanpet; Mahabubnagar; Jadcherla; Devarkadra; Makthal; Shadnagar
- Established: 1952
- Total electors: 1,418,672
- Reservation: None

Member of Parliament
- 18th Lok Sabha
- Incumbent D. K. Aruna
- Party: BJP
- Elected year: 2024

Mahabubnagar Lok Sabha constituency is one of the 17 Lok Sabha (Lower House of the Parliament) constituencies in Telangana state in southern India.

DK Aruna of the BJP was elected as Mahabubnagar's MP in the 2024 India general election.

== Overview ==
Since its inception in 1957 Mahabubnagar seat is a Congress stronghold, various political outfits like the Telangana Praja Samithi, Bharatiya Janata Party and the Janata Party have won it during different general elections.

During the final stages of Telangana Agitation it was represented by Kalvakuntla Chandrashekar Rao, the founder of Bharat Rashtra Samithi.

== Assembly segments ==
Mahbubnagar Lok Sabha constituency comprises the following Legislative Assembly segments:

No	Name	District	Member	Party	Leading (in 2024)
72	Kodangal	Narayanpet	Anumula Revanth Reddy	INC	INC
73	Narayanpet	Narayanpet	Chittem Parnika Reddy	INC	BJP
74	Mahbubnagar	Mahabubnagar	Yennam Srinivas Reddy	INC	BJP
75	Jadcherla	Mahabubnagar	Janampalli Anirudh Reddy	INC	INC
76	Devarkadra	Mahabubnagar	Gavinolla Madhusudan Reddy	INC	BJP
77	Makthal	Narayanpet	Vakiti Srihari	INC	BJP
84	Shadnagar	Ranga Reddy	K Shankaraiah	INC	INC

== Members of Parliament ==
Year	Member	Party
1952	K. Janaradhan Reddy	Indian National Congress
1957	J. Rameshwar Rao	Indian National Congress
1962	J. B. Muthyal Rao	Indian National Congress
1967	J. Rameshwar Rao	Indian National Congress
1971	J. Rameshwar Rao	Telangana Praja Samithi
1977	J. Rameshwar Rao	Indian National Congress
1980	Mallikarjun Goud	Indian National Congress
1984	S. Jaipal Reddy	Janata Party
1989	Mallikarjun Goud	Indian National Congress
1991	Mallikarjun Goud	Indian National Congress
1996	Mallikarjun Goud	Indian National Congress
1998	S. Jaipal Reddy	Janata Dal
1999	A. P. Jithender Reddy	Bharatiya Janata Party
2004	D. Vittal Rao	Indian National Congress
2009	K. Chandrashekar Rao	Telangana Rashtra Samithi
2014	A. P. Jithender Reddy	Telangana Rashtra Samithi
2019	Manne Srinivas Reddy	Telangana Rashtra Samithi
2024	D. K. Aruna	Bharatiya Janata Party

== Election results ==
=== General election, 2024 ===
2024 Indian general election: Mahabubnagar
Party	Candidate	Votes	%	±%
BJP	D. K. Aruna	510,747	41.66	▲9.78
INC	Challa Vamshi Chand Reddy	506,247	41.29	▲21.62
BRS	Manne Srinivas Reddy	154,792	12.62	▼29.16
NOTA	None of the above	7,755	0.63	▼0.45
Majority		4,500	0.37	▼7.53
Turnout		1,226,078	71.85	▲6.46
BJP gain from BRS		Swing		

=== General election, 2019 ===
2019 Indian general elections: Mahabubnagar
Party	Candidate	Votes	%	±%
BRS	Manne Srinivas Reddy	411,402	41.78	
BJP	D. K. Aruna	3,33,573	33.88	
INC	Challa Vamshi Chand Reddy	1,93,631	19.67	
NOTA	None of the above	10,600	1.08	
IND.	Imtiyaz Ahamad	8,495	0.86	
Majority		77,829	7.90	
Turnout		9,84,767	65.39	
TRS hold		Swing		

=== General election, 2014 ===
2014 Indian general elections: Mahabubnagar
Party	Candidate	Votes	%	±%
BRS	A. P. Jithender Reddy	334,228	32.94	
INC	Jaipal Reddy	3,31,638	32.68	
BJP	Nagam Janardhan Reddy	2,72,791	26.88	
NOTA	None of the above	9,037	0.89	
Majority		2,590	0.26	
Turnout		10,14,800	72.94	+5.26
BRS hold		Swing		

=== General election, 2009 ===
2009 Indian general elections: Mahabubnagar
Party	Candidate	Votes	%	±%
BRS	K. Chandrashekar Rao	366,569	39.56	
INC	Devarakonda Vittal Rao	3,46,385	37.39	
BJP	K. Yadagiri Reddy	57,955	6.26	
Majority		20,184	2.17	
Turnout		9,26,516	67.68	
BRS gain from INC		Swing		

=== General election, 2004 ===
2004 Indian general elections: Mahabubnagar
Party	Candidate	Votes	%	±%
INC	D. Vittal Rao	428,764	49.48	+6.45
TDP	Yelkoti Yella Reddy	380,857	43.95	
Majority		47,907	5.53	+11.96
Turnout		866,550	63.46	−3.03
INC gain from BJP		Swing	+6.45	

== Trivia ==
- J. Rameshwar Rao, member of Wanaparthy Samsthanam represented the constituency in 2nd,4th,5th and 6th Lok Sabha respectively.
- Jaipal Reddy, former Union Minister represented the constituency in 8th Lok Sabha and 12th Lok Sabha respectively.
- K. Chandrasekhar Rao, Former Chief Minister of Telangana represented the constituency in 15th Lok Sabha.

== See also ==
- Mahbubnagar district
- List of constituencies of the Lok Sabha
