= A. Rami Reddi =

Indian politician

A. Rami Reddi was an Indian politician. He was elected to the Madras Legislative Assembly in the 1952 election, standing as the Indian National Congress candidate in the Duggirala constituency. A. Rami Reddi obtained 19,002 votes (41.63% of the votes in the constituency). He died before the end of his tenure, and a by-election to fill his seat (now part of the new state of Andhra Pradesh) was held in June 1954.
