= Miryalguda Lok Sabha constituency =

Former constituency of the Indian parliament in Andhra Pradesh

Coordinates: 16.9°N 79.6°E

Miryalguda
- Former Lok Sabha constituency

Constituency details
- Country: India
- Region: South India
- State: Andhra Pradesh
- Assembly constituencies: Thungathurthi; Suryapet; Kodad; Miryalaguda; Chalakurthi; Nakrekal; Ramannapet
- Established: 1962
- Abolished: 2008
- Reservation: None

Miryalguda was a Lok Sabha constituency of Andhra Pradesh till 2008.

== Members of Parliament ==
Year	Winner	Party
1962	Laxmi Dass	Communist Party of India
1967	G. S.Reddy	Indian National Congress
1971	Bheemireddy Narsimha Reddy	Communist Party of India (Marxist)
1977	G. S. Reddi	Indian National Congress
1980	G. S. Reddi	Indian National Congress
1984	Bheemireddy Narsimha Reddy	Communist Party of India (Marxist)
1989	Baddam Narsimha Reddy	Indian National Congress
1991	Bheemireddy Narsimha Reddy	Communist Party of India (Marxist)
1996	Baddam Narsimha Reddy	Indian National Congress
1998	Baddam Narsimha Reddy	Indian National Congress
1999	Jaipal Reddy	Indian National Congress
2004	Jaipal Reddy	Indian National Congress
Constituency Demolished in 2008 after Delimitation Commission of India Report.

== Election results ==
=== 2004 ===
2004 Indian general elections: Miryalguda
Party	Candidate	Votes	%	±%
INC	Jaipal Reddy	572,169	59.44	+15.32
TDP	Swamy Vangala Goud	355,262	36.91	−1.49
Independent	Marry Nehemiah	9,566	0.99	+0.75
Independent	Sarasani Damodar Reddy	9,456	0.98	
Independent	Yanala Narasi Reddy	8,166	0.85	
MCPI(S)	Venkanna Varikuppala	7,980	0.83	−0.72
Majority		216,907	22.53	+8.81
Turnout		962,599	74.75	−2.5
INC hold		Swing	+15.32	

== See also ==
- Miryalguda
- List of constituencies of the Lok Sabha
