= Ummareddy Venkateswarlu =

Indian politician (born 1935)

Chief Whip of Andhra Pradesh Legislative Council
- In office 18 June 2019 – 4 June 2024
- Chief Minister: Y. S. Jagan Mohan Reddy

Leader of Opposition of Andhra Pradesh Legislative Council
- In office 20 April 2017 – 8 June 2019
- Chairman: A. Chakrapani; N. M. D. Farooq
- Leader of the House: N. Chandrababu Naidu
- Preceded by: position reestablished
- Succeeded by: Yanamala Ramakrishnudu

Andhra Pradesh Legislative Council
- Incumbent
- Assumed office 2011
- Chairman: A. Chakrapani; N. M. D. Farooq; Shariff Mohammed Ahmed; Koyye Moshenu Raju
- Leader of the House: Kiran Kumar Reddy; N. Chandrababu Naidu; Y. S. Jagan Mohan Reddy
- Constituency: elected from local authorities

Minister of State for Urban Affairs and Employment
- In office 9 June 1997 – 19 March 1998
- Prime Minister: I. K. Gujral
- Preceded by: I. K. Gujral
- Succeeded by: Ram Jethmalani

Minister of State for Urban Affairs and Employment
- In office 29 June 1996 – 9 June 1997 Serving with M. P. Veerendra Kumar (1997)
- Prime Minister: H. D. Deve Gowda; I. K. Gujral
- Preceded by: S. S. Ahluwalia
- Succeeded by: M. P. Veerendra Kumar

Minister of State for Agriculture
- In office 1 June 1996 – 29 June 1996 Serving with Samudrala Venugopal Chary
- Prime Minister: H. D. Deve Gowda
- Preceded by: Mohd. Ayub Khan
- Succeeded by: Samudrala Venugopal Chary

Member of Parliament, Lok Sabha
- In office 1999–2004
- Preceded by: P. Shivashankar
- Succeeded by: Balashowry Vallabhaneni
- Constituency: Tenali
- In office 1996–1998
- Preceded by: Daggubati Venkateswara Rao
- Succeeded by: N. Janardhana Reddy
- Constituency: Bapatla
- In office 1991–1996
- Preceded by: Basavapunnaiah Singam
- Succeeded by: Sarada Tadiparthi
- Constituency: Tenali

Member of Andhra Pradesh Legislative Assembly
- In office 1985–1989
- Preceded by: C. V. Ramaraju
- Succeeded by: Chirala Govardhan Reddy
- Constituency: Bapatla

Personal details
- Born: 1 July 1935 (age 91) Kondubhotla Palem Village, Bapatla, Guntur district, Madras Presidency, India (now Bapatla district, Andhra Pradesh, India)
- Party: YSR Congress Party (since 2012)
- Other political affiliations: Telugu Desam Party (1983–2012)
- Spouse: Smt. Sarojini Devi
- Children: 4

Ummareddy Venkateswarlu (born 1 July 1935) is an Indian politician who has served as Chief Whip in Andhra Pradesh Legislative Council since June 2019. He joined YSR Congress party in November 2012. He was an MLA and senior leader in Telugu Desam Party.

== Life ==
He is a native of Kondubhotla Palem of Bapatla Mandal in Guntur district of Andhra Pradesh. He belongs to Kapu (caste) which falls under OC category . He holds a doctorate in agriculture and was educated at Andhra Pradesh Agriculture University and Banaras Hindu University.

He along with his family owns DPS ( Delhi Public School ) , Hyderabad branches in khajaguda ( gachibowli) , Secunderabad (Diamond Point) and Miyapur (Bowrampet) .

== Electoral History ==
=== Lok Sabha ===
Year	Constituency	Party	Votes	%	Opponent	Party	Votes	%	Result	Margin	%
1989	Tenali	TDP	2,80,962	44.44	Basavapannayya Singam	INC	3,45,150	54.60	Lost	-64,188	-10.16
1991	Tenali	TDP	2,52,900	47.74	Basavapunnaiah Singam	INC	2,42,729	45.82	Won	+10,171	+1.92
1996	Bapatla	TDP	2,76,064	41.51	Vijaya Prad Arya	INC	2,67,802	40.27	Won	+8,262	+1.24
1998	Bapatla	TDP	2,76,300	41.27	N. Janardhana Reddy	INC	3,16,788	47.31	Lost	-40,488	-6.04
1999	Tenali	TDP	3,39,800	52.63	P. Shiv Shanker	INC	2,66,771	41.32	Won	+73,029	+11.31
2004	Tenali	TDP	2,88,287	42.81	Balashowry Vallabhaneni	INC	3,66,843	54.47	Lost	-78,556	-11.66

== Positions ==
- 1985–89 Member, Andhra Pradesh Legislative Assembly
- 1986 Member, Select Committee to Amend the Andhra Pradesh Co-operatives Act
- 1987–89 Member, Estimates Committee Andhra Pradesh Legislative Assembly
- 1989–91 Secretary, Telugu Desam Party (T.D.P.), Andhra Pradesh
- 1991 Elected to 10th Lok Sabha (Tenali seat)
- 1991–94 Member, Consultative Committee, Ministry of Agriculture
- 1991–95 Vice-President, T.D.P., Andhra Pradesh
- 1993–94 Member, Committee on Papers Laid on the Table
- 1993–96 Member, Committee on Human Resource Development
- 1994–96 Member, Consultative Committee, Ministry of Communications
- 1995–96 Member, Committee on Government Assurances
- 1996 Re-elected to 11th Lok Sabha (2nd term) (Bapatla seat)
- Member, Politburo, T.D.P.
- President, T.D.P. (Publicity wing)
- 1996–98 Union Minister of State, Agriculture
- Union Minister of State, Urban Affairs, Employment and Parliamentary Affairs (Independent Charge)
- 1999 Re-elected to 13th Lok Sabha (3rd term) (Tenali seat)
- 1999–2000 Member, Committee on Energy
- Member, Joint Committee on the Protection of Plant Varieties and Farmers'
- Rights Bill, 1999
- Member, General Purposes Committee
- 1999–2000 Chairman, Committee on Estimates 2000-2001
- 2015 Member of Legislative Council, Andhra Pradesh
- 2019 Opposition Floor Leader, Andhra Pradesh Legislative Council
- 2021 Member of Legislative Council, Andhra Pradesh
- 2022 Chief Whip for Andhra Pradesh Legislative Council.
