= Tenali Lok Sabha constituency =

Former constituency of Andhra Pradesh, India

Coordinates: 16.2°N 80.6°E

Tenali
- Former Lok Sabha constituency

Constituency details
- Country: India
- Region: South India
- State: Andhra Pradesh
- Assembly constituencies: Nidumolu; Avanigadda; Repalle; Vemuru; Duggirala; Tenali; Mangalagiri
- Established: 1952
- Abolished: 2008

Tenali was Lok Sabha constituency of Andhra Pradesh till 2008.

== Members of Parliament ==
Year	Winner	Party
1952	Kotha Raghuramaiah	Indian National Congress
1957	N. G. Ranga	Indian National Congress
1962	Kolla Venkaiah	Communist Party of India
1971	Lavu Balagangadhara Rao	Communist Party of India
1977	Nageswararao Meduri	Indian National Congress
1980	M. Nageswara Rao	Indian National Congress
1984	Venkataratnam Nissankararao	Telugu Desam Party
1989	Basavapunnaiah Singam	Indian National Congress
1991	Ummareddy Venkateswarlu	Telugu Desam Party
1996	Sarada Tadiparthi	Telugu Desam Party
1998	P. Shiv Shankar	Indian National Congress
1999	Ummareddy Venkateswarlu	Telugu Desam Party
2004	Balashowry Vallabhaneni	Indian National Congress
Constituency abolished in 2008 after the Delimitation Commission of India Report. See: Guntur Lok Sabha constituency

== Election results ==
=== 2004 ===
2004 Indian general elections: Tenali
Party	Candidate	Votes	%	±%
INC	Balashowry Vallabhaneni	366,843	54.47	+13.15
TDP	Ummareddy Venkateswarlu	288,287	42.81	−9.82
BSP	Dilip Raaja Donepudi	5,694	0.85	
Independent	Venkateswarlu Palla	5,679	0.84	
TRS	Narasimha Reddy Tera	4,183	0.62	
Independent	Duggirala Raja Ramkumar	1,623	0.24	
Independent	Mandali Subrahmanyam	1,153	0.17	
Majority		78,556	11.66	+22.97
Turnout		673,462	76.55	+7.90
INC hold		Swing	+13.15	

== See also ==
- Tenali
- List of constituencies of the Lok Sabha
