= Valamram =

Indian saint (1824–1886)

Valamram (1824–1886) was a prominent Hindu saint and social reformer of the 19th century. He was a disciple of Bhoja Bhagat. He lived in Gariadhar. He was Guru-Bhai of Jalaram of Virpur.

== Early life ==
Valam was born in 1824 a member of the Kunbi caste to Lavaji Narayan Katrodia and Jabai. As a young man he met Bhoja Bhagat of Fatehpur, who had earlier appeared in his dreams. Bhoja Bhagat made him his disciple and gave him the kanthi and name of Valamram.

== Career ==
He started Sadavrat, a free feeding center at Gariadhar in 1870. He took live samadhi in 1886. As per promise by Valamram, the Dhwaja is hoisted atop Bhoja Bhagat's ashram at Fatehpur, on the latter's birthday. The Dhwaja is sent from Gariadhar by Valamram's Ashram The Ashram and feeding center started by him in Gariadhar, is still operating.

In January, 2012, more than 150 year-old four metal idols of Sri Krishna of religious significance, were stolen from the Ashram. A folk-tale relates that two of the idols were presented to Valamramji by Lord Krishna, when he gave darshan to him. These idols were installed in temple inside the ashram by Valamramji himself. The other two idols were installed by Mahantas, who succeeded the ashram's gadi, after Valamram's demise. One day after the theft the idols were found lying inside a bag, left at the ashram's gate. Two metal idols were found broken and two intact. A procession was held to celebrate their return.
