= Udhas =

Udhas is a surname. Notable people with the surname include:

- Manhar Udhas (born 1943), Indian singer
- Nirmal Udhas (born 1944), Indian singer
- Pankaj Udhas (1951–2024), Indian singer
