= Samadhiala Charan =

Erstwhile non-salutory Charan princely state in Gujarat

Samadhiala Charan is a village and former non-salutory princely state on Saurashtra peninsula in Gujarat, India. At present, the village lies in Jetpur taluka of Rajkot district.

== See also ==
- Derdi-Janbai
