= Panchpipla =

- Village
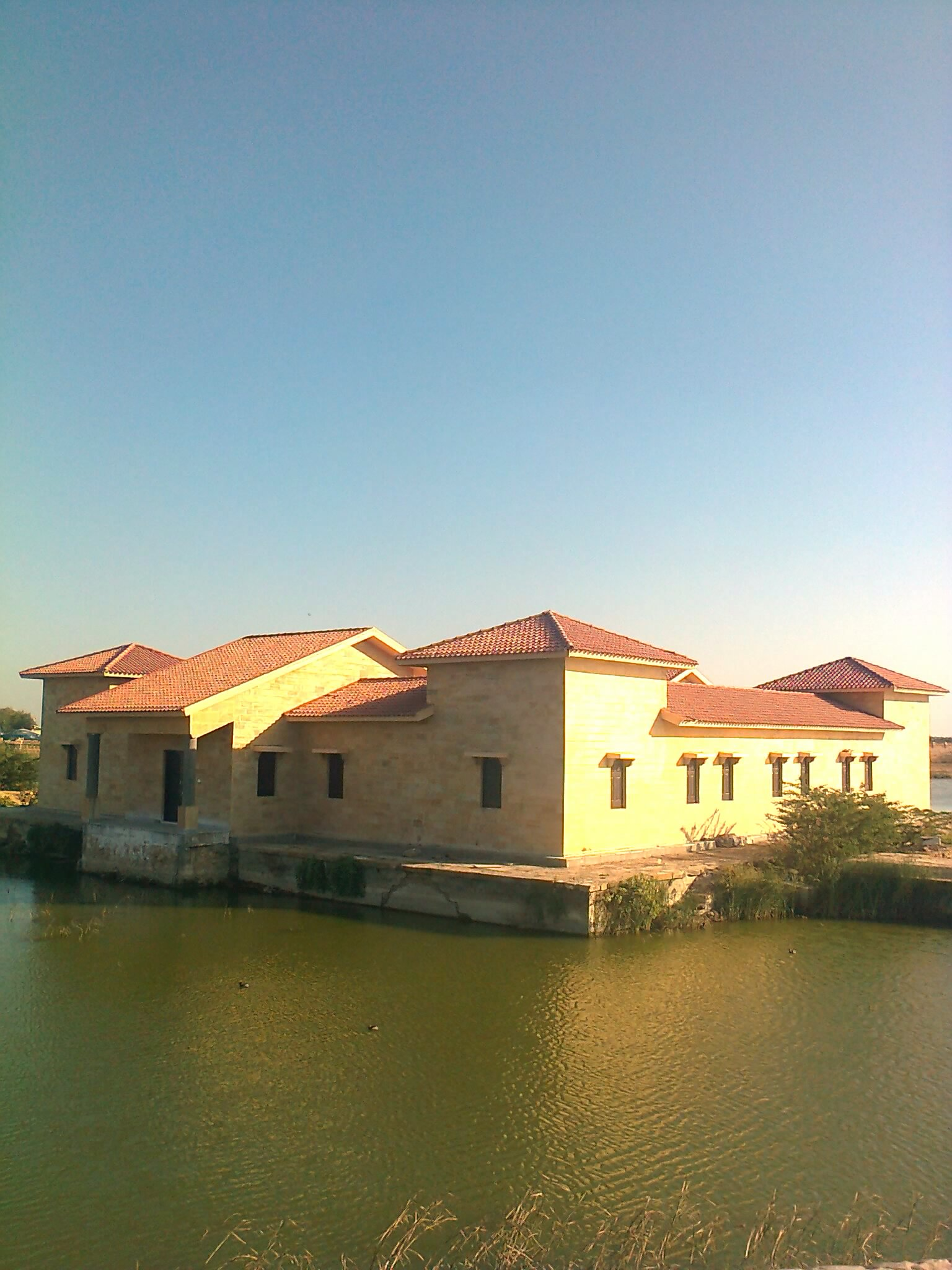
- Country: India
- State: Gujarat
- District: Rajkot
- Tehsil: Jetpur
- Elevation: 90 m (300 ft)
- Time zone: IST
- PIN code: 360370
- Area code: 02823

best trast sargam govshala seva samiti

Panchpipla is a village in Rajkot district in the state of Gujarat, India. Villagers speak Gujarati, Hindi, and English. Panchpipla is the largest village among approximately 44 other villages of Jetpur tehsil. The population of the village is around 9500 to 12000. The village is located 69 km (43 mi) south of district headquarters Rajkot.

== Transportation ==
Upleta, Junagadh, Kalavad, Manavadar are the nearby cities to Panchpipla.

Gujarati is the local language spoken in the village.

Navagadh Rail Way Station, Jetalsar Jn Rail Way Station are the very nearby railway stations to Panchpipla. However, Rajkot Jn Rail Way Station is major railway station 68 km near to Panchpipla.

Capital Rajkot to 60 km towards Jetpur, and Jetpur 9 km towards Panchpipla. (Between village from Jetpur to Panchpipla is Pedhala by two way road. Or Sardharpur by one way road).

== Education ==
- G.K & C.K. Bosamiya commerce college - Jetpur 360370
- Sree Raniben Commerce college - Jetpur 360370
- Panchpipla Primary School(Government) - Panchpipla
- Panchpipla Secondary School (Government) - Panchpipla
- Sunflower English school (Private) - Panchpipla
