= Bhoja Bhagat =

Gujarati Poet

Personal life
- Born: 1785 or Fattehpur, Gujarat, India
- Died: 1850 (aged 64–65); Virpur, Gujarat
- Parent(s): Karshan Savaliya, Gangabai Savaliya
- Occupation: farmer, saint, poet

Religious life
- Religion: Hinduism

Bhoja Bhagat (1785–1850), also known as Bhojal or Bhojalram, was a Hindu saint poet from Gujarat, India.

== Life ==
Bhoja or Bhojo was born in 1785 in Leuva Patidar caste at village named Devkigalol near Jetpur in Saurashtra. His father's name was Karshandas and mother was Gangabai and family surname was Savaliya. He met his guru, a sanyasi from Girnar at age of 12. Later, when he was 24, the family shifted to Fatehpur near Amreli, Gujarat. He came to be known as Bhoja Bhagat (Bhagat derived from Bhakt, devotee) and Bhojalram in his later life.

By occupation he was a farmer. Although, he was an illiterate, but with blessings of his Guru in Girnar, he wrote poems and songs condemning social inequities, which became well known as Bhoja Bhagat Na Chabkha.

Bhoja Bhagat died in 1850 at age of 65 at Virpur, where he had gone to visit his disciple Jalaram. His memorial temple (called Ota locally) is located at Virpur.

== Works ==
He liked to call himself as Bhojal in his verses. As a poet and philosopher he also wrote Aartis, Bhajans, Dholas, Kafis, Kirtans, Mahinas and Prabhatias but is most famous for his Chabkhas. These satirical pieces are known as Bhoja Bhagat na Chabkha ( literally Lashes of Bhoja Bhagat ) in Gujarati. His rough language is seen in these Chabkha which tells about social equanimity. His tender and compassionate language is visible in his verses, pada describing separation of Gopis from Krishna in Bhaktamala, Chalaiyakhyan and his bhajan of Kachabo ane Kachabi (couple of turtles). His Saravadan is about union with cosmic consciousness.

== Legacy ==
His followers visit Fatehpur today to pay their respects, where he spent major part of his life. The ashram of Bhoja Bhagat houses his paghdi, rosary beads and padukas. The original brick-house of Bhoja Bhagat stands as it is and his personal belongings are kept here and there is an ashram headed by mahant, called gadi-pati (head of seat).

He had many disciples of whom the two most illustrious and known are saints Jalaram of Virpur and Valamram of Gariadhar.

== See also ==
- List of Gujarati-language writers
