= Devla, India =

Devla also known as Devda is a village in the Rajkot District, Gujarat, India.
