= Dolatpar =

Dolatpar is a village in Rajkot district, Gujarat, India.
