= Rampara, Rajkot district =

Rampara
- Village
- Country: India
- State: Gujarat
- District: Rajkot District

Population (2011)
  - Total: 170

Languages
  - Official: Gujarati (State), Hindi (Federal)
- Time zone: UTC+5:30 (IST)
- Vehicle registration: GJ
- Climate: Dry almost (Köppen)
- Website: gujaratindia.com

Rampara is a village in Rajkot district in the Indian state of Gujarat.

== Demographics ==
As of 2011 the population of Rampara is about 170 out of which 88 are males and 82 females. Sex ratio of the village is 932 which is higher than the state average. Children below 6 years of age constitute 18.82% and have a sex ratio of 882. The literacy rate of the village is 64.09% (Males - 78.87% and Female - 49.25%). About 28.04% of the people belong to Schedule Caste.

== Economy ==
Agriculture is the main source of livelihood for the people.
