= Lapasari =

- Village
- Country: India
- State: Gujarat
- District: Rajkot

Languages
  - Official: Gujarati, Hindi
- Time zone: UTC+5:30 (IST)
- PIN: 360002
- Vehicle registration: GJ-3
- Nearest city: Rajkot
- Website: gujaratindia.com

Lapasari Village is near Rajkot city in Rajkot district in Gujarat State in India.

== Lapasari (Rotary Mid Town Check Dam) ==
This is a small check dam constructed on river Bhakharwadi near village Lapasari 8 km away from Rajkot city. About 50 McFt water from this Check Dam will be diverted to Aji river in every monsoon. This dam is constructed with a financial-aid from "Rotary International Club".
