= Ansodar =

Ansodar is a village in Lathi Taluka of Amreli district, Gujarat, India.

== History ==
Loma Khuman of Kherdi State resided here for some time when Noghanji Gohil was ruling at Gariadhar. Khimo Chandsir, also a Kathi, was at this time Noghanji's minister. As he was a distant connection of Loma Khuman's that chieftain invited him one day to Ansodar. While there he said to him that as vegetables abounded at Gariadhar, Noghanji should send him some. Khimo replied proudly that Noghanji was not a greengrocer that he should supply Loma with vegetables, Loma angrily rejoined that he would send his horsemen both to take the vegetable and also lift the cattle. To this Khimo answered that when Lotna's horsemen should come he would endeavour to give them a fitting reception. Some days afterwards, Loma sent two hundred chosen horse, who both ravaged the gardens of Gariadhar and drove off the cattle.

Noghanji Gohil fled to Dhunoji at Sihor, and Loma Khuman occupied the town of Gariadhar, and placed his son Kanthad Khuman there at the head of a strong force. In the meantime he prepared to attack Dhunoji. The armies gave battle near the village of Valavad, and Dhunoji, after fighting bravely, was slain. Loma Khuman now himself returned to Kherdi, where his uncle Nagpal Khuman was ruling. During his absence Noghanji, with the aid of the Baria Kolis and that of Akherajji of Sihor, obtained an entrance by treachery in the town of Gariadhar, and recovered it. putting Kanthad Khuman, son of Loma, to death. Loma made many forays against Gariadhar aud did it much injury, but never succeeded in retaking it. Finally, Noghanji Gohil made peace with Loma through the intervention of Charan Mokabhai, and they drank opium together in token of amity. On this occasion Noghanji bestowed Ranigam on Loma Khuman in compensation for the death of his son Kanthad, and the Khumans held Ranigam during the British period.

Loma Khuman had a feud with Navanagar State, which is said to have first arisen when he accompanied Amin Khan Ghori and Kunvar Ajoji in pursuit of Mirza Khan to Kodinar. On this occasion he took an elephant and refused to surrender it to Jasa Ladhak, minister of Jam Sataji. Afterwards, when he had accompanied Sultan Muzafar to Ahmadabad, Jasa Ladhak laid Kherdi waste, and carried off the elephant. Loma Khuman concealed his anger, but afterwards by deserting the Jam on the field of Bhuchar Mori, caused him to be defeated, and Jasa Ladhak and Kunvar Ajoji to lose their lives. After this the enmity between Loma Khuman and Navanagar was very bitter, and Loma Khuman led forays up to the very gates of Navanagar. On one occasion he was met by Jam Jasaji and his nephew Lakhoji and a cadet named Sartanji at the head of their army, on the banks of the Rangmati river close to Navanagar. The Jam called on Loma to flee, but Loma refused, and immediately gave the order to charge. The Jam was worsted and forced to retire into the town, but Sartanji was slain and Lakhoji's horse killed under him. The Jam being entirely unable to kill or capture Loma Khuman, at last treacherously invited him to Navanagar, and then seizing him, put him to death.

There is a piece of bardic poetry regarding this, as follows: (Note: The Gujarati poetry is as follows: Paschimma hundo Padashah Jam khuto jordvar, Lakhi patiyan mokale abhang Loma upar. Asar bole em tarat Nagar tedayo, Jam kacheri jeh abhang malava ayo. Dani patie didho dago janjir lai pagma jadyo, Samvat sol ekkdahie Paraj thambh Lomo padayo.)

The king of the west,
The powerful Jam, became a traitor;
He sent written letters
Addressed to the unconquered Loma
With such contents :
'Be pleased to come at once to Nagar,
Into the Jam's kacheri'
Came the unconquered Loma to visit him;
The lord of the earth was treacherous,
And clapped fetters on his legs.
In Samvat sixteen hundred and eighty-one [1681], (Note: This is Halari Samvat, and corresponds with 1620 AD.)

Loma, the pillar of the Paraj, (Note: Paraj is bardic for Kathis.) fell.

Ansodar afterwards belonged to the Kundla Khumans of Savarkundla, and was conquered by Vakhatsinghji of Bhavnagar State, together with the Kundla pargana. It was then conquered by Kumpa Vala of Chital, but ceded back again to Bhavnagar, together with Saldi, in about 1797.

== Notes and references ==
=== References ===
This article incorporates text from a publication now in the public domain: Gazetteer of the Bombay Presidency: Kathiawar. Vol. VIII. Printed at the Government Central Press, Bombay. 1884. pp. 368–369.
