= Jalaram Bapa =

Hindu saint and guru (1799–1881)

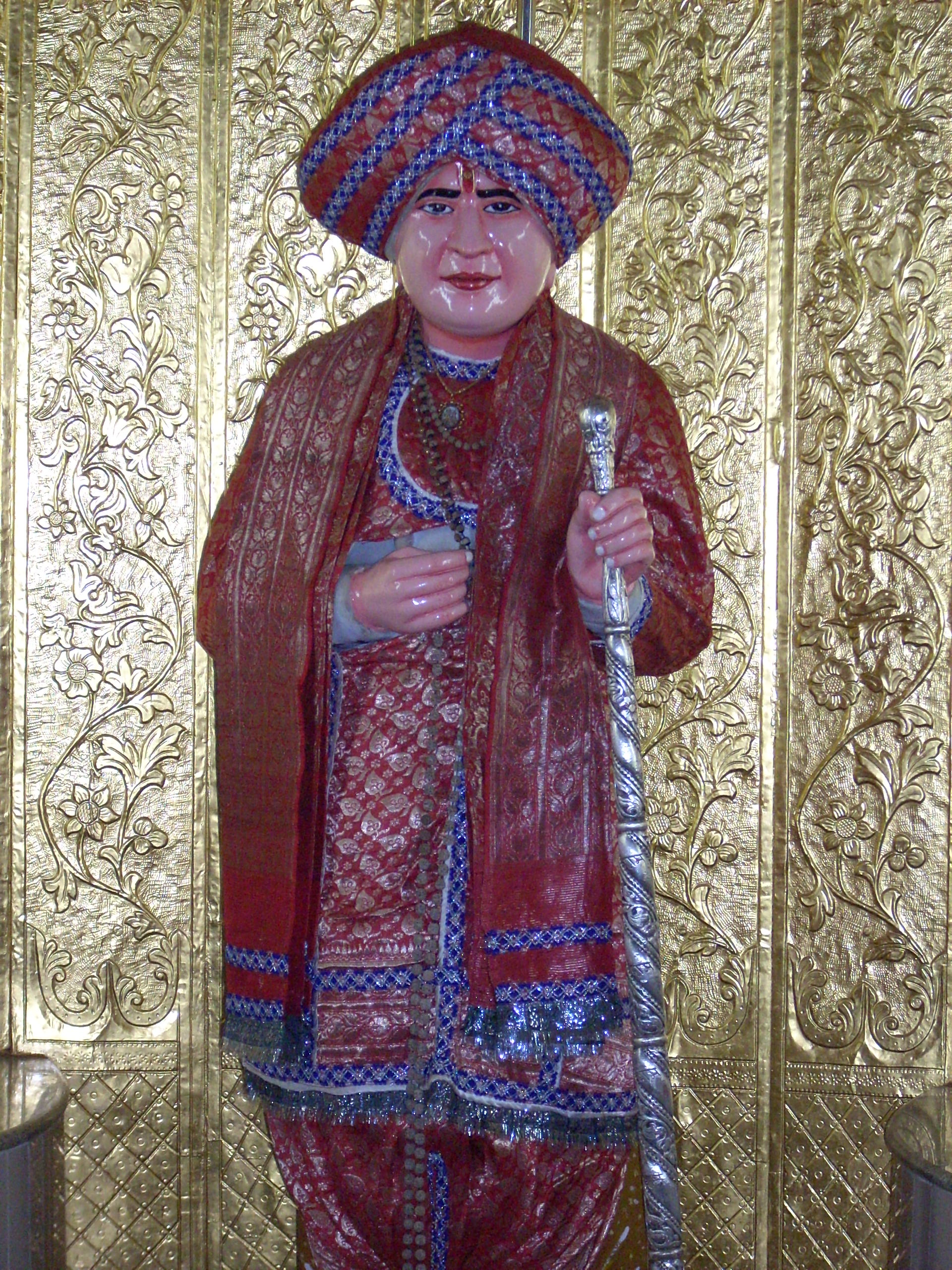
- Idol of Jalaram Bapa decorated on eve of Jalaram Jayanti
- Born: 4 November 1799; Virpur, Virpur-Kherdi State
- Died: 23 February 1881 (aged 81); Virpur, Virpur State, British India
- Spouse: Virbai Thakkar
- Children: 1

Jalaram Bapa (4 November 1799 (Samvat 1856) – 23 February 1881 (Samvat 1937), was a Hindu saint from Gujarat, India. He was born on 4 November 1799, one week after the Hindu festival of Diwali, which is associated with his Iṣṭa-devatā Lord Rama. He is mainly worshipped in Gujarat. Thursday is the day that is associated with him in Hinduism. Images of Jalaram Bapa usually portray him as wearing white, with a stick in his left hand and a tulsi mala in his right hand. He is always dressed in simple clothes which is a symbol of purity.

== Life ==
Jalaram Bapa was born in Virpur, Rajkot district, Gujarat, India in 1799, on the seventh day of the Kartika month. His father was Pradhan Thakkar and his mother was Rajbai Thakkar who belonged to Lohana clan. He was a devotee of Lord Rama.

Jalaram Bapa was however not willing to live a householder's life and continued to take care of his father's business. He was mostly engaged in serving pilgrims, sadhus and saints. He separated himself from his father's business and his uncle Valjibhai asked Jalaram Bapa and his wife Virbai to stay in his house.

At the age of sixteen, in 1816, Jalaram married Virbai, the daughter of Pragjibhai Thakkar (Somaiya) of Atkot. However, he was inclined to completely withdraw from materialistic life and become an ascetic. Virbai proved to be an asset to him in his works of feeding poor and needy.

At the age of 18, soon after returning from pilgrimage to Hindu holy places, Jalaram Bapa became the disciple of Bhoja Bhagat of Fatehpur, who accepted him as his disciple. Jalaram was given the Guru Mantra and japa mala in the name of Rama by his Guru Bhojalram. With blessings of his guru, he started "Sadavrat", a feeding centre, a place where all sadhus and saints as well as the needy could have food any time.

One day, a sadhu who came to his house gave him a deity of Lord Rama, forecasting that Hanuman, the monkey-god and devotee of Rama, would follow soon. Jalaram Bapa installed Rama as his family deity and after a few days, a deity of Hanuman appeared out of earth, on its own. The deity of Rama's consort Sita and his brother Lakshmana also appeared. Due to a miracle, the container in the house of Jalaram, where grains were stored, became inexhaustible. Later, other devotees and village folk joined him in his works of human welfare.

Jalaram bapa’s fame spread as a divine incarnation. Whoever came to Virpur, whether Hindu or Muslim irrespective of caste, creed and religion were fed by Jalaram. This tradition of feeding people continues to this day in Virpur.

It is believed that once a tailor named Haraji, who was suffering from severe stomach-ache came to him to get himself cured. Jalaram Bapa prayed to God and Haraji was cured. He fell at Jalaram Bapa's feet and addressed him as Bapa. Since then, he was known as Jalaram Bapa. Soon his fame spread and people came to him to get rid of diseases and problems. Jalaram Bapa would pray for them in the name of Rama and miracles happened. Both Hindus and Muslims became his disciples. In 1822, Jamal, son of a rich Muslim merchant fell ill and doctors gave up all hope. At that point of time, Haraji told Jamal of his experience (parcha). Jamal prayed from his house that if his son is cured of the disease, he would give 40 maunds of grain to Jalaram Bapa for sadavrat. His son recovered and Jamal visited house of Jalaram Bapa with cart load of grains and called him Jalla so Allah!.

It is said that at one time, God in the guise of an old saint told Jalaram to send Virbai to serve him. Jalaram consulted her and with her consent, sent her with the saint. But after walking some miles and reaching a nearby forest, the saint asked Virbai to wait for him. She waited but the saint did not return. Instead, she heard an Akashwani stating that it was only to test the hospitality of the couple. Before the saint disappeared, he left a Danda [staff] and Jholi [cloth bag], with Virbai. Virbai returned home to Jalaram, as instructed by the celestial voice with Danda & Jholi. This Danda and Jholi are still at Virpur and kept on display in a glass enclosure.

Jalaram Bapa died on February 23, 1881, at the age of 81. Some of his devout followers believe that even after his death, Jalaram Bapa would make unusual miracles happen. One of these being that he fed one of his sisters water, a few hours after he died.

== Family ==
Jalaram Bapa and Virbai had a daughter named Jamnaben from their marriage. Jamnaben's grandson Harirambhai was adopted by Shri Jalaram Bapa and his direct descendant, Giridhar Bapa and his son Jaisukhram Bapa and Raghuram Bapa now head the gadi of revered Virpur shrine of Jalaram Bapa.

== Virpur ==
Virpur was the workplace of Shri Jalaram Bapa. The main shrine of Jalaram Bapa is located at Virpur. The shrine is actually the house complex where Jalaram lived during his lifetime. The shrine houses the belongings of Jalaram and the deities of Rama, Sita, Lakshman and Hanuman worshipped by him. It also has on display the Jholi and Danda said to have been given to him by God. But the main attraction here is the portrait of Jalaram Bapa. There is also an actual black and white photo of Jalaram Bapa, taken a year before his death.

The temple is one of a kind in the world in a way that it has not been accepting any offerings since February 9, 2000.

== Parchas ==
Devotees of Jalaram Bapa believe that if they pray to the saint sincerely, he blesses them and fulfils their wishes. These experiences are known as Parchas. They pray to Jalaram Bapa and if their wish is fulfilled, they fast and visit a temple on Thursday. There are many devotees of Jalaram Bapa who worship him like a God, similar to Sai Baba of Shirdi.

So far, there is only one book written on Jalaram Bapa, titled "Tales of Shri Jalaram Bapa" by Chirag Sheth & Yuvraj Sheth, which is available on most online websites.

== Jalaram Jayanti ==
Jalaram Bapa's birthday is celebrated on 7th day Shukla paksha of the Hindu month of Kartika as Jalaram Jayanti. It falls on seventh day from Diwali. On this day, devotees are served meal as prasad. There is a huge fair and festival at Virpur on the occasion and millions of devotees visit Virpur, on this day to pay their respect to the saint and have prasad of chiefly khichdi with boondi and the popular farsan item Ganthiya. The Jalaram Jayanti celebrations are also held at all Jalaram temples across India & abroad with festivities, where devotees participate to pay their respects and have prasad.

== Temples ==
One of the famous temple of Jalaram Bapa is located at a small town named Virpur, 60 kms from Rajkot. People follow good work done by Jalaram bapa here and whole heartedly pray daily in the temple. Trustees made a rule since inception in 1992 to serve all devotees blissful meals as "Prasad" without accepting any offerings by devotees everyday

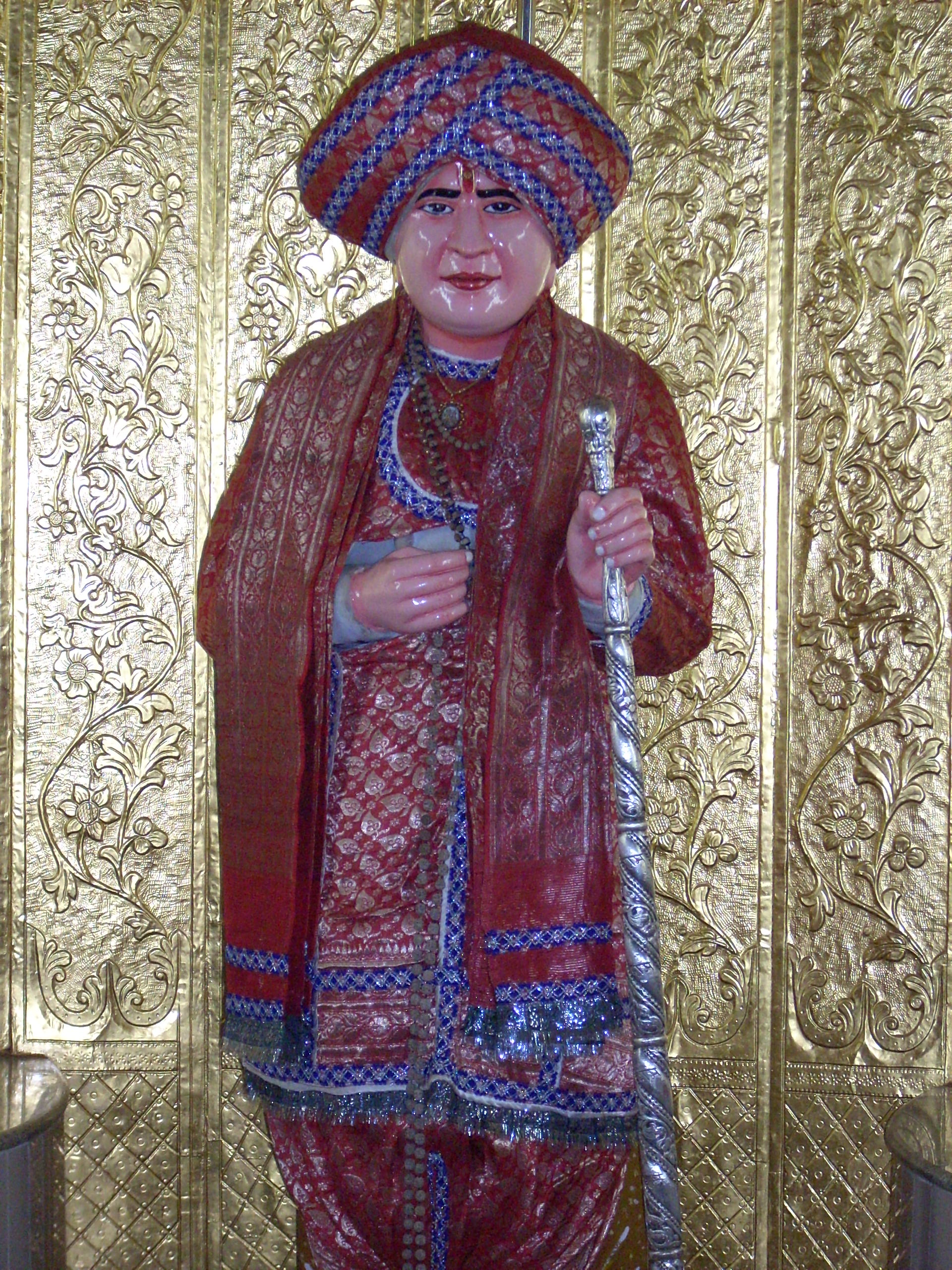
Jalaram Bapa idol at a temple in Vadodara, dressed in colorful attire on occasion of Jalaram Jayanti holding a danda and wearing a turban.

The idol of Jalaram Bapa is shown as a smiling man holding danda and wearing often a white paghadi and white dhoti-kurta. The deities of his patron deities Rama, Sita, Lakshmana and Hanuman are also mostly found along with his idol. Temples of Jalaram Bapa today can be found in several big & small towns across India. Outside India, his temples are located in East Africa, the United Kingdom, the United States of America, Canada, Australia and New Zealand.

In Mumbai, there is a crossroad at Mulund West Colony, called 'Jalaram Chowk'. This chowk is next to Jalaram Darshan.
