= Kharedi-Virpur =

Princely state in British India

- Princely State
- 16th century–1948
- Capital: Kharedi
- Area
  - 1921: 171 km^{2} (66 sq mi)
- Population
  - 1921: 6,675
- History
  - Established: 16th century
  - Independence of India: 1948
| Succeeded by |
| India |

Kharedi-Virpur was a class three princely state in British India under Kathiawar Agency. It was ruled by Jadeja Rajput chiefs descended from the Nawanagar ruling family.

The state consisted of 13 villages covering an area of 171 square kilometres (66 sq mi) and with Virpur as its headquarters. Kharedi was a seat of rulers before the capital was shifted to Virpur. The state was known as Kharedi-Virpur. The town of Kalavad also was part of Kharedi-Virpur State.

== History ==
The house was founded in the later half of the 16th century by the Jadeja chief Bhanji Vibhaji, who subdued Kathis in the area and founded state of Virpur. Bhanji was son of Vibhaji Ravalji, the ruler of Nawanagar State, the 2nd Jam Sahib of Nawanagar who ruled Nawanagar from 1562–1569. The ruler's titled was Thakore Saheb.Mokaji, the eighth in descent from Bhanji, moved The capital to Virpur from Kharedi and repaired the old fort of the new capital. The reign of Suraji I, the successor of Mokaji, was marked by a severe devastating famine of 1813 and a number of Bhayats in consequence of not having received any relief or shelter from the State acknowledged the subordination of the States of Nawanagar and Gondal with the result that only 13 villages were left subject to the jurisdiction of the Virpur State. The last ruler was Shri Thakore Saheb Narendrasinhji Dilipsinhji jadeja of Virpur before Independence.

== See also ==
- List of Rajput dynasties
- Political integration of India
- Jadeja
