= Ramesh Tilala =

Indian politician

Rameshbhai Tilala (born 1965) is an Indian politician from Gujarat. He is a member of the Gujarat Legislative Assembly from Rajkot South Assembly constituency in Rajkot district. He won the 2022 Gujarat Legislative Assembly election, representing the Bharatiya Janata Party.

== Early life and education ==
Tilala is from Rajkot, Gujarat. He is the son of Virajibhai Naranbhai Tilala. He studied Class 7 at Shrishpar Primary School and passed the examinations in 1977. He is a businessman and his wife is also a partner in the family business. He declared assets worth Rs.175 crore in his election affidavit.

== Career ==
Tilala won from Rajkot South Assembly constituency representing Bharatiya Janata Party in the 2022 Gujarat Legislative Assembly election. He polled 101,734 votes and defeated his nearest rival, Shivlal Barasia of the Aam Aadmi Party, by a margin of 78,864 votes.
