= Derdi-Janbai =

Human settlement in Gujarat, India

Derdi-Janbai is a village and former non-salute Charan princely state on Saurashtra peninsula in Gujarat, Western India.

== See also ==
- Samadhiala Charan
