= Khodaldham =

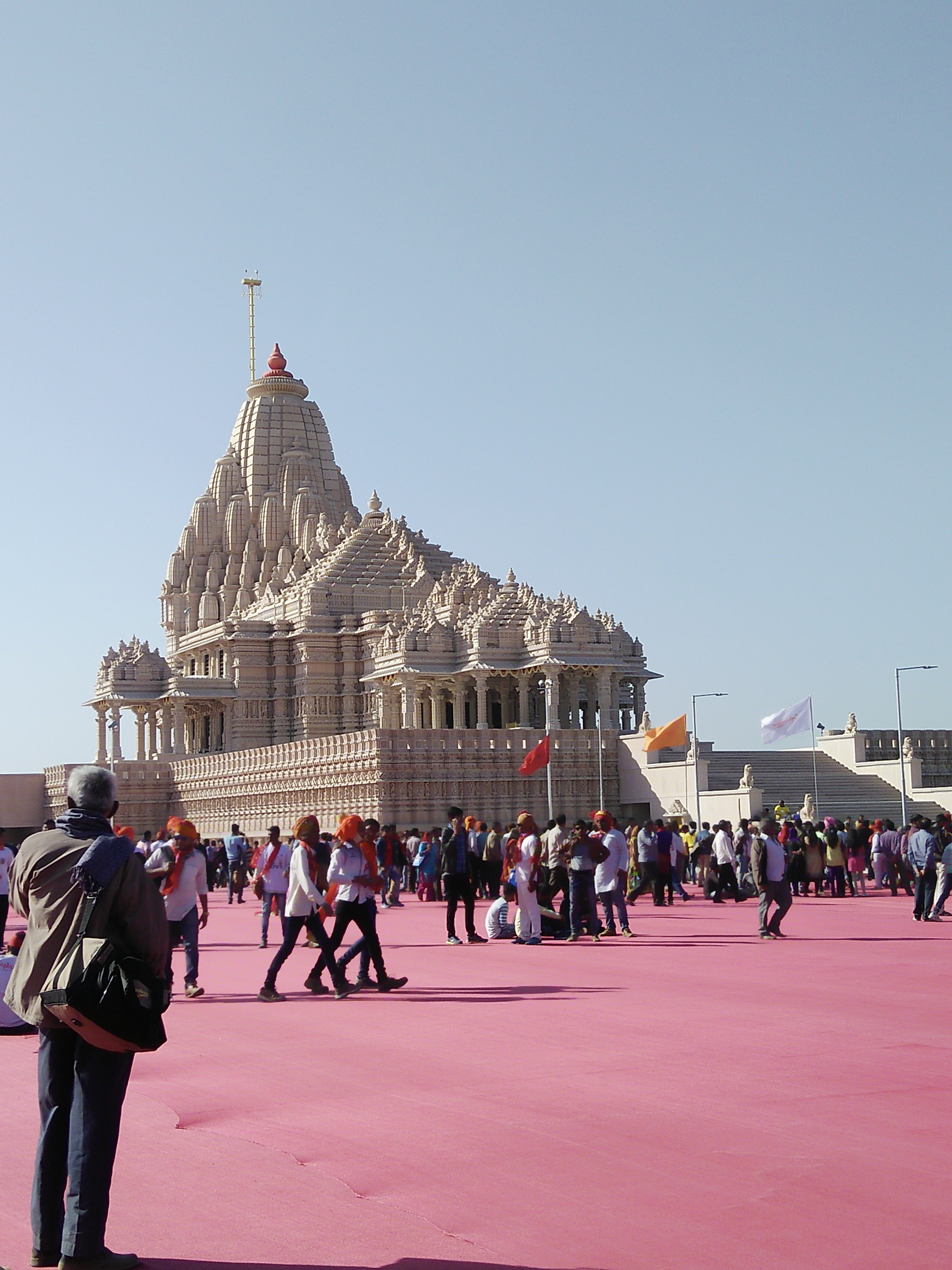
- Temple during the inauguration ceremony in 2017

- Location in Gujarat

Religion
- Affiliation: Hinduism
- District: Rajkot district
- Deity: Khodal
- Governing body: Shree Khodaldham Trust

Location
- Location: Kagvad
- State: Gujarat
- Country: India
- Interactive map of Khodaldham
- Coordinates: 21.7911687°N 70.68937556°E

Architecture
- Type: Hindu temple architecture
- Style: Maru-Gurjara architecture
- Founder: Shree Khodaldham Trust
- Groundbreaking: 2012
- Completed: 2017

Specifications
- Direction of façade: East
- Length: 289 ft (88 m)
- Width: 253 ft (77 m)
- Height (max): 159 ft 1 inch
- Site area: 158 bigha

Website
- www.khodaldhamtrust.org

Khodaldham is a Hindu temple complex dedicated to Khodal, a patron deity of Leuva Patel community, located in Kagvad in Rajkot district, Gujarat, India. The temple was opened in 2017.

== History ==
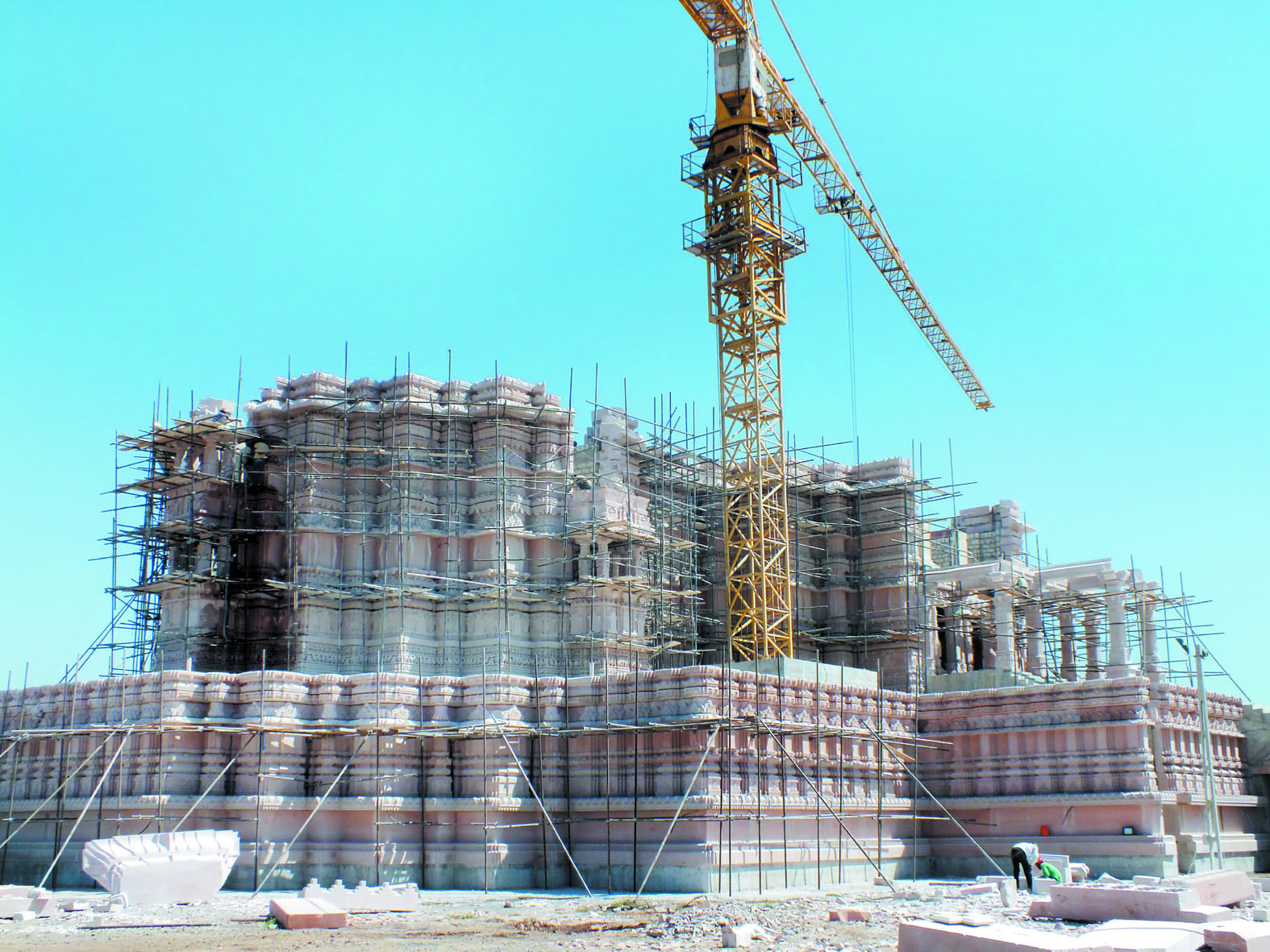
The temple under construction 2016

The temple was constructed by Shree Khodaldham Trust, an organisation of Leuva Patel community from Rajkot. The temple construction started in 2012 with laying of the foundation stone. It was inaugurated on 21 January 2017. The inauguration ceremony was attended by more than 3,00,0000 people. The temple complex was constructed in three phases over an area of 158 bigha and at cost of ₹250 crore (US$26 million).

== Architecture ==
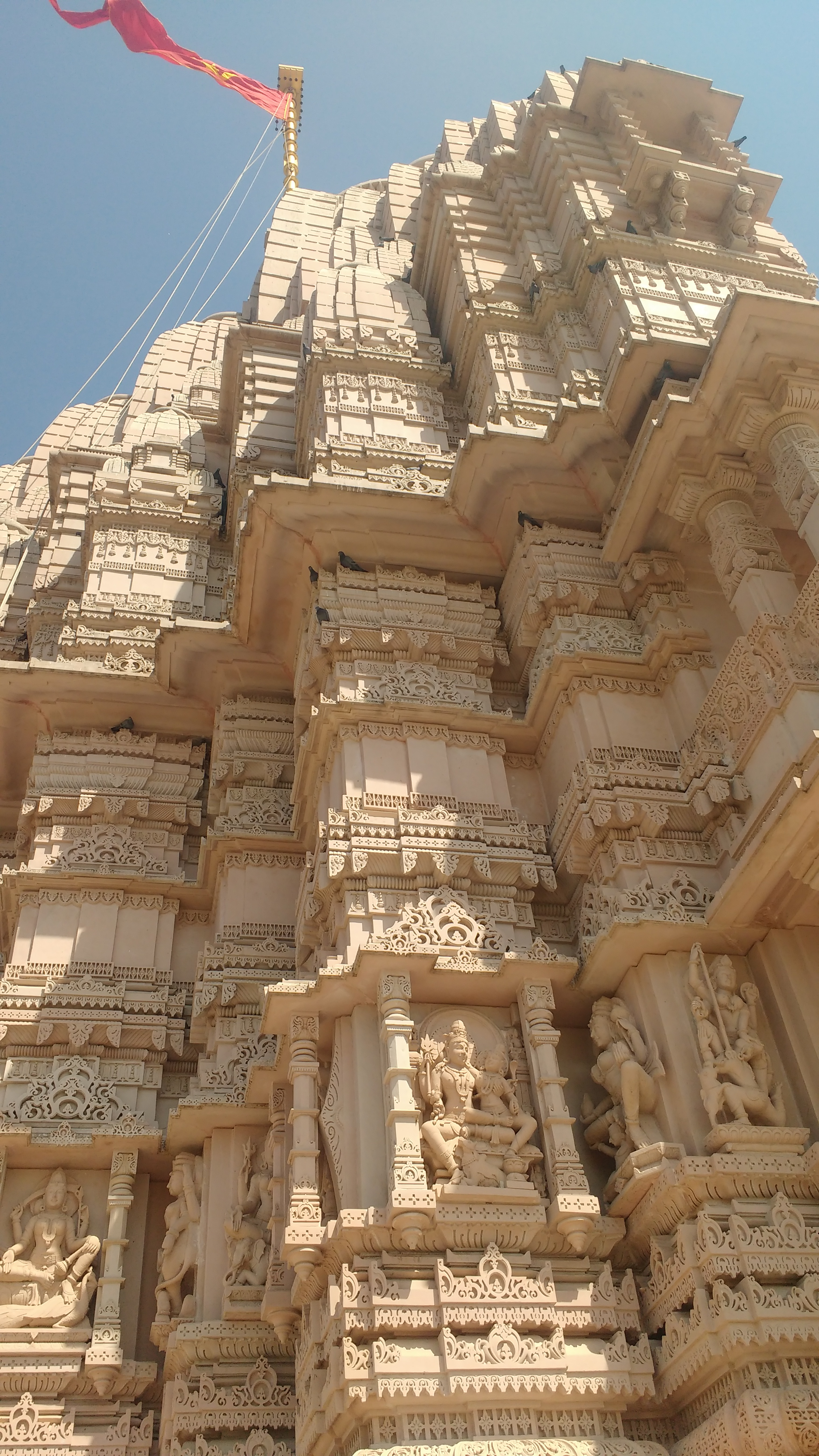
Exterior of the temple

The temple is built in Mahameru Prasad design of Maru-Gurjara architecture. It is 289 ft 7 inch long, 253 ft wide and 159 ft 1 inch high. The height of the temple is kept 10 feet lower than the Somnath temple to respect its supremacy. The primary plinth (jagati) of the temple is 18 feet high and the secondary plinth is 6 feet 5 inch high. The kalasha on the top of the temple is gold plated and 14 feet tall and weigh 6 ton. The flag mast is 40 feet high. About 650 statues adorning the exterior of the temple are chiseled by artisans from Odisha. The pillars, beams, toranas and roofs are carved by artisans from Rajasthan. The carvings include the 72 scenes from epics Mahabharata and Ramayana. About 230000 cubic feet of Bansi Paharpur pink stone is used for the construction.

The central deity of the temple is Khodal, also known as Khodiyar. Other twenty deities installed in the temple are Ganesha, Hanuman, Ram-Sita, Radha-Krishna as well as other goddesses such as Amba, Annapurna, Ashapura, Bahuchar, Butbhavani, Brahmani, Chamunda, Gatral, Gel, Harsiddhi, Mahakali, Momai, Nagbai, Randal, Sihori and Verai.

== Gallery ==
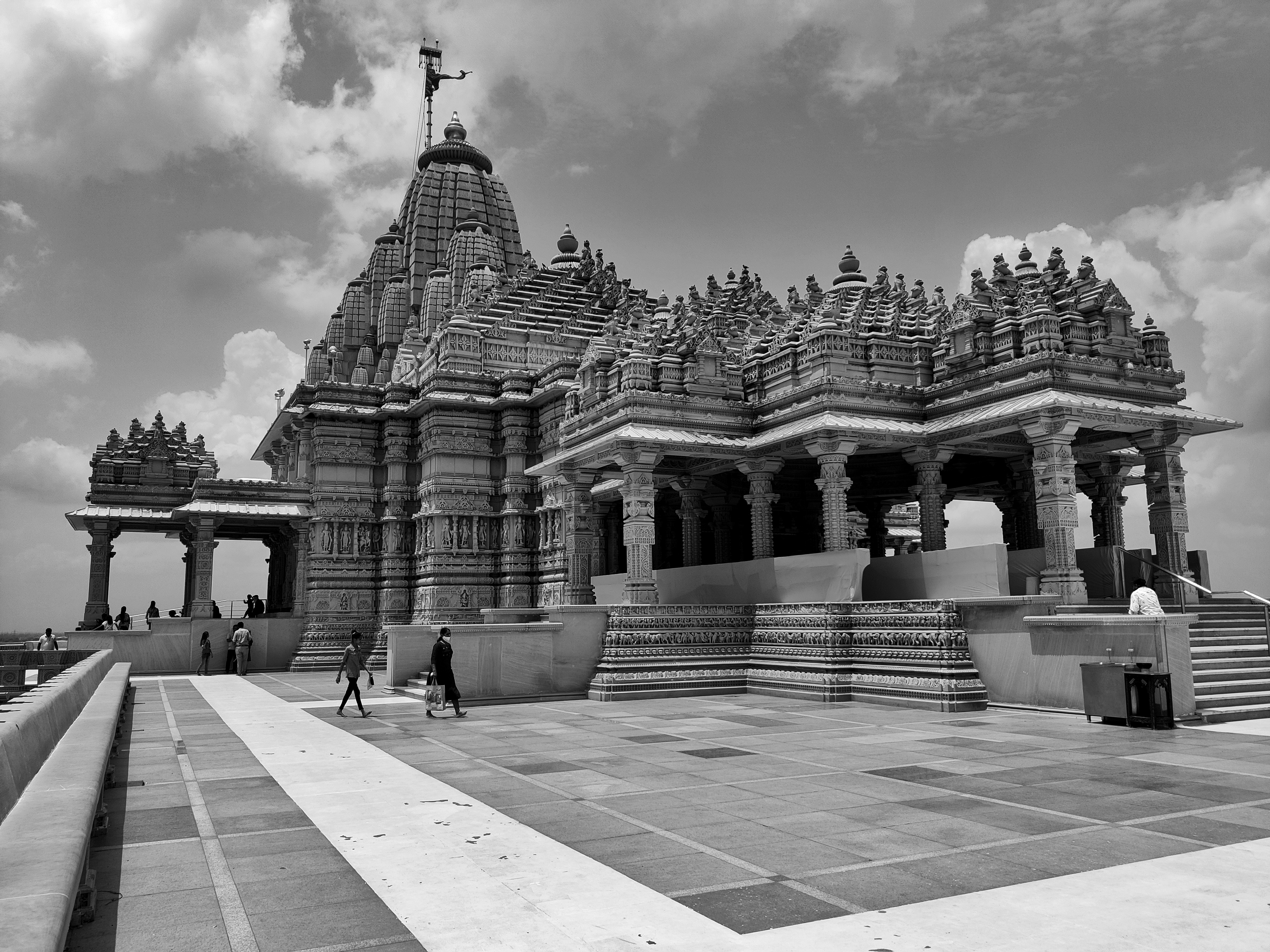
Temple from near

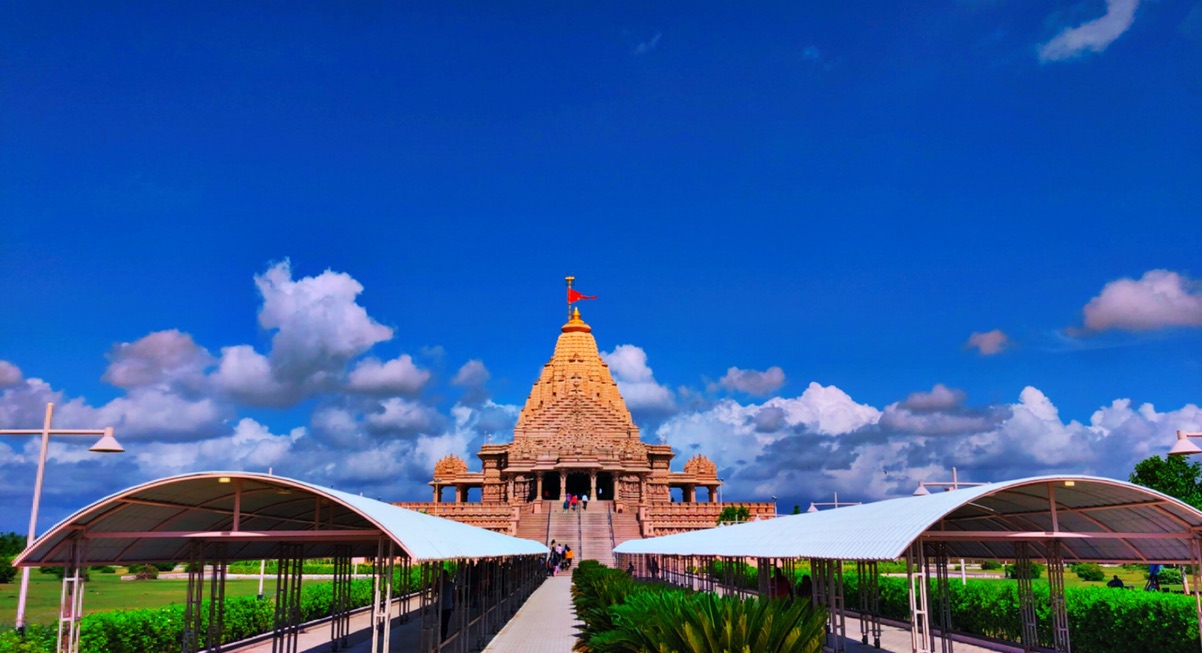
Temple from far

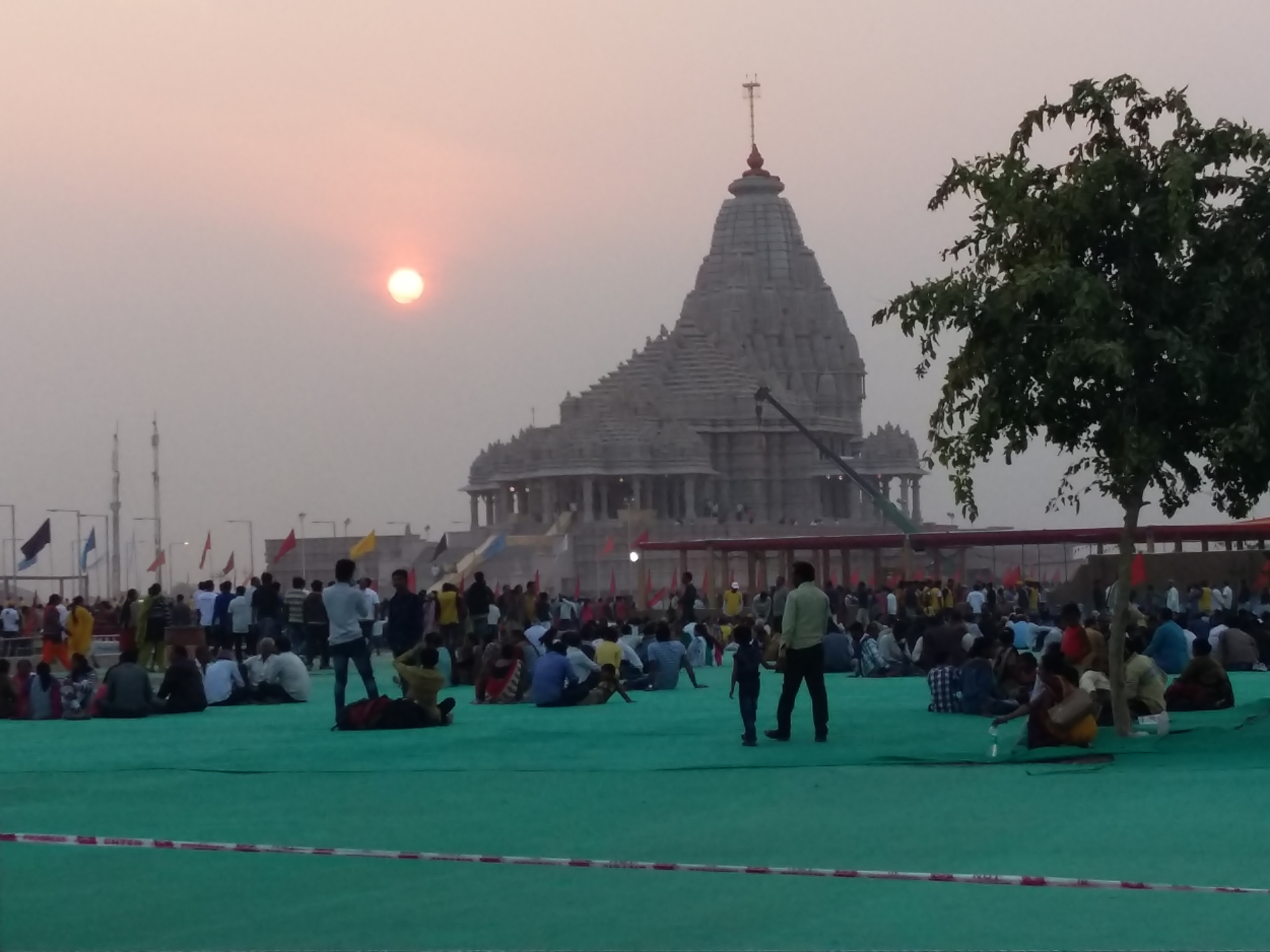
Temple during a Hindu religious gathering

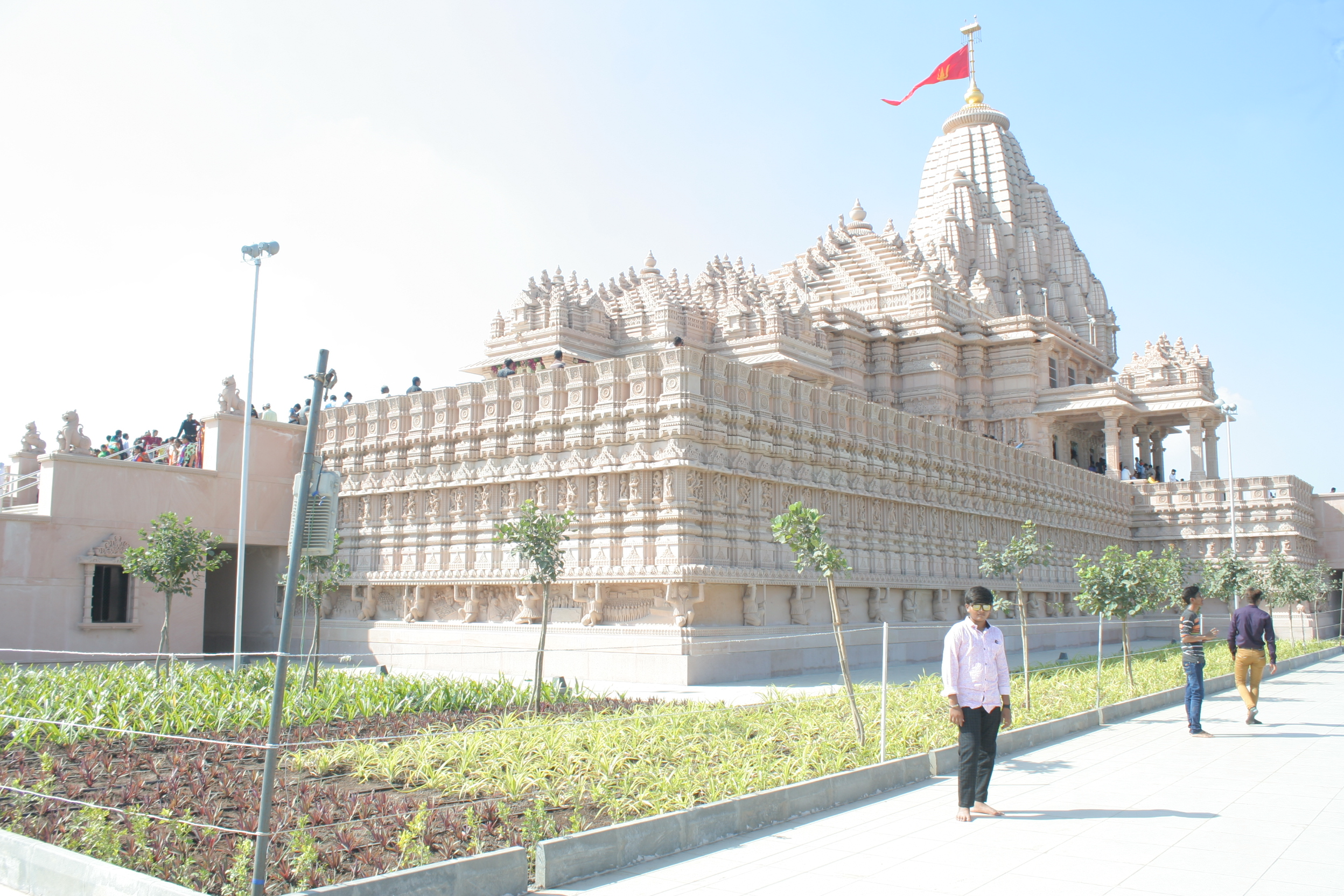
Garden outside the temple entrance

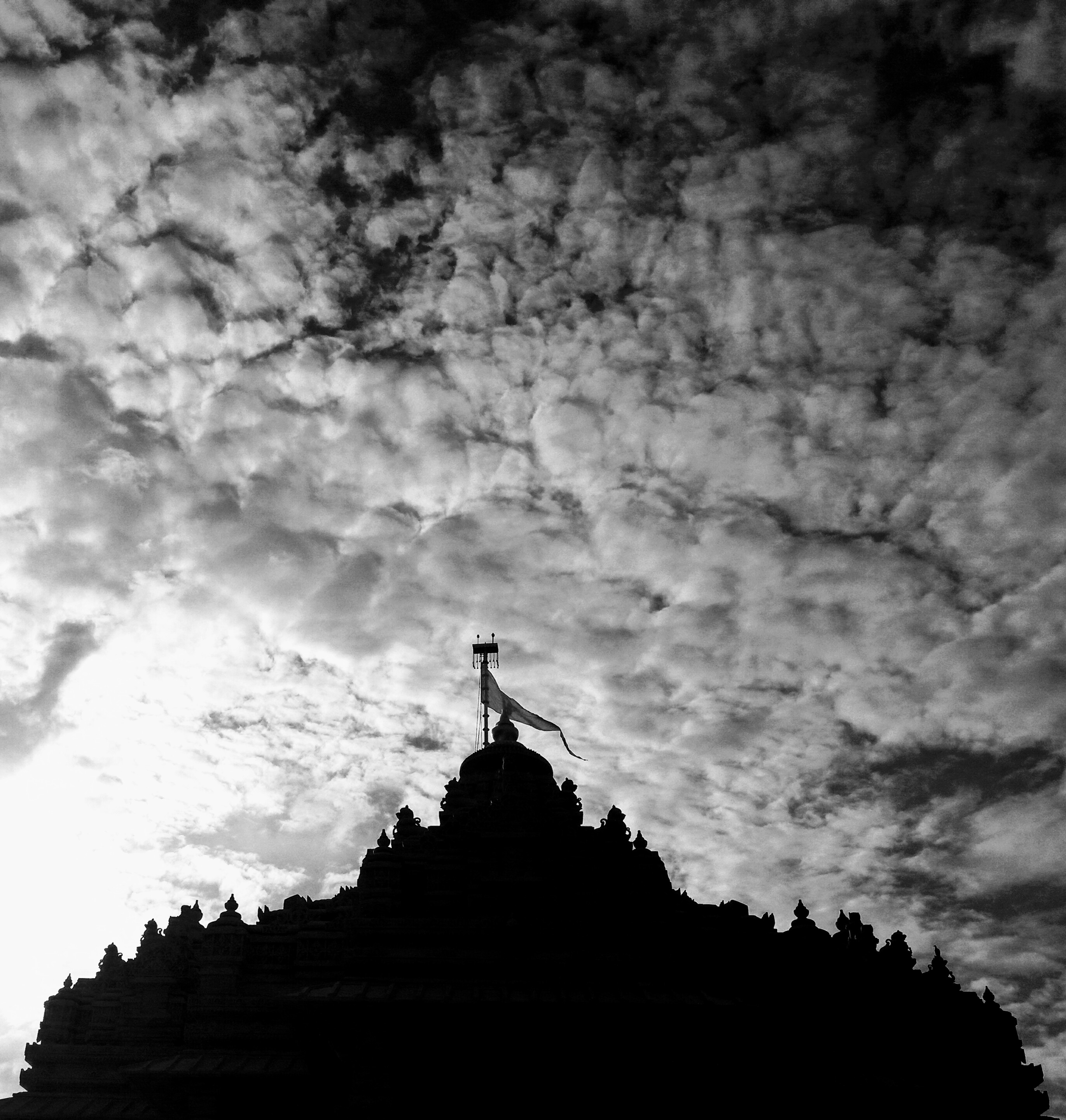
Khodiyar Mataji Dhaja and Shikhar of the temple

Khodaldham Timing

5:30 AM Campus Opening Time

9:30 PM Campus Closing Time

6:00 AM Temple Opening Time

9:00 PM Temple Closing Time

7:00 AM Morning Aarti Time

7:00 PM Evening Aarti Time

8:00 AM Office Opening Time

8:00 PM Office Closing Time

11:00 AM Restaurant Opening Time for Afternoon

2:00 PM Restaurant Closing Time for Afternoon

7:00 PM Restaurant Opening Time for Evening

9:00 PM Restaurant Closing Time for Evening
