= Khodiyar =

Hindu goddess

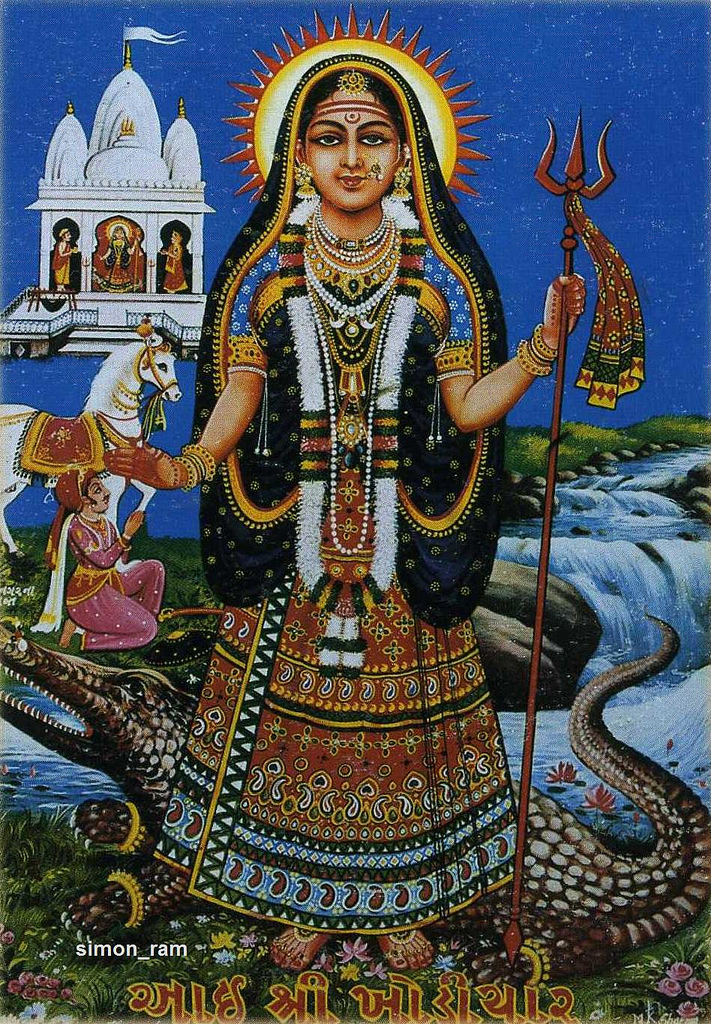
- Modern depiction of Khodiyar
- Affiliation: Devi, Shakti
- Weapon: Trident
- Mount: Crocodile
- Parents: Mamadiya Gadhvi

Khoḍiyār is a Hindu folk goddess worshiped in Gujarat and Rajasthan states in India.

== Legends ==
=== Śrī Khoḍiyārmātā Ākhyan ===
In the late 8th century in the Maitraka kingdom, a Cāraṇ named Mamadiya Gaḍhvī lived near the capital of Vallabhi. He had close relations to the king but no children. The merchants of the kingdom were jealous of Mamadiya, so they told the royal priest (purohit) to tell the queen that to look upon an infertile man runs the risk of becoming infertile oneself. The queen thus convinced the king to banish the bard from the royal court.

Mamadiya then went to a Śiva temple in the wilderness to fast and pray for children. On the 8th day Śiva appeared and granted Gaḍhvī seven daughters and a son. Several years later the girls were playing on a hill when they suddenly had a thirst for the blood and hunger for the flesh of buffaloes, which happened to be at the bottom of the hill. The girls raced down and tore the largest buffalo apart and ate his flesh and blood. The girls become infamous as they ate more and more buffaloes.

The king of Vallabhi did not practice buffalo sacrifice but instead used buffaloes to fight in sport with other kings with the stakes being land. Once the king's finest buffalo was missing, and the king and his soldiers eventually found the seven sisters gorging themselves on the buffalo. The king ordered the girls to be burned alive, but a voice from heaven said "'You unjustly chased our father for his barrenness: now, your own line will have no issue'". The king begged for mercy and he was given the option of having children if he "'married among the people'".

When the girls grew up they left home together, but the youngest named Khoḍiyār was lame and could not keep up with the others. She fell upon the ground and prayed to the goddess Jagdambā to take her to her realm. However, goddesses told her from heaven that she was given a limp for a purpose, and they she had all the goddess' divine powers and would become the greatest of the sisters.

=== Chudasama Dynasty ===
Rā Dāyas of the Chudasama dynasty ruling at Junāgaḍh and his wife Somāldī were childless, and as a result of Somāldī's prayers to Khoḍiyār, they were granted a son. Soon the king of Gujarat invaded Junāgaḍh, killed Dāyas, and appointed a governor. Somāldī entrusted the care of her baby son, Navghaṇ, to her maidservant and then committed satī.

The maidservant took Navghaṇ to an Ahīr chief in southern Saurāṣṭra, who raised Navghaṇ amongst his own children, including his daughter Jāsal. However, the governor of Junāgaḍh suspected that Dāyas' son was still alive and ordered his death. The Ahīr chief admitted he had the boy, but sent his own son to be killed instead of Navghaṇ, and eventually became close with the governor.

When the time for Jāsal's marriage came in 1025 CE, her marriage was celebrated at Junāgaḍh and the governor's soldiers became drunk. The Ahīr chief had a dream in which Khoḍiyār had told him the location of buried treasure. The chief used the treasure to buy weapons to overthrow the governor while his soldiers were drunk at Jāsal's wedding feast. The Ahīr chief then placed Navghaṇ on the throne, with Jāsal placing the tikā on his forehead with her own finger blood. Thus Khoḍiyār became the clan goddess (kuldevī) of the Cuḍāsamas.

Years later when Navghaṇ was on campaign in Sindh, he met a Cāraṇ girl who was the incarnation of Khoḍiyār. She caused the waters of the Rann of Kachh to part to let Navghaṇ's army pass. After defeating the Sūmrās of Sindh, Navghaṇ built a temple to Khoḍiyār in Jūnāgaḍh.

=== Gohil dynasty ===
In Saurāṣṭra the chief of Sihor was Gohil Śādulsīnhjī; one day a Cāraṇ visited him and sang in praise of Khoḍiyār, who he said was a form of Ambikā-Bhavānī. The next day Śādulsīnhjī went to Khoḍiyār's birthplace hoping to get a darśan of her. At her birthplace he met an old woman who he realized was the goddess, and after pressing her she revealed herself in her form as a young woman standing on a crocodile with a trident in hand. She told him to build a temple to her nearby on a small hill near a spring marked with a hand in red. Thus forth she became the kuldevī of the Gohil dynasty.

== Temples ==
In 1875, Monier Williams visited a shrine to Khoḍiyār in a village in rural Gujarat. He noted that when the disease broke out in the village, Khoḍiyār was propitiated with many offerings, including those of animal meat and blood.

In recent years Khoḍiyār, along with other goddesses of western India, had become vegetarian and thus less fierce in character. Animal sacrifice was banned in Gujarat in 1971.

== See also ==
- Khodaldham
- Nartiang Durga Temple
- Hinglaj Mata mandir
- Hanuman temple, Salangpur
