= Rajkot South Assembly constituency =

Legislative Assembly constituency in Gujarat State, India

Coordinates: 22.32°N 70.79°E

Rajkot South
- Constituency No. 70 for the Gujarat Legislative Assembly

Constituency details
- Country: India
- Region: Western India
- State: Gujarat
- District: Rajkot
- Lok Sabha constituency: Rajkot
- Established: 2008
- Total electors: 258,831
- Reservation: None

Member of Legislative Assembly
- 15th Gujarat Legislative Assembly
- Incumbent Rameshbhai Virjibhai Tilala
- Party: Bharatiya Janata Party
- Elected year: 2022

Rajkot South is one of the 182 Legislative Assembly constituencies of Gujarat state in India. It is part of Rajkot district and it came into existence after 2008 delimitation.

== List of segments ==
This assembly seat represents the following segments

1. Rajkot Taluka (Part) – Rajkot Municipal Corporation (Part) Ward No. – 1, 2, 3, 4, 6, 7, 8, 9, 10.

== Member of Legislative Assembly ==
Year	Member	Party
2007	Govind Patel	Bharatiya Janata Party
2012	Govind Patel	Bharatiya Janata Party
2017	Govind Patel	Bharatiya Janata Party
2022	Rameshbhai Virjibhai Tilala	Bharatiya Janata Party

== Election results ==
=== 2022 ===
Gujarat Assembly election, 2022: Rajkot South
Party	Candidate	Votes	%	±%
BJP	Ramesh Tilala	101734	66.37	
AAP	Shivlal Barasia	22870	14.92	
INC	Hitesh Maganbhai Vora	22507	14.68	
Independent	Parekh Punitaben Hasmukhbhai	2842	1.85	
NOTA	None of the Above	2353	1.54	
Majority			51.45	
Turnout				
Registered electors		257,154		
BJP hold		Swing		

=== 2017 ===
Gujarat Legislative Assembly Election, 2017: Rajkot South
Party	Candidate	Votes	%	±%
BJP	Govind Patel	98,951	63.18	+6.73
INC	Dr. Dinesh Chovatiya	51,830	33.09	−2.57
Majority		47,121	30.09	+9.29
Turnout		1,56,612	64.58	−0.07
Registered electors		242,500		
BJP hold		Swing		

=== 2012 ===
2012 Gujarat Legislative Assembly election: Rajkot South
Party	Candidate	Votes	%	±%
BJP	Govind Patel	77,308	56.45	
INC	Mitul Donga	48,831	35.66	
Majority		28,477	20.80	
Turnout		1,36,938	64.65	
BJP win (new seat)				

== See also ==
- List of constituencies of Gujarat Legislative Assembly
- Gujarat Legislative Assembly
