= Govind Patel =

Indian politician

Govindbhai Ukabhai Patel

MLA of Gujarat
- Incumbent
- Assumed office 2007
- Constituency: Rajkot South

Personal details
- Party: Bharatiya Janata Party

Govind Patel is an Indian politician associated with Bharatiya Janata Party. He was a State Minister for Energy & Petrochemicals and Science & Technology. He is a Member of Legislative assembly from Rajkot South constituency in Gujarat for its 12th, 13th and 14th legislative assembly.
