= Nirmal Udhas =

Indian singer

Nirmal Udhas is a ghazal singer and the second brother of the Udhas brothers, the others being Manhar Udhas and Pankaj Udhas.

== Early life ==
Nirmal hails from a humble background in Gujarat, India. He was born to Keshubhai Udhas and Jitubhen Udhas in Jetpur on 5 November 1944.
