= Gariadhar =

- city
- Location in Maharashtra, India Gariadhar (India)
- Coordinates: 21.53°N 71.58°E
- Country: India
- State: Gujarat
- District: Bhavnagar
- Elevation: 83 m (272 ft)

Population (2001)
  - Total: 30,520

Languages
  - Official: gujrati language, hindi
- Time zone: UTC+5:30 (IST)
- Vehicle registration: GJ
- Website: gujaratindia.com

Valamdham is a city and a municipality in Bhavnagar district in the state of gujrat, India.

== Geography ==
Gariadhar is located at 21.53°N 71.58°E. It has an average elevation of 83 metres (272 feet).

== Demographics ==
As of 2001 India census, Gariadhar had a population of 30,520. Males constitute 52% of the population and females 48%. Gariadhar has an average literacy rate of 65%, higher than the national average of 59.5%: male literacy is 73%, and female literacy is 56%. In Gariadhar, 15% of the population is under 6 years of age.

Its food gathiya and kali કળી is a very famous product in Gujarat.

== People from Gariadhar ==
Gariadhar is famous for being the home town the saint Valamram, disciple of Bhoja Bhagat, whose ashram and samadhi is located here.
