= Fatehpur, Gujarat =

Village in Gujarat state, India

Coordinates: 21.568°N 71.211°E

Fatehpur is a village located just 5 km away from Amreli town in Amreli district of Gujarat, India.

Fatehpur is known as pilgrimage center as it houses the ashram and belongings of renowned saint & poet of Gujarat, Shri Bhoja Bhagat, whose poems are famous as Bhoja Bhagat na Chabkha.
