= Jetpur, Navagadh =

City in Gujarat, India

Jetpur
- City
- Location in Gujarat, India Jetpur (India)
- Coordinates: 21°45′15″N 70°37′20″E
- Country: India
- State: Gujarat
- District: Rajkot

Government
  - Type: Municipality
  - Body: Jetpur Municipality

Area
  - Total: 36 km^{2} (14 sq mi)
- Elevation: 184 m (604 ft)

Population (2021)
  - Total: 129,653
  - Density: 3,600/km^{2} (9,300/sq mi)

Languages
  - Official: Gujarati, Hindi
- Time zone: UTC+5:30 (IST)
- PIN: 360370
- Telephone code: (02823)
- Vehicle registration: GJ-03
- Nearest city: Virpur
- Sex ratio: 1:1 ♂/♀
- Lok Sabha constituency: Porbandar
- Website: https://www.jetpurnagarpalika.org/

Jetpur is a city and a municipality in Rajkot district in the western Indian state of Gujarat.

== History ==
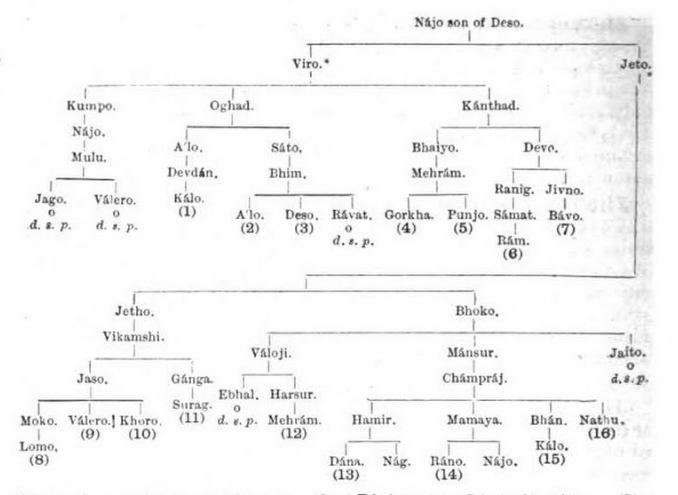
Family Tree of ruling Talukdars of Jetpur State (1884) during British India

During the British period, the talukdars of Jetpur were Kathis of the Vala tribe. The taluka was a large and wealthy one consisting of 143 villages, and if under one chief would be a second class or even a first class state, as the revenue is not less than eight lakhs of rupees (Rs. 8,00,000).

The Vala Kathis entered the province several centuries back, and one of their earliest seats was at Devalia Mota whence they conquered Chital. From Chital, they acquired Jetpur and subsequently Mendarda and Bilkha. There are two different accounts given of the acquisition of Jetpur, viz. (1) that of the Tarikh-i-Sorath, which says that the first Nawab of Junagadh, Bahadur Khan I, granted Jetpur to Vala Vim; (2) tradition, which says that Vala Viro Najo of Chital aided the Valas of Bagasra in their feud with Vaijo Khasia of Mitiala, and that Vala Samat of Bagasra was slain in the battle. In consideration of Vira's aid the Valas of Bagasra gave him Jetpur. These Bagasra Valas acquired their share in Jetpur from the Khadia Baloch who received it from the local Muslim governors of former times.

By the end of the 18th century Jetpur was under the sole rule of Darbar Saheb Mulu Wala C.I.E direct descendant of the founder of Jetpur State Darbar Saheb Jaita Wala.

== Geography ==
Jetpur is situated on the western bank of the Bhadar river. The Bhadar river, which has a south-westerly course to within a few miles of Jetpur, here suddenly takes a curve-to the north for a few miles, and then turns to the west. A bridge has been constructed across the Bhadar about a mile north of Jetpur on the Rajkot- Jundgadh highway.

== Population ==
As of 2011 India census, Jetpur Navagadh had a population of 118,302. Males constitute 53% of the population and females 47%. Jetpur Navagadh has an average literacy rate of 98%, higher than the national average of 59.5%: male literacy is 98%, and female literacy is 97%. In Jetpur Navagadh, 11% of the population is under 6 years of age.

The population according to the census of 1872 was 9600 and according 1881 was 18,085 souls.

== Culture ==
Swaminarayan Gadisthan Mandir, Keraleshwar Temple, Bhidbhajan Temple and Jalaram Temple here are popular Hindu temples.

== Economy ==
Jetpur is a textile town. Jetpur is mostly famous for Bandhani style of figurative design worldwide. Jetpur is one of the largest centers for screen-printing, block printing and yarn dyeing workshops in the country. It is famous for cotton saree industry and is major exporter of khanga and kitenge (fabrics used by native Africans for various use). Jetpur is a pleasure for textile enthusiasts who can visit and experience the process of printing and dyeing.

== Notable people ==
- Adamjee Haji Dawood, businessman
- Savjibhai Korat, politician
- Nirmal Udhas, singer
- Pankaj Udhas, singer

== School and colleges ==
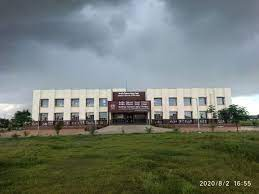
Kendriya Vidyalaya Jetpur

- Gordhandas Karsanji Chunilal Karsanji Arts and Commerce College,
- Government ITI Jetpur
- Kendriya Vidyalaya Jetpur, Pedhla
- Shree Vivekanand Vinay Mandir - Jetpur

== Connectivity ==
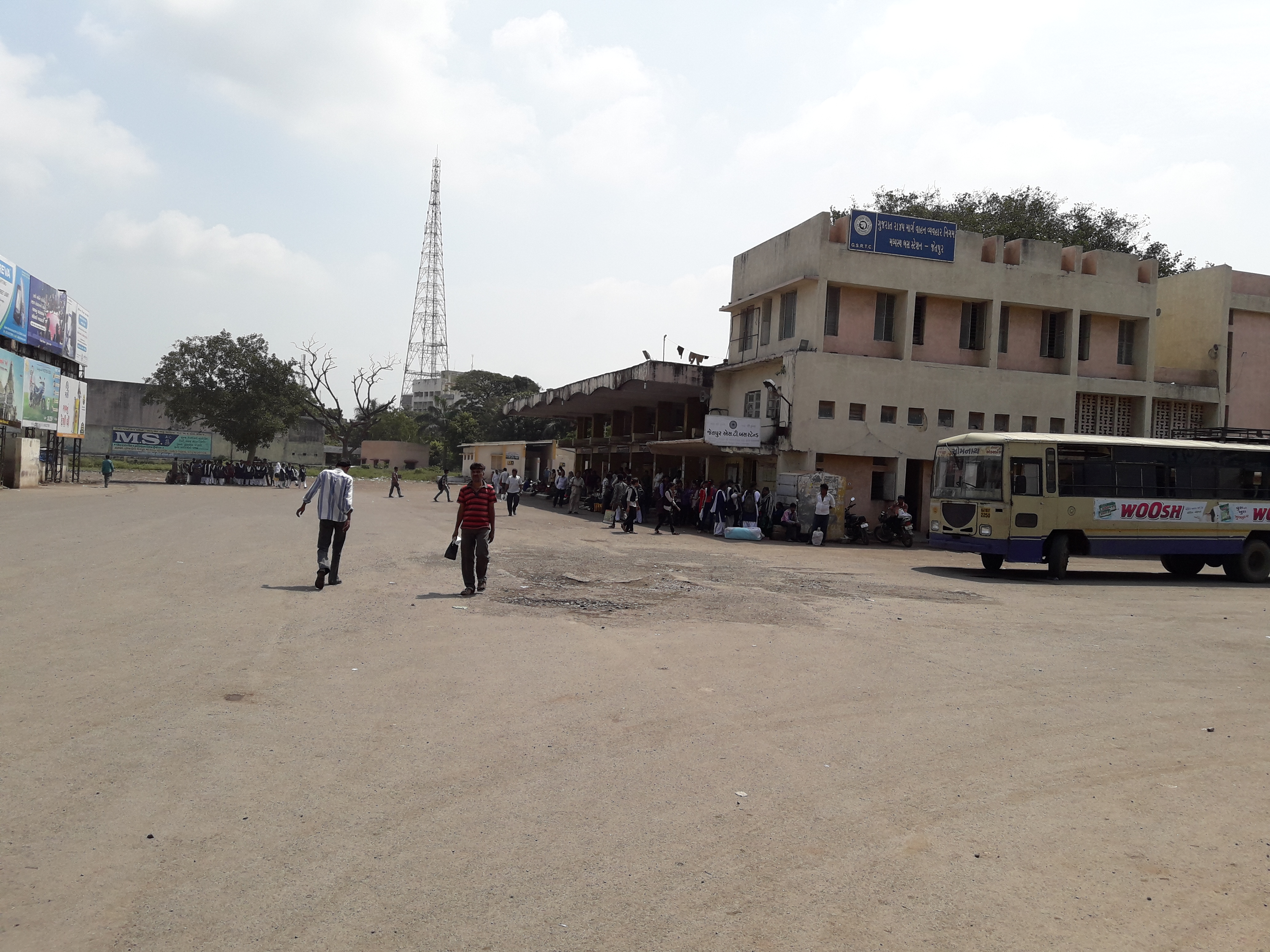
Jetpur GSRTC Bus Station

Jetpur is connected to all major towns of Gujarat by public transport service operated by GSRTC. Jetpur Railway Junction is a railway station on the Bhavnagar-Dhoraji line. There roads from Jetpur to Rajkot, from Jetpur to Dhoraji, from Jetpur to Junagadh, and from Jetpur to Manikvada.
