= Pankaj Udhas =

Indian singer (1951–2024)

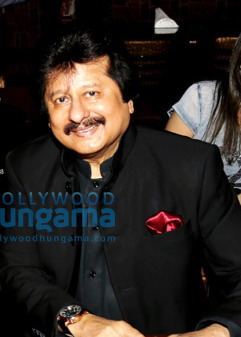
- Udhas in 2015

Background information
- Born: 17 May 1951; Jetpur, Saurashtra (now in Gujarat), India
- Died: 26 February 2024 (aged 72) Mumbai, Maharashtra, India
- Musical career
- Genre: Ghazals
- Occupation: Ghazal Singer
- Instruments: Vocals, Harmonium, Guitar, Piano, Violin, Tabla
- Years active: 1980–2024
- Labels: EMI, T-Series
- Awards Padma Shri (2006)

Pankaj Udhas (17 May 1951 – 26 February 2024) was an Indian ghazal and playback singer known for his works in Hindi cinema, and Indian pop. He started his career with the release of a ghazal album titled Aahat in 1980 and subsequently recorded many hits like Mukarar in 1981, Tarrannum in 1982, Mehfil in 1983, Pankaj Udhas Live at Royal Albert Hall in 1984, Nayaab in 1985 and Aafreen in 1986. After his success as a ghazal singer, he was invited to appear and sing for a film by Mahesh Bhatt, Naam, in which his song "Chitthi Aayee Hai" (A Letter Has Arrived) became an instant hit. He did playback singing for many Hindi films after that. Albums and live concerts around the globe brought him fame as a singer. In 2006, Pankaj Udhas was awarded Padma Shri, India's fourth highest civilian award. His brothers Nirmal Udhas and Manhar Udhas are also singers. Udhas was posthumously awarded the Padma Bhushan, India's third-highest civilian award, by the Government of India in 2025.

== Early life ==
Pankaj Udhas was born in Navagadh village of Jetpur in a Charan family of Gujarat. He was the youngest of the three brothers. His parents were Keshubhai Udhas and Jituben Udhas. His eldest brother Manhar Udhas achieved some success as a Hindi playback singer in Bollywood films. His second brother Nirmal Udhas is also a well-known Ghazal Singer and was the first of the three brothers to start singing in the family.

Udhas had studied in Sir BPTI Bhavanagar. His family moved to Mumbai and Pankaj attended St. Xavier's College there.

His family hails from a town named Navagadh near Rajkot and were zamindars (transl. traditional landlords). His grandfather was the first graduate from the village and went on to become the Diwan (revenue minister) of the Bhavnagar State. His father, Keshubhai Udhas, was a government servant and had met the renowned Veena player, Abdul Karim Khan, who taught him to play the dilruba. When Udhas was a child, his father would play the dilruba, a stringed instrument. Seeing his and his brothers' interest in music, his father enrolled them at the Sangeet Academy in Rajkot. Udhas initially enrolled himself to learn the tabla but later began learning Hindustani vocal classical music from Ghulam Qadir Khan Sahab. Udhas then moved to Mumbai to train under the tutelage of Navrang Nagpurkar, a singer from the Gwalior Gharana.

== Career ==
A song titled Chandi Jaisa Rang hai tera, sone jaise bal (i.e. Your colour is like silver, your hair is like gold) was sung by Pankaj Udhas. Pankaj Udhas' older brother, Manhar Udhas was a stage performer who aided Pankaj in his introduction to musical performance. His first stage performance was during the Sino-Indian War, when he sang "Aye Mere Watan Ke Logo" and was given Rs. 51 by an audience member as a reward.

Four years later he joined the Sangeet Natya Academy in Rajkot and learned the nuances of playing the tabla. After that, he pursued a Bachelor of Science degree at Wilson College and St Xavier's college, Mumbai and started training in Indian classical vocal music under the tutelage of Master Navrang. Udhas's first song was in the film "Kamna" a solo composed by Usha Khanna and written by Naqsh Lyallpuri, the film was a flop, but his rendition was very much appreciated. Subsequently, Udhas developed an interest in ghazals and learned Urdu to try to pursue a career as a ghazal singer. He spent ten months in Canada and the US doing ghazal concerts and returned to India with renewed vigour and confidence. His first ghazal album, Aahat, was released in 1980. From this, he began to have success and, as of 2011 he had released more than fifty albums and hundreds of compilation albums. In 1986, Udhas received another opportunity to perform in film, in the film Naam, which brought him fame. In 1990, he sang the melodious duet "Mahiya Teri Kasam" with Lata Mangeshkar, for the movie Ghayal. This song achieved immense popularity. In 1994, Udhas sang the notable song, "Na Kajre Ki Dhar", from the film Mohra along with Sadhana Sargam which also became very popular. He continued working as a playback singer, making some on-screen appearances in films such as Saajan, Yeh Dillagi, Naam and Phir Teri Kahaani Yaad Aayee. His album Shagufta launched by Music India in December 1987 was the first to be released on compact disc in India. Later, Udhas started a talent hunt television program called Aadab Aarz Hai on Sony Entertainment Television. Actor John Abraham calls Udhas his mentor. Udhas's ghazals talk about love, intoxication and sharab.

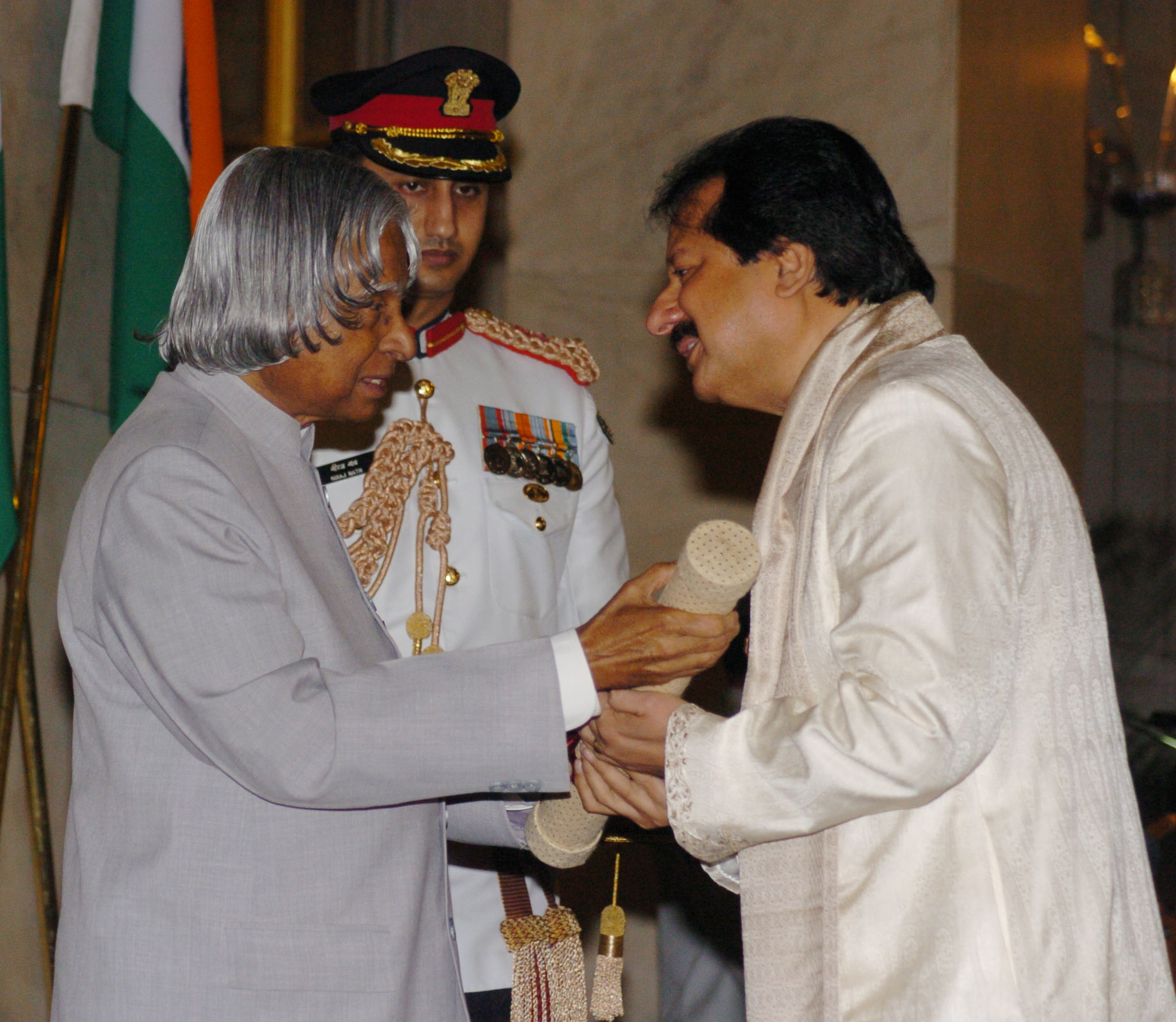
The President, Dr. A.P.J. Abdul Kalam presenting Padma Shri to renowned ghazal singer Shri Pankaj Keshubhai Udhas, at investiture ceremony in New Delhi on 29 March 2006

== Death ==
Pankaj Udhas died, aged 72, of a prolonged illness at Breach Candy Hospital in Mumbai, on 26 February 2024. His funeral was held on 27 February 2024 at the Hindu Crematorium in Worli, Mumbai. In memories of Pankaj Udas, his last ghazal was "Baithi Ho Kyun Gumsum" re-release T-series YouTube channel.

== Awards ==
- 2025: Padma Bhushan
- 2024 – Honour Lokmat Sur Jyotsna National Music legends Award 2024
- 2006 – Padma shri for his contribution to the art of ghazal singing, his huge contribution to cancer patients and thallasemic children on the occasion of him completing 25 years of ghazal singing.
- 2006 – Prestigious "Kalakar" award at Kolkata for "Hasrat" as "Best Ghazal album of 2005".
- 2004 – Special Felicitation at the Wembley Conference Center, London for Completing 20 Years of Performance at the Prestigious Venue.
- 2003 – MTV Immies Award for the successful album 'In Search of Meer'.
- 2003 – Special Achievement Award at the Bollywood Music Award, New York for Popularizing Ghazals Across the Globe.
- 2003 – Dadabhai Naoroji Millennium Award conferred by the Dadabhai Naoroji International Society for Contribution to Ghazal and the Music Industry.
- 2002 – Award for Excellence in Music Field presented by Sahyog Foundation at Mumbai.
- 2002 – Honoured by the Indo-American Chamber of Commerce.
- 2001 – Vocational Recognition Award for Outstanding Performance as a Ghazal singer presented by Rotary Club of Mumbai Downtown.
- 1999 – Bharatiya Vidya Bhavan, USA Award for extraordinary services to Indian music, especially promotion of ghazals in India and abroad. Presented at the Festival of Ghazals held in New York.
- 1998 – Indian Arts Awards Gala presented by the Mayor of the City of Jersey City.
- 1998 – Outstanding Artistic Achievement Award presented by the American Academy of Artists at Atlantic City.
- 1996 – Indira Gandhi Priyadarshani Award for Outstanding Services, Achievement and Contribution to Music.
- 1994 – Honorary Citizenship of Lubbock Texas, USA.
- 1994 – Radio Lotus Award for Outstanding Achievement and for the many songs featuring on the official hit parade of the radio. Presented by Radio Lotus, South Africa at the University of Durban.
- 1993 – Giants International Award for extraordinary efforts to achieve the highest standards in the field of music thereby motivating the entire community to pursue excellence.
- 1990 – Outstanding Young Persons' Award (1989–90) for positive leadership and distinguished services rendered to the nation. Presented by the Indian Junior Chambers.
- 1985 – K L Saigal Award for being the Best Ghazal Singer of the Year.

== Albums ==
- Aahat (1980)
- Nasha (1997)
- Mukarrar (1981)
- Tarrannum (1982)
- Mehfil (1983)
- Shamakhana
- Pankaj Udhas Live at Albert Hall (1984)
- Nayaab (1985)
- Legend
- Khazana
- Aafreen (1986)
- Shagufta
- Nabeel
- Aashiyana (1992)
- Anjana (1992)
- Ek Dhun Pyar Ki (1992)
- Rubayee
- Teen Mausam
- Geetnuma
- Kaif
- Khayaal
- Aman
- Woh Ladki Yaad Aati Hai
- Stolen Moments
- Mahek (1999)
- Ghoonghat
- Muskan
- Dhadkan
- Best of Pankaj Udhas Vol-1, 2
- Pankaj Udas 'Life Story' Vol-1, 2
- Pankaj Udhas Vol-1, 2, 3, 4
- Lamha
- Janeman
- Jashn (2006)
- Endless Love
- Shaayar
- Rajuat (Gujarati)
- Baisakhi (Punjabi)
- Yaad
- Kabhi Ansoo Kabhi Khushboo Kabhi Naghuma
- Humnasheen
- In Search of Meer (2003)
- Hasrat (2005)
- Bhalobasha (Bengali)
- Yaara – Music by Ustad Amjad Ali Khan
- Shabad – Music by Vaibhav Saxena and Gunjan Jha
- Shaayar (2010)
- Barbad Mohabbat
- Nasheela
- Sentimental (2013)
- Khamoshi Ki Aawaz (2014)
- Khwabon Ki Khahani (2015)
- Madhose
- Nayaab lamhe with Gulzar (2018)

== Tracks ==
Year of release	Song	Movies/Albums	Co-singer	Composer	Lyricist
1970	Munne Ki Amma Yeh To Bata	Tum Haseen Main Jawaan	Kishore Kumar	Shankar-Jaikishan	Rajinder Krishan
1986	Chitthi aayi hai	Naam		Laxmikant-Pyarelal	
1988	Dil Se Dil Mila, Phir Kaisa Gila, Ho Gaya Pyar	Tamacha	Sharon Prabhakar	Bappi Lahiri	
1988	Chandi Jaisa Rang Hai	Ek Hi Maqsad		Pankaj Udhas	Mumtaz Rashid
1988	Gaa Mere Sang Pyar Ka Geet Naya	Gunahon Ka Faisla	Lata Mangeshkar	Bappi Lahiri	
1988	Aaj Phir Tumpe	Dayavan	Anuradha Paudwal	Laxmikant-Pyarelal	
1988	Ek Ek Ho Jaye Phir Ghar Chale Jaana	Gangaa Jamunaa Saraswati	Pankaj Udhas & Kishore Kumar	Anu Malik	Indeevar
1988	Tere Dar Ko Chhod Chale	Gangaa Jamunaa Saraswati	Pankaj Udhas	Anu Malik	Indeevar
1989	Sahara Tere Intezaar Ka Hai	Hum Intezaar Karenge	Pankaj Udhas	Bappi Lahiri	
1989	Yaad Aayi, Yaad Aayi, Bhuli Woh Kahani Phir Yaad Aayi	Gola Barood	Pankaj Udhas & Mohammed Aziz	Bappi Lahiri	
1989	Tumne Rakh To Lee Tasveer Hamari	Lal Dupatta Malmal Ka	Pankaj Udhas & Anuradha Paudwal	Anand-Milind	Majrooh Sultanpuri
1989	Kuch Baat Hai Tum Mein Jo	Lal Dupatta Malmal Ka	Pankaj Udhas & Anuradha Paudwal	Anand-Milind	Majrooh Sultanpuri
1989	"Bhool Bhulaiyya Sa Yeh Jeevan" "Dekh Ke Tumko" "Dil Ki Baatein Hain"	Gawaahi	Pankaj Udhas & Anuradha Paudwal	Uttam-Jagdish	Sardar Anjum
1990	Maahiya Teri Kasam	Ghayal	Pankaj Udhas & Lata Mangeshkar	Bappi Lahiri	
1990	Ishq Mein Jaan Gawa Denge	Paap Ki Kamaee	Pankaj Udhas & Anuradha Paudwal		
1990	Aur Bhala Main Kya Mangun Rab Se	Thanedaar	Pankaj Udhas & Lata Mangeshkar	Bappi Lahiri	
1990	Mohabbat Inayat Karam Dekhte Hain	Bahaar Aane Tak	Pankaj Udhas & Anuradha Paudwal		
1991	Jeeye To Jeeye Kaise	Saajan	Pankaj Udhas	Nadeem Shravan	Sameer
1991	Jaane Jaan Mujhe Aisa Kya Hua	Vishkanya	Pankaj Udhas & Penaz Masani	Bappi Lahiri	
1992	Geet Banke Labon Pe	Adharm	Pankaj Udhas & Anuradha Paudwal	Anand-Milind	Sameer
1992	Dhadkane Saansein Jawani	Beta	Pankaj Udhas	Dilip Sen-Sameer Sen	Dilip Tahir
1992	Jo Geet Nahi Janma	Sangeet	Pankaj Udhas & Anuradha Paudwal	Anand-Milind	Santosh Anand
1992	Ek Pal Ek Din	Jigar	Pankaj Udhas & Sadhana Sargam	Anand-Milind	Sameer
1992	Apni Mohabbat Kabhi Kam Na Ho	Aaja Sanam	Pankaj Udhas	Arun Paudwal	Faaiz Anwar
1992	Kisi Ne Bhi To Na Dekha	Dil Aashna Hai	Pankaj Udhas	Anand-Milind	
1993	Ye Kya Kya Dikhati Hai	Meherbaan	Pankaj Udhas	Dilip Sen-Sameer Sen	Rani Malik
1993	Dil Deta Hai Ro Ro Dohai	Phir Teri Kahani Yaad Aayee	Pankaj Udhas		
1993	Rabse Bhi Pehle Honthon Pe Meresaajan Tera	Izzat Ki Roti	Pankaj Udhas & Anuradha Paudwal	Bappi Lahiri	
1993	Mat Kar Itna Guroor	Aadmi Khilona Hai	Pankaj Udhas & Alka Yagnik	Nadeem-Shravan	
1993	Aadmi Khilona Hai (male)	Aadmi Khilona Hai	Pankaj Udhas	Nadeem-Shravan	
1993	Tujhko Saanson Mein	Kasam Teri Kasam	Pankaj Udhas & Anuradha Paudwal	Naresh Sharma	Qatil Shiphai
1993	Teri Aankhen Meri Manzil	Kasam Teri Kasam	Pankaj Udhas & Anuradha Paudwal	Naresh Sharma	Faaiz Anwar
1993	Khuda Kare Mohabbat Mein	Sanam (film released in 1997)		Anand-Milind	Sameer
1993	Aankh Mere Yaar Ki Dukhe (Solo)	Ek Hi Raasta		Mahesh Kishor	Naqsh Lyallpuri
1993	Aankh Mere Yaar Ki Dukhe (Duet)	Ek Hi Raasta	Kavita Krishnamurthy	Mahesh Kishor	Naqsh Lyallpuri
1993	Chhupana Bhi Nahi Aata	Baazigar		Anu Malik	Rani Malik
1993	Mohabbaton Kaa Safar Hai (duet)	Mohabbaton Kaa Safar	Kavita Krishnamurthy	Khayyam	Salahuddin Pervez
1993	Mohabbaton Kaa Safar Hai (solo)	Mohabbaton Kaa Safar	Pankaj Udhas	Khayyam	Salahuddin Pervez
1993	Abhi Abhi Yeh Samjha Hai	Dil Apna Aur Preet Paraee		Usha Khanna	Yogesh
1994	Dil Jab Se Toot Gaya (Duet)	Salaami	Alka Yagnik	Nadeem-Shravan	Sameer
1994	Dil Jab Se Toot Gaya (Solo)	Salaami	Pankaj Udhas	Nadeem-Shravan	Sameer
1994	Aankhon Ke Kaajal Se	Main Tera Aashiq (unreleased film)	Pankaj Udhas & Anuradha Paudwal	Naresh Sharma	Deepak Sneh
1994	Main Deewana Hoon Jisse	Yeh Dillagi	Pankaj Udhas & Saif Ali Khan		
1994	Na Kajare Ki Dhaar	Mohra	Pankaj Udhas		
1994	Hothon Pe Tera Naam	Main Khiladi Tu Anari	Pankaj Udhas		
1994	Main Tumse Pyar Karta	Ghar Ki Izzat	Pankaj Udhas & Jaishree Shivram	Amar-Utpal	
1994	Rishta tera mera (male version)	Jai Vikraanta	Pankaj Udhas		
1995	Aansu Judai Ke	Milan	Pankaj Udhas	Anand-Milind	Sameer
1996	Humne Khamoshi Se Tumhe Dil Mein Basaya Hai	Majhdhaar	Pankaj Udhas	Nadeem-Shravan	
1997	Meethi Meethi Baatein	Kaalia	Pankaj Udhas & Jaishree Shivram	Anand Raj Anand	
1997	Zindagi Ko Guzarne Ke Liye	Jeevan Yudh	Pankaj Udhas & Alka Yagnik	Nadeem-Shravan	Sameer
1999	"Chandakinta Chanda"	Sparsha	Pankaj Udhas	Hamsalekha	Itagi Veeranna
1999	"Bareyada Mounada Kavite"	Sparsha	Pankaj Udhas, Kavita Krishnamurti, Archana Udupa	Hamsalekha	R. N. Jayagopal
2000	Ram Kare	Jung	Pankaj Udhas & Karsan Sagathia	Anu Malik	
2000	Teri Aashiqui	Ghaath	Pankaj Udhas & Alka Yagnik	Anu Malik	
2002	London Mein India	Yeh Hai Jalwa	Pankaj Udhas & Sukhwinder Singh	Anand Raj Anand	Dev Kohli
2004	Chandi Jaisa Rang (Live)	Ghazal E Mohabbat, Vol. 1	Pankaj Udhas		
2005	Duniya Tere Bazaar Mein	Dreams (2005 film)			
2008	Ek Toh Sharab Kam	Maan Gaye Mughal-e-Azam	Pankaj Udhas	Anu Malik	
2009	Main Dil Ki Dil Mein	Sanam Teri Kasam	Pankaj Udhas & Kumar Sanu	Nadeem-Shravan	
2010	Sai Baba Geet Sudha	Malik Ek	Pankaj Udhas	Anup Jalota	
2010	Maango Ram Te Japp Mann Mere Sau Din Safal Ganeya Pucho Sant Mero Dhan Dhan Hamare Das Tere Ki Binti Tu Sabni Thai Tujh Bin Awar	Shabad	Pankaj Udhas	Vaibhav Saxena & Gunjan Jha	Guru Granth Sahib
2011	Palchhin	Mata Ki Bhetein	Pankaj Udhas & Sanghamitra Bharali		Mohan Sharma
2011	Maiyya Pukaare Re (Duet)	Mata Ki Bhetein	Pankaj Udhas & Sanghamitra Bharali		Mohan Sharma
2011	Aarti	Mata Ki Bhetein	Pankaj Udhas & Sanghamitra Bharali		Mohan Sharma
2016	Raat Bhar Tanha Raha	Dil Toh Deewana Hai	Pankaj Udhas	Anand Raj Anand	
