= Virpur, Rajkot district =

Virpur
- Town
- Located in Gujarat, India Virpur (India)
- Coordinates: 21°45′15″N 70°37′20″E
- Country: India
- State: Gujarat
- District: Rajkot

Government
  - Type: Democracy

Population
  - Total: 11,178

Languages
  - Official: Gujarati, Hindi
- Time zone: UTC+5:30 (IST)
- PIN: 360380
- Vehicle registration: GJ-3
- Nearest city: Gondal
- Website: gujaratindia.com

Virpur is a town in Rajkot district of Gujarat, India. Virpur is the birthplace of saint Jalaram bapa and has a temple dedicated to him here which is popular among pilgrims. Virpur was established and ruled by Koli chieftain Viro Bariyo.

== Temples ==
Virparanath, Jethabapa and Jalaram Bapa are saints associated with this town and many of its religious sites. Religious sites in Virpur include:

- Jalaram bapa Mandir
- Samadhi of Jalaram Bapa – the resting place of Jalaram Bapa.
- Virparanath Mandir – Saint Virparanath Mandir is located close to Jalaram Bapa Mandir. Many pilgrims who visit Jalaram Bapa also visit this shrine. Virpur is named after Virpara Nath who lived here 400 years ago.
- Samadhi of Jetha Bapa – a sacred shrine that stands close to the Jalaram Bapa Mandir.
- Minaldevi Wav – a step-well where women pray for children.
- Ramji Mandir, situated in Tower chowk, made by Virpur King
- Swaninarayan mandir near, Jalaram bapa mandir
- Veer Hanumanji Mandir, very old, almost 300 years ago, made by Khakhi Mahatma( beside Ramji Mandir).
- Radha Krishna Mandir- towards Ramji mandir to Jalaram mandir
- Gayatri Mandir - a modern temple located east of Jalaram Bapa Mandir.
- Mankeshwar Mahadev - a temple of Lord Shiva near Minaldevi Wav
- Gala Vada Hanuman Mandir – located east of Gayatri Mandir on Navagam Road.
- Virbai Maa Mandir at Triveni Sangam – a temple dedicated to Virabhai, wife of Jalaram Bapa, located northwest of town.
- Khodiyar Mandir - located southwest of Mavtar Vrudhashram [old age home] in the outskirts of the town.
- Shree KhodalDham, Kagvad - a massive modern temple of Khodiyar Maa at southwest .

== Jalaram Mandir ==
Jalaram was a Hindu saint from Gujarat, India. He was born in Virpur, Rajkot district, Gujarat, India, on 4 November 1799, which is the 7th day Krishna Paksha of Kartik month on the Hindu calendar VS year 1856, one week after the Hindu festival of Diwali. His father was Pradhan Thakkar and his mother was Rajbai Thakkar, who belonged to Lohana, a merchant clan. He was a devotee of the Hindu god Rama. Numerous temples across the world have been built in his name. The main shrine of Jalaram Bapa is located at Virpur. The shrine is actually the housing complex where Jalaram bapa lived during his lifetime. The shrine houses the belongings of Jalaram bapa and the deities of Rama, Sita, Lakshmana and Hanuman worshipped by him. It also has on display the Jholi and Danda said to be given to him by God, however the main attraction is the portrait of Jalaram Bapa. There is also a black and white photo of Jalaram Bapa, taken one year before his death. Millions of followers visit Virpur on the anniversary of Jalaram Bapa's birth, which is celebrated as Jalaram Jayanti. on the seventh day of the bright fortnight in the Hindu calendar month on Kartika. There are many guest houses in Virpur to accommodate tourists and pilgrims. Money is not accepted at the Jalaram Bapa temple. Some Dharamshalas serve food to visitors free of cost and without taking a donation.

Virpur's economy is largely supported by tourism for pilgrims and visitors.

== Connectivity ==
The nearest towns are Gondal, Jetpur and Dhoraji. The nearest airport is Rajkot Airport.
