= Rajkot district =

- District of Gujarat
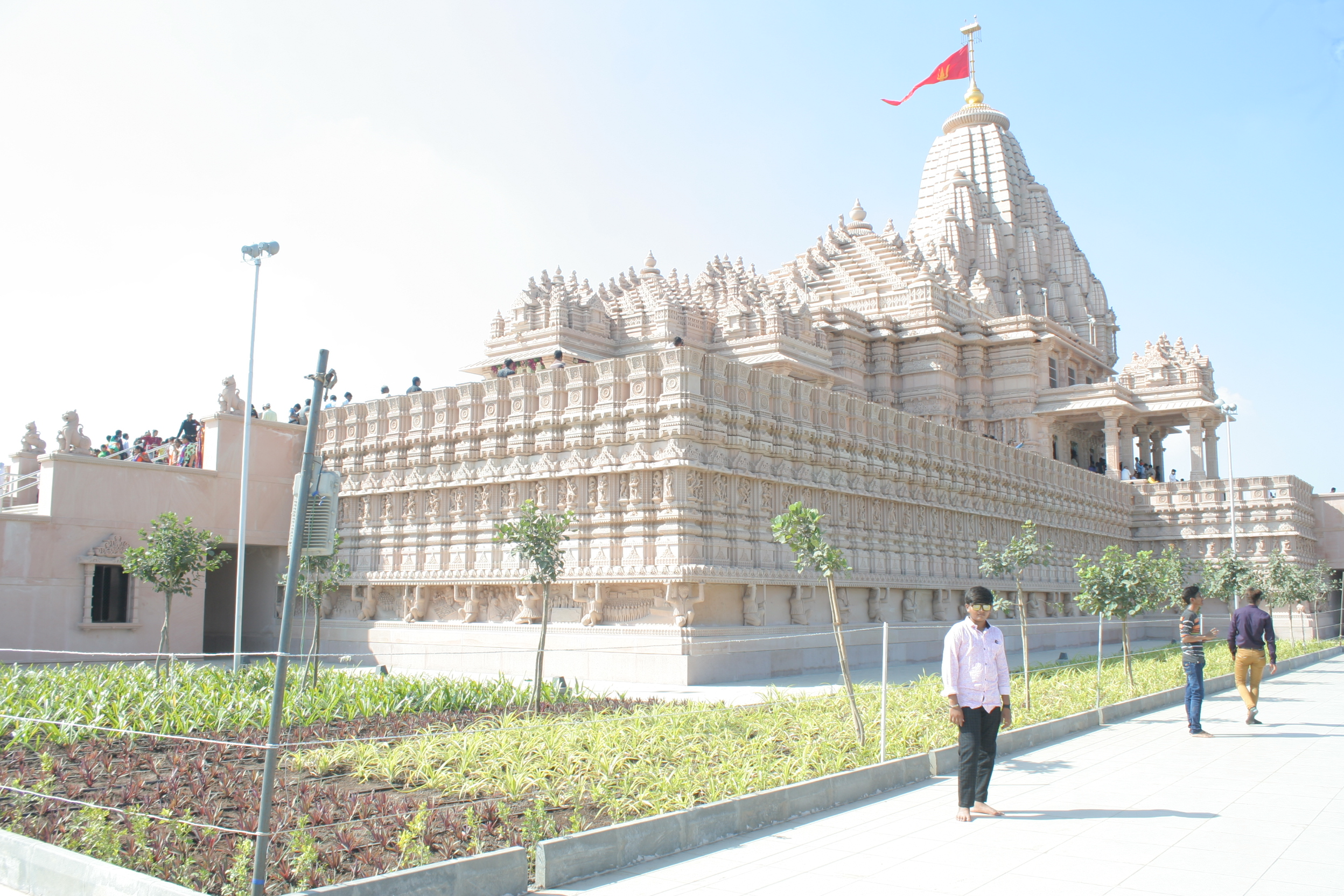
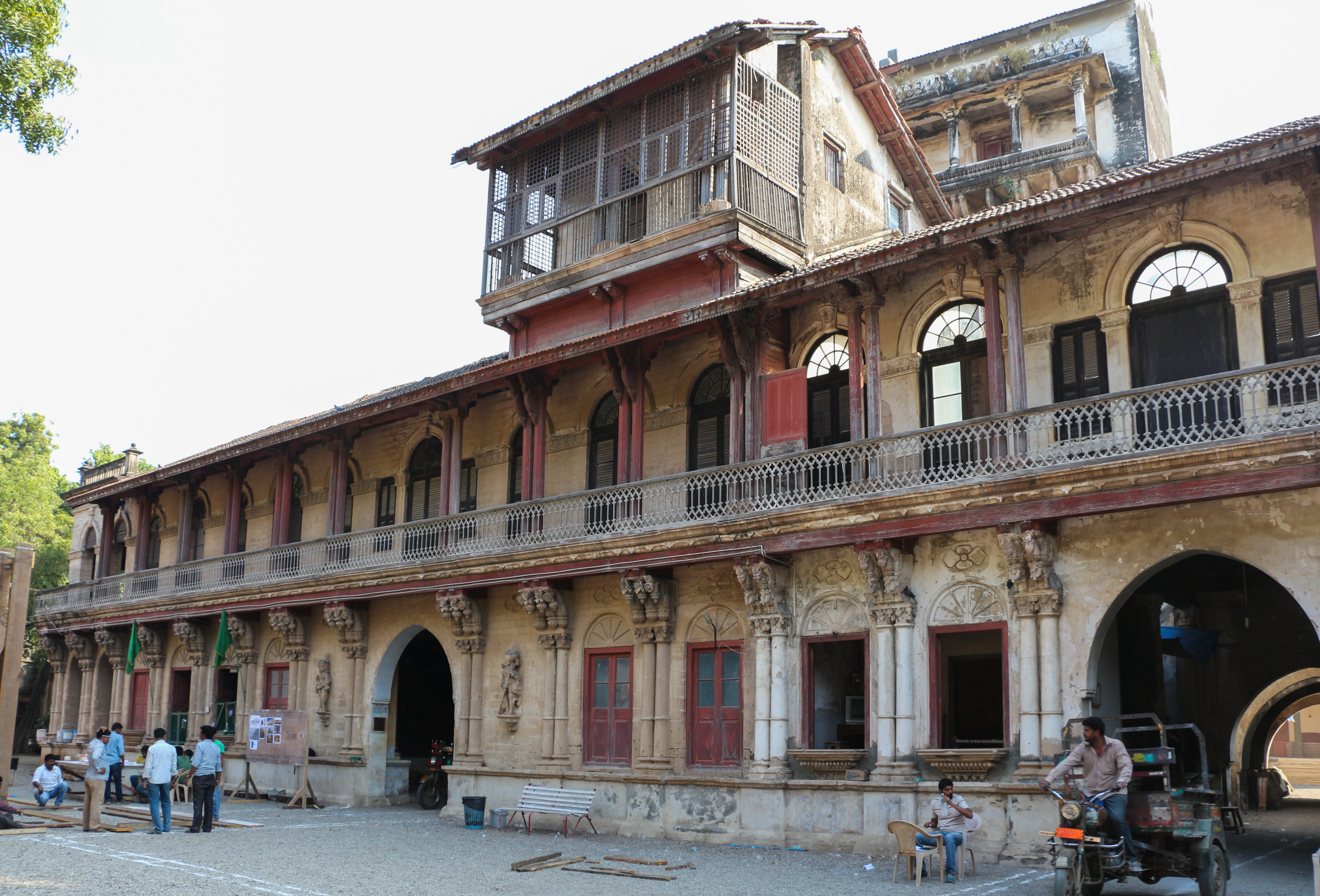
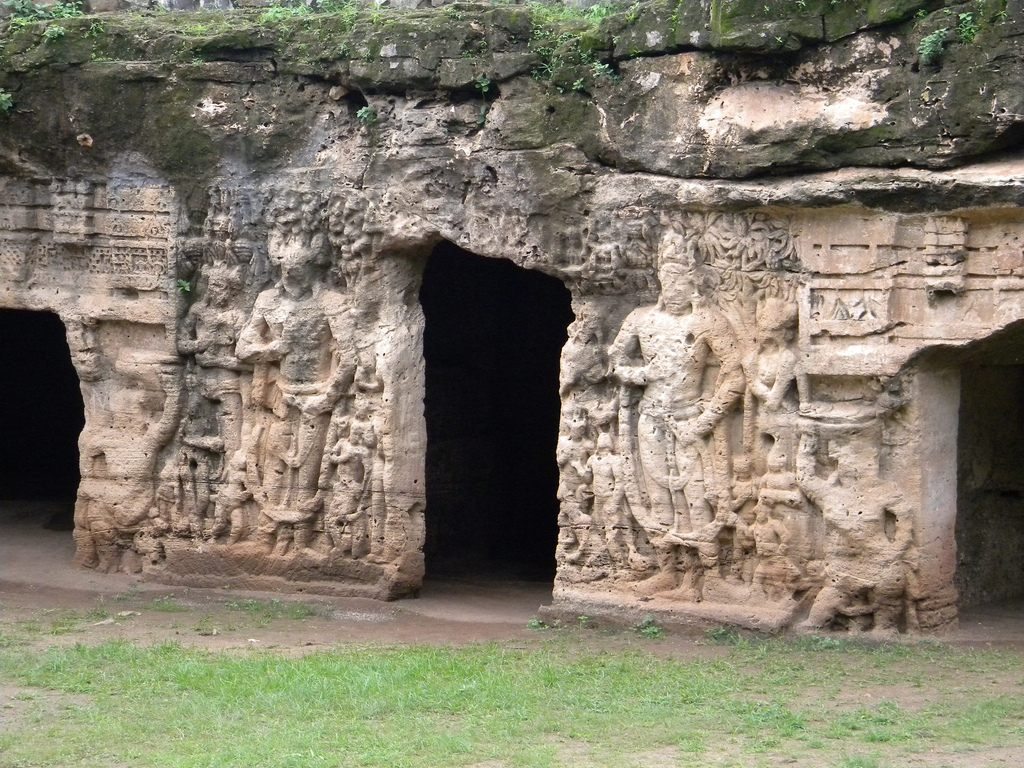
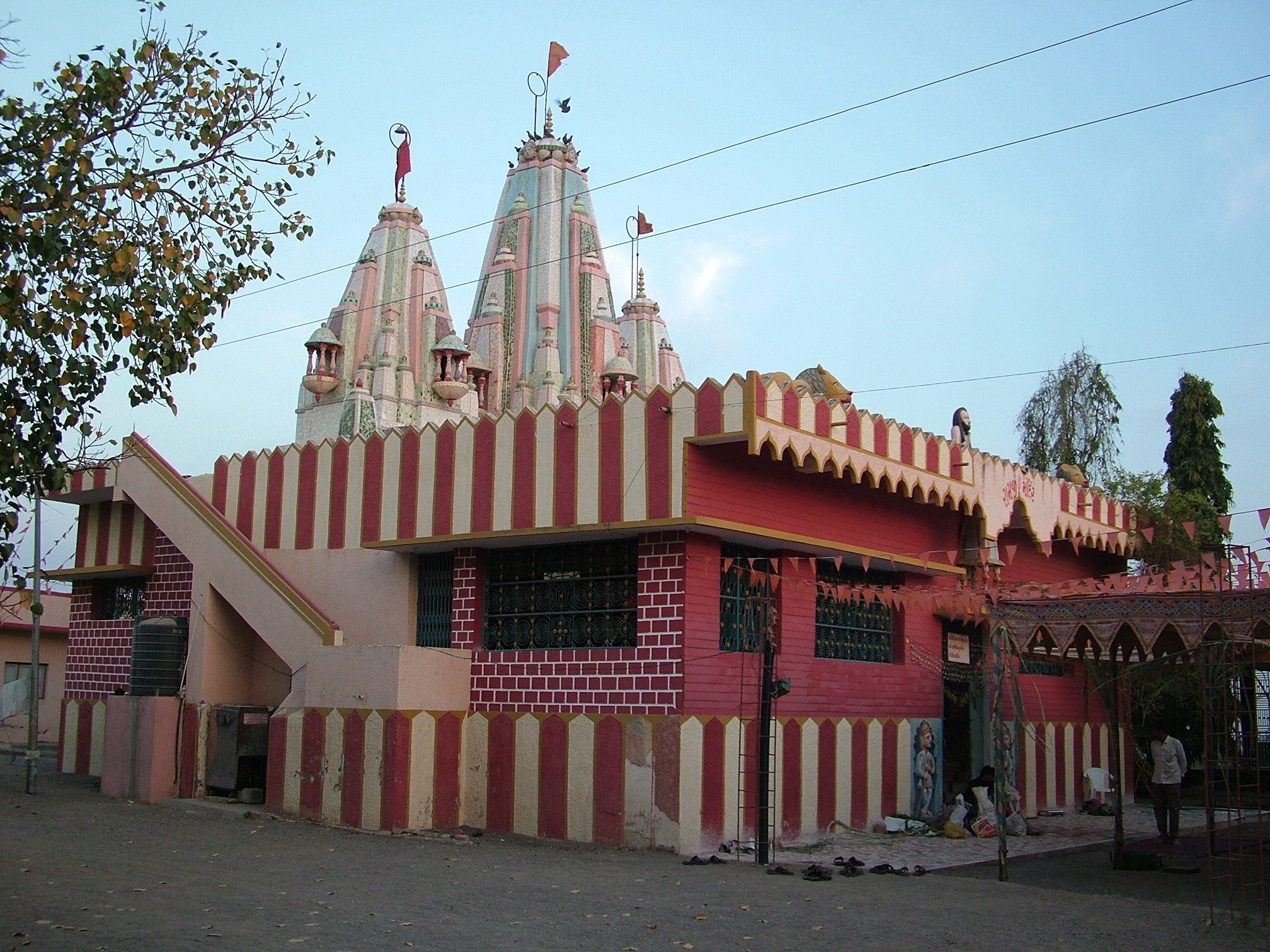
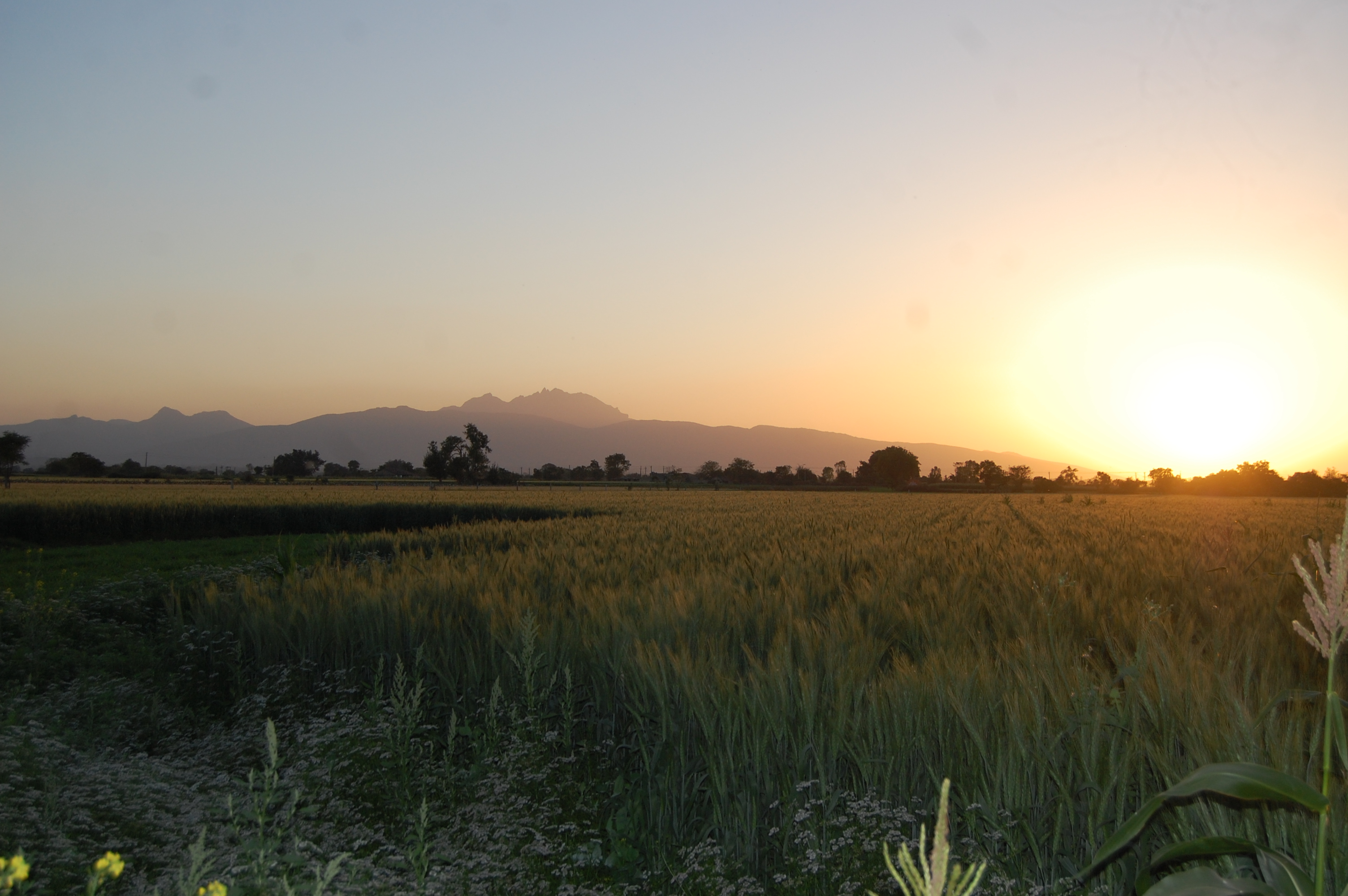
- Clockwise from top-left: Khodaldham Temple in Kagvad, Naulakha Palace in Gondal, Temple in Danidhar, View of Thorala village, Khambhalida Caves in Jetpur
- Interactive Map Outlining Rajkot District
- Location of district in Gujarat
- Coordinates: 22°18′N 70°47′E
- Country: India
- State: Gujarat
- Region: Saurashtra
- Established: 1620
- Named for: Raju Sandhi
- Headquarters: Rajkot

Area
  - Total: 11,203 km^{2} (4,326 sq mi)

Population (2011)
  - Total: 3,804,558
  - Rank: 67 of 640 in India; 4 of 26 in Gujarat
  - Density: 339.60/km^{2} (879.56/sq mi)

Languages
  - Official: Gujarati, Hindi, English
- Time zone: UTC+5:30 (IST)
- Vehicle registration: GJ 03
- Website: rajkot.nic.in

Rajkot district is one of the 34 districts of the Indian state of Gujarat. Located in Saurashtra peninsula, Rajkot city is the administrative headquarters of the district. It is the third-most advanced and the fourth-most populous district in Gujarat.

This district is surrounded by Morbi district in north, Surendranagar and Botad districts in east, Amreli and Junagadh districts in south and Porbandar and Jamnagar districts in west. The district occupies an area of 11203 km^{2}.

== Origin of name ==
The district is named after its headquarters, Rajkot city. The name of the city of Rajkot (literally means the city of princes) was probably derived from Raju Sandhi, the co-founder of the erstwhile princely state of Rajkot in 1620.

== Geography ==
The city is situated between 23°08' North latitude and 20º58' North latitude and 71º40' East longitude and 70º20' East longitude. Rajkot has a hot semi-arid climate (Köppen BSh) in common with all the Saurashtra peninsula. The summer spans from March to mid-June. The temperature at this time varies between 20 and 40 °C or 68 and 104 °F. The rainy season spans from mid-June to September. The average amount of rainfall received by the place is 550 millimetres or 22 inches although it is virtually entirely confined to the monsoon and shows extreme variability from year to year. The winter months are October to February.

Rajkot

Climate chart (precipitation, max. and min. temperature)
J	F	M	A	M	J	J	A	S	O	N	D
0 28 10	0 30 12	0 35 16	0 38 21	10 40 23	100 37 25	270 32 25	120 31 23	80 33 22	10 35 20	0 32 16	0 29 12
- █ Average max. and min. temperatures in °C
- █ Precipitation totals in mm
- Source: Weatherbase
Imperial conversion
J	F	M	A	M	J	J	A	S	O	N	D
0 82 50	0 86 54	0 95 61	0 100 70	0.4 104 73	3.9 99 77	11 90 77	4.7 88 73	3.1 91 72	0.4 95 68	0 90 61	0 84 54
- █ Average max. and min. temperatures in °F
- █ Precipitation totals in inches

== Divisions ==
The district comprises 14 talukas. These are Rajkot East, Rajkot West, Rajkot South, Rajkot Rural, Paddhari, Lodhika, Dhoraji, Jam Kandorna, Upleta, Jetpur, Kotda Sangani, Jasdan, Vinchhiya and Gondal. About 600 villages are in Rajkot District as per 2011 census data.

There are 8 Vidhan Sabha constituencies in this district: Rajkot East, Rajkot West, Rajkot South, Rajkot Rural, Jasdan, Gondal, Jetpur and Dhoraji.

Tankara, Wankaner, Rajkot East, Rajkot West, Rajkot South, Rajkot Rural and Jasdan constituencies are part of Rajkot Lok Sabha constituency. Gondal, Jetpur and Dhoraji are part of Porbandar Lok Sabha constituency. Morbi is part of Kachchh Lok Sabha constituency.

== Transport ==
Rajkot International Airport, located near Rajkot city provides air connectivity with Mumbai, Delhi, Bangalore, Hyderabad, Pune, Goa and Surat. The only port of this district was the Port of Navlakhi, an all-weather lighterage port located on the southwest end of the Gulf of Kutch, which now belongs to Morbi district that was introduced later.

The National Highway 8A links Morbi with Kandla. The National Highway 8B connects Rajkot with Porbandar. The National Highway 8D links Jetpur with Junagadh.

== Demographics ==
Historical population
Year	Pop.	±% p.a.
1901	500,686	—
1911	590,389	+1.66%
1921	586,561	−0.07%
1931	678,820	+1.47%
1941	799,863	+1.65%
1951	930,024	+1.52%
1961	1,208,519	+2.65%
1971	1,624,072	+3.00%
1981	2,093,094	+2.57%
1991	2,514,122	+1.85%
2001	3,169,881	+2.34%
2011	3,804,558	+1.84%

According to the 2011 census Rajkot district has a population of 3,804,558, roughly equal to the nation of Liberia or the US state of Oregon. This gives it a ranking of 68th in India (out of a total of 640). The district has a population density of 339 inhabitants per square kilometre (880/sq mi) . Its population growth rate over the decade 2001-2011 was 19.87%. Rajkot has a sex ratio of 924 females for every 1000 males, and a literacy rate of 82.2%.

After bifurcation the population was 3,015,229, of which 1,887,654 (62.60%) lived in urban areas. The divided district had a sex ratio of 923 females per 1000 males. Scheduled Castes and Scheduled Tribes were 235,749 (7.82%) and 19,160 (0.64%) of the population respectively.

Religions in Rajkot district (2011)
Religion	Percent
Hinduism	91.33%
Islam	7.38%
Jainism	0.94%
Other or not stated	0.35%

In the divided district Hindus were 2,753,712 (91.33%) while Muslims were 222,649 (7.38%) and Jains were 28,297 (0.94%).

Languages of Rajkot district (2011)
1. Gujarati (96.3%)
2. Hindi (1.95%)
3. Others (1.74%)

At the time of the 2011 Census of India, 96.31% of the population in the district spoke Gujarati and 1.95% Hindi as their first language.

It had a population of 3,169,881 of which 51.29% were urban as of 2001. The literacy rate is 74.85% (2001 census).

== Politics ==
District	No.	Constituency	Name	Party	Remarks
Rajkot	68	Rajkot East	Uday Kangad		
Rajkot	69	Rajkot West	Darshita Shah		
Rajkot	70	Rajkot South	Ramesh Tilala		
Rajkot	71	Rajkot Rural (SC)	Bhanuben Babariya	Cabinet Minister	
Rajkot	72	Jasdan	Kunwarjibhai Bavaliya	Cabinet Minister	
Rajkot	73	Gondal	Geetaba Jadeja		
Rajkot	74	Jetpur	Jayesh Radadiya		
Rajkot	75	Dhoraji	Mahendra Padalia		

== Notable personalities ==
- Dhumaketu (1892–1965) Writer. Born in Virpur.
- Mohandas Karamchand Gandhi: Born in Porbandar, Mahatma Gandhi grew up in Rajkot and maintained his permanent home in Rajkot for the majority of his life.
- Jalaram Bapa: Hindu saint. Born in Virpur.
- Shrimad Rajchandra: Spiritual mentor of Mahatma Gandhi, Famous Jain philosopher and thinker
- Cheteshwar Pujara: Indian National Cricketer.
- Karsan Ghavri: Indian National Cricketer.
- Pankaj Udhas: Notable Ghazal and Bollywood Singer.
- Manhar Udhas: Notable Ghazal and Bollywood Singer.
- Niranjan Shah: Former Secretary of the Board of Control for Cricket in India (BCCI)
- Vijay Rupani: Chief Minister of Gujarat
- Ramesh Mehta: Gujarati film comedian
- Hemu Gadhavi: Famous folk Singer
