= Asaphila =

Forested area along the China-India border

- Forest
- Location within Arunachal Pradesh Location within India Location within Tibet
- Coordinates: 28.43°N 93.17°E
- Country: India, Tibet region of China
- State/Prefecture: Arunachal Pradesh, Shannan Prefecture
- Subdivision: Upper Subansiri, Lhünzê County

Asaphila or Asafila (Note: Variations on the spelling include Ashafila, Asaphi La, Asa-Pila-Maya and Asapila.) is a mountainous forest area near the China–India border along the Subansiri River valley. It is at the southwestern corner of the Tsari region, straddling Lhünzê County in the Shannan Prefecture of Tibet, and the Taksing Circle in the Upper Subansiri district of Arunachal Pradesh, India. Occasional border disputes between the two countries in the region are reported.

== Description ==
According to former Indian Army chief V. P. Malik, Asaphila is a 100 km^{2} of densely forested mountainous area to the west of the town of Taksing in Arunachal Pradesh. It spans both sides of the Line of Actual Control in Tibet and India, including the valleys of Subansiri River (called Chayul Chu in Tibet) and Yume Chu. It is sparsely populated. Only foot tracks are available for movement in the area.

The nearest road link on the Indian side is at Taksing, for which the Indian Border Roads Organisation laid a road by 2018.

China has built a trunk road (Note: The trunk road is labelled as "G219" on OpenStreetMap. Evidently, it is separate from the China National Highway 219 in western Tibet.) which circles around the Tsari region, passing by the village of Lung in the Subansiri valley, and through Charme, Chösam and Migyitun. Link roads to Lung and Yume also exist, but they have not yet been extended up to the border with India.

== History ==
=== Sino-Indian War ===
During the 1962 Sino-Indian War, the Chinese attacked the Indian border posts in the area with a battalion of troops. A post in Asaphila, and others at Shagam La, Tama La and Potrang came under attack on 23 October 1962. The 2nd battalion of Jammu and Kashmir Rifles, which was deployed in the area, suffered 18 casualties included a JCO. As a result, on 26 October, the Indian headquarters ordered all the border posts from the Subansiri valley as well as the Tsari Chu valley to withdraw to Taliha.

After the war, the Chinese withdrew to their previous positions, except that they retained possession of the Longju area in the Tsari Chu valley.

=== Border incidents ===
Reports of PLA intrusions in the Asaphila area have been reported in 2003 and 2005. In 2003, a Chinese patrol disarmed an Indian non-military patrol in the area. In May 2012 thirty soldiers of the People's Liberation Army entered Asaphila and destroyed an Indian patrol hut. In 2014, Indian soldiers blocked Chinese road construction in the area. In 2018 China accused India of large scale transgressions into Asaphila.
