= Gelemo =

Village in Arunachal Pradesh, India

Coordinates: 28.4565°N 93.4620°E

Gelemo is located on the Tsari Chu between Bidak and Maja upstream and Gelensiniak downstream. Longju is in Indian territory according to Indian claims.

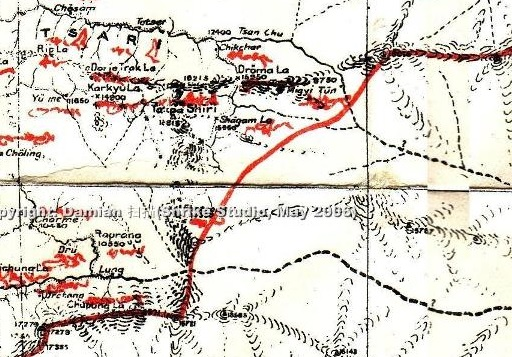
Taksing and Longju locate in nearby the McMahon Line

Gelemo or Gelomo (Note: The spelling used by the Indian Army is "Gelemo", whereas the census records use "Gelomo". The name is also spelt Galemo, Gilomo, and Gelong. Older documents possibly misspelt it as Gallen.) (full name: Gelomoring) is a border village in the Upper Subansiri district, Arunachal Pradesh, India. It is on the bank of the Tsari Chu river before its confluence with the Subansiri River, at a distance of "two days march" from the Indian claimed border at Longju. The present Line of Actual Control between China and India is at roughly half that distance.

== Location ==
Gelemo is in Limeking Circle of the Upper Subansiri district, one of the border areas adjoining the China–India border. The Tsari Chu river, called Gallen or Gelling by the Tagin people of the region, flows here from Migyitun in Tibet, traditionally considered a Tibetan border town. It joins the Subansiri River at Gelensiniak.

Gelemo is at an elevation of 1,790 metres (5,870 ft), at a distance of 17 kilometres (11 mi) from Gelensiniak. Upstream from Gelemo, 6 kilometres (3.7 mi) to the north, is the village of Bidak (also called Redding Camp). (Note: The Survey of India maps still use the name "Redding Camp". It is not to be confused with Redding, an entirely different village in the Taksing Circle.)

== History ==
An Indian expedition led by political officer S. M. Krishnatry in 1956 was told that Gelomo was the home of the Gibu-Gilo tribe of the Tagin people, but they were almost extinct with only one survivor left, who lived in Limeking. The location was controlled by the Mara tribe at that time, who used it as a hunting ground.

=== Tsari pilgrimage ===
Gelemo lies on the route of the 12-yearly Tsari pilgrimage of the Tibetans around the Dakpa Sheri mountain. The pilgrimage went down the Tsari Chu valley up to Gelensiniak and returned via the Subansiri valley, back into the Tibetan territory.

The last Tsari pilgrimage was conducted in 1956, after which the Sino-Indian border conflict put a stop to the relations between the two regions.

=== Sino-Indian border conflict ===
After the Longju incident in 1959, the Assam Rifles border troops stationed at Longju retreated to a place named "Gallen", which was most likely Gelemo. Afterwards, a new border post was established at Maja, (Note: Alternative spellings include Majha and Maza. The Tibetan name of the location appears to be Lungchung.) 3 miles south of Longju. During the 1962 Sino-Indian War, the Maja post was withdrawn, along with all other posts, since the Chinese attacked with an overwhelming force. The withdrawing forces were said to have been attacked from the rear near Reding (Bidak). The Chinese forces were in occupation of the entire area up to Limeking for the duration of the war.

After the war, China proposed that both the sides should withdraw 20 km from the Line of Actual Control. Even though India did not accept the condition, it appears to have set up a new border post further away, 10 kilometres (6.2 mi) south of Longju. The local people call this location New Maza and distinguish it from the original Maja village. The present Line of Actual Control is believed to run between the New Maja Post and the Chinese border post at Xingqiangpu Zhang.

In January 2021, news reports appeared stating that China had built a large 100-home civilian village near the original Maja village. The Chinese media have referred to it as "Lowa Xincun" (Chinese: 珞瓦新村; pinyin: Luò wǎ xīncūn). (Note: The name means literally, "new village for the people of Lo". "Lo" or "Loyul" was the original Tibetan name of the region, later referred to as "Tsari" on account of its sacredness. The Chinese seem to prefer the original name, e.g., by calling the Tsari Chu river "Lo He".)

== Demographics ==
Gelemo has a population of 40 people living in 11 households, as per the 2011 census. Bidak (Redding Camp) has a population of 39 people in 7 households.

== Facilities ==
Gelemo is being developed as a "model village" by the Government of Arunachal Pradesh. Solar street lights were installed in 2019. A potable water supply was installed in 2020. Irrigation canals, healthcare facilities, and a community hall are scheduled for construction.

In 2017, Indian Army set up Sawaiman (Note: The battalion which constructed it—17 Rajputana Rifles—were the forces of Sawai Man Singh II, prior to integration in the Indian Army.) Primary School in the Gelemo village.

== Transportation ==
There is a helipad at Gelemo, maintained by the Government of Arunachal Pradesh.

The Border Roads Organisation of India built a road link between Tame Chung Chung (near Gelensiniak) and Bidak in 2018. During its construction, Gelemo served as a construction base with all the construction equipment air lifted there in pieces and assembled locally. The road connectivity is still seen as being poor.

== Bibliography ==
- Upper Subansiri District Census Handbook, Part A (PDF), Directorate of Census Operations, Arunachal Pradesh, 2011
- Huber, Toni (1999), The Cult of Pure Crystal Mountain: Popular Pilgrimage and Visionary Landscape in Southeast Tibet, Oxford University Press, ISBN 978-0-19-535313-6
- Johri, Sitaram (1965), Chinese Invasion of NEFA, Himalaya Publications – via archive.org
- Kaul, B. M. (1967), The Untold Story, Allied Publishers – via archive.org
- Sinha, P.B.; Athale, A.A. (1992), History of the Conflict with China, 1962 (PDF), History Division, Ministry of Defence, Government of India
- Sandhu, P. J. S.; Shankar, Vinay; Dwivedi, G. G. (2015), 1962: A View from the Other Side of the Hill, Vij Books India Pvt Ltd, ISBN 978-93-84464-37-0
