= Gelensiniak =

- Village
- Location in Arunachal Pradesh, India Gelensiniak (India)
- Coordinates: 28.3722°N 93.4835°E
- Country: India
- State: Arunachal Pradesh
- District: Upper Subansiri
- Circle: Takking

Gelensiniak, (Note: The name has also been spelt as Gelenshiniak and Gelinceniak.) or Geling Sinyik, is a village in the Limeking Circle of the Upper Subansiri district in Arunachal Pradesh, India, close to the region's border with Tibet. The Gelen or Gelling river (called Tsari Chu in Tibet) flows down from Migyitun and Longju and joins the Subansiri River here. Gelensiniak is strategically located between Longju, Taksing and Limeking. The region is populated by the Mara clan of Tagin people. (Note: The original name is spelt "Mra". The Tibetans called them "Morang Lopa". The term "Marabai" was also used.)

Behind Gelensiniak, on a vertical cliff top is a flat area known as Tame Chung Chung ("place of snakes", abbreviated TCC), (Note: The name is also spelt Tama Chung Chung.) which hosts military camps for Indian border troops. Until road access to the Tame Chung Chung was built by the Border Roads Organisation in 2018, the camps were supplied only by helicopters. Distance of India-China Border Road constructed in 2018 from Gelensiniak (Tama Chung Chung) to Taksing is 80 km.

== Name ==
The name "Geling Sinyik" evidently denotes the confluence of the two rivers: Geling, i.e., the Tsari Chu river, and Sinik, i.e., the Subansiri River.

== History ==
Dakpa Sheri mountain and the locations marking the rongkor pilgrimage

=== Tsari pilgrimage ===
Gelensiniak lies on the route of the 12-yearly Tsari pilgrimage of the Tibetans around the Dakpa Sheri mountain. The pilgrimage went down the Tsari Chu valley up to Gelensiniak and returned via the Subansiri valley, back into the Tibetan territory.

The last Tsari pilgrimage was conducted in 1956, after which the Sino-Indian border conflict put a stop to the relations between the two regions.

=== Sino-Indian border conflict ===
After the 1959 Tibetan uprising, Chinese troops arrived in Tibet in large numbers and started militarising the border. The Indian border post at Longju, near Migyitun, was attacked and driven out. India withdrew the border post to Maja.

At the beginning of 1962, the Chinese activity along the border increased again. On 23 October, the war began with the Chinese troops attacking with superior force. The Asaphila post, manned by Jammu and Kashmir Rifles, lost one JCO and 17 other ranks. After this, all the Indian border posts were ordered to withdraw to Taliha. It is believed that the Chinese would have occupied all the vacated posts. On 16 November, two thousand Chinese troops were found in the Gelensiniak area equipped with heavy weaponry.

After the war, the Chinese withdrew to their previous positions, except that they retained possession of the Longju area in the Tsari Chu valley.

== Bibliography ==
- Upper Subansiri District Census Handbook, Part A (PDF), Directorate of Census Operations, Arunachal Pradesh, 2011
- Huber, Toni (1999), The Cult of Pure Crystal Mountain: Popular Pilgrimage and Visionary Landscape in Southeast Tibet, Oxford University Press, ISBN 978-0-19-535313-6
- Johri, Sitaram (1965), Chinese Invasion of NEFA, Himalaya Publications
- Krishnatry, S. M. (2005), Border Tagins of Arunachal Pradesh: Unarmed Expedition 1956, National Book Trust, ISBN 978-81-237-4460-5
- Sandhu, P. J. S.; Shankar, Vinay; Dwivedi, G. G. (2015), 1962: A View from the Other Side of the Hill, Vij Books India Pvt Ltd, ISBN 978-93-84464-37-0
- Sinha, P.B.; Athale, A.A.; Prasad, S. N. (1992), History of the Conflict with China, 1962 (PDF), History Division, Ministry of Defence, Government of India
