= Taksing =

- Village
- Location in Arunachal Pradesh, India Taksing (India)
- Coordinates: 28.4347°N 93.2039°E
- Country: India
- State: Arunachal Pradesh
- District: Upper Subansiri
- Circle: Taksing

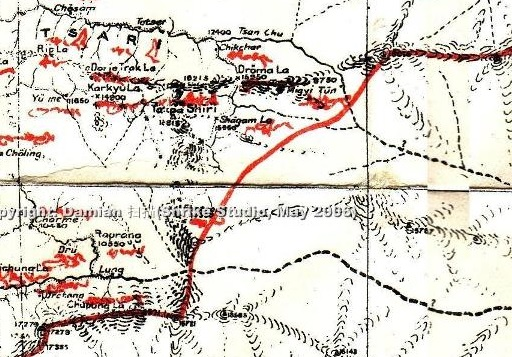
Taksing is located nearby to the McMahon Line

Taksing (Note: The name has also been spelt as Takshing, Taksiang, and Takaing. It is not to be confused with Taying, which is a separate village nearby.) is a village and headquarters of an eponymous Circle in the Upper Subansiri district, Arunachal Pradesh, India. The region of Taksing is populated by Tagin people.

The village is on the bank of the Subansiri River, shortly after the river from China enters India from the west. Road access to the village from Limeking was provided by the Border Roads Organisation in 2018. Taksing is on the eastern edge of the Asaphila area.

== Description ==
Taksing and vicinity. The main Tsari pilgrimage route was diamond-shaped, going through Chosam, Migyitun, Gelensiniak, and Taksing, back to Chosam.

Taksing is on the southern bank of the Subansiri River soon after it enters India from the west.

There has been a traditional walking track on the southern bank of the river between Gelensiniak and Taksing. The track continues west for about 3 km till the village of Ishneya, and crosses the Subansiri River to its northern bank. This being close to the confluence of Yume Chu and Subansiri rivers, tracks from Lung (in the Subansiri valley) and Yume (in the Yume Chu valley) in Tibet join here. India's Border Roads Organisation (BRO) has constructed a road between Gelensiniak and Taksing between 2009 and 2018.

The southern bank of the Subansiri River is well-populated with over a dozen villages belonging to the Taksing Circle. There are also a few villages to the north of the Subansiri River. The Taksing Circle had a population of 733 people per the 2011 census. (Note: The Census of India mentions 12 villages in the Taksing Circle: Dadu, Dojubung, Gumsing, Ishneya (Isnia), Kacha, Lingbing, Ojugu, Redding, Reddy (Redy), Taying, Thungba and Yaja. According to the map of the Chief Electoral Officer of Arunachal Pradesh, the Kacha village is to the north of the Subansiri Valley, perhaps on the Pindigo river, along with four other villages: Toyingmuri, Jimbari, Papi and Mosu.)

The population consists of Na people (or Nga people) who speak their own Na language. They are said to be similar to the Tagin people populating the neighbouring Limeking Circle.

== History ==
=== Tsari pilgrimage ===
Taksing lies in a holy ground for the Tibetans, lying on the route of the 12-yearly Tsari pilgrimage around the Dakpa Sheri mountain. The pilgrimage went down the Tsari Chu valley up to Gelensiniak and returned via the Subansiri valley, back into the Tibetan territory. Taksing was mentioned by name in the Tibetan sources, the only one in the tribal territory to be so mentioned. Taksing itself was a sacred site that the Tibetans believed to be a tantric charnel ground named Ngampa Tratrok, where certain Drukpa lamas had meditated in the past. Taksing was marked by a huge tree where the chief Tsari field-protector was believed to dwell.

After passing Taksing, the procession reached the Doring rest house on a spur above the Char river, where Charlo tribesmen brought popped corn to the famished pilgrims.

The last Tsari pilgrimage was conducted in 1956, after which the Sino-Indian border conflict put a stop to the relations between the two regions.

=== Sino-Indian border conflict ===
After the 1959 Tibetan uprising, Chinese troops arrived in Tibet in large numbers and started militarising the border. The Indian border post at Longju, near Migyitun, was attacked and driven out. India withdrew the border post to Maja.

At the beginning of 1962, the Chinese activity along the border increased again. India strengthened its border post at Taksing by a platoon. In June, a dozen tribesmen from Lengbeng (Lingbing) village stole some arms from the Taksing post, allegedly under Chinese persuasion. They were intercepted and a tribesman was killed in the ensuing clash. On 23 October, the war began with the Chinese troops attacking with superior force. The Asaphila post, manned by Jammu and Kashmir Rifles, lost one JCO and 17 other ranks. After this, all the Indian border posts were ordered to withdraw to Taliha. It is believed that the Chinese would have occupied all the vacated posts. On 16 November, two thousand Chinese troops were found in the Gelensiniak area equipped with heavy weaponry.

After the war, the Chinese withdrew to their previous positions, except that they retained possession of the Longju area in the Tsari Chu valley.

== Transportation ==
India's Border Roads Organisation (BRO) has constructed a road between Gelensiniak and Taksing between 2009 and 2018. It connects Taksing to existing Gelensiniak-Limeking-Taliha-Daporijo road. All the road-building equipment was shipped, piece by piece, by helicopters and reassembled at the location. In addition, the construction teams had to battle rains, dense forests, rugged and steep mountains, landslides and resistance from the local tribes who claim ancestral ownership of the mountains. It was reported that the road was in bad condition in 2020.

Another strategic road was constructed by BRO in 2017 in Kurung Kumey district between Huri (which is already connected to Koloriang) and Sarli after heavy construction equipment was heli-airlifted from Ziro, which will enable Koloriang-Huri-Sarli-Taliha-Daporijo connectivity by facilitating the construction of the remaining Sarli-Taliha section. Once Taliha-Daporijo, Taliha-Nacho, Taliha-Tato (headquarter of Shi Yomi district are completed, all of which were under construction in February 2021 while facing land acquisition issues, it will provide the strategic frontier connectivity from Seppa-Tamsang Yangfo-Sarili-Koloriang-Sarili-Nacho (and beyond to Daporijo-Taksing)-Tato (and beyond to Mechuka-Gelling and Aalo).

== Bibliography ==
- Upper Subansiri District Census Handbook, Part A (PDF), Directorate of Census Operations, Arunachal Pradesh, 2011
- Huber, Toni (1999), The Cult of Pure Crystal Mountain: Popular Pilgrimage and Visionary Landscape in Southeast Tibet, Oxford University Press, ISBN 978-0-19-535313-6
- Johri, Sitaram (1965), Chinese Invasion of NEFA, Himalaya Publications
- Krishnatry, S. M. (2005), Border Tagins of Arunachal Pradesh: Unarmed Expedition 1956, National Book Trust, ISBN 978-81-237-4460-5
- Sandhu, P. J. S.; Shankar, Vinay; Dwivedi, G. G. (2015), 1962: A View from the Other Side of the Hill, Vij Books India Pvt Ltd, ISBN 978-93-84464-37-0
- Sinha, P.B.; Athale, A.A.; Prasad, S. N. (1992), History of the Conflict with China, 1962 (PDF), History Division, Ministry of Defence, Government of India
