= Mara (Tagin) =

Tribe of Arunachal Pradesh

Mara Tagin
Regions with significant populations
- India (Arunachal Pradesh)

Languages
- Tani

Religion
- Donyi-Polo (sun and moon), Hinduism, Christianity

Mara or Mra (also known as Mura) refers to a tribe in Arunachal Pradesh. The Mara (Mra) inhabit in Limeking in Upper Subansiri, just south of Taksing which is inhabited by the Nga (or Na). Like other Tagins, the Mara subscribe to the Donyi Polo faith but have come under considerable Tibetan Buddhist influence as a result of centuries of interactions with the Tibetans in the north.

Like the Nga, the Mara also engage in barter trade with the Tibetans in the north prior to the closure of the Indo-Tibetan border in view of the 1962 Sino-Indian War. They traded ornaments, Tibetan dao from the Tibetans in the north and Mithun, tribal masks, animal hides and dyes of plants from the Nishi and Sulung on the south.

== Origin ==
The Mara are ethnically Tagin (Na people) although they claim to be a separate group, just like the Nga to the north, but they acknowledge a common ancestry.

But the Mara believed that they were descended from two brothers, Kangra and Mara, who came from Nyime (Tibet) and settled in the region.
