= Si-Donyi Festival =

Si-Donyi is the major festival celebrated among the Tagin tribe residing in upper subansiri district of Arunachal Pradesh in North-eastern India. It is celebrated majorly in district headquarter Daporijo, in adjoining town Dumporijo and in Taliha, Siyum areas, also in state capital Itanagar, while in other places also it's being celebrated by Tagin community present there. The festival was first conceptualised in the year 1975 by Late Tatar Uli, who was the main pioneer in inception of Si-Donyi uyu. The other members who bore the responsibilities were Late Tadak Dulom and Popak Bage. The festival was celebrated in the same year under their guidance, and since then, the festival Si-donyi uyu has been celebrated by the Tagin tribe. The first priest who led the ritual was Dubi Nogam. Further the name Si-Donyi was suggested by Shri. Bingsa Kodak.

Recent developments of the Si-Donyi Festival is that Word 'Hilo' is added to the existed name of the Festival i.e Si-Donyi Hilo. That leading wide controversy among the Tagin tribe of Arunachal Pradesh. Some people of the tribe are opposing the naming Modified version of the Festival. They believe that when Hilo is chanted, individual family/ or clan sacrifice Mithun(Buffalo)to king of the Evil Spirit. And they believe that Si(Earth) and Donyi(Sun) are the Goddess and God of the people and so both Si-Donyi and Hillo have huge different with each other. So they celebrate Si-Donyi is the form of Festival since year 1975. They also strongly emotionally attach with the original founder members of the Festival and believe that history of the Festival may dilute due to renaming. On the other hand TSC (Tagin Cultural Society) and some members of Organizing committee of 2024 Si-Donyi Festival thought that suffixing Hilo word is necessary for the Si-Donyi Festival i.e Si-Donyi Hilo Festival. They believe that Hilo is local language of Festival. Also some of they believed that Hilo means Chief (above all).

Controversial is still going on and first group is planning to celebrate the Festival by name of the existing one separately 2024 Si-Donyi onward.

== Duration ==
It is celebrated from the 4 to 6 January every year. During the festival god Si (Atu Si-male spiritual form of earth) and goddess Donyi (Ayu Donyi-female spiritual form of Sun) is being venerated in their spiritual form.

== Rituals ==
Nibu or the local priest presides over the festival by chanting UI (a form of verbal prayers) to the deities, Si and Donyi in particular. For the prosperity of entire community, to stop malevolent spirits from creating destruction towards the people of community and to ask permission for quality crops and health.

Sehtu A platform constructed of bamboos and wood, decorated with required leaves and bamboo stuffs (Nyûgé). The entire hymns and chanting and ghayal sacrifice is done around here.

Another key component is dancing; dances such as Chungne, Konyi Bokar, Riabu, and Takar Ghene are performed by the groups of men and women in their traditional attires and ornaments. While older male perform Hoyi Penam which is a specially performed to welcome the spirits.

While essentially Etțě, a paste made of rice beer and rice powder is smeared on peoples' faces in celebration.

The Mithun gayal is sacrificed for the deities marking the end of festival, while celebration continues for weeks.

== Etymology ==
It is celebrated to venerate the Si (the Earth) and the Donyi (the Sun), the chief deities among the Donyi-Poloism followed by the Tagin. The male spirit form of the Si god and the female spirit form of the Donyi goddess are worshipped.
