= Koloriang =

- Location within Arunachal Pradesh Location within India
- Coordinates: 27°55′N 93°21′E
- Country: India
- State: Arunachal Pradesh
- District: Kurung Kumey
- Elevation: 1,000 m (3,300 ft)

Population (2011)
  - Total: 24,300

Koloriang is a hilly district headquarters town of Kurung Kumey district in Arunachal Pradesh, India, bordering Tibet. It has an altitude of 1,000 metres (3,300 ft), is surrounded by high mountains and is located in the left bank of river Kurung, one of the major tributaries of Subansiri river. The climate is rainy and hot during summer and very cold in winter. Located at an altitude of 1,040 metres above sea level, this town is also an old administrative centre. It is about 257 km from state capital, Itanagar.

== Etymology ==
This town has derived its name from two words, Kolo is believed to be the name of the owner of the area and Riang meaning land.

== Climate ==
The temperature during spring and winter ranges between 20 and 30 °C. The locals are asserting Koloriang's recognition as the wettest place on earth. It will not only make the area famous the world over but will also attract tourists.

== Culture ==
The Bengia, Chera, Nangram, Chello, Riya, Yumlam, Gida, Gichik, Kiogi, Bamang, Kipa, Tadar, Gyamar, Tarh, Phassang, Tai, Lokam, Sangha, Tamchi, Pisa, clans of Nyishi community inhabits the area.

Longte is the annual festival of the area where people enjoy with festivity and pray different gods and goddesses for protection and well being of humanity, livestock and general prosperity. It is celebrated in the month of April every year. Nyokum is also celebrated with greater festive and joy, Mithuns are sacrificed for good life and generous to their lord, where Nyub, local priest chants the local prayer where he trades the offerings with positive success and enlightenment in life and for bumper production of agricultural goods.

== Geography ==
At present, the destination sprawls over a land area of 5,39,672.50 square metres. Nikja, Yapak, Tayang, Nyollo, and Pinggang,( Taipa), are the nearby villages.

== Politics ==
The name of the current MLA of this constituency is Lokam Tasar.

== Tourism ==
Known for its natural environment, the town is visited by those interested in nature walks and trekking. On the way to Koloriang from Ziro, there are a number of picnic spots. Tourists visiting the town also head towards nearby villages such as Sangram, Palin, Deed and Talo. As common population calls koloriang Mini India it is proven when the Town is seen from the Above (Air).

== Transport ==
The nearest airport serving the area is Naharlagun Airport, which is located in Naharlagun. People travelling from international destinations board flights to Lokpriya Gopinath Bordoloi International Airport in Guwahati, which has connecting flights to Lilabari Airport in Assam, located close to Koloriang. Apst (Arunachal Pradesh State Transport) service is available from Itanagar via Naharlagun in alternative days.

It is on the NH13 which is part of larger Trans-Arunachal Highway. A strategic road was constructed by BRO in 2017 in Kurung Kumey district between Huri (which is already connected to Koloriang) and Sarli after heavy construction equipment was heli-airlifted from Ziro, which will enable Koloriang-Huri-Sarli-Taliha-Daporijo connectivity by facilitating the construction of the remaining Sarli-Taliha section. Once Taliha-Daporijo, Taliha-Nacho, Taliha-Tato (head quarter of Shi Yomi district are completed, all of which were under construction in February 2021 while facing land acquisition issues, it will provide the strategic frontier connectivity from Seppa-Tamsang Yangfo-Sarili-Koloriang-Sarili-Nacho(and beyond to Daporijo-Taksing)-Tato(and beyond to Mechuka-Gelling and Aalo).

== See also ==
- List of districts of Arunachal Pradesh
