= Sangnag Chöling =

Coordinates: 28.5594°N 92.8234°E

Sangnag Chöling (Tibetan: གསང་སྔགས་ཆོས་གླིང་, Wylie: gsang sngags chos gling, Chinese: 三安曲林乡; pinyin: sānānqūlín xiāng), is a township in Lhünzê County in the Tibet Autonomous Region of China. It lies northwest of Yümai in the Char Chu rivervalley. It contains a historic Buddhist monastery.

== See also ==
- List of towns and villages in Tibet

== Bibliography ==
- Huber, Toni (1992), "A Tibetan Map of lHo-kha in the South-Eastern Himalayan Borderlands of Tibet", Imago Mundi, 44: 2+9–23, doi:10.1080/03085699208592738, JSTOR 1151225
- Huber, Toni (1999), The Cult of Pure Crystal Mountain: Popular Pilgrimage and Visionary Landscape in Southeast Tibet, Oxford University Press, ISBN 978-0-19-535313-6
