= Miri people =

Miri people may refer to two ethnic groups of India:

- Mising people in Assam and Arunachal Pradesh, also known as Plains Miri
- Hill Miri people in Arunachal Pradesh
