= Ringba-Roba Wildlife Sanctuary =

Protected area in Arunachal Pradesh, India

- IUCN category IV (habitat/species management area)
- Location within Arunachal Pradesh Location within India
- Interactive map of Ringba-Roba Wildlife Sanctuary
- Nearest city: Seppa
- Coordinates: 28°9′39″N 93°53′00″E
- Area: 49.2 km^{2} (19.0 sq mi)
- Established: 22 October 2015

Ringba-Roba Wildlife Sanctuary is a protected area and wildlife sanctuary located in East Kameng district of the Indian state of Arunachal Pradesh. The sanctuary covers an area of 49.2 km^{2} (19.0 sq mi) and was declared as a protected area on 22 October 2015.

The protected area consists of a mixture of tropical, temperate and alpine forests. Fauna found in the sanctuary include Bengal tiger, Himalayan black bear, clouded leopard, spotted deer, Indian civet, wild boar, capped langur, and antelopes.
