= Nacho, Arunachal Pradesh =

Coordinates: 28.395°N 93.838°E

Nacho is a village in Upper Subansiri district in the Indian state of Arunachal Pradesh.

Nacho is represented in the Arunachal Pradesh Legislative Assembly by Nacho (Vidhan Sabha constituency). The current MLA, as of 2019, is Nakap Nalo.

Nacho is located 65 km north of the district headquarters, Daporijo.

A strategic road was constructed by BRO in 2017 in Kurung Kumey district between Huri (which is already connected to Koloriang) and Sarli after heavy construction equipment was heli-airlifted from Ziro, which will enable Koloriang-Huri-Sarli-Taliha-Daporijo connectivity by facilitating the construction of the remaining Sarli-Taliha section.

Once Taliha-Daporijo, Taliha-Nacho, Taliha-Tato (headquarter of Shi Yomi district are completed, all of which were under construction in February 2021 while facing land acquisition issues, it will provide the strategic frontier connectivity from Seppa-Tamsang Yangfo-Sarili-Koloriang-Sarili-Nacho (and beyond to Daporijo-Taksing)-Tato (and beyond to Mechuka-Gelling and Aalo).

== See also ==
- List of constituencies of Arunachal Pradesh Legislative Assembly
- Arunachal Pradesh Legislative Assembly
