= Na people =

Tribal group in Arunachal Pradesh, India

Nah people
Total population
- 1,500 (2000 census)

Regions with significant populations
- India (Arunachal Pradesh)

Languages
- Na dialect

Religion
- Donyi-Polo (sun and moon), Gelug, Christianity

The Nah people are a small Sub-tribe of the Tagin residing in the Taksing area of Nacho circle under the Upper Subansiri District,Arunachal Pradesh. They speak the Na dialect, a member of the Sino-Tibetan language family, in which the population's literacy rate is 30%. The Na language is Classified under the Tagin language. They also use Hindi or English. As of 2000, the tribal population stood at 1,500.

== History ==
The Nah were believed to have migrated South from the north in Tibet following racial persecution from the Tibetans, but later engaged in trade with the Tibetans after the Nishi served as a mediator between the two groups until recent times. However, relations with their neighbors were often unstable; for instance, the shift of preference of their northern Tibetan trading partners in a 1906 incident resulted in a massacre which claimed many lives from their tribal group.

The Nah are adherents of Tibetan Buddhism but are also influenced by pre-Buddhist Shaman practices. Both Buddhist Lamas and traditional Shamans, known as Nyibu in the native tongue, are employed for religious occasions.

Like most tribes living in higher elevations, they build permanent houses made of stone and cultivate the usable land. One can see villages with terraced fields growing maize, millet, barley, etc. They breed domestic animals including yaks and sheep, and their clothes are made of spun wool.

== Origin ==
The Nah are more closely related to the Tagin both ethnically and linguistically than to Tibetans, but they claim to be a separate group, like the Mara who live in Limeking. However, both tribes acknowledge that they share a common ancestry with the Tagin.

In all official censuses, the Naga are classified together with the Tagin, who are ethnically related to them.

== Distributions ==
They are found mainly in the Upper Subansiri district in villages within Taksing circle: Gumsing, Taying, Esnaya, Lingbing, Tongba, Yeja, Reding, Redi, Dadu villages.
