= Yume, Tibet =

Yume ཡུལ་སྨད་
- Yümai
- Location within Tibet Autonomous Region
- Coordinates: 28.6332°N 93.0731°E
- Country: China
- Region: Tibet
- Prefecture: Shannan Prefecture
- County: Lhünzê County

Area
  - Total: 450 km^{2} (170 sq mi)

Population (2017)
  - Total: 32
  - Major Nationalities: Tibetan
  - Regional dialect: Tibetan language
- Time zone: +8

Yume or Yümé, also spelt Yümai (Tibetan: ཡུལ་སྨད་, Wylie: yul smad, THL: yül mé), is a township in the Lhuntse County in Tibet region of China. Yume is on the bank of the Yume Chu river, a tributary of the Subansiri River, which it joins the China–India border close to Taksing. The township is part of the Tsari district, considered holy by Tibetans.

== Location and significance ==
Dakpa Sheri mountain and the locations marking the rongkor pilgrimage

Yume is on the bank of Yume Chu river, a short tributary of the Subansiri River, which it joins near Tibet's border with India's Arunachal Pradesh. Yume is in the western section of the Buddhist holy ground of Tsari centred at the Dakpa Sheri mountain.

The 12-yearly rongkor (ravine circuit) pilgrimage around the Tsari mountain passed through Yume, after passing through Migyitun, Gelensiniak and Taksing, to finish at Chösam. The last rongkor pilgrimage was held in 1956, after which the Sino-Indian border conflict put a stop to the practice. Tibetologist Claude Arpi has called for India and China to cooperate to bring about a resumption of the pilgrimage.

== Development ==
Yume is in a wet Himalayan border region uncharacteristic of the dry Tibetan plateau. With the shutting down of the Tsari pilgrimage, the population of Yume seems to have dwindled. In 2011, it was reported that Yume had only nine households, and described as China's smallest township.

China has funded development of the region by building roads, mobile telephone networks, a power grid and a medical centre. Its current population is said to be 300, probably including Chinese staff and settlers.

== Transportation ==
Yume Highway connects the town of Chösam with Yume, and runs almost till the end of the township, barring the uncertain China-India border region. Chösam is on China National Highway 219, connecting to other major towns of the region such as Migyitun, Sangnag Chöling, Charme, Doyul, Lung and Chayul.

== See also ==
- List of towns and villages in Tibet

== Bibliography ==
- Huber, Toni (1992), "A Tibetan Map of lHo-kha in the South-Eastern Himalayan Borderlands of Tibet", Imago Mundi, 44: 2+9–23, doi:10.1080/03085699208592738, JSTOR 1151225
- Huber, Toni (1999), The Cult of Pure Crystal Mountain: Popular Pilgrimage and Visionary Landscape in Southeast Tibet, Oxford University Press, ISBN 978-0-19-535313-6
