= Lhünzê Town =

Town in Lhünzê County, Shannan, Tibet, China

Lhünzê 隆子镇 ལྷུན་རྩེ་
- Town
- Interactive map of Lhünzê
- Coordinates: 28°24′30″N 92°27′43″E

Area
  - Total: 10,049.70 km^{2} (3,880.21 sq mi)

Population (2022)
  - Total: 8,371
- Time zone: UTC+8 (CT)
- Postal code: 856600
- Area code: +86

Lhünzê (ལྷུན་རྩེ་, 隆子镇) is a town and township and seat of Lhünzê County in the Tibet Autonomous Region of China. With a population of 37,236 as of 2024.

== See also ==
- List of populated places in the Tibet Autonomous Region
