= Kora (pilgrimage) =

Element in Tibetan Buddhism

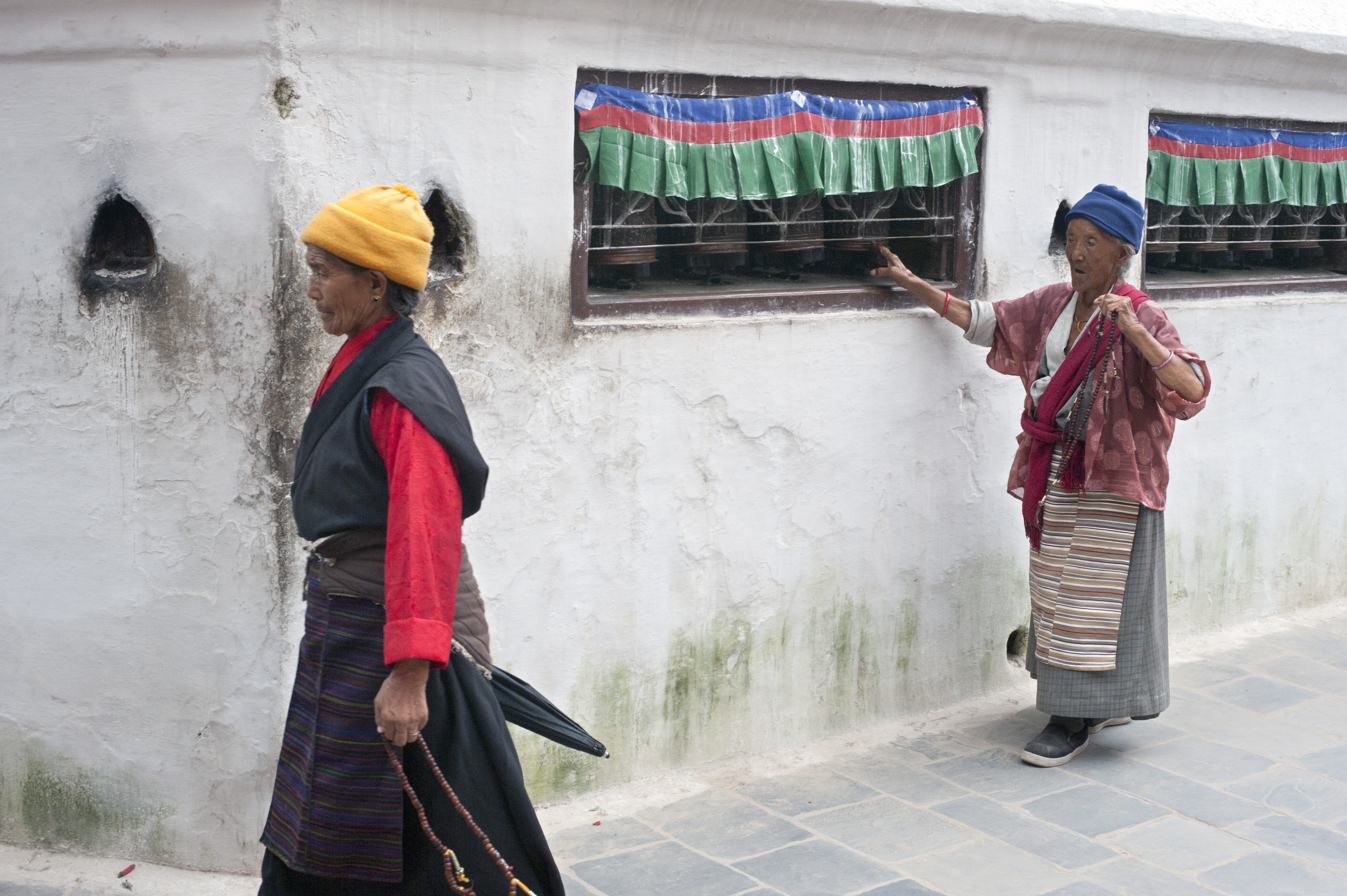
Kora at Boudhanath stupa, Kathmandu, Nepal. One woman is spinning prayer wheels and both are holding/counting malas.

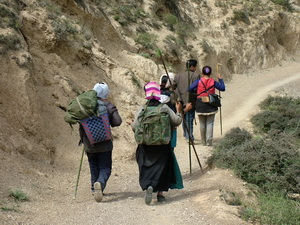
Pilgrims on the Kawa Karpo Kora circuit, an arduous 240 km (150 mi) 12-stage trek across six high passes of up to 4,800 meters (15,800 feet)

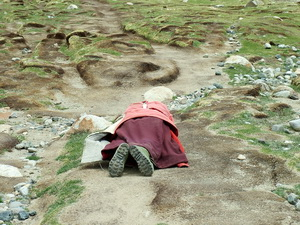
A pilgrim circumambulating Mt. Kailash by performing full body prostrations

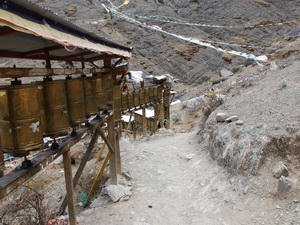
Kora circuit around Tashilhunpo monastery in Shigatse, Tibet

Kora (Tibetan: སྐོར་ར, Wylie: skor ra, THL Simplified Phonetic Transcription: kor ra) is a transliteration of a Tibetan word that means "circumambulation" or "revolution". Kora is both a type of pilgrimage and a type of meditative practice in the Tibetan Buddhist or Bon traditions. A Kora is performed by the practitioner making a circumambulation around a sacred site or object, typically as a constituent part of a pilgrimage, ceremony, celebration or ritual. In broader terms, it is a term that is often used to refer to the entire pilgrimage experience in the Tibetan regions.

== Classification and foci ==
For "pilgrimage", Tibetans generally use the term nékor (Tibetan: གནས་སྐོར, Wylie: gnas skor), "circling around an abode" (Tibetan: གནས, Wylie: gnas, THL: né), referring to the general practice of circumambulation as a way of relating to such places. In the context of kora, the né or néchen (Tibetan: གནས་ཆེན, Wylie: gnas chen) is rendered as "empowered", "sacred" or "holy" place/object, and the né is credited with the ability to transform those that circumambulate it. Aspects of both the natural and the man-made world are also considered to be the né of a wide variety of nonhuman beings such as iṣṭadevatās or ḍākinīs. (Note: Kailash, Lapchi, Tsari are all regarded as né of Khorlo Demchok (Chakrasamvara), with Mount Kailash described as the né of his body, Lapchi as the né of his speech and Tsari as the né of his mind. These same places are also regarded as the né of various ḍākinīs, e.g., the White Lion-Faced, Striped Tiger-Faced and Black Sow-Faced ḍākinīs of Kailash, Lapchi and Tsari respectively. Kawa Karpo is regarded by the people of Kham as the easternmost né of Chakrasamvara.)

Né generally fall into the following four types:

- Natural sites. The most momentous né are the great sacred mountains (Note: Some mountain peaks are classified as néri, a term that can be translated literally as "mountain abode. The term neri is sometimes incorporated into the full proper names of such category of mountains. Although many mountains in Tibet are considered to have resident deities, most peaks are not classified as neri. As examples, Kawa Karpo is often called Neri Kawa Karpo and Dakpa Shelri "Pure Crystal Mountain" at Tsari is often referred to as Ne Dakpa Shelri.) and lakes. They cover large areas, sometimes hundreds of square kilometers. Within these areas the points of power may include: peaks, rocks, caves, springs, confluences and sky-burial sites. Kora associated with these natural sites can be arduous treks of long distances, crossing a number of high passes and through difficult terrain.

In the Tibetan region, some traditional kora sites important to the region include: the sacred mountains of Mount Kailash (or Gang Rinpoche or Mt. Tise), Lapchi, (Note: Although Lapchi had been a historically coherent part of Tibet, as a result of the China-Nepal Boundary Treaty of 1961, the Lapchi area now lies mostly in Nepal just on the Nepal-Tibet border.) Tsari and Kawa Karpo; (Note: Historically, Kawa Karpo was located inside the Kham region which was, in turn, a historically coherent part of Tibet. It now lies on the political border of Yunnan Province and Tibet in China) Lake Manasarovar, Yamdrok and Namtso.

- Man-made sites, including cities, monasteries, temples, stupas, hermitages, etc.

For example, in Nepal, kora are commonly performed around Swayambhunath and Boudhanath, two important stupas in the Kathmandu Valley; in Tibet, around the Potala Palace or the Jokhang in Lhasa.

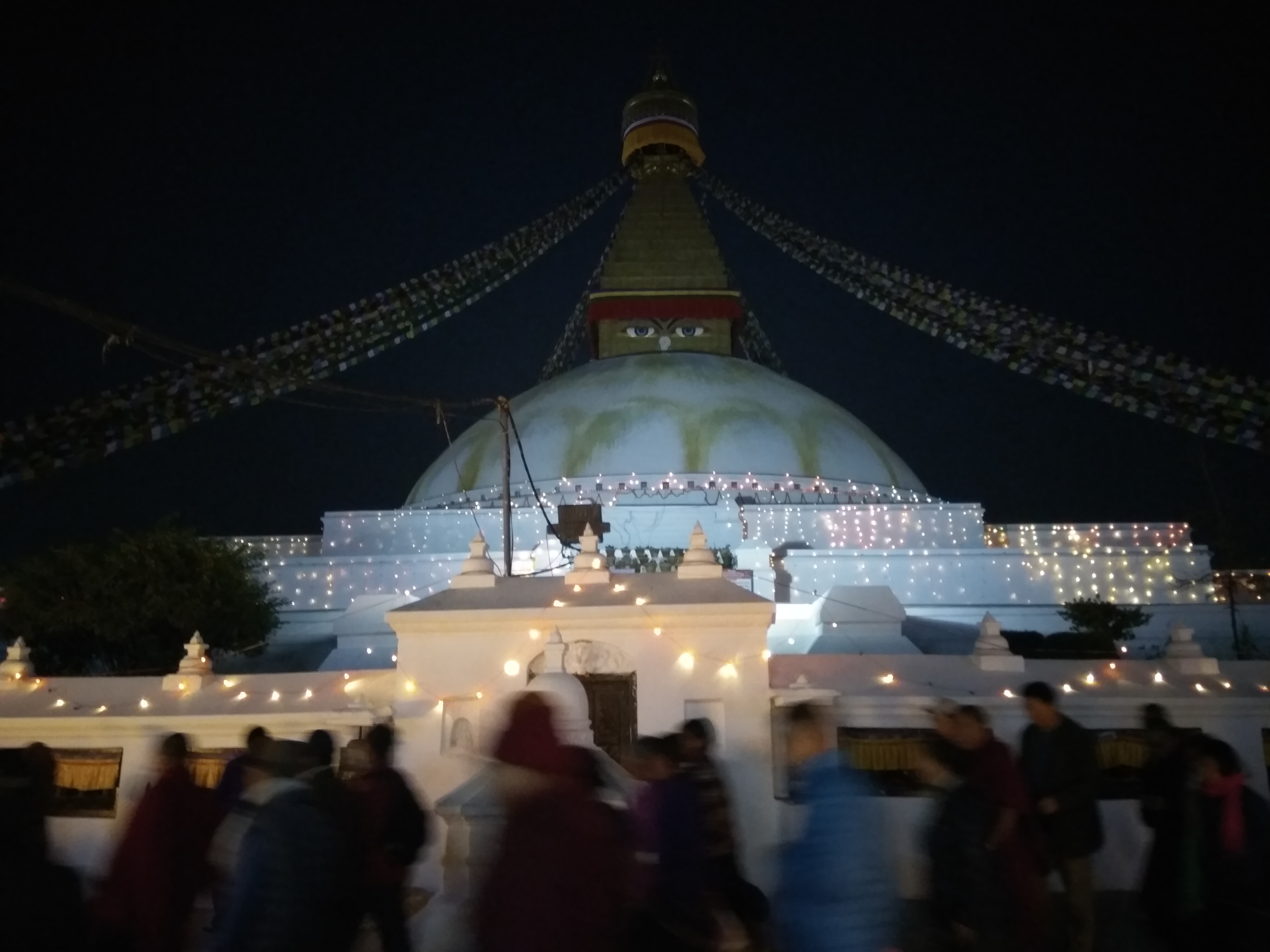
Boudhanath during evening Kora

- Hidden lands (beyul): secret or hidden lands; paradisiacal realms located in the remotest parts of the Himalayas.
- Holy person: a pilgrimage can be made to pay respects to a holy person, the holy person in such instances being considered a né.

The pilgrim is known as a né korwa "one who circles a né" (Tibetan: གནས་སྐོར་བ, Wylie: gnas skor ba), thus defining them by the ritual circumambulation(s) they perform as part of their journey. Pilgrims seek to generate merit (see Merit (Buddhism) by performing koras, which are a major merit generator. The more potent the power place destination the greater the merit. A kora is performed by walking or repeatedly prostrating oneself. Prostration (e.g., versus walking), circumambulating repeatedly or an auspicious number of times all produce greater merit. Kora may also be performed while spinning prayer wheels, chanting mantra, or counting rosary beads. Buddhist pilgrims most typically emulate the path of the sun and circumambulate in a clockwise direction. Bön pilgrims traditionally circumambulate counterclockwise.
