= Hill Miri people =

Native tribe of Arunachal Pradesh, northeast India

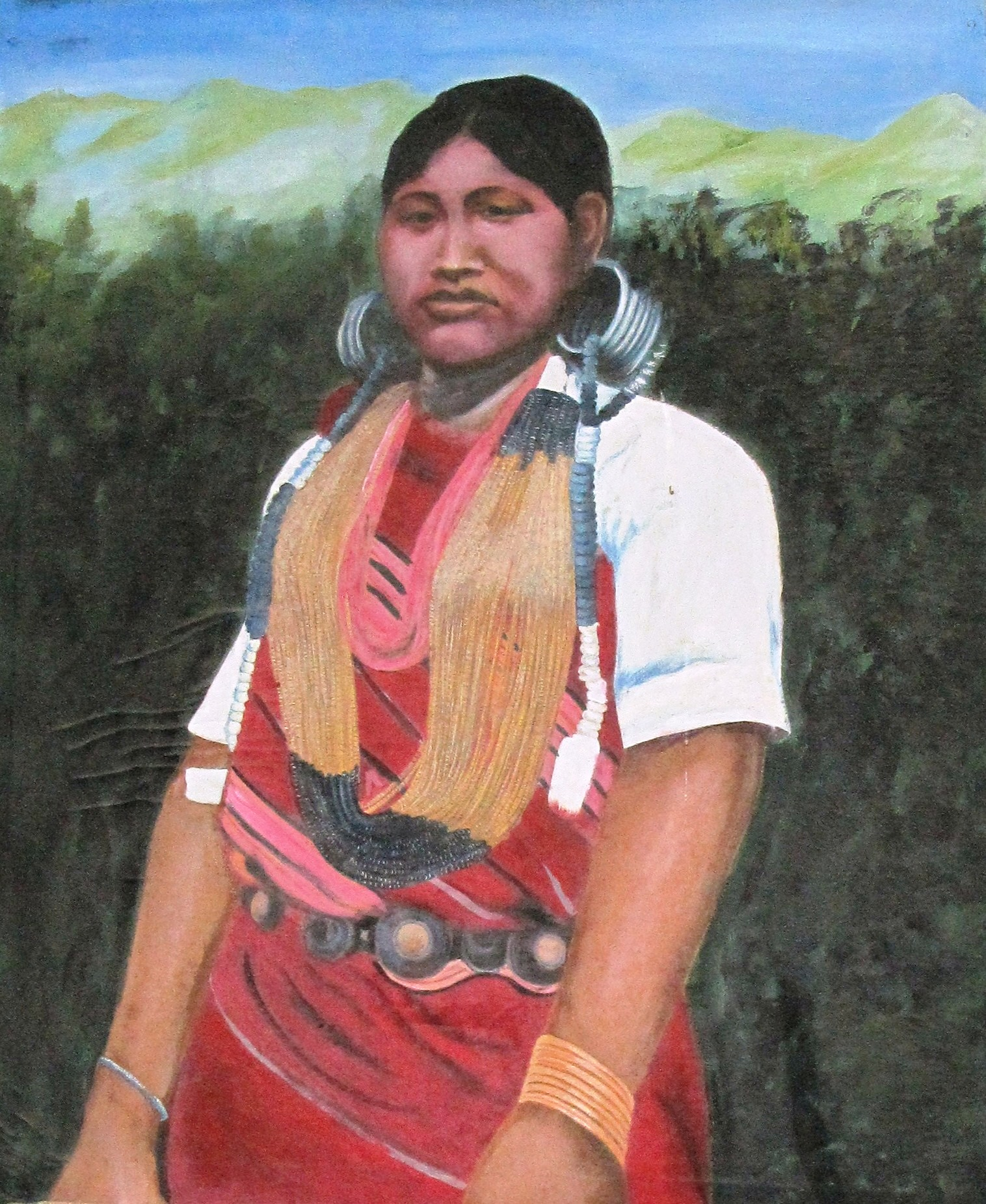
Portrait of a Nyishi girl

The Hill Miri are a native tribe of Arunachal Pradesh in Northeast India. They are spread in Upper Subansiri Kamle and adjoining districts. They speak a Tibeto-Burman language, but the exact origin of their language is disputed.

The tribe are agriculturalist and primarily grow crops such as echin (rice), temi (millet), muku (cucumber), tekk (ginger) and a host of green leafy vegetables. Jhum cultivation was dominant among the tribe but over the course of time have started adopting WRC gradually. They grow millet especially to prepare a local brew (opo), also made from the rice, which is very popular among members of the community and other tribes as well. The brew is served in plenty on occasions like festivals, marriages, and parties.

== Etymology ==
The term "Hill Miri" was given by the British Administration to distinguish between the “Plain Miri” of Assam and the “Nyishi” of Arunachal Pradesh.

== Festivals ==
The festival celebrated with enormous pomp and gaiety is Boori-Boot, on 6 February. The rituals of these festivals are carried out by the community priests (nyib) which include chanting of hymns and sacrificing animals viz. mithun (sob), goat, chicken (porok), pig (erek) etc., and serving of local brew (opo) to attendees.

The traditional attire of men includes lenin, cloth wrapped over the body covering the upper portion of the body up to the knees, and headgear includes a cap (bopar/bopa) made of cane which has a strap of bearskin attached anteriorly (sometimes with a hornbill beak at the top). The man carries a machete (orok) and a knife (rwchik) shoved inside a bamboo sheath wrapped with animal furs. The women's clothing includes a blouse and a long cloth (gale) wrapped around the waist with a beautiful piece of art knitted on it.
