= Dakpa Sheri =

Mountain in Tibet

- Tsari, Pure Crystal Mountain
- Dakpa Sheri (labelled as Tokpa Shiri) and vicinities in a map by Frederick Marshman Bailey

Highest point
- Elevation: 5,735 m (18,816 ft)
- Coordinates: 28°36′03″N 93°13′35″E (Note: OSM Contributors.)

Naming
- Native name: Dag-pa Shel-ri (Standard Tibetan); 达瓜西热 (Chinese)

Geography
- Location within Tibet Location within Arunachal Pradesh
- Dakpa Sheri and locations marking the pilgrimage (Note: Borders shown are those marked by the OpenStreetMap and may not be accurate.) Location in Tibet AR
- Country: China
- Region: Tibet Autonomous Region
- Parent range: Himalayas

Dakpa Sheri (Note: Alternative spellings include Takpa Shiri, Takpa Siri, Takpo Shar-ri and Né Dakpa Sheri.) (Tibetan: དག་པ་ཤེལ་རི, Wylie: dag pa shel ri, THL: dak pa shel ri, Chinese: 达瓜西热; pinyin: Dáguā Xīrè), explained as "Pure Crystal Mountain" and also known as Tsari (Tibetan: རྩ་རི, Wylie: rtsa ri; Chinese: 扎日; pinyin: Zhārì), is a mountain in the eponymously named Tsari region in Lhöntse County of Tibet's Shannan Prefecture. The Dakpa Sheri ridge consists of four hills/passes and four water bodies.

The mountain is considered sacred for Tibetans and every year, pilgrims circumambulate the mountain. Historically, pilgrims undertook a longer Rongkor circuit every twelve years, which passed through areas now in Arunachal Pradesh along the Tsari Chu and Subansiri rivers. Following border tensions between China and India, the pilgrimage was stopped after 1956.

== Etymology ==
Dakpa Sheri is usually classified as a néri (né–ri, abode–mountain) with the word "abode" being used in reference to deities. The Néri can be seen as the focus of Tibetan worship or kora.

The word Tsari (Tsa-ri) has been used for both the geographical area surrounding Dakpa Sheri as well as the mountain itself. Tsa is a consonant of the Tibetan script while ri means 'mountain'.

Variations include rTsá-ri which is explained as "Psychic Energy Channel Mountain", rTsa-ba which is explained as ''Foundation Mountain", Tswa-ri is explained as "Herb Mountain" and Tsa-ri rTswa-gon is "Superior Herb Psychic Energy Channel Mountain". The variation Tsa-ri-tra is a transliteration of the Sanskrit word Cáritra.

== Exploration ==
F. M.Bailey, H. T. Morshead, F. Ludlow, F. Kingdon-Ward have written about the mountain and the pilgrimage. In 1999, Toni Huber published his thesis on The Cult of the Pure Crystal Mountain.

== Geography ==
According to the Indian official T. S. Murty, Dakpa Sheri is located on the water-parting line of the Yume Chu and Pindigo rivers. Both the rivers are tributaries of the Subansiri River near the China–India Line of Actual Control, with Yume Chu being on the Chinese side and the Pindigo river on the Indian side.

The McMahon Line (1914) bisects the Rongkor pilgrimage route around the mountain. According to Alastair Lamb, by drawing the line around Dakpa Sheri, Henry McMahon "ignored, deliberately, the fact that the entire region was regarded by Tibetans as being sacred, and that every twelve years a pilgrimage ... was made" south of the line. According to Huber, Lhasa at the time probably did not think the British to be a threat to the pilgrimages, and hoped the border would not be ever implemented in the foreseeable future.

== Pilgrimages ==
Tibetan Buddhists consider Tsari sacred, in the same league with Mount Kailash. Its circumambulation is believed to derive as much merit as the circumambulation of Mount Kailash.

The circumambulation of the Dakpa Sheri (Takpa Siri or Tsari) is of two types: the Tsari Shungkor and the Tsari Rongkor. The Shungkor is annual while the longer Rongkor (also called the Rongkor Chenmo) was twelve-yearly. The Shungkor takes place every summer and autumn on a high-altitude circuit around the mountain, with its starting point in the Tsari Chu valley northwest of the mountain. The pilgrimage is seen as an opportunity to come face to face with Tsari's protective deities and ask for favors, request forgiveness or seek fortunes. Women are banned from a section of this circuit after the Drölma La pass, and from the upper mountain. They instead follow an alternative route known as the Kyemengi Korwa ("the low-born's circuit"), also known as the women's circuit.

The Rongkor took place every twelve years. Its route went down to the confluence with the Subansiri river (Chayul Chu river). Then it followed Chayul Chu upstream and later Yume Chu, to return to the starting point at Chösam. The Rongkor route passed through territories of tribal groups who were hostile to Tibetan pilgrims during the first half of the 20th century. In 1944, tribals massacred a large number of pilgrims, in part as a response to Tibetan government actions in 1906 that displaced the Nga and Boru tribes. In order to induce the Tagin tribe to allow unmolested passage to the pilgrims, the Tibetan government used to give lavish presents to them. The local Mra and Na peoples cooperated with the pilgrims and offered protection. The last Rongkor was in 1956. The next one due in 1968 as well as successive pilgrimages have not occurred due to border tensions between China and India. The pilgrimage was sometimes done along with a visit to the Tso Karpo or the Tsari Sarpa. These are respectively called the Tsari Nyingpa (transl. old Tsari) and the Tsari Sarpa (transl. new Tsari). Before the Sino-Indian border conflicts, the Migyitun town used to play a central role in the longer 12 year-pilgrimage. Tibetan officials and pilgrims numbering about 20,000 assembled in the town to make arrangements for the pilgrimage.
