= Seppa =

- City
- Seppa
- Location in Arunachal Pradesh, India Seppa (India)
- Coordinates: 27°21′41.907″N 93°2′25.944″E
- Country: India
- State: Arunachal Pradesh
- District: East Kameng
- Elevation: 363 m (1,191 ft)

Population (2011)
  - Total: 18,184

Languages - English, Hindi, Nyishi, Adi, Galo, Apatani,
- Time zone: UTC+5:30 (IST)
- Pincode(s): 790102
- ISO 3166 code: IN-AR
- Vehicle registration: AR
- Precipitation: 2,212 millimetres (87.1 in)
- Avg. summer temperature: 25 °C (77 °F)
- Avg. winter temperature: 9 °C (48 °F)
- Climate: Cwa

Seppa (formerly known as Sepla) is the headquarter of the East Kameng district in the state of Arunachal Pradesh in India. Sepla means 'marshy' land in the local dialect. It lies on the bank of Kameng River with a helipad located in the heart of the town. It is located 160 kilometres (99 mi) from Itanagar and 213 kilometres (132 mi) from Tezpur (Assam) connected by motorable road. The village of Seppa has two out of the sixty Vidhan Sabha Constituencies of Arunachal Pradesh. They are Seppa East and Seppa West.

== Demographics ==
As of 2001 India census, Seppa had a population of 14,965; males constituted 53% of the population and females 47%; 21% of the population was under 6 years of age; the average literacy rate was 53%—lower than the national average of 59.5%, with 64% male literacy and 41% female literacy.

== Media ==
Seppa has an All India Radio Relay station known as Akashvani Seppa. It broadcasts on FM frequencies.

== Transport ==
The nearest airways serving the area are Naharlagun Helipad (helicopter) and Holongi Airport (airplane), which are located in Naharlagun and Itanagar. People travelling from international destinations can board flights to Lokpriya Gopinath Bordoloi International Airport in Guwahati, which has connecting flights to Lilabari Airport in Assam, located close to Koloriang. Apst( Arunachal Pradesh state transport) bus services are available from Itanagar via Naharlagun on alternative days.. Presently commuters can also travel to Seppa via Wingers and Tata Sumo agencies.

It is on the NH13 which is part of the larger Trans-Arunachal Highway. A strategic road was constructed by BRO in 2017 in Kurung Kumey district between Huri (which is already connected to Koloriang) and Sarli after heavy construction equipment was heli-airlifted from Ziro, which will enable Koloriang-Huri-Sarli-Taliha-Daporijo connectivity by facilitating the construction of the remaining Sarli-Taliha section. Once Taliha-Daporijo, Taliha-Nacho, Taliha-Tato (headquarters of Shi Yomi district is completed, all of which were under construction in February 2021 while facing land acquisition issues, it will provide the strategic frontier connectivity from Seppa-Tamsang Yangfo-Sarili-Koloriang-Sarili-Nacho (and beyond to Daporijo-Taksing)-Tato (and beyond to Mechuka-Gelling and Aalo).

== Places of interest ==
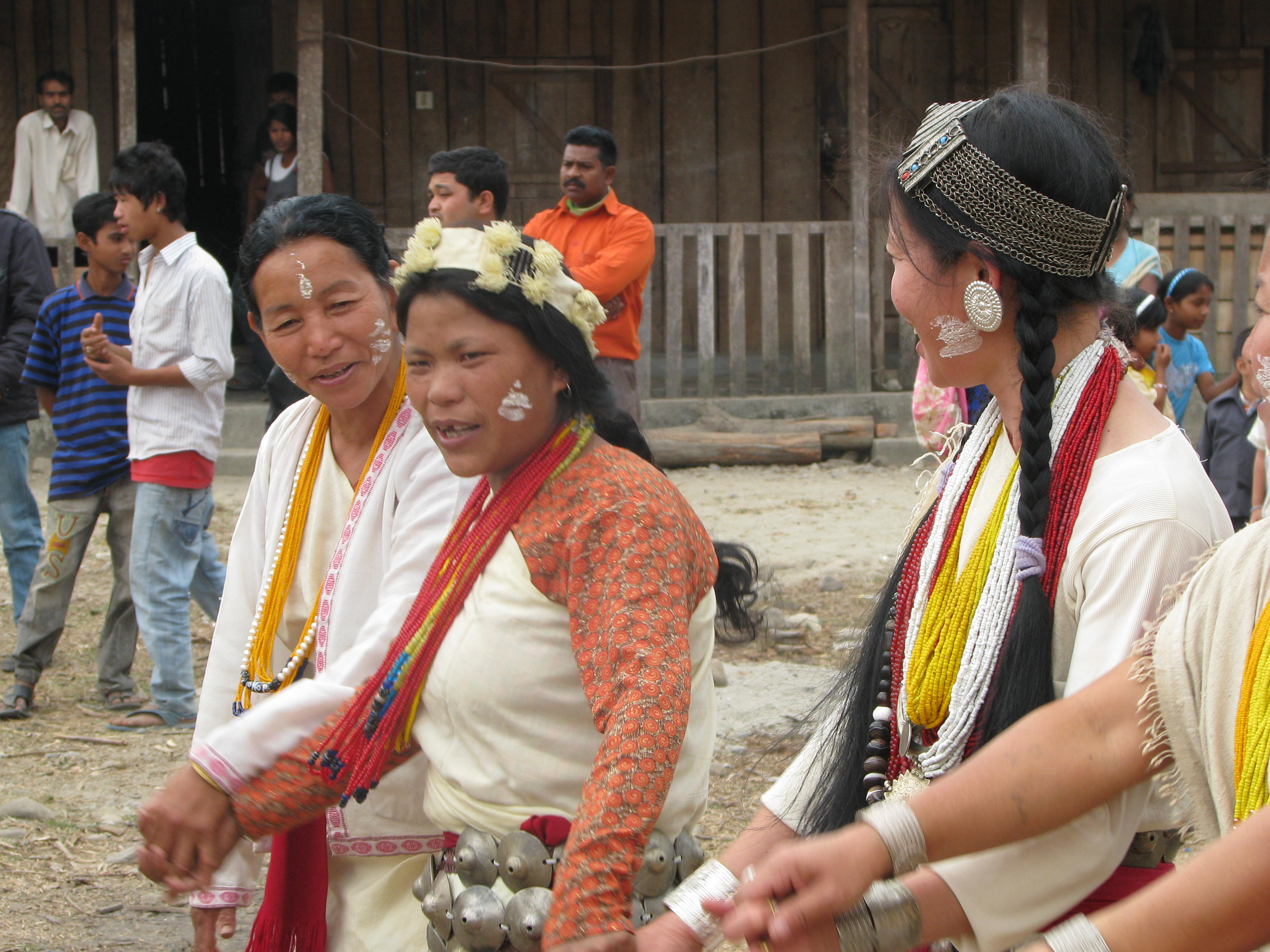
Nyishi women dancing during the annual festival, Nyokum Yullo.

Nyedar namlo, the place of worship of the Donyi-Polo religion is situated in the heart of the town. The two-storey building has a hall with a seating capacity of 100 people on the ground floor and the prayer hall is on the first floor. The sanctum sanctorum holds a white marble figure of the goddess Ane Donyi. The annual Nyokum Yullo, the main festival of the Nyishi people is celebrated on the Nyokum Lapang Ground adjacent to the namlo.

== See also ==
- List of districts of Arunachal Pradesh
