= Dumporijo =

Coordinates: 27.981°N 94.278°E

Dumporijo is a circle/ block under in Upper Subansiri district, in the state of Arunachal Pradesh. Pin - 791122

Dumporijo is located 12 km east of the district headquarter, Daporijo. Dumporijo is the 26th constituency of the Arunachal Pradesh Legislative Assembly. current MLA is Rode Bui party: Bharatiya Janata Party.
