= Lhünzê County =

Lhünzê County 隆子县 • ལྷུན་རྩེ་རྫོང་། Lhöntse
- County
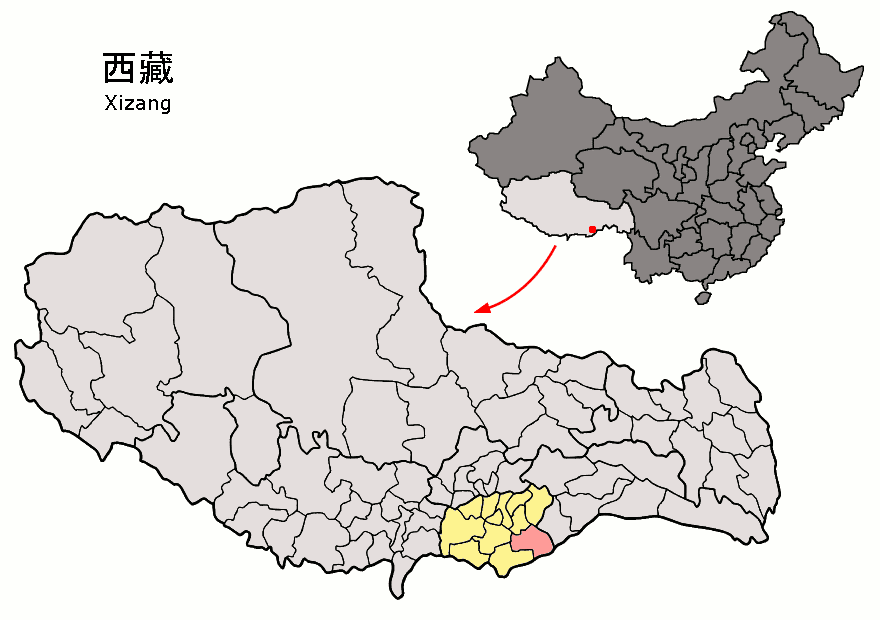
- Location of Lhünzê County (red) within Shannan City (yellow) and the Tibet Autonomous Region

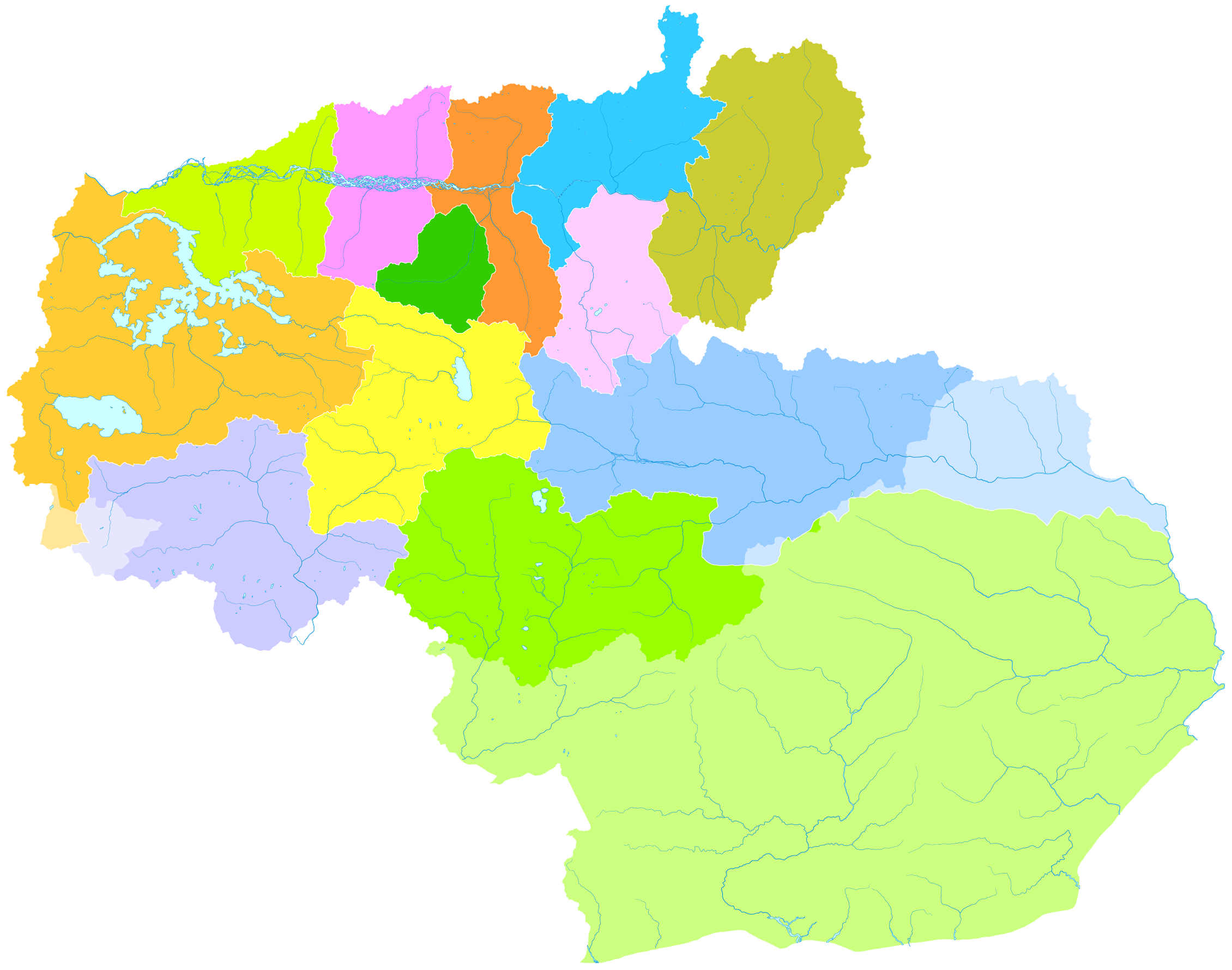
- The location of Lhünzê County in Shannan City (blue in the middle; disputed area in light blue)

- Location of the seat in the Tibet Autonomous Region Lhünzê (China)
- Coordinates: 28°49′56″N 93°16′25″E
- Country: China
- Autonomous region: Tibet
- Prefecture-level city: Shannan (Lhoka)
- County seat: Lhünzê

Area (de facto controlled)
  - Total: 8,165 km^{2} (3,153 sq mi)

Population (2020)
  - Total: 33,570
  - Density: 4.111/km^{2} (10.65/sq mi)
- Time zone: UTC+8 (China Standard)
- Postal code: 856600
- Website: www.longzixian.gov.cn

Lhünzê County

Chinese name
- Simplified Chinese: 隆子县
- Traditional Chinese: 隆子縣
Transcriptions
Standard Mandarin
- Hanyu Pinyin: Lóngzǐ Xiàn

Tibetan name
- Tibetan: ལྷུན་རྩེ་རྫོང་།
Transcriptions
- Wylie: lhun rtse rdzong
- Tibetan Pinyin: Lhünzê Zong

Lhünzê County (Tibetan: ལྷུན་རྩེ་རྫོང་།, Wylie: lhun rtse rdzong; Chinese: 隆子县) or Lhöntse Dzong is a county of Shannan located in the south-east of the Tibet Autonomous Region, China. "Lhünzê" means "self-existing pinnacle" in Tibetan. A part of Lhünzê County overlaps with the area disputed between China and India and is under Indian control as part of Arunachal Pradesh.

== History ==
During the Tibetan Empire period, this area was ruled by Nyal (gnyal), a stong-sde (lit. "general commanding one thousand soldiers") under the Left Horn (g.yon-ru). During the Yuan Dynasty, Qayü and Lhatruk were united to establish the Drupa Myriarch (gru-pa khri-skor). The Lhünzê Zong was established during Phagmodrupa dynasty. After 1912 Lhünzê was under the Governorate of Lhoka (lho kha spyi khyab), the Tibetan government listed Lhünzê Zong as one of the six first-class zong in the south of Lhoka (Shannan), where the fifth-grade officials were appointed as Dzongpon ("head of zong"). In August 1956, the Lhünzê Zong Office was established, under the leadership of the Shannan Branch Committee. In May 1959, Lhünzê, Qayü and Jora were merged to establish Lhünzê County.

In March 1959, the 14th Dalai Lama briefly stopped here to request permission for entry into India, by sending a letter to the Prime Minister of India Jawaharlal Nehru, during his escape from China.

== Geography ==
Lhünzê County covers an area of 10,566 square kilometers, and the de facto controlled area is 8,165 square kilometers. The terrain is higher in the west and lower in the east, with an average altitude of 3,900 meters. The lowest point is Zhongna Village in Tsari Township and Doyü Village in Doyü Lhoba Ethnic Township, with an altitude of 3,000 meters. In the south are the Himalayas with an altitude of over 5,000 meters. The upper reaches of rivers in the county are between 3,900 and 4,300 meters in elevation, with wide river beaches and grasslands. Lhünzê River, Xiongqu, Luoluoqu, Jiaboqu, Yumenqu, Jijiaqu and other rivers form deep valleys. There are 65 lakes with a total area of 33 square kilometers, and groundwater reserves of more than 50 million cubic meters. The hydropower capacity that can be developed and utilized is 100,000 kilowatts, and there are 15 hydropower stations with a total installed capacity of 4,750 kilowatts. The annual average temperature is above 5 °C, the annual average sunshine hours are about 3,000 hours, the annual frost-free period is 238.3 days, and the annual average precipitation is 279.41 mm. The months May–October account for 96.8% of the annual precipitation.

The Subansiri River, the largest tributary of the Brahmaputra, is formed in the county. A number of sub-tributaries such as Tsari Chu, Charme Chu, Nye Chu and Loro Chu flow through the county, and join the Subansiri in the adjoining Upper Subansiri district of Arunachal Pradesh in India.

== Administrative divisions ==
Lhünzê County comprises 2 towns, 8 townships and 1 ethnic township:

Name	Chinese	Hanyu Pinyin	Tibetan	Wylie	Population (2020)
Towns
Lhünzê Town	隆子镇	Lóngzǐ zhèn	ལྷུན་རྩེ་གྲོང་རྡལ།	lhun rtse grong rdal	8,371
Ritang Town	日当镇	Rìdāng zhèn	རི་ཐང་གྲོང་རྡལ།	ri thang grong rdal	7,287
Townships
Nyaimai Township	列麦乡	Lièmài xiāng	གཉལ་སྨད་ཤང་།	gnyil smad shang	1,949
Rirong Township	热荣乡	Rèróng xiāng	རི་རོང་ཤང་།	ri rong shang	3,771
Sangngagqoiling Township	三安曲林乡	Sān'ānqǔlín xiāng	གསང་སྔགས་ཆོས་གླིང་ཤང་།	gsang snags chos gling shang	2,959
Zhoinba Township	准巴乡	Zhǔnbā xiāng	སྒྲོན་པ་ཤང་།	sgron pa shang	429
Zhölsar Township	雪萨乡	Xuěsà xiāng	ཞོལ་གསར་ཤང་།	zhol gsal shang	4,006
Tsari Township	扎日乡	Zhārì xiāng	རྩ་རི་ཤང་།	rtsa ri shang	739
Yümai Township*	玉麦乡	Yùmài xiāng	ཡུལ་སྨད་ཤང་།	yul smad shang	266
Qayü Township	加玉乡	Jiāyù xiāng	བྱ་ཡུལ་ཤང་།	bya yul shang	3,183
Ethnic township
Doyü Lhoba Ethnic Township	斗玉珞巴民族乡	Dòuyù Luòbā mínzúxiāng	མདོ་ཡུལ་ལྷོ་པ་མི་རིགས་ཤང་།	mdo yul slo pa mi rigs shang	610
* includes areas claimed but currently under control of the Indian state of Arunachal Pradesh.

== Climate ==
Climate data for Lhünzê, elevation 3,860 m (12,660 ft), (1991–2020 normals)
Month	Jan	Feb	Mar	Apr	May	Jun	Jul	Aug	Sep	Oct	Nov	Dec	Year
Mean daily maximum °C (°F)	7.6 (45.7)	9.1 (48.4)	11.8 (53.2)	14.4 (57.9)	17.9 (64.2)	21.2 (70.2)	20.6 (69.1)	20.1 (68.2)	19.3 (66.7)	16.0 (60.8)	12.3 (54.1)	9.4 (48.9)	15.0 (59.0)
Daily mean °C (°F)	−4.0 (24.8)	−1.5 (29.3)	2.1 (35.8)	5.5 (41.9)	9.8 (49.6)	13.6 (56.5)	13.7 (56.7)	13.1 (55.6)	11.7 (53.1)	6.8 (44.2)	0.9 (33.6)	−2.7 (27.1)	5.8 (42.4)
Mean daily minimum °C (°F)	−13.2 (8.2)	−10.6 (12.9)	−6.5 (20.3)	−2.2 (28.0)	2.9 (37.2)	7.6 (45.7)	8.9 (48.0)	8.3 (46.9)	6.2 (43.2)	−0.9 (30.4)	−8.0 (17.6)	−11.2 (11.8)	−1.6 (29.2)
Average precipitation mm (inches)	0.5 (0.02)	0.7 (0.03)	2.0 (0.08)	9.9 (0.39)	17.6 (0.69)	43.8 (1.72)	92.7 (3.65)	77.8 (3.06)	36.8 (1.45)	8.9 (0.35)	1.7 (0.07)	1.3 (0.05)	293.7 (11.56)
Average precipitation days (≥ 0.1 mm)	0.9	0.9	2.3	6.3	8.6	14.0	21.2	19.7	13.3	3.1	0.9	0.4	91.6
Average snowy days	2.3	3.2	6.7	9.6	2.3	0.1	0	0	0.1	1.5	2.1	2.3	30.2
Average relative humidity (%)	47	47	48	51	53	57	65	66	62	55	51	50	54
Mean monthly sunshine hours	275.9	263.9	282.2	264.2	270.2	233.9	192.1	196.6	219.9	280.4	272.9	275.3	3,027.5
Percentage possible sunshine	84	83	75	68	64	56	46	49	60	80	86	86	70
Source: China Meteorological Administration

== Economy ==
At the end of 2017, the arable land area of Lhünzê County was 3269 hectares, the total sown area was 3365.93 hectares, and the sown area of grain crops was 2473.48 hectares, including 1789.22 hectares of highland barley, 320.25 hectares of wheat, 523.69 hectares of rape crops, 126.22 hectares of vegetables, 242.55 hectares of green fodder, and 242.55 hectares of grain crops in the county. The output is 18,910 tons, the rapeseed output is 1,060 tons, the number of livestock on hand at the end of the year is 162,660, the meat output is 3,101 tons, and the milk output is 8,026 tons. It mainly raises yaks, cattle, horses, donkeys, mules, and pigs. The economic trees include wild Peaches, apples, etc. The industry is dominated by national handicrafts, with grain processing, hydropower, construction and other industries. In 2018, the local GDP of Lhünzê County was 1,368.6 million yuan, of which the primary industry was 68.1 million yuan, the secondary industry was 1,046.3 million yuan, the tertiary industry was 254.2 million yuan, and the fixed asset investment of the whole society was 2,253.6 million yuan. The total retail sales of consumer goods was 148.9 million yuan, the industrial added value was 385.3 million yuan, the per capita disposable income of rural residents was 10,536 yuan, and the per capita disposable income of urban residents was 28,597 yuan.

== Society ==
In the seventh census of China in 2020, the permanent population of Lhünzê County was 33,570, including 17,005 males, 16,565 females, 6,934 aged 0–14, 22,766 aged 15–59, 3,870 aged 60 and over. 32,075 of the county's residents were Tibetans. There were 1171 people of Han nationality and 324 people of other ethnic minorities. The urban population was 5,527 and the rural population 28,043. As of the end of 2017, there were 46 schools of all kinds in the county, including 1 junior middle school, 8 township primary schools, 13 teaching sites, 24 kindergartens, and 12 medical institutions. There was 1 first-class hospital, 11 township clinics, and 1114.52 kilometers of highways.

== Mining Controversy ==
In 2018, the Chinese government launched large-scale investments into mining precious metals like gold and silver from the region. This followed reports that rare earth minerals valued at over $60 billion had been found. Reports suggest that the gold rush has led to an unprecedented influx of people into the region. This is perceived in India as China's plan to turn the border region disputed with India (Arunachal Pradesh) into "another South China Sea".
