= Taliha =

Village in Arunachal Pradesh, India

Coordinates: 28.234°N 94.146°E

Taliha is a village in the Upper Subansiri district in Arunachal Pradesh, India.

It is one of the 60 constituencies of the Legislative Assembly of Arunachal Pradesh.

Taliha is located 32 km north of the district headquarters in Daporijo. A strategic road was constructed by BRO in 2017 in Kurung Kumey district between Huri (which is already connected to Koloriang) and Sarli after heavy construction equipment was heli-airlifted from Ziro.This will enable Koloriang-Huri-Sarli-Taliha-Daporijo connectivity by facilitating the construction of the remaining Sarli-Taliha section. Once Taliha-Daporijo, Taliha-Nacho, Taliha-Tato (headquarters of Shi Yomi district is completed, all of which were under construction in February 2021 while facing land acquisition issues. It will provide the strategic frontier connectivity from Seppa-Tamsang Yangfo-Sarili-Koloriang-Sarili-Nacho (and beyond to Daporijo-Taksing)-Tato (and beyond to Mechuka-Gelling and Aalo).

== See also ==
- List of constituencies of Arunachal Pradesh Legislative Assembly
- Arunachal Pradesh Legislative Assembly
