= Migyitun =

Migyitun Tsari, Mikyimdün
- Township
- Location of the town in the Tibet A. R. Migyitun (Arunachal Pradesh)
- Coordinates: 28°39′37″N 93°22′25″E
- Country: China
- Autonomous region: Tibet
- Prefecture-level city: Shannan
- Elevation: 2,800 m (9,200 ft)
- Time zone: UTC+8 (China Standard)

Migyitun (Tibetan: ཀློ་མི་ཁྱིམ་བདུན, Wylie: klo mi khyim bdun, THL: lo mi khyim dün), officially called Tsari (Tibetan: རྩ་རི, Wylie: rtsa ri) or Zhari (Chinese: 扎日乡), is a township in the Lhöntse County of Tibet's Shannan Prefecture. It is on the banks of the Tsari Chu river close to the McMahon Line, the de facto border with India's Arunachal Pradesh. It was also a key part of the Buddhist Tsari pilgrimage, made once in twelve years, that makes a wide circumambulation of the Dakpa Sheri mountain.

== Etymology ==
The original Tibetan name Lo Mikyimdün (Wylie: klo mi'i khyim 'dugs) means "seven households of Lo", where Lo, a short form of Loyül or "Lopa country", which appears to cover the village area and the valley to the south. (This was distinguished from "Tsari", the "sacred ground", upstream of Migyitun.) The name refers to an old story regarding seven Tibetan families that came to live in this tribal territory a long time ago. People belonging to the Tagin tribe of Assam Himalayas still live in the village. (Note: Even though originally an ethnic description, over time, "Lopa" has acquired the sense of "barbarian", and is now considered a pejorative term. It is sometimes reused with an alternative spelling "Lhopa", meaning "southerner".)

== Location and background ==
Dakpa Sheri mountain and the locations marking the rongkor pilgrimage

The town of Migyitun is almost exactly where the Tsari Chu river cuts through the highest ridge line in the area. It was considered a border town of Tibet, south of which was the Assam Himalayan tribal territory (now called Arunachal Pradesh).

The Tsari Chu valley is considered holy ground by the Tibetans. Dakpa Sheri (or Takpa Shiri), a mountain peak to the west of Migyitun, is regarded so sacred that its circumabulation is believed to derive as much merit as the circumambulation of Mount Kailas. The Dakpa Sheri mountain attracts annual pilgrims who circle it over 3 days, passing through seven steep mountain passes. In addition, there is a larger pilgrimage that takes place once every 12 years that goes through the tribal territory of Assam Himalaya. It goes down to the confluence with the Subansiri river (or Chayul Chu river, as it is known in this segment). Then it follows Chayul Chu upstream and later Yume Chu, to return to the starting point at Chösam. In order to induce the Assam Himalayan tribes to allow unmolested passage to the pilgrims, the Tibetan government gave lavish presents to them.

The Migyitun town played a central role in the longer 12 year-pilgrimage. Tibetan officials and pilgrims numbering about 20,000 assembled in the town to make arrangements for the pilgrimage.

== History ==
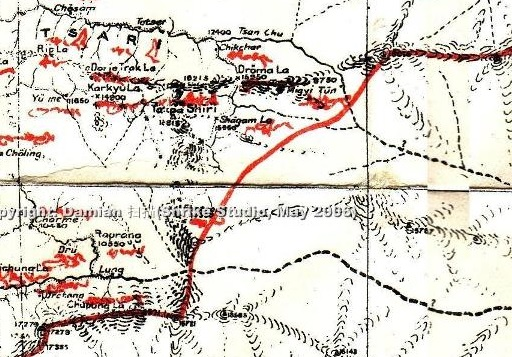
The McMahon Line in the Subansiri sector: "Mygyi Tun" marked where the Tsari Chu crosses the high ridge line

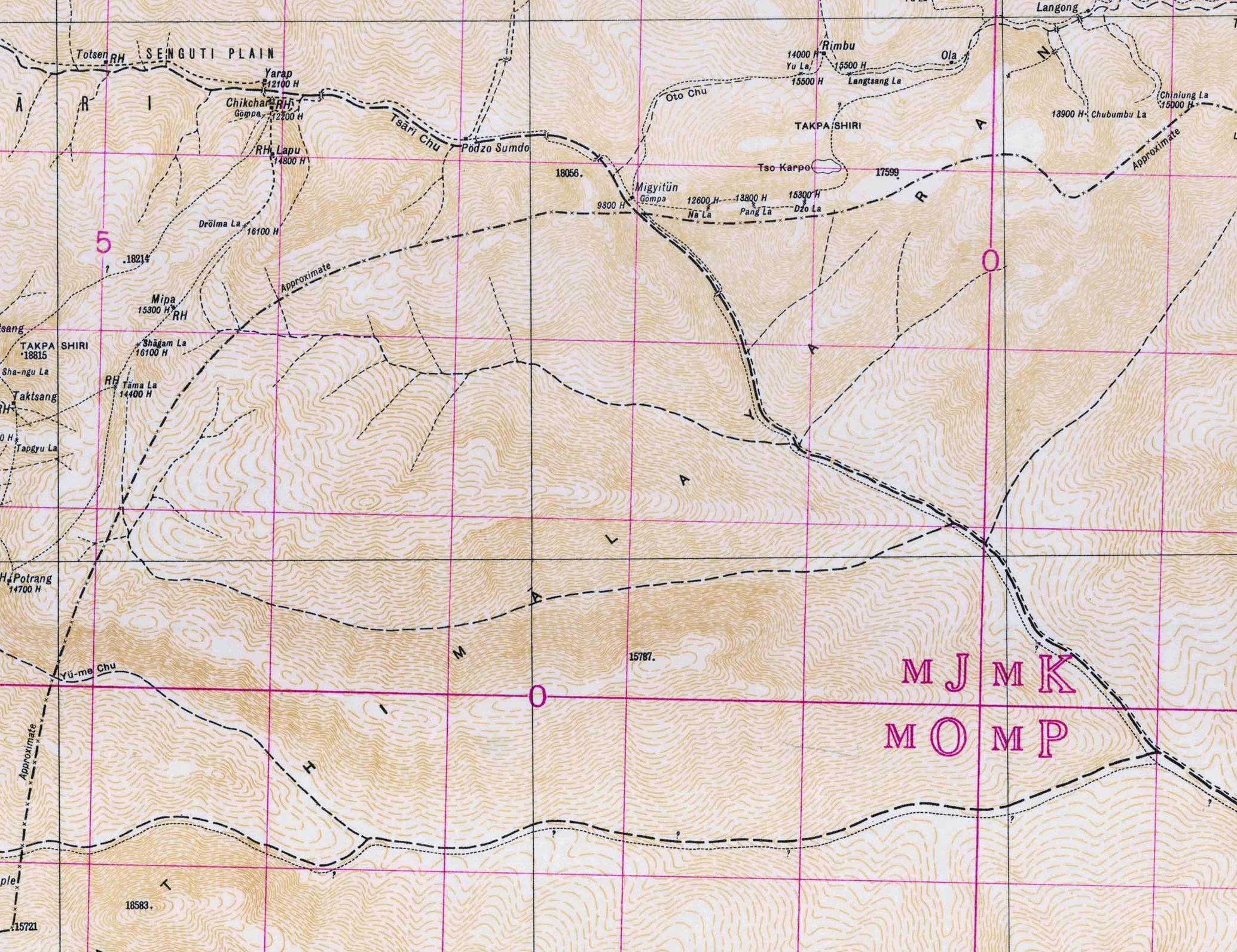
The McMahon Line depicted in a Survey of India map of 1940 (shown as approximate)

=== McMahon Line ===
During the negotiations for the McMahon Line in 1914, (Note: China calls the McMahon Line "illegal", claiming that Tibet was not independent. But the claim finds no support among the international law scholars.) the British Indian negotiators were cognisant of the fact that Migyitun was Tibetan and also that the neighbouring Dakpa Sheri mountain was regarded by them as a holy mountain. Taking these factors into account, they promised that the border would be drawn short of the high ridge line, and avoid including the annual pilgrimage route in Indian territory as far as practicable.

These arrangements were confirmed in the notes exchanged between McMahon and Lonchen Shatra and the border line was drawn accordingly. The line avoided both the north–south ridge line (which would have placed Dakpa Sheri on the border) and the east–west ridge line (which would have placed Migyitun on the border), and cut across the region along a diagonal. A suitable buffer south of Migyitun was retained within Tibet, but not so much as to include the confluence of the Mipa Chu river with Tsari Chu. McMahon believed that there was a "wide continuous tract of uninhabited country" along the south of the watershed.

=== 1930s ===
For various diplomatic reasons, the McMahon Line remained unimplemented for a couple of decades. It was revived in 1930s by Olaf Caroe, then Deputy Foreign Secretary of British India. The notes exchanged between McMahon and Lonchen Shatra were published in a revised volume of Aitchison's Treaties and maps were revised to show the McMahon Line as the boundary of Assam. The Surveyor General of India made adjustments to the McMahon Line boundary "based on more accurate topographical knowledge acquired after 1914". But he left certain portions approximate as he did not have enough information. Scholar Steven Hoffmann remarks that Migyitun, Longju (to the south of Migyitun) and Thagla Ridge (in Tawang) were among such places.

The maps drawn from 1937 onwards show the boundary more towards the watershed near Migyitun than the original treaty map. The Dakpa Sheri mountain and the pilgrimage route is shown entirely within Tibetan territory. But, at Migyitun, the border is immediately to its south.

== Bibliography ==
- Hoffmann, Steven A. (1990), India and the China Crisis, University of California Press, ISBN 978-0-520-06537-6
- Huber, Toni (1999), The Cult of Pure Crystal Mountain: Popular Pilgrimage and Visionary Landscape in Southeast Tibet, Oxford University Press, ISBN 978-0-19-535313-6
- Krishnatry, S. M. (2005), Border Tagins of Arunachal Pradesh: Unarmed Expedition 1956 (PDF), National Book Trust, ISBN 978-81-237-4460-5
- Mehra, Parshotam (1974), The McMahon Line and After: A Study of the Triangular Contest on India's North-eastern Frontier Between Britain, China and Tibet, 1904-47, Macmillan, ISBN 9780333157374
- Raghavan, Srinath (2010), War and Peace in Modern India, Palgrave Macmillan, ISBN 978-1-137-00737-7
- Rose, Leo E.; Fisher, Margaret W. (1967), The North-East Frontier Agency of India, Near and Middle Eastern Series, vol. 76, Office of Public Affairs, Department of State
