= Subansiri River =

Subansiri Chayul Chu
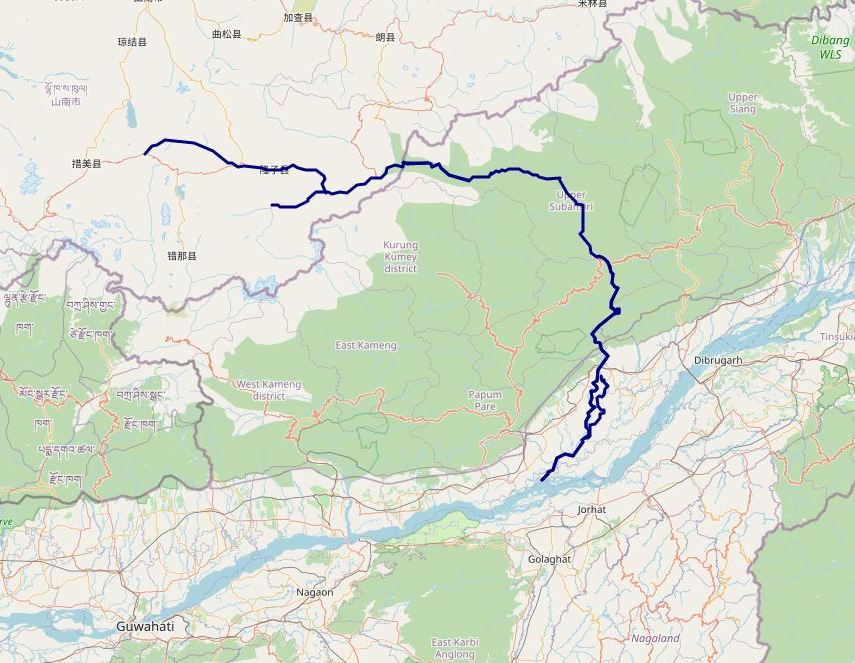
- Subansiri

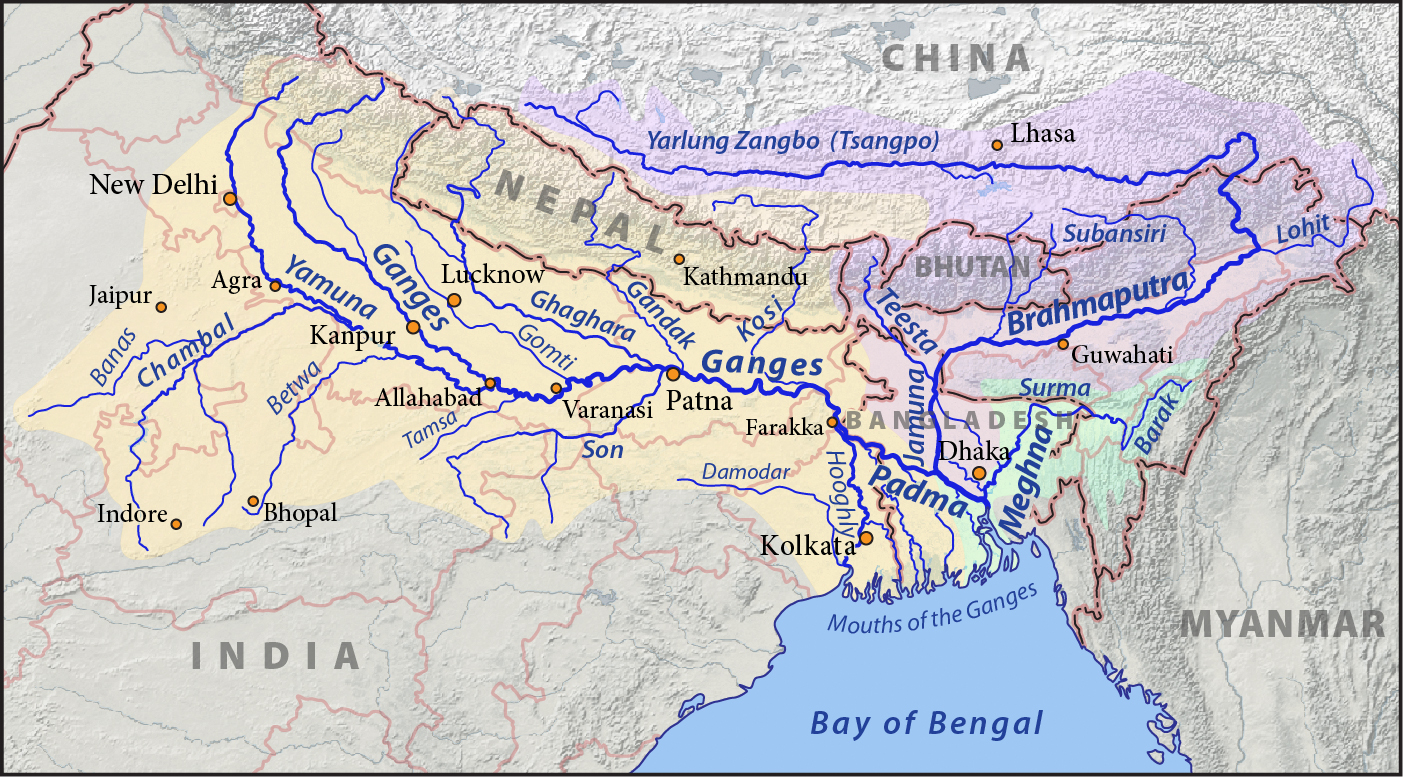
- Map of the combined drainage basins of the Ganges (yellow), Brahmaputra (violet) and Meghna (green) including the Subansiri River

Physical characteristics
- Source: Mount Porom
- Mouth: Brahmaputra

The Subansiri (Note: Hindi: सुबनसिरी नदी, romanized: Subansirî nadî; Chinese: 西巴霞曲; pinyin: xībā xiá qǔ) (Chayul Chu in Tibet) is a trans-Himalayan river and a tributary of the Brahmaputra River that flows through Tibet's Lhuntse County in the Shannan Prefecture in Southwestern China, and the Indian states of Arunachal Pradesh and Assam. The Subansiri is approximately 518 kilometres (322 mi) long, with a drainage basin 32,640 square kilometres (12,600 sq mi). It is the largest tributary of the Brahmaputra contributing 7.92% of the Brahmaputra's total flow.

== Name and etymology ==
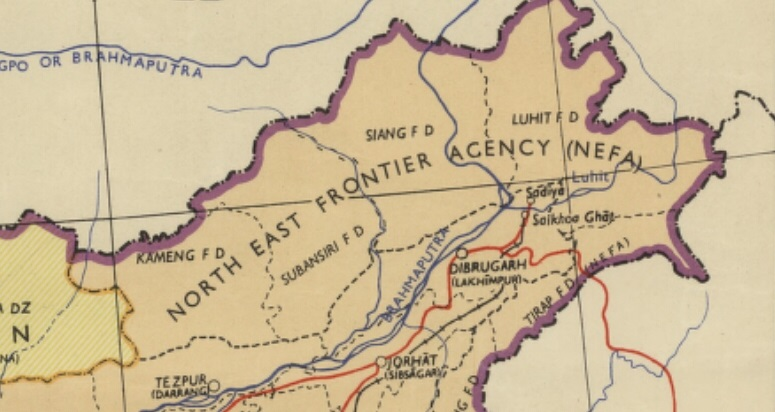
1954 map of the North-East Frontier Agency

Originally the name applied to the river only after the confluence of the Chayul Chu and Tsari Chu rivers at Gelensiniak. In early maps of independent India, Tsari Chu was marked as the main Subansiri river. However, over time, the name has been transferred to Chayul Chu. Within Tibet, the rivers are named after the locations they flow from such as Loro Chu, Nye Chu, Char Chu and Chayul Chu, all of which apply to the Subansirir or its tributaries.

And also in the Mising language, the river is referred to as Obonori. This name is distinct from the Sanskrit-derived Subansiri and has its roots in the indigenous Tani language. Obonori reflects the community's deep connection with the river, which is central to their culture, economy, and spiritual life. The exact etymology of Obonori is tied to the Mising people's unique linguistic and cultural heritage.

== Course ==
=== Chayul Chu ===
Chayul Chu is formed near Chayul Dzong with the merger of Nye Chu and Loro Chu.

Nye Chu originates in the Tsome County where it is called Sikung. After entering the Lhuntse County, it is called Nyel Chu or Lhuntse Shung Chu. Its valley, called Nyelto, includes important towns such as Ritang and Kyitang, the latter the capital of Lhuntse County. It flows for about 100 km before reaching Chayul Dzong.

Loro Chu is formed by the merger two headwaters: Loro Karpo Chu (or the "White Loro River") and Loro Nakpo Chu (or the "Black Loro River"). Both the rivers originate in the Tsona County, marked by passes that divide the waters of Subansiri from those of Tsona Chu. The two head streams merge near the town of Trathong. The combined river flows for about 40 km before reaching Chayul Dzong.

Chayul Chu flows for about 50 km in Tibet before entering Arunachal Pradesh near the town of Taksing. Before this, it is joined by Char Chu near the village of Lung, and Yume Chu just before entering Arunachal Pradesh.

=== Subansiri ===
It enters India near the town of Taksing and flows east and southeast through Miri Hills, then south to the Assam Valley at Dulangmukh in Dhemaji district, where it joins the Brahmaputra River at Jamurighat in Lakhimpur district. Small tributaries of the Subansiri include Rangandi, Dikrong and Kamle.

The Subansiri lends its name to two districts in Arunachal Pradesh: Upper Subansiri and Lower Subansiri.

The observed discharge of Subansiri is a maximum of 18,799 cubic metres per second (663,900 cu ft/s), and minimum of 131 m^{3}/s (4,600 cu ft/s). It contributes 7.92% of the Brahmaputra's total flow.

== Tributaries ==
=== Tsari Chu ===
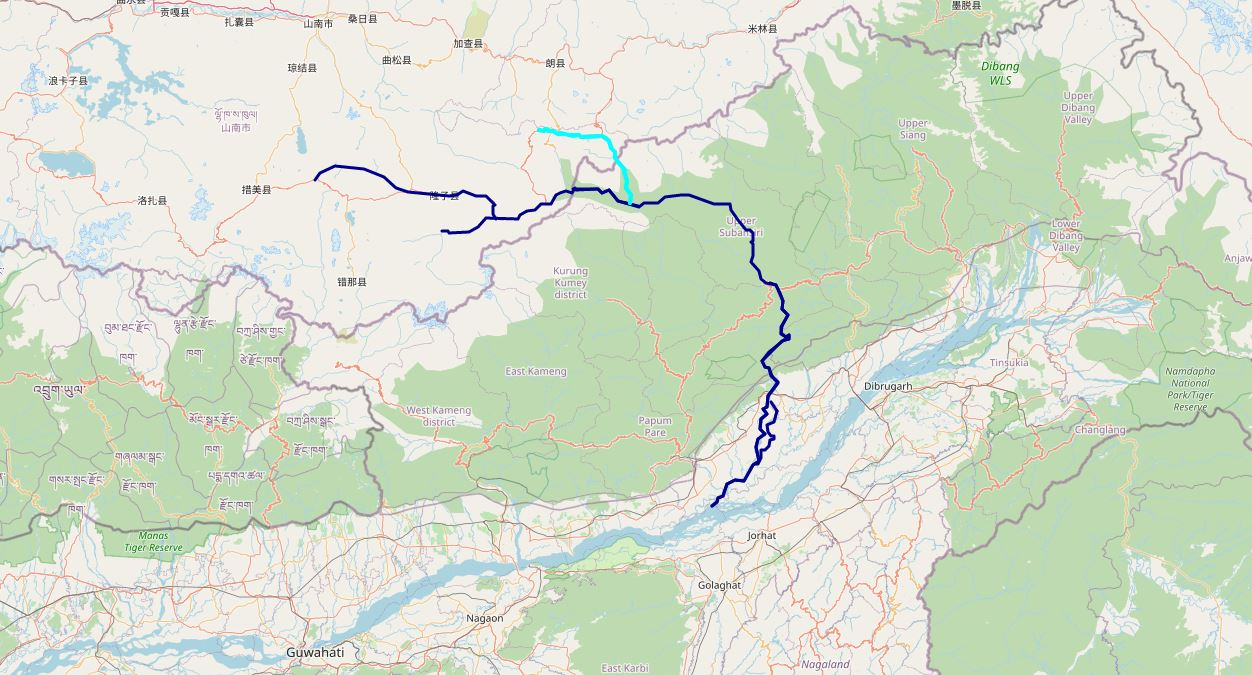
Tsari Chu marked in cyan

Tsari Chu (Chinese: 洛河; pinyin: Luò hé, "Lo River"; known as Lensi River in Arunachal Pradesh) rises near the village of Chosam in Tibet and flows east for about 25 miles till the town of Migyitun, where it turns south. It merges with the Subansiri at Gelensiniak. The district of Tsari, consisting of the Tsari Chu valley and its vicinity, is considered holy ground by the Tibetans. No animals are killed and no food is grown in these areas, with the exception of Migyitun. The holiness comes from the Dakpa Sheri mountain peak at the centre of the Tsari district, considered the home of the Buddhist Tantric deity Demchok (Chakrasamvara) and his consort Dorje Phagmo (Vajravārāhī). The pious Tibetans used to carry out a wide circumabulation (called rongkor or "ravine circuit") around the mountain once every 12 years, during the monkey year. They traversed the valley of the Tsari Chu river until its junction with Subansiri, and returned via the Subansiri and Yume Chu valleys. The last such circumambulation took place in 1956, after which the Sino-Indian border conflict has put an end to the practice.

== History ==
The 1950 Assam–Tibet earthquake caused landslides blocking the flow of Subansiri at Gerukamukh. After three days the blockade broke causing a massive flash flood. Over the years flooding of the river has caused loss to livelihood and life.

== Lower Subansiri Dam ==
The Lower Subansiri Dam or The Lower Subansiri Hydro-Electric Project is an under construction dam gravity dam on the river. The dam is seen as a problem with environmental and social impacts and many organisations are protesting against it. The River is a fiction book based on the issue and displays the issue as viewed by common Assamese people through its imaginary dolphins, fishes, and human characters.

== See also ==
- List of rivers of Assam
- Lower Subansiri Dam

== Bibliography ==
- Dorje, Gyurme (2004), Footprint Tibet Handbook with Bhutan (3rd ed.), Bath: Footprint Handbooks, ISBN 1-903471-30-3 – via archive.org
- Goyal, Manish; Gupta, Shivam; Sarma, Arup; Singh, Dhruv (2017). "Subansiri: Largest Tributary of Brahmaputra River, Northeast India.". In Dhruv Sen Singh (ed.). The Indian Rivers: Scientific and Socio-economic Aspects. Springer. pp. 523–535. doi:10.1007/978-981-10-2984-4. ISBN 9789811029844. LCCN 2017940312. S2CID 187246753.
- Huber, Toni (1999), The Cult of Pure Crystal Mountain: Popular Pilgrimage and Visionary Landscape in Southeast Tibet, Oxford University Press, ISBN 978-0-19-535313-6
- Krishnatry, S. M. (2005), Border Tagins of Arunachal Pradesh: Unarmed Expedition 1956, National Book Trust, ISBN 978-81-237-4460-5
