= Limeking =

- Village
- Location in Arunachal Pradesh, India Limeking (India)
- Coordinates: 28.3692°N 93.6115°E
- Country: India
- State: Arunachal Pradesh
- District: Upper Subansiri
- Circle: Limeking

Limeking is a village and the headquarters of an eponymous Circle in the Upper Subansiri district in Arunachal Pradesh, India. The village is about 143 kilometers from the district headquarters. It is one of the most remote villages in India and has limited connectivity with the rest of the world.

== Map ==
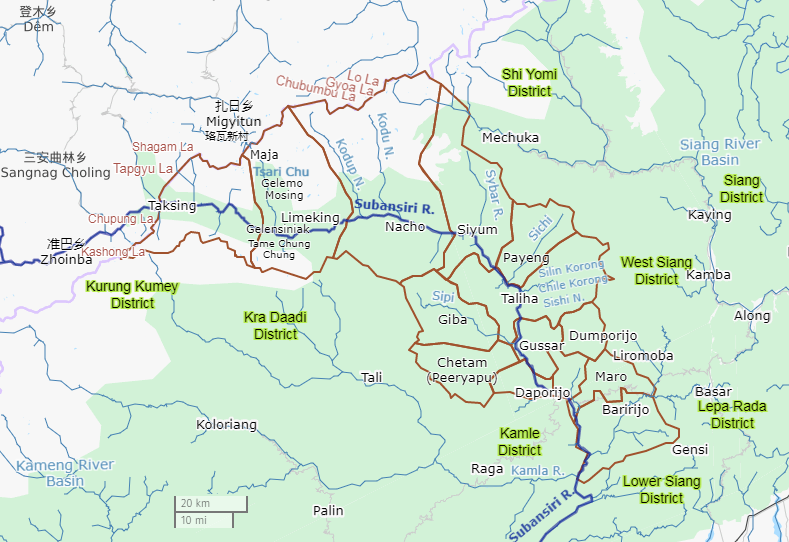
Limeking's location within Upper Subansiri district
