= Tagin people =

Tribe in Arunachal Pradesh, India

Tagin
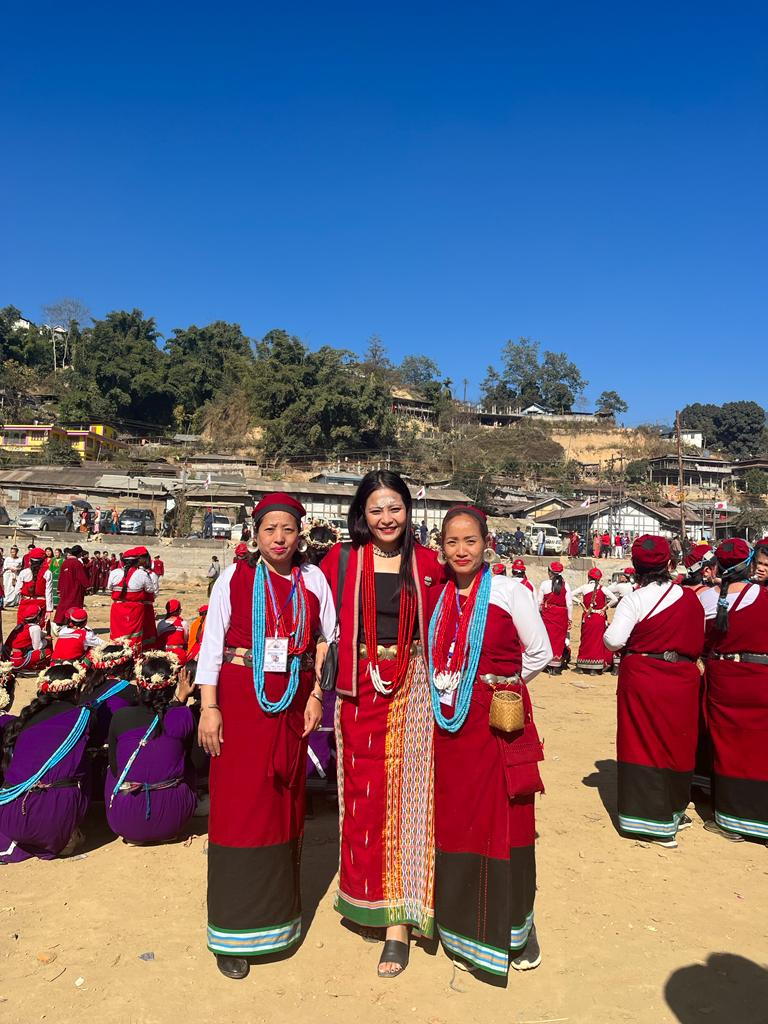
- Tagin Girls

Total population
- 62,931 (2011 census)

Regions with significant populations
- India: 62,931
- Arunachal Pradesh: 62,931
- China: 500
- Tibet Autonomous Region: 500

Languages
- Tani

Religion
- Majority: Christianity; Minority: Donyi Polo

Related ethnic groups
- Tibetan, Nyishi, Apatani, other Tani Tribes, Lhoba people

The Tagins are one of the major tribes of Arunachal Pradesh, India, a member of the larger designation of Tani Tribes. The Tagins refers to a tribe of Northeast India Region. The Tagins are members of the larger designation of Abotani (abo - 'father', tani - 'ancestor's name'). Most Tagin are now adherents of Christianity, with Buddhist, Hindu and Donyi Polo minority.

== Distribution ==
Tagins are the dominant tribe in Upper Subansiri district. They are also found dispersed in the adjoining districts, especially in West Siang, Papum Pare, in Arunachal Pradesh, as well as some areas of Tibet adjacent to Arunachal Pradesh.

== Population ==
According to 2011 census, there are 62,931 Tagin people in India. A few thousand in Tibet is expected. There are many clans among the Tagins, for example, Duchok, Mosing-Mosu, Tamin (Nakam, Nayam, Neva, Negia Nutik, Mindi (Nasi & Nalo) and Japo), Leyu, Reri, Natam-Gyadu (Bagang), Nah (Kojum), Gyama, Tache-Tagia, Tasi, Dui, Topo, Tani-Tator, Cherom-Chera, Buning, Heche, Kodak-Konia, Nalo, Pombu, Bagang (Nacho, Naji, Singming, etc.), Aiyeng (Payeng), Paji, Gumsing, Kojum Abu, among others.

== Language ==
Tagin people speak their own local dialect which is Tagin. Although there are tonal variations among them, these variations causes no hurdle in understanding each other.

== Religion ==
Originally the traditional Si-Donyi as a religion was being followed all around. Si-Donyi derives from ‘Si’ ('Earth'), and ‘Donyi’ ('Sun'), which follows the cult of animism and ritualistic nature worshiping in the form of spiritual deities where particular kind of animals or chickens are sacrificed at the altar (yogging-made out of the bamboos and wooden leaves with particular leaves or vines in stuffed shape) to please the spirits, more likely not anger them and keep them in their kind form. Priest or Nyibu shaman who are born with their powers are the ones who communicate and negotiate between the other world. They are the in-between messenger from this world to other world.

The Tagin people of Arunachal Pradesh have experienced a marked religious transformation over the past several decades, with Christianity becoming the dominant faith across most urban centers and the vast majority of villages, a shift driven by expanded schooling, missionary activity, and the community's growing engagement with wider social and economic networks. While many Tagins embraced Christian denominations and incorporated new forms of worship, social organization, and community institutions associated with the churches, the traditional Donyi-Polo belief system has not vanished; it remains actively practiced in a small number of villages, generally cited as two or three, where ritual specialists, ancestral narratives, and sun-moon cosmology continue to guide communal life. These remaining Donyi-Polo villages stand as important cultural anchors, maintaining oral traditions, ceremonial practices, and indigenous worldviews even as most Tagin settlements now identify primarily with Christianity, resulting in a landscape where older religious heritage and newer faith identities coexist in varying degrees depending on locality and generational change.

== Festivals ==
The most important festival of the Tagins is the Si-Donyi Festival, which involves the god of the earth (si) and the goddess of sun (donyi). Si-Donyi is celebrated from 3 to 6 January every year. It is celebrated for the well-being of mankind with the coming new year where the nyibu (local priest) presides over and performs all the rituals with chanting of Uuyu Benam (celestial chants). And sacrifice of Mithuns before the god-goddess for peace and prosperity in the community as a whole.

== Organisations ==
Tagin Cultural Society (TCS) and Tagin Welfare Society (TWS) are the main parental organisation of the tribe. There are also youth/student groups called All Tagin Students Union (ATSU) and All Tagin Youth Organisation (ATYO). The TWS or TCS also have many subgroups, and have been helping in shaping the future of the state.

== See also ==
- List of people of Tani descent

== Bibliography ==
- Upper Subansiri District Census Handbook, Part A (PDF), Directorate of Census Operations, Arunachal Pradesh, 2011
- Krishnatry, S. M. (2005), Border Tagins of Arunachal Pradesh: Unarmed Expedition 1956, National Book Trust, ISBN 978-81-237-4460-5, archived from the original on 10 August 2023
