= Upper Subansiri district =

- District of Arunachal Pradesh
- Location in Arunachal Pradesh

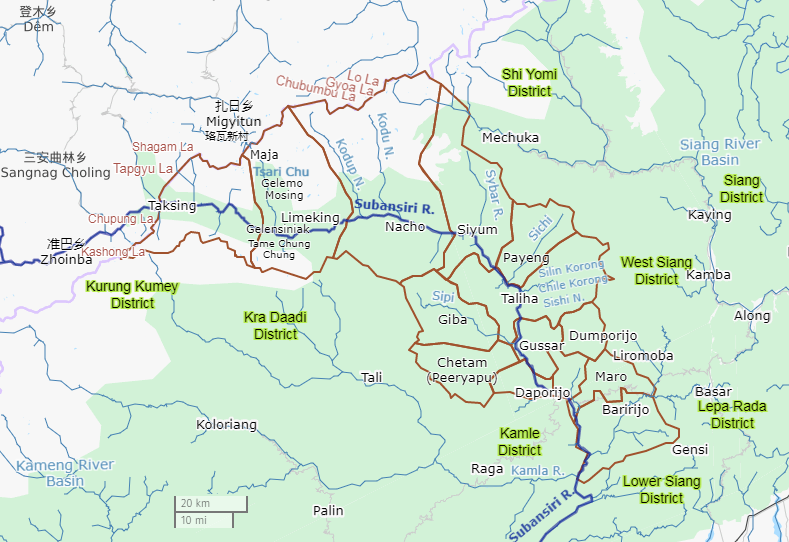
- Upper Subansiri district with administrative circles and other labels
- Coordinates (Daporijo): 28°18′N 94°00′E
- Country: India
- State: Arunachal Pradesh
- Headquarters: Daporijo

Government
  - District collector: Shri Tasso Gambo, IAS

Area
  - Total: 7,032 km^{2} (2,715 sq mi)

Population (2011)
  - Total: 83,448
  - Density: 11.87/km^{2} (30.74/sq mi)

Demographics
  - Literacy: 64.0%
  - Sex ratio: 982
- Time zone: UTC+05:30 (IST)
- Website: uppersubansiri.nic.in

Upper Subansiri district (/suːbənˈsɪri/) is an administrative district in the state of Arunachal Pradesh in India.

== History ==
The district was formed when Subansiri district was bifurcated into Upper and Lower Subansiri districts in 1980.

== Geography ==
Upper Subansiri district occupies an area of 7,032 square kilometres (2,715 sq mi), comparatively equivalent to the United Kingdom's East Falkland island.

The district headquarter is located at Daporijo. The important towns are Chetam, Giba, Taksing, Limeking, Nacho, Siyum, Payeng, Taliha, Gite Ripa, Gussar, Dumporijo, Daporijo, Maro, Baririjo and Puchigeku, each of which is the headquarters of a circle.

== Transport ==
The proposed 2,000-kilometre-long (1,200 mi) Mago-Thingbu to Vijaynagar Arunachal Pradesh Frontier Highway along the McMahon Line, (will intersect with the proposed East-West Industrial Corridor Highway) and will pass through this district, alignment map of which can be seen here and here.

== Divisions ==
There are four Arunachal Pradesh Legislative Assembly constituencies in this district: Nacho, Taliha, Daporijo and Dumporijo. All of these are part of Arunachal West Lok Sabha constituency.

== Demographics ==
Historical population
Year	Pop.	±% p.a.
1961	24,481	—
1971	32,014	+2.72%
1981	39,410	+2.10%
1991	50,086	+2.43%
2001	55,346	+1.00%
2011	83,448	+4.19%

According to the 2011 census, Upper Subansiri district has a population of 83,448, roughly equal to the nation of Andorra. This gives it a ranking of 621st in India (out of a total of 640). The district has a population density of 12 inhabitants per square kilometre (31/sq mi) . The population growth rate in the 2001–2011 decade was 50.34%. Upper Subansiri has a sex ratio of 982 females for every 1000 males, and a literacy rate of 63.96%. Scheduled Tribes make up 93.86% of the population.

Religions in Upper Subansiri district (2011)
Religion	Per cent
Donyi-Polo	71.24%
Hinduism	16.15%
Christianity	10.52%
Islam	0.62%
Other or not stated	1.47%

Languages of Upper Subansiri District (2011)
1. Tagin (78.7%)
2. Galo (14.9%)
3. Hindi (2.26%)
4. Nepali (1.05%)
5. Others (3.03%)

At the time of the 2011 census, 69.17% of the population spoke Tagin, 14.30% Galo, 9.30% Nyishi, 1.14% Bhojpuri and 1.05% Nepali as their first language.

== Education ==
Jawahar Navodaya Vidyalaya, Megdong for Upper Subansiri district is located about 10 km east from the administrative headquarter Daporijo.

== Tourism ==
Tourist sites in the area include:

- Aato Topo statue at Dumporijo; Ato Topo is the forefather of the Topo clan. Topo welfare society based in Dumporijo built a statue of Ato Topo at Dumporijo in Feb 2004. Dumporijo is located about 15 kilometers far, easterly to Daporijo, the district head-quarters.
- Menga mandir: a cave mandir with a huge Shiva Linga inside. The cave has two caves within, which goes down about 8 meters.
- Jalang waterfall at Timba village
- Keba Somara village where there is Yechung Gambung in the Subansiri river, which is believed to be linked to a cave/large crack in the mountain, 2 km away and has an associated history.
- Lingpi ligne at Dupit village has a huge Shiva Linga shaped stone (Lingpi coming out from earth) which has a
- Achin Muri is a historical place associated with the massacre of Indian Army in 1953
- Sher-e-Thappa statue commemorating an engagement with the Chinese for 72 hours in 1962 Indo-China war

Also, there is trekking from Siyum to Mechuka through the snow-laden Tikuk pass in the Tikuk mountain (during November). This trade route was part of the established barter practice between Tibet and the tribes in the region during 20th C.
