= List of districts of Arunachal Pradesh =

As of February 2024, the Indian state Arunachal Pradesh comprised 27 districts, not including Itanagar capital complex, with more districts proposed. Most of the districts are inhabited by various tribal groups. The latest and presently valid official map of districts of Arunachal Pradesh, after the most recent new districts were last announced on 30 August 2018, is in the external links.

== History ==
Year of formation of districts in Arunachal Pradesh
1965	[5] Kameng, Subansiri, Siang, Lohit and Tirap
1980	[9] Lower Subansiri, Upper Subansiri, Lohit, Dibang Valley, East Siang, West Siang, East Kameng, West Kameng, Tirap
1984	[10] Tawang
1987	[11] Changlang
1992	[12] Papum Pare
1994	[13] Upper Siang
2001	[14, 15] Kurung Kumey, Lower Dibang Valley
2004	[16] Anjaw
2012	[17] Longding
2014	[18] Namsai
2015	[19, 20] Kra Daadi, Siang
2017	[21, 22] Lower Siang, Kamle
2018	[23-25-26] Pakke-Kessang, Lepa-Rada, Shi-Yomi
2024	[27, 28] Bichom Keyi Panyor
Numbers in brackets represent total number of districts in the state

- In September 1965, when control of the North-East Frontier Agency was transferred to the Ministry of Home Affairs, its five divisions, Kameng, Subansiri, Siang, Lohit and Tirap each became districts. Over the next few years many new districts were created out of the original five:
- On 13 May 1980 Subansiri district was bifurcated into two districts: Lower Subansiri district and Upper Subansiri district. Upper Subansiri district comprised the area occupied by the erstwhile Daporijo sub-division and Lower Subansiri district comprised the rest of the area occupied by the erstwhile Subansiri district.
- On 1 June 1980,
1. The erstwhile Lohit district was divided into two districts: Lohit district and Dibang Valley district.
2. Siang district was bifurcated into two districts: East Siang district and West Siang district.
3. Seppa and Bomdila sub-divisions of the Kameng district were transformed into East Kameng district and West Kameng district, respectively.
- On 6 October 1984, Tawang district was separated from East Kameng district.
- In 1987, the erstwhile Tirap district was divided into two districts: Tirap district and Changlang district.
- On 22 September 1992, the erstwhile Lower Subansiri district was again bifurcated into Lower Subansiri district and Papum Pare district.
- On 23 November 1994, Upper Siang district was split from East Siang district.
- On 1 April 2001, Kurung Kumey district was carved out from the erstwhile Lower Subansiri district.
- On 16 December 2001, Dibang Valley district was bifurcated into Dibang Valley district and Lower Dibang Valley district.
- On 16 February 2004, Anjaw district was carved out from the erstwhile Lohit district.
- On 19 March 2012, Longding district was carved out from the erstwhile Tirap district.
- On 25 November 2014, Namsai district was carved out from the erstwhile Lohit district.
- On 7 February 2015, Kra Daadi district was carved out from the erstwhile Kurung Kumey district.
- On 27 November 2015, a new Siang district was carved out from parts of East Siang and West Siang districts.
- On 22 September 2017, Lower Siang district, was carved out of West Siang and East Siang districts.
- On 4 December 2017, a new district called Kamle district was created from Lower Subansiri District and Upper Subansiri District, with its headquarters to be located in Raga. It comprises the administrative circles of Raga (which will be the district HQ), Kumporijo and Dollungmukh circles from Lower Subansiri District. The administrative circles taken from Upper Subansiri District will be Gepen Circle, Puchigeko Circle, Daporijo Sadar which falls under 25 Raga Constituency including Ligu and Liruk demarcation from Sigen Subansiri confluence in Single Administrative Unit.
- On 30 August 2018, following 3 new districts were formed:
1. Pakke-Kesang carved out of East Kameng district with five administrative units namely Pakke-Kessang, Seijosa, Pijiriang, Passa Valley and Dissingn Passo with district headquarters at Lemmi.
2. Lepa-Rada created by bifurcating the Lower Siang district with headquarters at Basar and 4 administrative units namely Tirbin, Basar, Daring and Sago.
3. Shi-Yomi created by bifurcating the West Siang district with its headquarters at Tato and 4 administrative units namely Mechuka, Tato, Pidi and Manigong.
- On 7 February 2024, following 2 new districts were formed:
1. Bichom from 20 villages from West Kameng and 11 from East Kameng district. It entails 3 circles – Bana, Richikrong and Lada – where Aka and Nyishi tribes live.
2. Keyi Panyor with 195 villages carved out from Lower Subansiri district and will also include Ter Gapin and Sam Sath area.

== Administrative divisions ==
=== Historical ===
In some contexts, the state was categorized into five older divisional groupings based on river basins and geography:

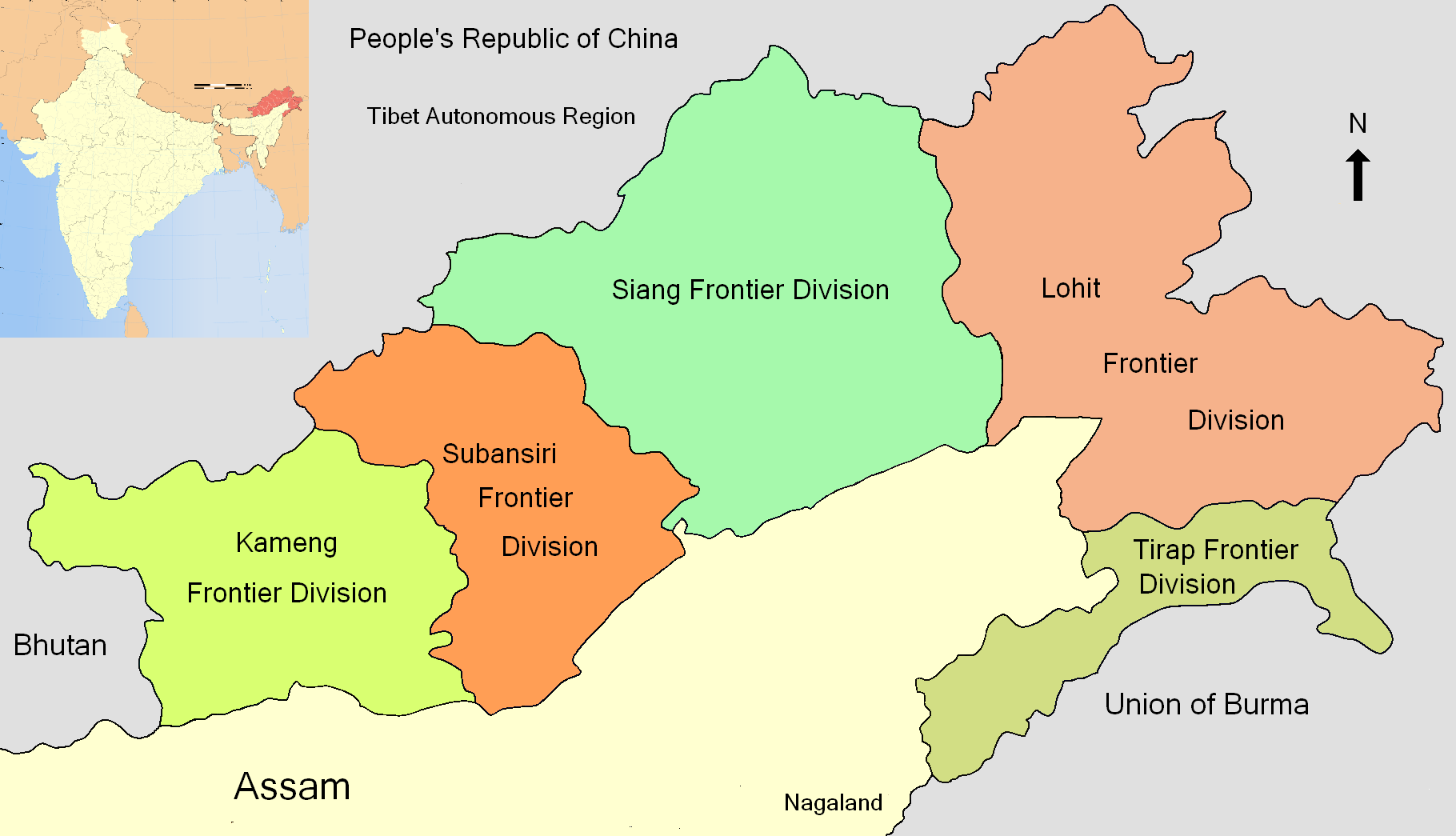
Divisions of Arunachal Pradesh

- Kameng Division (HQ: Bomdila) along Kameng River
- Subansiri Division (HQ: Ziro) along Subansiri River
- Siang Division (HQ: Pasighat) along Siang River
- Lohit Division (HQ: Tezu) along Lohit River
- Tirap Division (HQ: Khonsa) along Tirap River

=== Present ===
Arunachal Pradesh is primarily organized into administrative divisions, each headed by a divisional commissioner, an officer belonging to the Indian Administrative Service(IAS) and a deputy inspector general of police, an officer belonging to the Indian Police Service(IPS).

Sl. No.	Division	Headquarters	Coverage	Districts
1	West Division	Yazali (Lower Subansiri)	Western mountainous and foothills regions	Tawang; West Kameng; East Kameng; Pakke-Kessang; Bichom; Papum Pare; Lower Subansiri; Keyi Panyor; Kurung Kumey; Kra Daadi; Kamle; Upper Subansiri; Lepa Rada; Shi Yomi
2	Central Division	Siang	Siang and Subansiri river basins	West Siang; Siang; Upper Siang; East Siang; Lower Siang
3	East Division	Namsai	Eastern river basins and border regions near Myanmar	Lower Dibang Valley; Dibang Valley; Lohit; Anjaw; Namsai; Changlang; Tirap; Longding

== Districts ==
=== Itanagar capital complex ===
Itanagar capital complex is administered by its own Deputy Commissioner, and contains the three circles of Itanagar, Naharlagun, and Banderdewa. In January 2013 the Arunachal Pradesh government approved in principle the creation of a "Capital district". The capital complex is currently treated as its own district by some government departments, the Ministry of Micro, Small and Medium Enterprises for example, and the Arunachal Pradesh State portal in particular. But the Arunachal Pradesh reorganization of district Act of 1980 with the latest amendments from 2024 does not list Itanagar capital complex as a district.

=== List of Districts ===
Districts of Arunachal Pradesh since 2018
Legend： Capital Year created 2018 Year created 2017 Year created 2015 Created before 2015

The districts of Arunachal Pradesh state are administrative geographical units, each headed by a deputy commissioner, an officer belonging to the Indian Administrative Service and a superintendent of police, an officer belonging to the Indian Police Service.

List of districts is as follows:

Sl No	Code	District	Headquarters	Population (2011)	Area (km^{2})	Density (/km^{2})	Year created	Map
1	AJ	Anjaw	Hawai	21,089	6,190	3	2004	
2		Bichom	Napangphung	9,710	2,897	12	2024	
3	CH	Changlang	Changlang	147,951	4,662	32	1987	
4		Dibang Valley	Anini	7,948	9,129	1	2001	
5	EK	East Kameng	Seppa	78,413	4,134	19	1980	
6	ES	East Siang	Pasighat	99,019	4,005	25	1980	
7		Kamle	Raga	22,256	200	111.28	2017	
8		Keyi Panyor	Yachuli				2024	
9		Kra Daadi	Jamin	22,290	2,202	10	2015	
10		Kurung Kumey	Koloriang	89,717	8,818	10	2001	
11		Lepa-Rada	Basar				2018	
12	EL	Lohit	Tezu	145,538	2,402	61	1980	
13	LD	Longding	Longding	60,000	1,200	50	2012	
14	UD	Lower Dibang Valley	Roing	53,986	3,900	14	2001	
15		Lower Siang	Likabali	80,597			2017	
16	LB	Lower Subansiri	Ziro	82,839	3,460	24	1980	
17		Namsai	Namsai	95,950	1,587	60	2014	
18		Pakke-Kessang	Lemmi				2018	
19	PA	Papum Pare	Yupia	176,385	2,875	61	1992	
20		Shi-Yomi	Tato	13,310	2,875	4.6	2018	
21		Siang	Boleng	31,920	2,919	11	2015	
22	TA	Tawang	Tawang Town	49,950	2,085	24	1984	
23	TI	Tirap	Khonsa	111,975	2,362	47	1965	
24	US	Upper Siang	Yingkiong	33,146	6,188	5	1994	
25	UB	Upper Subansiri	Daporijo	83,205	7,032	12	1980	
26	WK	West Kameng	Bomdila	87,013	7,422	12	1980	
27	WS	West Siang	Aalo	112,272	8,325	12	1980	

== Proposals for new districts ==
Several local movements and political representatives have proposed the creation of new administrative districts across Arunachal Pradesh to address challenges related to geographical isolation, border management, and administrative accessibility.

List of Proposed Districts in Arunachal Pradesh Grouped by Current District
Proposed District	Proposed HQ	Expected Area of Jurisdiction and Rationale
Proposed from Tawang
Zemithang	Zemithang	Located northwest of Tawang town, near the India-Tibet-Bhutan tri-junction. Proposed to improve border area administration.
Lumla	Lumla	Located west of Tawang town, near the Bhutan border.
Mago	Mago	Located east of Tawang town and north of Nafra.
Proposed from West Kameng
Semteng	Semteng	Located on the southeastern border of Bhutan, west of Shergaon and Bomdila.
Sangti	Sangti	Located in the Sangti Valley, northeast of Bomdila.
Proposed from Kurung Kumey (and adjacent districts)
North Subansiri	Sarli	Proposed to be carved from three existing districts along the northern Indo-China border: entailing Sarli and Damin (from Kurung Kumey), Pipsorang and Longding Koling (from Kra Daadi), and Taksing, Limeking, Nacho, and Siyum (from Upper Subansiri). Located west of Koloriang.
Kumey	Patuk	Proposed from Kurung Kumey district, covering an estimated population of 12,000 across the Damin, Parsi-Parlo, and Panja-Sing circles. Located east of Sarli and Koloriang.
Chulla	Chulla	Situated within the Kurung Kumey administrative boundaries.
Proposed from Papum Pare
Sagalee	Sagalee	Proposed to entail the existing sub-divisions of Sagalee, Leporiang, Parang, and Mengio.
Proposed from Upper Subansiri
Limeking	Limeking	Located northwest of Nacho.
Sinalita	Nacho	Comprising the administrative circles of Siyum, Nacho, Limeking, and Taksing in the northern section of Upper Subansiri.
Proposed from Shi Yomi
Mechuka	Mechuka	Located in the existing Shi Yomi district, east of Nacho.
Monigong	Monigong	Located east of Mechuka and west of Tuting.
Proposed from Upper Siang
Tuting	Tuting	Expected to include the Singa, Gelling, Paling, Miging, and Tuting circles along the India-China border and the Yarlung Tsangpo River (Brahmaputra).
Sinik (Singa)	Singa	Located southeast of Tuting towards Anini, along the India-China border.
Proposed from Dibang Valley
Asunli	Asunli	Western part of the district, west of Anini towards Tuting and Singa.
Engolin	Engolin	Northern part of the district, north of Mipi and Anini.
Malinye	Malinye	Eastern part of the district, southeast of Anini and east of Etalin towards Chaglagam (north of Fish Tail-II).
Esuli (Yamne-Sikang)	Esuli	Southern part of the district, located along the Sikang (Dibang) river, approximately 180 km south of Anini and 145 km north of Roing. The proposed headquarters sits near the confluence of tributary rivers along the under-construction Arunachal Frontier Highway.
Proposed from Anjaw
Chaglagam	Chaglagam	Northwestern part of Anjaw district, immediately south of Fish Tail-II.
Hayuliang	Hayuliang	Southwestern part of Anjaw district.
Dong	Dong	Northeastern part of Anjaw district, including Kibithu.
Proposed from Changlang
Vijaynagar	Vijoynagar	Includes the Namdapha National Park and Tiger Reserve.
Diyun	Diyun	Located between the Namsai district headquarters and Miao.
Jairampur	Jairampur	Southwest of Diyun, on the border with Assam.
Nampong	Nampong	Located near the Pangsau Pass on the border with Myanmar along NH-3155 (Ledo Road).
Rima	Miao	Proposed in 2017 to entail the subdivisions of Diyun, Bordumsa, Kharsang, Jairampur, Nampong, Rima-Putak (Tikhak), Miao, and Vijoynagar. However, the proposal faced unanimous opposition from the Changlang People's Forum.
Proposed from Tirap
Borduria	Borduria	Located approximately 10 km north of the Tirap district headquarters in Khonsa.

== See also ==
- List of districts in India
