= Trans-Arunachal Highway =

Highway in India

Route information
- Length: 2,407 km (1,496 mi)

Major junctions
- From: Tawang, Arunachal Pradesh
- To: Akro, Assam

Location
- Country: India
- States: Arunachal Pradesh

Highway system
- Roads in India; Expressways; National; State; Asian

The Trans-Arunachal Highway (TAH), which includes an existing 1,811 km (1,125 mi) route comprising NH-13 (1,559 km (969 mi)) and parts of NH-15 (80 km (50 mi)), NH-215 (30 km (19 mi)) and SH-25, is an under-construction 2-lane more than 2,407 km (1,496 mi) long highway passing through 16 districts in Arunachal Pradesh state in India. It runs from LAC in Tawang in northwest to Kanubari in southeast at the tri-junction of Assam-Nagaland-Arunachal Pradesh. It connects at least 16 districts of Arunachal Pradesh.

The Trans-Arunachal Highway, passing through the entire length of the state, roughly divides Arunachal Pradesh state in two parts - the upper two-third in north and east and lower one-third. At least 1811 km route already exists as national highway, and remaining are either greenfield or an upgrade of existing routes to national highway standard. It starts from India's north most military post (north of Hathung La Ridge) in Tawang district, goes via Zemithang, Tawang, Bomdila, Nechipu, Seppa, Sagalee, Yupia, Yazali, Ziro, Daporijo, Aalo, Pasighat, southern part of Dibang Valley district, Lohit, Roing, Tezu, Mahadevpur, Bordumsa, Namchik, Changlang, Khonsa, Longding, and ends at Kanubari.

The Trans-Arunachal Highway greatly helps in reducing isolation of the people by connecting the district headquarters, major hydro electric power projects and other important places. Trans-Arunachal Highway, along with the under-construction Arunachal East-West Corridor across the lower foothills inside Arunachal Pradesh along the Assam border and the proposed Arunachal Frontier Highway along the China border, are important enablers of Northeast development and India's Look East connectivity strategy. This strategically important highway network enhances Indian military's capabilities in combating the threat of China's Western Theater Command opposite India's eastern sector of Line of Actual Control.

In October 2022, 1,458 km long route was complete and already operational. TAH, from Tawang to Kanubari in Longding district has a target completion date of March 2024.

== History ==
In January 2008, the project was announced by then Prime Minister of India, Manmohan Singh.

== Construction agencies ==
Following follow agencies are responsible for the construction of TAH in several packages.

- Arunachal Pradesh state Public Works Department (APPWD): responsible for a 978-km stretch, of which 394.59 km is already complete by Aug 2021, and the remaining 583.41 km is under construction in several packages with target completion date of March 2024.
- Border Roads Organisation (BRO)
- Ministry of Road Transport and Highways (MoRTH)
- National Highways and Infrastructure Development Corporation Limited (NHIDCL)

== Project details ==
=== Route: existing ===
- NH-13
  - Tawang-Dirang-Bomdila-Rupa-Nechiphu-Seppa: Sela Tunnel, with target completion by 2023, will provide shorter all-weather alternative connectivity.
    - Rupa-Bhutan border: must be upgraded as an additional project NH-13- Shergaon-Samteng-Sumdrung, then greenfield to Bhutan border.
  - Seppa-Pakke-Kessang-Yachuli:
    - A shorter direct Seppa-Mengio HQ- Meomey Sullong-Ziro spur must be constructed as an additional project.
  - Yachuli-Ziro-Daporijo-Aalo-Pasighat-Roing-Lohit-Tezu-Parshuram Kund (Brahmakund)-Wakro:
    - Lohit-Chowkham short distance must be upgraded to National Highway as an additional project and a river bridge exists there already.
- NH-15:
  - Wakro-Namsai:
    - Wakro-Deban camp (Namdapha National Park) must be upgraded to national highway as additional project to connect to Arunachal Frontier Highway to Vijoynagar
- NH-215:
  - Namsai-Bordumsa
- NH-?
  - Bordumsa-Kharsang-Jairampur: being upgraded to NH.
    - Kharsang-Miao must be upgraded to national highway as additional project to connect to Arunachal Frontier Highway to Vijoynagar (Namdapha National Park).
- NH-315
  - Jairampur-Tikhak Taipi:
- NH-?
  - Tikhak Taipi-Manmao-Rima-Changlang: being upgraded.
- NH-215
  - Changlang-Khonsa:
- NH-?
  - Longding-Kanubari-Rajgarh-Bogibeel bridge-: being upgraded.
    - Longding-Mon spur must be constructed as a national highway as an additional project.

=== Future extensions ===
Following extensions are needed to optimise the connectivity with the neighboring states and beyond, as these extensions will enable the larger national strategic objectives including eliminating the vulnerability of Siliguri Corridor.

- Tuting-Moreh Highway: Tuting-Pango-Payum-Silapathar-Bogibeel-Tuli-Tuensang-Ukhrul-Nambashi-Yongkhul-Keipham-Khudengthabi:
  - From Tuting in Arunachal to Bogibeel Bridge to Tuli (Nagaland): via Lezai Miri Pathergam, Naharani on NH-2, Hati Barua and Charimuthia Gaon to Changdhore.
  - Changdhore-Lahon-Yaongyimsen: greenfield.
  - Ladaihgarh to Tuli: brownfield.
  - Zunheboto-Jessami: greenfield upgrade.
  - Jorcheng-Shirui Ching-Wuyakachui: greenfield upgrade.
  - Wuyakachi-Ningchou: brownfield upgrade
  - Ningchou-Nh102A Khonglo: greenfield.
- Sumdrung in Arunachal - Kangpar-Pasapu-Narpu in Bhutan
  - Arunachal-Sikkim via Bhutan: Narpu-Galechugaon-Darphu-Chukka-Dengna-Dorokha - Rango Forest on India-Bhutan border, to NH-717A at beginning of SH-12
  - SH-12: Upgrade from Bhutan border to Nepal border at Mana Bhanjang.
  - Nepal-India connectivity: Mana Bhanjang on Nepal-West Bengal border to Gooduk (upgrade existing), Damak (greenfield), to Chichhora (upgrade existing F02) on Nepal-Bihar border.
  - Bihar connectivity: upgrade existing SH-99 Chichhora-Jogihat-Baisi to NH-29.

== Six Inter-corridor highways ==
To providing missing interconnectivity between three horizontal national highways across Arunachal Pradesh - Frontier Highway, Trans-Arunachal Highway and East-West Industrial Corridor Highway - following six vertical and diagonal national highway corridors of total 2178 km length will be built, which will also provide faster access to geostrategically important areas on India-China LAC.

See the following, listed west to east:

- Thelamara-Tawang-Nelia inter-corridor, 402 km.
- Itakhola-Seppa-Parsi Parlo inter-corridor, 391 km.
- Gogamukh-Taliha-Tato inter-corridor, 285 km.
- Akajan-Jorging-Pango inter-corridor, 398 km.
- Pasighat-Bishing inter-corridor.
- Kanubari-Longding inter-corridor, 404 km.

== Tourism ==
- Swadesh Darshan Tourist Circuits along the highways in Arunachal: In 2015 under the Swadesh Darshan Scheme, the Indian approved the funds to develop the following two tourist circuits in Arunachal Pradesh:
  - "Bhalukpong-Bomdila-Tawang Tourist Circuit" along the Arunachal Frontier Highway at the cost of ₹49.77 crore: The "facilities like accommodation, cafeteria, wayside amenities, last mile connectivity, pathways, toilet were built at Sorang Monastery, Lumpo, Zemithang, Bumla Pass, Gritsang, TSO lake, PTSO Lake, Thingbu and Grenkha Hot Spring, Lumla, Sela Lake." A multipurpose hall was built at Jang.
  - "Nafra-Seppa-Pappu-Pasa-Pakke Valleys-Sangdupota-New Sagalee-Ziro-Yomcha Tourist Circuit" along the Trans-Arunachal Highway at the cost of ₹97.14 crores: The "helipad, wayside amenities, trekking trails, rafting centre, log huts, craft bazaar, eco park, tourist facilitation centres, parking, multipurpose Hall, festival ground etc." were built.

== Current status ==
- 2018 Feb: ₹100,000 million (US$1.1 billion) Tawang to Wakro NH-13 became operational in 2018 when 6.2 km long Dibang River Bridge was completed across Dibang River. This completion of entire NH-13, partially completes the route for Trans-Arunachal Highway.
- 2021 Aug: TAH, from Tawang to Kanubari, is being constructed by 4 entities: Arunachal Pradesh state PWD (APPWD), BRO, MoRTH, and NHIDCL. Of the 978 km allocated to APPWD, 394.59 km is already complete and remaining 583.41 km is under construction in several packages with target completion date of March 2024.
- 2022 Oct: 1,458 km long route, out of 1,540 km long approved DPR, is complete and operational. Remaining 82 km is under construction. Another nearly 300 km long roure is either being completed under other projects or the DPRs are in various stages of preparation and approval.
- 2026 Apr: The upgrade of the entire ~1600 km route is complete except ~60 km long Longding-Mon sections.

== Related connectivity ==
Arunachal Pradesh connectivity projects

- Bhalukpong-Tawang railway, under-construction
- Arunachal Frontier Highway, proposed along Indo-China border across upper Arunachal Pradesh
- Arunachal East-West Corridor, proposed across foothills of lower upper Arunachal Pradesh

Northeast connectivity projects

- Northeast Connectivity projects
- Look-East Connectivity projects
- North-South and East-West Corridor
- India-Myanmar-Thailand Friendship Highway
- BCIM Economic Corridor
- Asian Highway Network
- List of bridges on Brahmaputra River

== See also ==
- List of national highways in India
- National Highways Development Project
- Expressways of India
- Golden Quadrilateral (GQ)
