= Arunachal Frontier Highway =

Proposed border highway in Arunachal Pradesh, India

Route information
- Length: 1,748 km (1,086 mi)

Major junctions
- West end: Bomdila in West Kameng district
- East end: Vijaynagar in Changlang district

Location
- Country: India
- States: Arunachal Pradesh
- Major cities: Nafra, Sarli, Huri, Mechuka, Tuting, Hunli, Hayuliang, Hawai, Miao, Kharsang,

Highway system
- Roads in India; Expressways; National; State; Asian

Arunachal Frontier Highway, officially notified as the National Highway-913 and also called Bomdila-Vijaynagar Highway, connecting Bomdila in northwest to Vijaynagar in southeast including 800 km greenfield section and network of new tunnels & bridges, is mostly lntermediate-lane (5.5 m or 18 ft) and in some sections 2-lane paved-shoulder under-construction national highway along the India-Tibet border in the Indian state of Arunachal Pradesh. The 1,748 km-long (1,086 mi) highway itself will cost ₹27,000 crore (equivalent to ₹310 billion or US$3.2 billion in 2026) and total cost including 6 additional inter-corridors is ₹40,000 crore (equivalent to ₹460 billion or US$4.8 billion in 2026).

In some places, this highway will run as close as 20 km from the LAC. To be constructed by MoRTH in 9 packages, all packages will be approved by the end of FY 2024-25 (March 2025) and construction will be completed by 31 March 2029. Of the total route, 800km is greenfield, rest brownfield will be upgraded and tunnels will be built. This highway in the north & east Arunachal along the China border would complement the Trans-Arunachal Highway (through the middle of Arunachal) and the Arunachal East-West Corridor (in south Arunachal in foothills along the Assam border) as major highways spanning the whole state, pursuing the Look East connectivity policy.

== History ==
=== Conveived ===
In 2016, empowered committee on border infrastructure asked the MoRTH to prepare the detailed project reports (DPR) as per the alignment agreed by the home ministry, defence ministry & Arunachal state government. In 2018, Home ministry enhanced the alignment for the additional connectivity. MoRTH identifies the highway as one of the 29 corridors close to the 3,600 km international border, to be undertaken as a NHDP (which has been subsumed by the Bharatmala project), though there is "little habitation" along the proposed route and only "small stretches of minor roads".

=== Construction ===
It will be constructed in the following nine packages, all approvals and land acquisition will be progressively completed by March 2025, and the construction will be progressively completed by March 2027 in fully government-funded "engineering procure and construct" (EPC) mode.

- Package-1 Nafra–Lada, 141 km (Nafra–Dibrick–Sachung–Lada): full budget approved in 2023.
- Package-2 Lada–Sarli, 200 km: for 106 km budget of ₹ 2,249 crore approved in Feb 2024.
- Package-3 Sarli-Tali, 201 km (Sarli-Huri–Parsi Parlo–Tali):
  - Sarli-Huri: for 35 km a budget of ₹626.92 crore approved in Feb 2024.
- Package-4 Tali–Mechuka, 225 km (Tali–Taliha–Siyum–Mechuka):
- Package-5 Mechuka–Bile, 183 km (Mechuka–Tato–Monigong–Tato–Bile):
- Package-6 Bile–Hunli, 230 km (Bile–Migging–Tuting–Singa–Anelye–Hunli):
- Package-7 Hunli–Hayuliang, 186 km:
- Package-8: Hayuliang–Miao, 285 km (Hayuliang–Changwinti–Hawai–Miao):
- Package-9 Miao–Vijaynagar, 157 km (Miao–Gandhigramm–Vijaynagar):
  - Kharsang-Gandhigram: for 61.5 km a budget of Rs 1,015 crore approved in Feb 2024.

== Details ==
=== Benefits ===
Various sources in the Government of India and media have mentioned the following reasons to build the highway:

- Highway will generate employment and increase tourism in these hard-to-reach areas.
- Highway will check Chinese incursions into Indian territory. China has built an extensive road and railway network on its side, posing a security risk to India as the region is relatively inaccessible on the Indian side.

=== Wildlife protection ===
India's National Board for Wildlife approved diversion of 310 hectares of Namdapha National Park - habitat for tigers (India is home to 76% of world's tiger population), clouded leopards, and red pandas (only panda species in India) - forest land for this highway for boosting state's remotest habitation's socio-economic development. The wildlife protection is a major consideration for the project, and to ensure the wildlife movement corridors are not disrupted by the highway the wildlife passage culverts and underpasses customised to the site-specific data-backed research have been constructed. The highway will also cross the Dibang Wildlife Sanctuary.

== Route ==
=== Main route (approved) ===
The high-altitude highway will originate from Mago-Thingbu in Tawang district and meander through the following border areas of Arunachal Pradesh along the McMahon Line: West Kameng district; East Kameng district; Upper Subansiri district; Mechuka in West Siang district; Tuting in Upper Siang district; Dibang Valley district; Desali in Lower Dibang Valley district; Chaglagam, Kibithu, Dong and Hawai all in Anjaw district; and end at Vijaynagar in Changlang district at the junction of Arunachal Pradesh, Assam, Nagaland and Myanmar. The map of alignment can be seen here.

Alignment by district, from west to east:

==== Western Arunachal Pradesh ====
- West Kameng district (capital Bomdila)
  - Bomdila - aviation ministry is planning an airport in Dirang just northeast of Bomdila
  - Thembang HQ, north of Bomdila.
  - Nafra Heliport ALG & HQ, east of Thembang & Bomdila.
  - Dishing, north of Nafra in Nafra circle.
  - Wothung, northeast of Dishing in Nafra circle.
- East Kameng district (capital Seppa)
  - Nissangjang in Lada circle, northeast of Wothung & Nafra.
  - Lada Heliport ALG & HQ, north of district HQ Seppa.
  - Bameng Heliport ALG & HQ, southeast of Lada.
  - Sawa Heliport ALG & HQ, northeast of Bameng
  - Chayangtajo Heliport ALG & HQ, northeast of Sawa.

==== Central Arunachal Pradesh ====
- Kurung Kumey district (capital Koloriang)
  - Koloriang Heliport ALG & district HQ, northeast of Chayangtajo.
  - Sarli Heliport ALG & HQ, northwest of Koloriang.
  - Huri Heliport ALG in Huri-Damin circle, northeast of Sarli.
  - Damin Heliport ALG in Huri-Damin circle, east of Huri.
- Upper Subansiri district (capital Daporijo Airport ALG)
  - Nacho Heliport ALG & HQ, northeast of Huri & Damin.
- West Siang district (capital Aalo Airport ALG)
  - Mechuka Airstrip ALG & HQ, north of Manigong.
  - Monigong Heliport ALG & HQ, east of Nacho.

==== Eastern Arunachal Pradesh ====
- Upper Siang district (capital Yingkiong)
  - Jido (Tuting Airstrip ALG) & HQ, east of Mechuka.
  - Singa, southeast of Tuting.
- Dibang Valley district (capital Anini under-construction Airport ALG)
  - Asunli, southeast of Singa.
  - Atiyi
  - Angolin
- Lower Dibang Valley district (capital Roing Airport ALG)
  - Hunli Heliport ALG & HQ, southeast of Anelih.
  - Desali HQ, east of Hunli.
- Anjaw district (capital Hawai)
  - Hayuliang Airport ALG & HQ.
  - Manchal Heliport ALG & HQ.
  - Hawai Heliport ALG & HQ.

==== Southeastern Arunachal Pradesh ====
- Changlang district (capital Changlang)
  - Miao HQ,
    - Miao-Kharsang HQ spur
    - Kharsang-Jagun spur
    - Kharsang-Bordumsa spur
  - Chenquenty
  - Vijaynagar Airstrip ALG, Miao-Vijaynagar route.

=== Six Inter-corridor highways (approved) ===
To providing missing interconnectivity between three horizontal national highways across Arunachal Pradesh - Frontier Highway, Trans-Arunachal Highway and East-West Industrial Corridor Highway - following six vertical and diagonal national highway corridors of total 2178 km length will be built, which will also provide faster access to geostrategically important areas on India-China LAC.

Listed west to east and within that south to north.

==== Thelamara-Tawang-Nelia ====
Runs along Thelamara-Tawang-Zemithang-Nelya Post (Nelia Post in northwest Tawang) for 402 km.

==== Itakhola-Seppa-Parsi Parlo ====
Runs along Itakhola-Pakke-Kessang-Seppa-Parsi Parlo for 391 km.

==== Gogamukh-Taliha-Tato ====
Runs along Gogamukh-Taliha-Tato for 285 km.

==== Akajan-Jorging-Pango ====
Runs along Akajan-Jorging-Pango for 398 km.

==== Pasighat-Bishing ====
Runs along Pasighat-Bishing for 298 km.

==== Kanubari-Longding ====
Runs along Kanubari-Longding for 404 km.

=== Proposed spurs ===
Listed west to east.

==== Tawang-Yabab Spur (under construction ) ====
Tawang-Yabab Border Post Highway spur as part of Tawang-Yabab-Yongphulla route, proposed as a 100 km long western spur from Tawang to Yongphulla Airport in Bhutan (upgraded by India and jointly used by the Indian Army and Bhutan Army) in eastern Bhutan via Lumla-Yabab Border Post in India and Trashigang in Bhutan. Tawang-Lumla-Yabab Border Post tenders awarded in 2024 with 2026 target completion.

==== Yabab-Yongphulla Spur (awaiting diplomatic approval) ====
Yabab-Yongphulla Highway spur as part of Tawang-Yongphulla route, is awaiting bilateral diplomatic clearance as it requires a formal bilateral treaty between India and Bhutan before physical construction tenders can be formally floated on the e-procurement network.

==== Miao-Kharsang-Jagun spur and Kharsang-Bordumsa spur (approved) ====
Miao-Kharsang-Jagun Highway spur approved and in tendering (May 2026 update).

==== Kharsang-Longding spur (approved) ====
Kharsang-Longding spur approved, tenders awarded, and presently under construction (May 2026 update).

== Connectivity ==
=== VVP feeder roads (approved) ===
Under the Vibrant Villages Programme, feeder roads to 122 border villages in Arunachal, at the cost of ₹2,205 crore, are being constructed which will connect to the Arunachal Frontier Highway. This budget also includes community centers and public infrastructure in those villages along the India-Tibet border to empower the villagers.

=== Within Arunachal Pradesh ===
Arunachal Frontier Highway will intersect with the:

==== Trans-Arunachal Highway (approved) ====
See Trans-Arunachal Highway.

==== East-West Industrial Corridor Highway (awaiting approval) ====
See East-West Industrial Corridor Highway in the foothills of Arunachal Pradesh from Bhairabkunda, the tri-junction of Bhutan, Assam and Arunachal Pradesh to Ruksin in East Siang district.

=== National connectivity (awaiting approval) ===
Arunachal Frontier Highway will also connect with the proposed Brahmaputra Expressway, running largely through Assam along the Brahmaputra River.

=== Inter-national connectivity (awaiting approval) ===
- BCIM Economic Corridor (BCIMEC) proposed by the Bangladesh-China-India-Myanmar Forum for Regional Cooperation (BCIM Forum) encompasses the Arunachal Frontier Highway. BCIMEC is a multi-mode corridor that includes a highway from Calcutta in India's West Bengal state to Kunming in China's Yunnan province. As well as Arunachal Pradesh, the highway passes through the Indian states of Manipur and Assam.

== Tourism ==
- Swadesh Darshan Tourist Circuits along the highways in Arunachal: In 2015 under the Swadesh Darshan Scheme, the Indian approved the funds to develop the following two tourist circuits in Arunachal Pradesh:
  - "Bhalukpong-Bomdila-Tawang Tourist Circuit" along the Arunachal Frontier Highway at the cost of ₹49.77 crore: The "facilities like accommodation, cafeteria, wayside amenities, last mile connectivity, pathways, toilet were built at Sorang Monastery, Lumpo, Zemithang, Bumla Pass, Gritsang, TSO lake, PTSO Lake, Thingbu and Grenkha Hot Spring, Lumla, Sela Lake." A multipurpose hall was built at Jang.
  - "Nafra-Seppa-Pappu-Pasa-Pakke Valleys-Sangdupota-New Sagalee-Ziro-Yomcha Tourist Circuit" along the Trans-Arunachal Highway at the cost of ₹97.14 crores: The "helipad, wayside amenities, trekking trails, rafting centre, log huts, craft bazaar, eco park, tourist facilitation centres, parking, multipurpose Hall, festival ground etc." were built.

== Current status ==
=== Main route and six inter-corridors ===
- 2014 Oct: Kiren Rijiju, Union Minister of State for Home Affairs stated that the BJP-led government sought to expedite this project, as well as the proposed East-West Industrial Corridor Highway, with the coordinated efforts of BRO, MinDef, Government of Arunachal Pradesh, MoRTH, DoNER and NSA.
- 2022 Nov-Dec: Construction already commenced on 192 km and the whole highway route notified as the National Highway NH-913. MoRTH announced that all approvals and land acquisition will be progressively completed by March 2025, and the construction will be progressively completed by March 2027 in the overlapping phases.
- 2023 May: All the DPR (detailed project reports) for the main route and the six inter-corridors, various approvals including environmental and forest, and land acquisition will be completed by March 2025, and construction will be completed in 2 years by March 2027.
- 2024 Feb: For the main route, the budget for nearly 500 km of the total 1,748 km has been approved after completion of DPR.
- 2025 Sep: Chief Engineer of Arunachal PWD stated that the revised target completion date is fy2028-29 (fiscal year ending on 31 March 2029). Various sections will open from 2027 and end-to-end connectivity will be ready by 2029.

=== Spurs ===
The status of spurs is as follows:

- 2025 Nov: approvals awaited.

== See also ==
Arunachal Pradesh connectivity projects

- Bhalukpong-Tawang railway, under-construction
- Arunachal East-West Corridor, across foothills of lower upper Arunachal Pradesh
- Trans-Arunachal Highway, exiting operational highway
- India-China Border Roads

Northeast connectivity projects

- Northeast Connectivity projects
- Look-East Connectivity projects
- North-South and East-West Corridor
- India-Myanmar-Thailand Friendship Highway
- BCIM Economic Corridor
- Asian Highway Network
- List of bridges on Brahmaputra River

National highways

- List of national highways in India
- National Highways Development Project
- Expressways of India
- Golden Quadrilateral (GQ)
