= List of airports in Arunachal Pradesh =

The Indian state of Arunachal Pradesh currently has four operational airports. The state also has a number of military airbases and airstrips that are used by the Indian Air Force. The state of Arunachal Pradesh received its first flight in 2018 when Alliance Air's first flight landed at Pasighat Airport from Guwahati. The second airport to get operationalised was Tezu Airport.

The proposed Itanagar Airport at Itanagar was scheduled to be inaugurated in October 2022 for commercial operations. There are plans to develop an airport at Tawang to increase tourism and increase security. Upgradation of existing airstrips under the Government of India's UDAN scheme is also proposed to increase tourism in Arunachal Pradesh and develop the state.

== List ==
The list includes the airports in the Indian state of Arunachal Pradesh with their respective ICAO and IATA codes.

List of airports in Arunachal Pradesh
Sl. no.	Location	Airport name	ICAO	IATA	Operator	Category	Role
1	Aalo	Along Airport	VEAN	IXV	Indian Air Force	Military airport	Defence
2	Daporijo	Daporijo Airport	VEDZ	DEP	Indian Air Force	Military airport	Defence
3	Itanagar	Itanagar Airport	VEHO	HGI	Airports Authority of India	Domestic airport	Commercial
4	Mechuka	Mechuka ALG	VEMK	none	Indian Air Force	Military airport	Defence
5	Pasighat	Pasighat Airport	VEPG	IXT	Airports Authority of India	Domestic airport	Commercial/defence
6	Tawang	Tawang AFS	none	none	Indian Air Force	Military airport	Defence
7	Tezu	Tezu Airport	VETJ	TEI	Airports Authority of India	Domestic airport	Commercial
8	Tuting	Tuting ALG	VETU	none	Indian Air Force	Military airport	Defence
9	Vijaynagar	Vijaynagar ALG	none	none	Indian Air Force	Military airport	Defence
10	Walong	Walong ALG	VEWL	none	Indian Air Force	Military airport	Defence
11	Ziro	Zero Airport	VEZO	ZER	Airports Authority of India	Domestic airport	Commercial/defence
