= Bishing =

- Village
- Location in Arunachal Pradesh, India Bishing (India)
- Coordinates: 29.1108°N 95.0268°E
- Country: India
- State: Arunachal Pradesh
- District: Upper Siang district

Population (2018)
  - Total: 100

Languages
  - Official: English
- Time zone: UTC+05:30 (IST)
- Vehicle registration: AR

Bishing is a border village in the Indian state of Arunachal Pradesh in the Upper Siang district, Gelling Circle. It is one of the northernmost populated places of the state, located on the Line of Actual Control with China. The Tsangpo River (Brahmaputra) enters India at Bishing, from where it is known as the "Siang River". Across the border in Tibet lies the Medog County with the Namcha Barwa mountain and the Tsangpo gorge.

== Geography ==
Bishing near the LAC

The Tsangpo River describes an S-shaped bend as it enters India. The Line of Actual Control (LAC) itself runs along the river in the middle of the bend. Bishing is at its lower right hand corner.

Bishing is 7 km by foot from the nearest village Gelling, and 33 km from Tuting, the nearest town. The nearest air connectivity is at the Tuting Advanced Landing Ground, but the village itself has a small helipad as of 2021.

The Government of Arunachal Pradesh has proposed to build a 150 km-long highway between Yingkiong and Bishing.

== Chinese incursions ==
Chinese incursions into the area have been reported in the press. In 2018, the president of the National People's Party issued a press release stating that China had constructed a two-kilometre long road in the region of Bishing. The Print published a report verifying the claim based on satellite imagery. The road was laid from the Tibetan temple called Degangsi, near the Delgon village (Chinese: 德尔贡村; pinyin: Dé'ěr gòng cūn), towards the Line of Actual Control. It had stretched 1 km into Indian territory according to the report. The Print opined that China was trying to create 'facts on the ground' to shift the border.

== Demographics ==
The village is home to around 100 people, mostly of the Memba tribe.

== See also ==
- North-East Frontier Agency
