= West Siang district =

Coordinates: 28°24′N 94°33′E

- District of Arunachal Pradesh
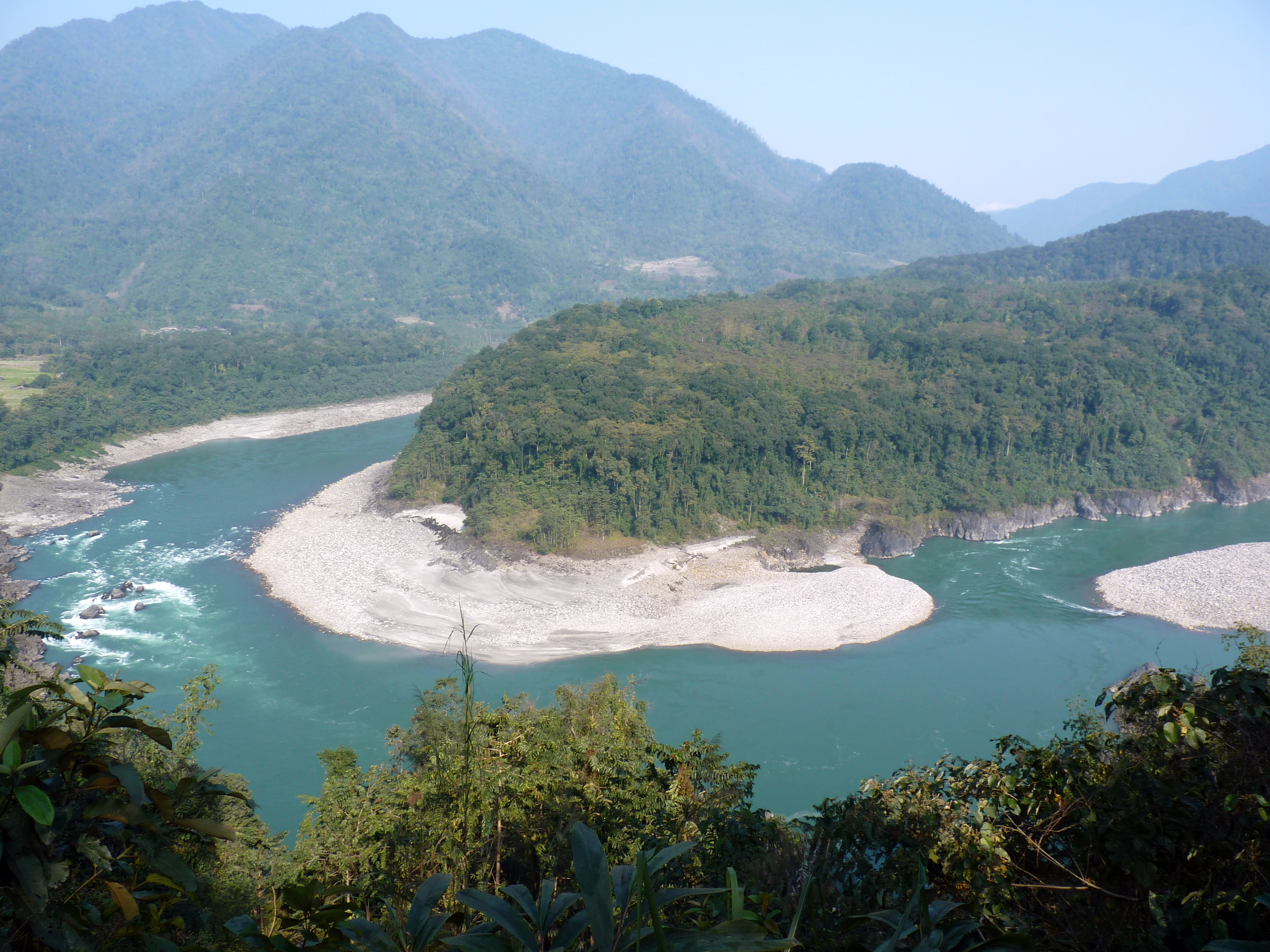
- Siyom River near Aalo
- West Siang district Location in Arunachal Pradesh
- Country: India
- State: Arunachal Pradesh
- Headquarters: Aalo

Population (2030)
  - Total: 200,000

Demographics
  - Literacy: 67.6%
  - Sex ratio: 916
- Time zone: UTC+05:30 (IST)
- Website: westsiang.nic.in

West Siang district (/ˈsjæŋ/ or /ˈsɪæŋ/) is an administrative district in the state of Arunachal Pradesh in India.

== History ==
In 1989, territory was given from West Siang to the East Siang district. Since 1999, this territory has been in the new Upper Siang district. West Siang was divided into Upper Siang and Lower Siang. West Siang district was bifurcated on 9 December 2018 when northern areas along China border were made a separate Shi Yomi district.

== Geography ==
The district headquarters is located at Aalo. West Siang district occupies an area of 8,325 square kilometres (3,214 sq mi), comparatively equivalent to Crete.

== Transport ==
The 2,000-kilometre-long (1,200 mi) proposed Mago-Thingbu to Vijaynagar Arunachal Pradesh Frontier Highway along the McMahon Line will intersect with the proposed East-West Industrial Corridor Highway and will pass through this district, alignment map of which can be seen here and here.

== Divisions ==
There are seven Arunachal Pradesh Legislative Assembly constituencies in this district: Liromoba, Likabali, Basar, Along West, Along East, Rumgong, and Mechuka. The first six are part of Arunachal West Lok Sabha constituency, while Mechuka is part of Arunachal East Lok Sabha constituency.

== Demographics ==
Historical population
Year	Pop.	±% p.a.
1961	42,222	—
1971	53,779	+2.45%
1981	68,320	+2.42%
1991	89,936	+2.79%
2001	103,918	+1.46%
2011	112,274	+0.78%

=== Population ===
According to the 2011 Census, West Siang district has a population of 112,274, roughly equal to the nation of Grenada. This gives it a ranking of 612th in India (out of a total of 640). The district has a population density of 13 inhabitants per square kilometre (34/sq mi). Its population growth rate over the decade 2001–2011 was 8.04%. West Siang has a sex ratio of 916 females for every 1000 males, and a literacy rate of 67.62%.

After bifurcation the residual West Siang district has a population of 58,182. Scheduled Tribes make up 46,204 (79.41%).

Religions in West Siang district (2011)
Religion	Per cent
Donyi-Polo	58.99%
Christianity	19.78%
Hinduism	17.25%
Islam	2.77%
Buddhism	0.81%
Other or not stated	0.40%

Languages of West Siang district (2011)
1. Adi (78.6%)
2. Hindi (6.91%)
3. Nepali (2.74%)
4. Bengali (2.25%)
5. Bhotia (2.06%)
6. Assamese (1.97%)
7. Nyishi (1.33%)
8. Others (4.10%)

Various tribal groups of the Galo, Memba, and Khamba tribes live in the district. The Galo generally follow Donyi-Polo, although some have embraced Baptist Christianity in recent years. The Memba and Khamba are followers of Tibetan Buddhism.

=== Languages ===
Languages spoken include Galo, a Sino-Tibetan tongue with approximately 140 000 speakers, written in Latin scripts; and Galo, an endangered language with 30 000 speakers, also in the Sino-Tibetan language family.

70.41% of the population spoke Galo, 6.65% Hindi, 3.18% Nepali, 2.75% Adi, 2.63% Bengali, 2.34% Assamese, 2.17% Bhojpuri and 1.68% Miniyong as their first language.

== Flora and fauna ==
The district is rich in wildlife. Rare mammals such as Mishmi takin, Snow leopards, Red pandas, and Musk deer occur while among birds there is the rare Blyth's Tragopan. A flying squirrel, new to science, has been recently discovered from this district. It has been named as Mechuka Giant Flying Squirrel.

In 1991, West Siang became home to the Kane Wildlife Sanctuary, which has an area of 55 km^{2} (21.2 mi^{2}).
