= Yordi Rabe Supse Wildlife Sanctuary =

Protected area in Arunachal Pradesh, India

- IUCN category IV (habitat/species management area)
- Location within Arunachal Pradesh Location within India
- Interactive map of Yordi Rabe Supse Wildlife Sanctuary
- Nearest city: Gelling
- Coordinates: 29°0′59″N 95°12′31″E
- Area: 397 km^{2} (153 sq mi)
- Elevation: 1,500 m (4,900 ft)–2,500 m (8,200 ft)
- Established: 1996

Yordi Rabe Supse Wildlife Sanctuary is a protected area and wildlife sanctuary located in West Siang district of the Indian state of Arunachal Pradesh. The sanctuary covers an area of 397 km^{2} (153 sq mi) and was declared as a protected area in 1996.

== Description ==
The protected area consists of a mixture of tropical, montane wet temperate and pine forests. Fauna found in the sanctuary include leopard, alpine musk deer, takin, Himalayan goral, Asiatic black bear, Indian wild dog, red panda, leopard cat, Himalayan serow, clouded leopard, spotted linsang, Eurasian otter, barking deer, sambar deer, Assamese macaque, capped langur, Hodgson's giant flying squirrel, and rufous-necked hornbill. Reptiles include the king cobra, Indian python, and reticulated python.

In 2026, the Musk deer was captured on camera for the first time in the sanctuary.
