= Along =

Along may refer to:

- Along, Arunachal Pradesh, a town in India
- Along Airport, an airport in the state of Arunachal Pradesh, India
- Along people, a Chinese ethnic group

== See also ==
- Hạ Long Bay, a UNESCO World Heritage Site and popular travel destination in Quảng Ninh Province, Vietnam; commonly called baie d'Along by Francophones
