= Singa, Arunachal Pradesh =

Village in Arunachal Pradesh, India

Singa
- Village
- Location in Arunachal Pradesh, India Singa (India)
- Coordinates: 28.82430°N 95.18217°E
- Country: India
- State: Arunachal Pradesh
- District: Upper Siang
- Time zone: UTC+5:30 (IST)
- PIN: 791105

Singa, also known as Singha, is a village in Arunachal Pradesh, India. It is located in Upper Siang district. The taluk is Tuting and pincode 791105. Singa is a remote settlement near the India-China border. It is reachable by the Arunachal Frontier Highway and the other India–China Border Roads (ICBRs).

== Terrain and tourism ==
The mountainous terrain around Singa has attracted tourism. Along with nearby Gelling and Tuting, Singa forms the Pemakod triangle. It has been described as an important stop on the Buddhism pilgrimage and tourism circuit.

Pemakod (literally "hidden land"), also known as Danakosa Lake, is considered a sacred and hidden region Arunachal Pradesh with great significance in Tibetan Buddhism, where Padmasambhava (lit. "Born from a Lotus", also known as Guru Rinpoche, i.e. Precious Guru) meditated who wrote that Pemakod s the king of 16 hidden lands listed by him. Guru Padmasambhava cherished Pemakod, stating that practice in this land is highly effective for revealing the pure nature of one's mind. The geography of Pemakod resembles the different parts of dakini (goddess often associated with one of the six chakras or the seven fundamental ayurvedic elements (dhātu) of the human body) Vajravarahi's body, mainly in five chakras. Pemakod’s geography resembles the dakini Vajravarahi, lying on her back in which lama Tulku Urgyen Rinpoche's retreat land and Zangdok Palri Temple are located and considered the secret chakra of Vajravarahi’s body, as recorded by the author Ian Baker in his 2006 book "Heart of the World: A Journey to Tibet’s Lost Paradise" after third successful trip to Pemakod. Guru Padmasambhava's pureland paradise is Zangdok Palri (lit. "the Copper-Coloured Mountain"). It is one of the 16 hidden lands of Rūpaloka (world of form) plain of the Buddhist cosmology. The phrase "hidden land" has three secret meanings, implying the ultimate nature of mind, a gathering place for yogis and yoginis, and a place blessed by Guru Padmasambhava with numerous treasures. Chief Minister of Arunachal Pradesh, Pema Khandu, announced the inclusion of the Gelling-Tuting-Singha triangle, forming the Pemako Zone, in the Buddhism tourism circuit to attract more tourists.

This Pamakod area has 4 major and several minor sacred sites. Among the major sites considered sacred in Tibetan Buddhism are the "Devi Kota", "Padma Shri", "Riwo Tala", and "Citta Puri":

- "Devi Kota": centered between the other three, it embodies the blessings of all three, hence it is most sacred site among the four.
- "Padma Shri": It is the scared site of the Dharmakaya Amitabha who is one of the main Buddhas of Mahayana Buddhism and the most widely venerated Buddhist figure in East Asian Buddhism).
- "Riwo Tala": It is the scared site of Samboghakaya Avalokiteśvara. The Samboghakaya (lit. "body of enjoyment") is one of 3 forms of Buddha, and the Avalokiteśvara (lit. "the Lord of the World" or Chenrezig in Tibetan language) is a tenth-level bodhisattva associated with great compassion (mahakaruṇā).
- "Citta Puri": It is the sacred site of Nirmāṇakāya Guru Padmasambhava. The Nirmāṇakāya (lit. "formation of physical body") is the third aspect of the trikāya and the physical manifestation of a Buddha in time and space.

== See also ==
- Vibrant Village Program (VVP), in India for border villages
