= Akshiganga =

Town in Arunachal Pradesh, India

Akshiganga is a small town in the West Siang district in the Indian state of Arunachal Pradesh.
