= Keyi Panyor district =

- District of Arunachal Pradesh
- Country: India
- State: Arunachal Pradesh
- Established: 1 March 2024

Population (2011)
  - Total: 30,000
- Time zone: UTC+05:30 (IST)
- Vehicle registration: AR
- Website: https://igod.gov.in/district/mqv7UpQB15Llg5edj1we/sub_districts

Keyi Panyor district is one of the 28 districts of Arunachal Pradesh state in northeastern India. Yachuli is its headquarters.

== History ==
In December 2022, the All Yachuli Student Union (AYSU) demanded creation of Keyi Panyor district, by bifurcating the then existing Lower Subansiri district. In September 2023, the Arunachal Pradesh Chief Minister Pema Khandu announced creation of district. And in February 2024, the cabinet approved the bill for district creation. It was formed by carved out 195 villages from Lower Subansiri district. In March 1, 2024, the district was officially inaugurated.

== Demographics ==
The district is populated mainly by the Nyishi people. It has a population of over 30,000 and includes 195 villages.

== Divisions ==
The district is represented by the Yachuli Assembly constituency in the Arunachal Pradesh Legislative Assembly. The district is part of Arunachal West Lok Sabha constituency.
