= Tuting Advanced Landing Ground =

Indian Air Force airstrip

Tuting Advanced Landing Ground
- IATA: none; ICAO: VETU

Summary
- Airport type: Military
- Owner/Operator: Indian Air Force
- Location: Tuting, Upper Siang, Arunachal Pradesh, India
- Coordinates: 28.99°N 94.89°E

Map
- Location in Arunachal Pradesh Location in India

Runways
Direction	Length		Surface
Direction	ft	m	Surface
03/21	4,134	1,260	Asphalt

Tuting Advanced Landing Ground is an Indian Air Force airstrip located at Tuting in Upper Siang district of Arunachal Pradesh, India on the banks of River Siang. NH-913 Arunachal Frontier Highway will pass through Jido suburb of Tuting immediately south of the airstrip.

== History ==
The airstrip was used during 1962 Indo-China War and was abandoned later. In 2008 plan to review the airstrip was approved and in 2016 the airstrip was reviewed with new runway and allied facilities as an Indian Airforce Advanced Landing Ground. The airstrip is used for bring in vital supplies from Assam via aircraft and helicopters.

== See also ==
- Indo-China Border Roads
- List of Indian Air Force stations
- Sino-Indian border dispute
