= Dibang River Bridge =

Bridge in Arunachal Pradesh, India

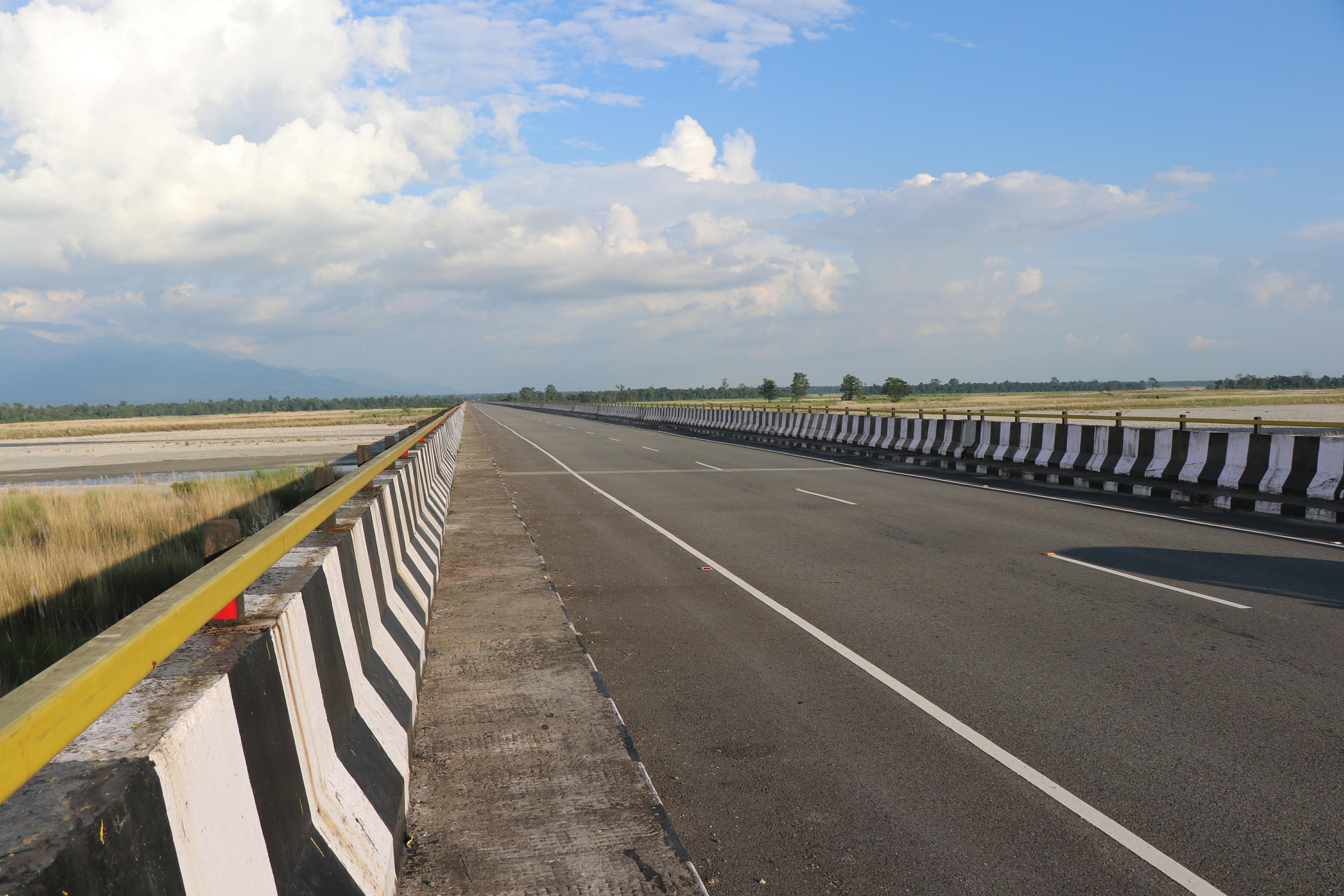
- View from the middle of the bridge
- Coordinates: 28°08′47″N 95°42′11″E
- Carries: Road (NH 13)
- Crosses: Dibang River
- Locale: Bomjir - Malek area

Characteristics
- Total length: 6,200 metres (20,300 ft)
- Longest span: 200 metres (660 ft)

History
- Constructed by: Navayuga Engineering
- Construction start: April 2013
- Opened: 2018

Location
- Interactive map of Dibang River Bridge

The Dibang River Bridge is a beam bridge across Dibang River which connects Bomjir and Malek villages and provides all-weather connectivity between Dambuk and Roing in eastern part of Arunachal Pradesh, India. At 6.2 km (3.9 mi) long, it is the third-longest bridge above water in India and was completed in 2018 as part of NH13 Trans-Arunachal Highway. This strategically important bridge helps Indian military combat anti-national activities and Chinese military threat in the Easter sector of Line of Actual Control border areas. It is known as "Sikang" in Adi Language and "Talon" in Idu Mishmi language.

== History ==
In 2010, the Union Cabinet Committee on Infrastructure approved the project for construction of bridges across the Sikang river system and connecting road between Bomjir-Meka on NH-52, covering a length of 18.950 km. NH-52 has been renumbered as National Highway 13 which is also known as Trans-Arunachal Highway. Expenditure on the project was incurred out of Ministry of Development of North Eastern Region's budget allocations for Special Accelerated Road Development Programme for North Eastern Region. The 750 crore rupees project has seen disruptions due to resistance from locals. In 2018, it became operational after construction completion and testing.

== Location ==
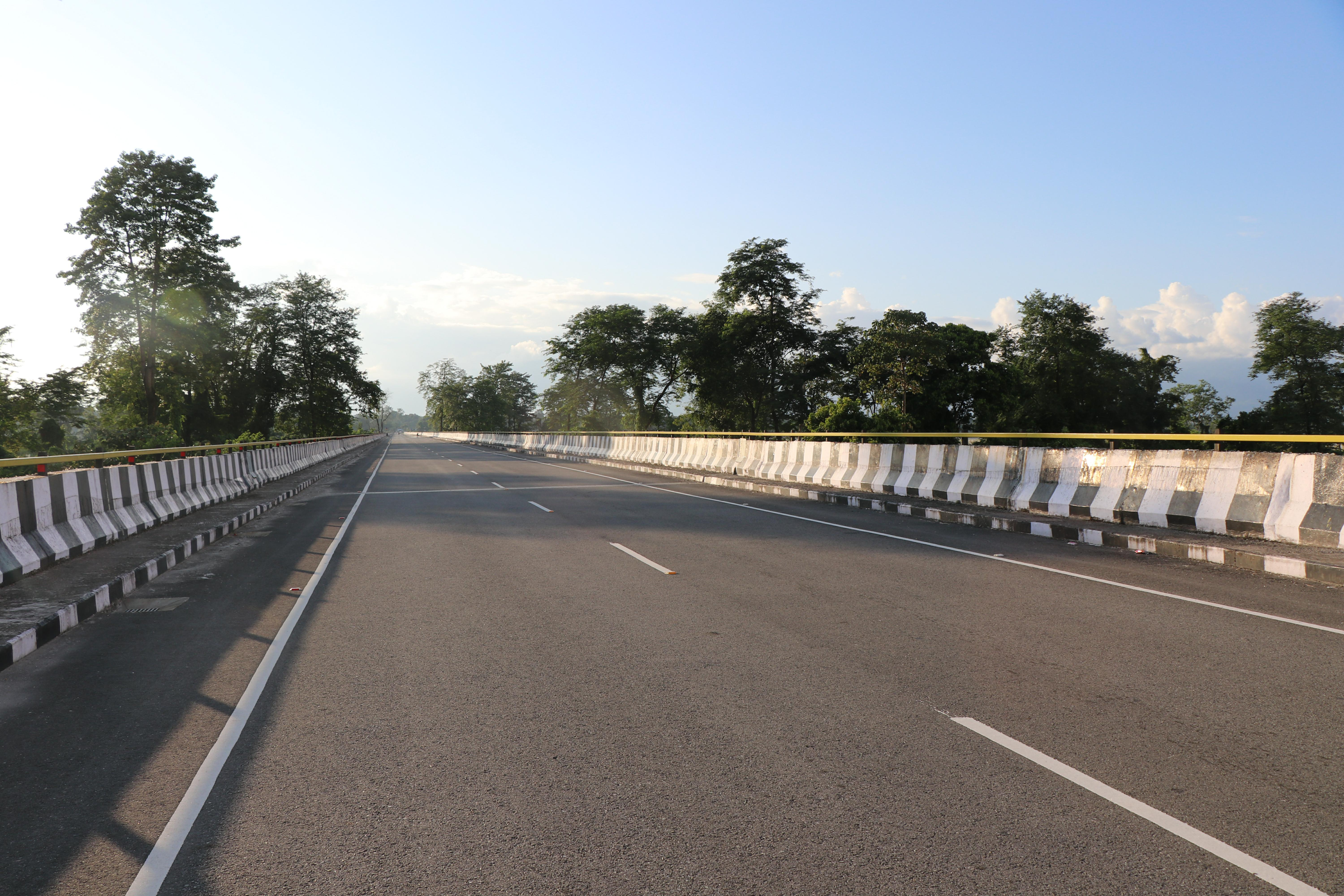
The Bridge, which passes over many Islets, was completed in 2018.

This bridge spans across Sikang river system in Arunachal Pradesh. It is located in Lower Dibang Valley district of Arunachal Pradesh.

== See also ==
- Bhupen Hazarika Setu
- List of longest bridges above water in India
- Trans-Arunachal Highway
