= Khamba people =

Ethnic group in Arunachal Pradesh, northeast India

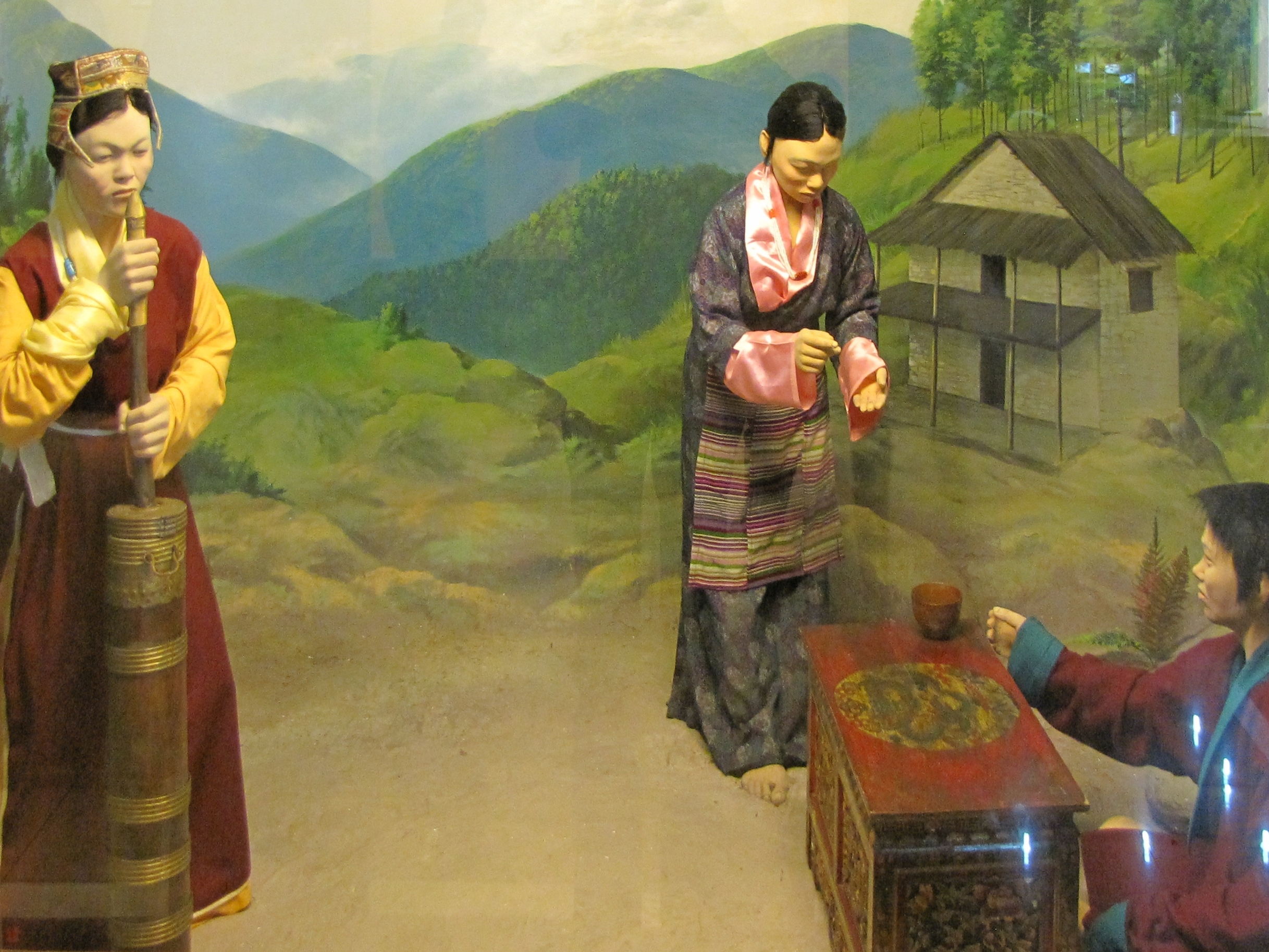
Diorama and wax figures of Khamba people in Jawaharlal Nehru Museum, Itanagar.

The Khamba or Khemba, are a people who inhabit the Yang-Sang-Chu valley of Arunachal Pradesh, near the borders with Tibet and China. Within the valley, they live in the villages Yorton, Lango, Tashigong, Nyukong and Mangkota.

The Khamba are adherents of Tibetan Buddhism and use Hingna, their own script, which is based on the Tibetan script. However, due to relative isolation from Tibet and occasional contacts with the Adi tribes, they are also somewhat influenced by the Donyi-Polo faith in their beliefs. In every village there will be a Buddhist Lama. Festivals that are celebrated are parallel with the Memba, which includes Losar, the Tibetan New Year.

== Lifestyle ==
Wheat and maize are principal crops cultivated by the Khamba. Their houses, which are made from stone and wood, are based on a structure that strongly resembles the Monpa.
