= Tuting =

Tuting Pekong
- Town
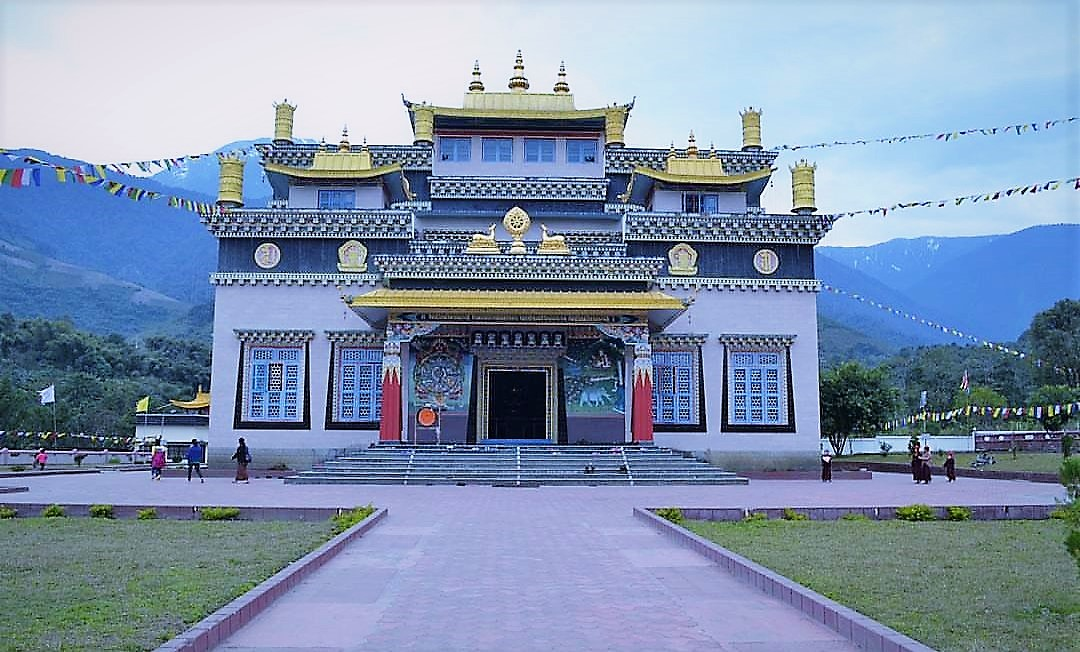
- Tuting monastery

- Location in Arunachal Pradesh, India Tuting (India)
- Coordinates: 28.992185°N 94.894697°E
- Country: India
- State: Arunachal Pradesh
- District: Upper Siang district
- Elevation: 1,240 m (4,070 ft)

Languages
  - Official: Hindi, English
- Time zone: UTC+05:30 (IST)
- ISO 3166 code: IN-AR
- Vehicle registration: AR

Tuting near the McMahon Line

Tuting is a town and headquarters of an eponymous circle in the Upper Siang district in Arunachal Pradesh, India. It is situated on the bank of Siang river (Brahmaputra) at a distance of 34 km (21 mi) south of Line of Actual Control and 170 km (110 mi) north of Yingkiong. Tuting is the center of an assembly constituency, and also home to an Indian Military headquarters. The border area reports frequent incursion attempts by the Chinese People's Liberation Army, including an attempt to construct a road in Indian territory.

== Location ==
Gelling is located on the 2,000-kilometre-long (1,200 mi) proposed Mago-Thingbu to Vijaynagar Arunachal Pradesh Frontier Highway along the McMahon Line, alignment map of which can be seen here and here. Around 35 km (22 mi) upstream is Gelling, the last India village before the Indo-Tibet border. Tsangpo river (Brahmaputra) enters here from Tibet and natives know it as the Tsang Chu, downstream of here it is called the Siang river and Bramhaputra in Assam.

== Administration ==
Tuting-Yingkiong is one of the Arunachal Pradesh Legislative Assembly. Tuting town is under the administration of an (ADC) Additional Deputy Commissioner. Tuting town is the head office of the ADC.

== Culture ==
Tuting is populated by Adi tribe who are the indigenous inhabitants but small population of other neighbouring tribes like Memba and Khamba are also settled in this town nowadays.

In Gelling circle in northern reaches of Tuting, Memba people are indigenous tribe who follow Nyingma Mahayana Buddhism whose key festivals of Losar, Torgya, Dhruba and Tsobum are celebrated by performing Bardo Chham animal-mask folk dance at gonpas.

== Tourism ==
Gelling, with three-hour foot track to Indo-China border, is a tourist attraction which has Dampo Tso lake, 300-foot (91 m) tall Sibe-Re waterfall at Bishing, remnants of now defunct Kapangla Pass between Tibet and India, and Inspection Bungalow at Gelling for stay. Trekking and scenery.

== Transport ==
=== Highway ===
Tuting is connected to Yingkiong and Pasighat in the south and until ITBF office at Gelling in the north on the LAC via the Pasighat-Aalo-Tuting-Gelling strategic India-China Border Roads.

=== Tuting Airport ===
Tuting AGL is an Advanced Landing Ground airstrip of Indian Airforce.

== Map ==
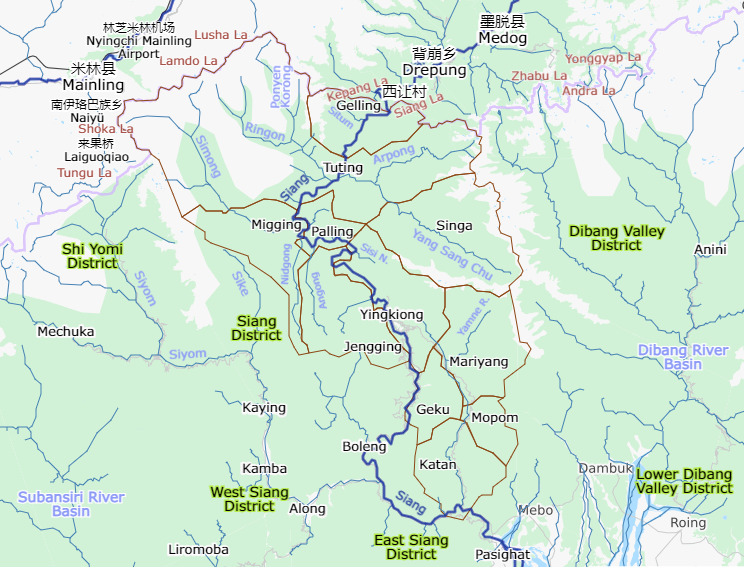
Upper Siang district with Tuting circle and Tuting

== See also ==
- North-East Frontier Agency
- List of people from Arunachal Pradesh
- Religion in Arunachal Pradesh
- Cuisine of Arunachal Pradesh
- List of institutions of higher education in Arunachal Pradesh
- Yingkiong
