= Along Airport =

Airport of Arunachal Pradesh, India

- IATA: IXV; ICAO: VEAN

Summary
- Airport type: Military
- Operator: Indian Air Force
- Serves: Along, Arunachal Pradesh
- Elevation AMSL: 274 m (899 ft)
- Coordinates: 28°10′31″N 094°48′07″E

Map
- Location within Arunachal Pradesh Location within India

Runways
Direction	Length		Surface
Direction	m	ft	Surface
05/23	1,120	3,675	Asphalt

Along Airport (IATA: IXV, ICAO: VEAN) also known as Aalo Airport is located at Along in the state of Arunachal Pradesh, India.

The Government of Arunachal Pradesh handed over the airstrip to the Ministry of Defence in June 2009. The government has proposed to operationalise a civil enclave at the airport.

The Airports Authority of India (AAI) had sent a report to the state government and the Indian Air Force in July 2011 for the removal of obstacles around the aerodrome for safe flight operations and cited a requirement of seven acres of land for the development of the civil enclave.

== Incidents ==
On 7 April 1964, a Kalinga Airlines Dakota overshot the runway and caught fire. No casualties were reported in this incident, but the aircraft was damaged beyond economic repair.
