= Raga, Arunachal Pradesh =

Raga
- Raga
- Interactive map of Raga
- Coordinates: 27°47′59.063″N 94°4′28.963″E
- Country: India
- State: Arunachal Pradesh
- Distrcit: Kamle
- Pincode(s): 791122

Raga is a Tehsil in the Indian state of Arunachal Pradesh. It is part of Kamle district. In October 2017 the state government approved the creation of Kamle district, with its headquarters in Raga.

Raga is located 44 km towards north from Ziro. It is 100 km from the State capital Itanagar towards the south. It is one of the 60 constituencies of Legislative Assembly of Arunachal Pradesh.

== Demographics ==
The population of the city of Raga at the 2011 census was 1,281, and the encompassing administrative circle, "Raga Circle", had a population of over 5,000.

== See also ==
- List of constituencies of Arunachal Pradesh Legislative Assembly
- Arunachal Pradesh Legislative Assembly
- Raga Assembly constituency
