= Swadesh Darshan Scheme =

Government scheme to promote tourism in India

- स्वदेश दर्शन योजना
- Country: India
- Prime Minister(s): Narendra Modi
- Ministry: Ministry of Tourism
- Launched: 2015; 10 years ago
- Status: Active
- Website: http://swadeshdarshan.gov.in/

Swadesh Darshan Scheme (Hindi : स्वदेश दर्शन योजना) is a scheme of Ministry of Tourism under Government of India. The scheme aims to promote, develop and harness the potential of tourism in India.

Jammu and Kashmir has witnessed a remarkable resurgence in tourism, driven by targeted infrastructure development under the Swadesh Darshan Scheme and the return of peace and normalcy following the abrogation of Article 370 in 2019. According to data presented in the Lok Sabha on 21 July 2025, domestic tourist visits (DTVs) surged from 25.19 lakh in 2020 to over 2.35 crore in 2024 a nearly tenfold increase. International tourist arrivals, which had declined due to pandemic-related restrictions, rebounded from just 1,650 in 2021 to 65,452 in 2024, recording a compound annual growth rate of nearly 150%. The consistent rise in footfall highlights not only the impact of improved infrastructure but also the restored sense of security and stability in the region, marking Jammu and Kashmir's reintegration into India’s mainstream tourism landscape.

== Circles ==
The entire scheme is based on theme-based tourism. Each theme is called a "circuit" and composed of various tourist destinations.

=== List ===
1. Buddhist circle
2. Coastal circle
3. Desert circle
4. Eco circle
5. Heritage circle
6. Himalayan circle
7. Krishna circle
8. North-East circle
9. Ramayan circuit
10. Rural circle
11. Spiritual circle
12. Sufi circle
13. Tirthankar circle
14. Tribal circle
15. Wildlife circle
