= BCIM Economic Corridor =

Belt and Road Initiative infrastructure project

China Members of the Asian Infrastructure Investment Bank The six Belt and Road corridors Maritime silk road China in red, Members of the Asian Infrastructure Investment Bank in orange, the six corridors in black

The Bangladesh, China, India and Myanmar Economic Corridor (BCIM) was a proposed road, rail, water, and air link connecting India and China through Myanmar and Bangladesh as a corridor.

In 2015, China proposed including the corridor as part of its vision for the Belt and Road Initiative, China's signature global connectivity initiative. The BRI was boycotted by India from the start. In May 2019, the BCIM was not mentioned in a list of 35 corridors and projects in a joint communique issued by state leaders attending the 2nd Belt and Road Forum, indicating the BCIM had been dropped from the BRI. In the same year, India has sought to keep the BCIM intact by sending a delegation to the 13th BCIM Forum in Yuxi, noting, however, that the corridor predates the BRI. Ultimately, the corridor was abandoned due to BCIM's ties to the Belt and Road and the sharp deterioration in Sino-Indian relations.

The proposed corridor will cover 1.65 million square kilometres, encompassing an estimated 440 million people in China's Yunnan province, Bangladesh, Myanmar, and West Bengal in Eastern India through the combination of road, rail, water, and air linkages in the region. The BCIM envisages greater market access for goods, services, and energy; elimination of non-tariff barriers; better trade facilitation; investment in infrastructure development; and joint exploration and development of mineral, water, and other natural resources.

== History ==
=== Background ===
The concept of economic cooperation within the BCIM region was first developed by Rehman Sobhan, who advocated that multi-modal transport connectivity supported by other initiatives and infrastructure development could significantly reduce transaction costs, stimulate trade and investment, and consequently accelerate growth and poverty alleviation in this region.

Sobhan's pioneering ideas would eventually lead to the development of the platform in the 1990s, which came to be known as the "Kunming Initiative". The first meeting of the Initiative was convened in 1999 in Kunming. It was presided over by a number of representative organisations such as the Centre for Policy Dialogue (CPD) from Bangladesh, the Centre for Policy Research (CPR) from India and the Yunnan Academy of Social Sciences in Kunming, China; from the Myanmar side, it was the Ministry of Trade that represented the country.

The Kunming Initiative evolved into the BCIM Forum for Regional Cooperation during its first with the objective to create a platform where major stakeholders could meet and discuss issues in the context of promoting economic growth and trade in the BCIM region; identify specific sectors and projects that would promote greater collaboration among the BCIM nations; and strengthen cooperation and institutional arrangements among the concerned key players and stakeholders to deepen BCIM ties.

Over the years, the Kunming initiative developed into what came to be popularly known as the BCIM Forum. Successive BCIM Forums were held annually, making a seminal contribution in raising awareness about the potential benefits accruing from the BCIM cooperation. BCIM cooperation also started to feature in intergovernmental discussions at the highest political levels, as was recounted above. The initial vision of the Kunming initiative was to gradually steer the endeavour from an essentially civil society (Track II) to an intergovernmental (Track I) one where political buy-in and intergovernmental ownership would be key to realising the vision and the objectives of the initiative.

=== Initial steps ===
One of the most recent developments to the BCIM came to fruition during the meeting between Chinese Premier Li Keqiang and Indian Prime Minister Manmohan Singh in 2013. Li's visit marked the first time high-ranking officials had discussed the trade corridor. Furthermore, earlier in the year, the first-ever BCIM car rally was held between Kolkata and Kunming via Dhaka to highlight road connectivity in the four countries.

On 18 December 2013, the four nations drew up a long-discussed plan, emphasizing the need to quickly improve physical connectivity in the region, over two days of talks in the south-western Chinese city of Kunming – the provincial capital of Yunnan, which borders Myanmar. This marked the formal endorsement of the BCIM EC by the four nations, whereby it was agreed that the corridor would run from Kunming to Kolkata, linking Mandalay in Myanmar as well as Dhaka and Chittagong in Bangladesh.

The deepwater port being enhanced at Kyaukphyu, Myanmar, is viewed as a gateway to the Bangladesh-China-India-Myanmar (BCIM) Economic Corridor.

== Economic advantages ==
The economic advantages of the BCIM trade corridor are considerable, most notably: access to numerous markets in Southeast Asia, improvement of transportation infrastructure, and creation of industrial zones.

The construction of industrial zones will have a twofold benefit. Firstly, it will lead to industrial transfer, boosting industries such as processing, manufacturing, and commerce logistics. Secondly, as labour costs rise in China, labour-intensive industries such as textile and agro-processing will eventually be shifted out of China. These industries will need to be transferred to new regions with lower labour costs. Companies operating in China will likely give priority to the trade corridor region given its established infrastructure, improved logistics, and ease of access.

India's isolated eastern and north-eastern states also stand to gain by higher trade and connectivity with China and the rest of Asia.

== Priority sector ==
The eleven BCIM Forums, organised in rotation by the aforesaid institutions in the four countries, have highlighted the potential benefits of closer cooperation among the four countries in such areas as connectivity, trade, investment, energy, water management, tourism, and other areas. The four countries also agreed to encourage greater cooperation and exchanges in the BCIM region in the areas of education, sports, and science and technology.

== Leadership and representation ==
Bangladesh–China–India–Myanmar Forum for Regional Cooperation
- Official languages: English
- Membership: Bangladesh; China; India; Myanmar

Leaders

The Bangladesh–China–India–Myanmar Forum for Regional Cooperation (BCIM) is a sub-regional organisation of Asian nations aimed at greater integration of trade and investment between the four countries, and the economic corridor has grown out of it.

During the last held session in 2013, India was represented at this week's talks by Joint Secretary (East Asia) at the Ministry of External Affairs Gautam Bambawale, who was joined by the deputy planning minister of Bangladesh, the vice chairman of China's National Development and Reform Commission, and a senior economic affairs official from Myanmar.

== Cooperation with other corridors ==
Through linking the ASEAN Free Trade Area, ASEAN–China Free Trade Area, and the ASEAN–India Free Trade Area, the corridor would constitute one of the largest free trade areas. Bangladesh, China, India, and Myanmar hope to create a corridor that would effectively combine road, rail, water, and air linkages in the region. This will also improve foreign trade of the BCIM countries and empower bilateral trading.

== See also ==
- Malacca dilemma
- China–Pakistan Economic Corridor
- India's International connectivity projects
