= Gelling, Arunachal Pradesh =

Gelling
- Village and administrative circle
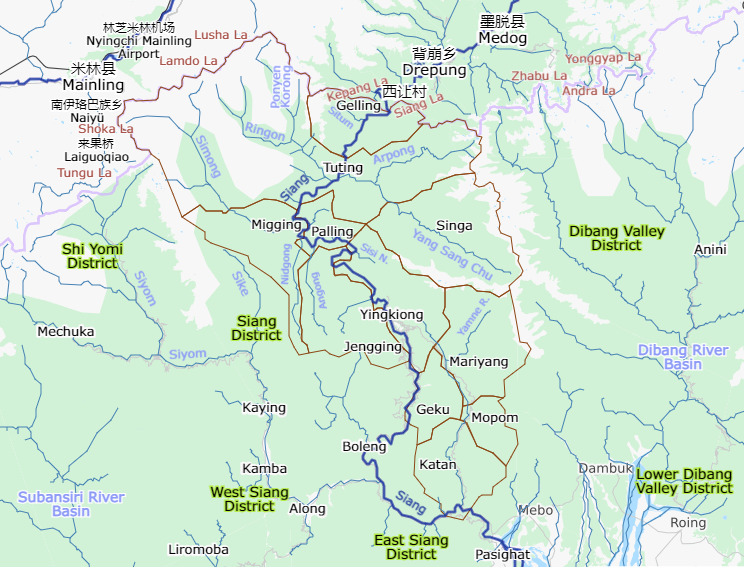
- Gelling Circle in the Upper Siang district

- Gelling village in Arunachal Pradesh, India Gelling (India)
- Coordinates: 29°08′04″N 94°58′39″E
- Country: India
- State: Arunachal Pradesh
- District: Upper Siang district
- Sub-division: Tuting

Gelling, Arunachal Pradesh
- Simplified Chinese: 更仁
Transcriptions
Standard Mandarin
- Hanyu Pinyin: Gèng rén

Gelling, or Geling, is a village and the headquarters of an eponymous circle in the Upper Siang district in the Indian state of Arunachal Pradesh. The Brahmaputra River (called "Siang" in Arunachal Pradesh) enters India near Gelling. Gelling village is located around 35 km upstream from Tuting.

The Gelling Circle contains the basin of the Siang river on both the sides, on the border of the Medog County of China's Tibet Autonomous Region. It has a population of 742 people living in six villages. The other villages in the Circle are Bishing, Bona, Kopu, Mayum and Norbudling. The Geling Circle along with the Singa Circle is organised as a community development block with 19 villages in total.
