= Sagalee =

- Town
- Location in Arunachal Pradesh, India Sagalee (India)
- Coordinates: 27.1672°N 93.7431°E
- Country: India
- State: Arunachal Pradesh

Languages
  - Official: English
- Time zone: UTC+5:30 (IST)
- Vehicle registration: AR
- Climate: Cwa

Sagalee is a town and the administrative headquarters of Sagalee Circle in Papum Pare district in the Indian state of Arunachal Pradesh.

It is located approximately 70 km from the district headquarters at Yupia and about 82 km from the state capital, Itanagar. Sagalee lies along the Trans-Arunachal Highway (National Highway 13) and also lends its name to the Sagalee Legislative Assembly constituency (Constituency No. 15). According to the 2011 Census of India, Sagalee town had a population of 1,315, while the larger Sagalee Circle recorded a population of 6,049.

The area is characterized by mixed hill slopes, agricultural plots, and patches of forest consistent with Papum Pare landscapes.

== Etymology ==
Sagalee was originally called “Sagyariang” in aya in Nyishi dialect by the local inhabitants; however, due to phonetic pronunciation difficulties, people from outside the state gradually began referring to it as “Sagalee” for ease of pronunciation.

== Administration and politics ==
- Sagalee is the administrative centre of Sagalee Circle (an ADC / Circle in Papum Pare district). The Sagalee Assembly constituency is reserved for Scheduled Tribes (ST) and is part of the Arunachal West (Lok Sabha) seat. As of the 2024 state election, the MLA is Ratu Techi.

== Demographics ==
- Town population (2011): 1,315 (Sagalee Notified Town). Literacy in the town (2011) was reported as 85.77%; male literacy ~90.8% and female literacy ~80.7%. Child (0–6) population was 212 (≈16.1% of town population). Female sex ratio and child sex ratio figures for the town are reported in the census-derived summaries.
- Sagalee Circle (2011): total population approx. 6,049 (1,077 families). The Circle includes multiple villages in addition to the notified town.

Languages: Officially, English is the state official language; locally the Nyishi language and other tribal dialects are commonly spoken in Papum Pare and Sagalee area.

== Economy ==
- The local economy is primarily agrarian and subsistence-oriented (paddy, vegetables, small-scale horticulture), with some trade and services centered on the town and NH-13 traffic. There is no evidence of significant industrial activity in reliable sources I could find online; the town functions primarily as an administrative and market node for surrounding villages.

== Transport ==
- Road: Sagalee is located on the Trans-Arunachal Highway / NH-13 corridor (the highway route documentation and NH-13 articles list “Sagalee/Sagalie” along the route). NH-13 provides the main road link to Itanagar, Doimukh, Seppa and other parts of Arunachal. Local reports also reference NH-13 being blocked at points near Sagalee during heavy rains — supporting that the NH is the main route.
- Nearest major rail/air links: The closest major railway station is a Naharlagun Railway Station which has intercity Trains to few staionations in Assam With major Stoppage at Guwahati and few Border Station of Nagaland;
- The Nearest Airports is Doni Polo Airport Itanagar which is 101 km from sagalee which is
- Guwahati is the major city most commonly relied upon for rail and air connectivity, apart from the state’s internal transport network.

== Education and health ==
- The town serves as a local centre for primary and secondary education for nearby villages; district education listings and local school directories typically list government and private schools in Sagalee Circle. A CHC ( Community Health centre) is present in sagalee town.

== Culture and festivals ==
- The area is inhabited predominantly by Nyishi and related tribal communities; festivals such as Nyokum are widely celebrated in the district and in neighbouring areas. Traditional customs, houses, and craftwork of the Nyishi are culturally important. Local tourism pages for the Doimukh–Sagalee circuit describe cultural attractions and Nyishi traditions.

== See also ==
- List of constituencies of Arunachal Pradesh Legislative Assembly
- Arunachal Pradesh Legislative Assembly
