= Upper Siang district =

- District of Arunachal Pradesh
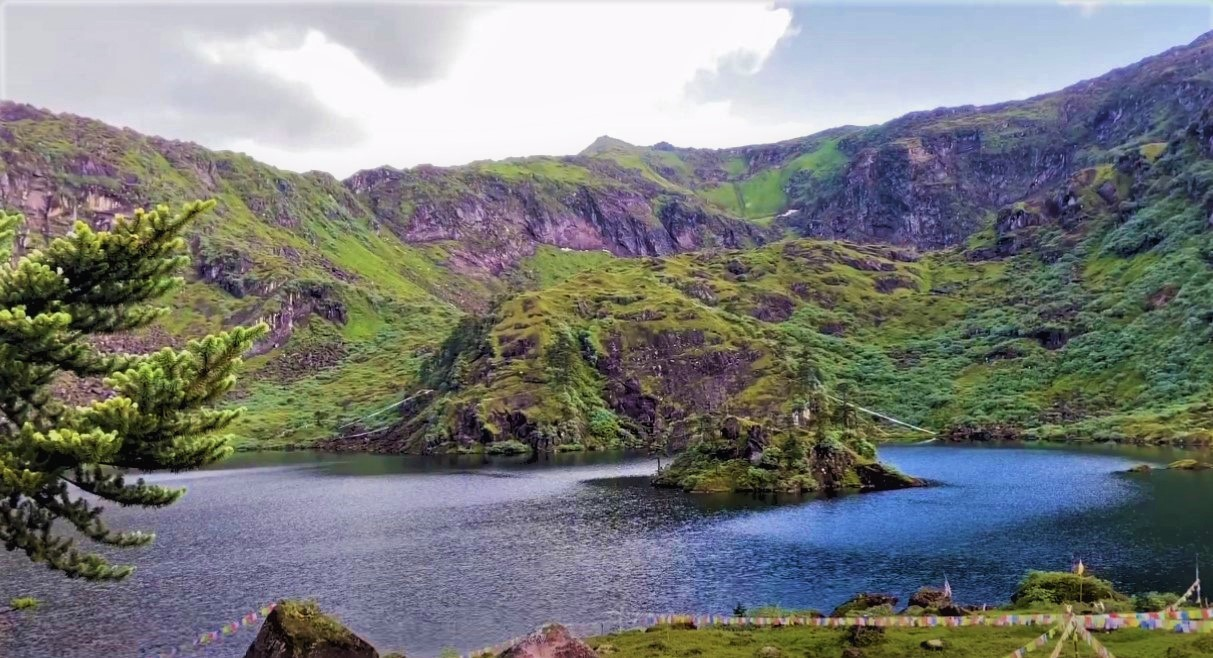
- Tsitapuri lake
- Upper Siang district Location in Arunachal Pradesh
- Coordinates (Yingkiong): 28.61037°N 95.047531°E
- Country: India
- State: Arunachal Pradesh
- Headquarters: Yingkiong

Area
  - Total: 6,188 km^{2} (2,389 sq mi)

Population (2011)
  - Total: 35,320
  - Density: 5.708/km^{2} (14.78/sq mi)

Demographics
  - Literacy: 60.0%
  - Sex ratio: 891
- Time zone: UTC+05:30 (IST)
- Website: uppersiang.nic.in

Upper Siang district (/ˈsjæŋ/ or /ˈsɪæŋ/) is an administrative district in the state of Arunachal Pradesh in India. It is the fourth least populous district in the country (out of 640).

== History ==
The majority of the people are of the Adi tribe while the Memba, Khamba tribe also exists there. Part of the area was controlled by the Tibetan Kingdom of Powo when streams of Tibetan pilgrims searching for one of the 'hidden lands' or beyul (Standard Tibetan: sbas-yul) referred to in the prophecies of Guru Rinpoche in the East Himalayas from the mid-seventeenth century came south over the Doshong La pass, to seek the particular location of one of these earthly paradises called Padma bkod (written variously Pema köd, Pemakö and Pemako), literally 'Lotus Array' in the region. The region became administered by British India with the Simla Accord of 1914 and the demarcation of the McMahon Line, though China considers it part of South Tibet.

The district was formed in 1999 when it was split from East Siang district.

== Geography ==
The district headquarters are located at Yingkiong. Upper Siang district occupies an area of 6,118 square kilometres (2,362 sq mi),

The district is the location of the massive Upper Siang Hydroelectric Project.

== Transport ==
The 2,000-kilometre-long (1,200 mi) proposed Mago-Thingbu to Vijaynagar Arunachal Pradesh Frontier Highway along the McMahon Line, (will intersect with the proposed East-West Industrial Corridor Highway) and will pass through this district, alignment map of which can be seen here and here.

== Divisions ==
There are two Arunachal Pradesh Legislative Assembly constituencies in this district: Tuting-Yingkiong and Mariyang-Geku. Both are part of Arunachal East Lok Sabha constituency.

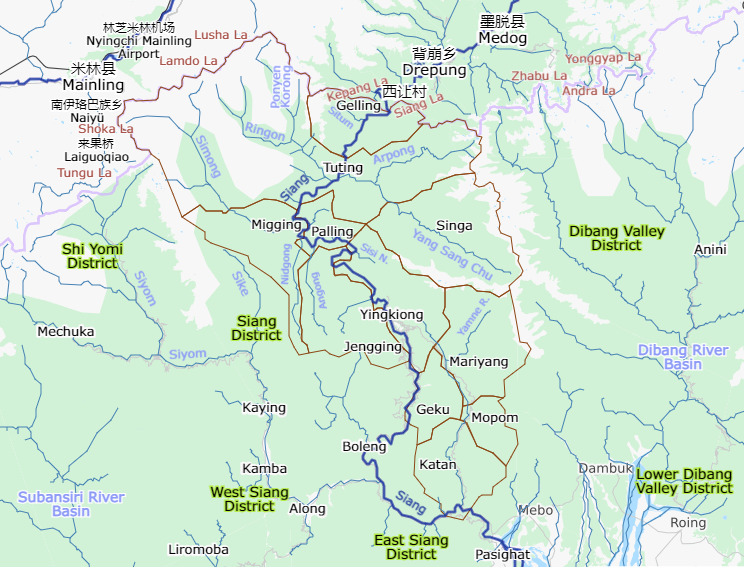
Upper Siang district with administrative circles

Administrative circles include Yingkiong, Jengging, Mariyang, Geku, Katan, Mopom, Tuting, Gelling, Singa, Palling, Migging.

== Demographics ==
Historical population
Year	Pop.	±% p.a.
1961	9,790	—
1971	21,330	+8.10%
1981	21,125	−0.10%
1991	27,779	+2.78%
2001	33,363	+1.85%
2011	35,320	+0.57%

According to the 2011 census Upper Siang district has a population of 35,320, roughly equal to the nation of Liechtenstein. This gives it a ranking of 637th in India (out of a total of 640). The district has a population density of 5 inhabitants per square kilometre (13/sq mi) . Its population growth rate over the decade 2001–2011 was 5.77%. Upper Siang has a sex ratio of 891 females for every 1000 males, and a literacy rate of 59.94%. Scheduled Tribes make up 80.60% of the population.

Religions in Upper Siang district (2011)
Religion	Per cent
Donyi-Polo	59.36%
Christianity	15.98%
Hinduism	14.90%
Buddhism	7.30%
Islam	1.16%
Other or not stated	1.30%

Various tribal groups of the Adi people and the Memba tribe live in the district. The Adi tribe generally follows Donyi-Polo, and the Memba are followers of Tibetan Buddhism.

=== Languages ===
Languages spoken include Adi, a Sino-Tibetan tongue with approximately 140 000 speakers, and Tshangla and Khampa Tibetan languages both belonging to the Bodish group, these languages are written in both the Tibetan and Latin scripts.

At the time of the 2011 census, 72.01% of the population spoke Adi, 6.54% Bhotia, 4.44% Nepali, 3.93% Hindi, 1.91% Odia, 1.78% Assamese, 1.42% Bengali and 1.25% Bhojpuri as their first language.

== Flora and fauna ==
In 1986 Upper Siang district became home to Mouling National Park, which has an area of 483 km^{2} (186.5 mi^{2}). A new mammal to science, Mebo giant flying squirrel (Petaurista siangensis) has been reported from this district.

== Villages ==
- Puging
- Singa

== Banking facilities in Upper Siang ==
List of banks functioning in Upper Siang.

- State Bank Of India, Tuting
- State Bank Of India, Yingkiong
