= Bordumsa =

- Town
- Location in Arunachal Pradesh, India Bordumsa (India)
- Coordinates: 27°31′10″N 95°53′18″E
- Country: India
- State: Arunachal Pradesh
- District: Changlang district
- Established: 1923
- Founder: Dumsa Nong
- Named for: Dumsa Families
- Elevation: 140 m (460 ft)
- Time zone: UTC+5:30 (IST)
- Pincode(s): 792 056
- Area code: 03800
- ISO 3166 code: IN-AR
- Vehicle registration: AR-12

Bordumsa is a town located in the Changlang district of Arunachal Pradesh, India. As of 2008, the population of Bordumsa is 29,368.
