= Changlang =

- Town
- Location in Arunachal Pradesh, India Changlang (India)
- Coordinates: 27°8′19.223″N 95°44′11.345″E
- Country: India
- State: Arunachal Pradesh
- District: Changlang

Population (2011)
  - Total: 6,236

Languages
  - Official: English
- Time zone: UTC+5:30 (IST)
- PIN: 792120
- Telephone code: 03808
- ISO 3166 code: IN-AR
- Vehicle registration: AR
- Climate: Tropical rainforest climate (Af).
- Website: www.changlang.nic.in

Changlang is a census town and headquarters of the Changlang district in the Indian state of Arunachal Pradesh. It has become one of the major districts in the area owing to the presence of crude oil, coal and mineral resources other than tourism and hydro power.

Changlang is located at the co-ordinates 27.12°N 95.71°E.

== Etymology ==
According to legend the name Changlang owes its origin to the local word changlangkan, which means hilltop where people discovered the poisonous herb which is used for poisoning fish in the river.

== Demographics ==
As of 2001 India census, Changlang had a population of 6,394. Males constitute 56% of the population and females 44%. Changlang has an average literacy rate of 72%, higher than the national average of 59.5%; with male literacy of 78% and female literacy of 65%. 14% of the population is under 6 years of age.

=== Languages ===
Languages spoken in Changlang (2011)
1. Tangsa (21.3%)
2. Nepali (13.2%)
3. Bengali (10.9%)
4. Hindi (9.70%)
5. Assamese (9.25%)
6. Bhojpuri (5.72%)
7. Others (30.0%)

According to Census 2011, Tangsa language is Spoken by 1,326, Nepali is Spoken by 823 people, Bengali at 677 people, Hindi by 605 people, Assamese at 577 and Bhojpuri at 357.

== Additional Reading ==
- Rebels eye Arunachal alternative to Bhutan - Army sees possible Red Cross intervention in Himalayan kingdom as advantage to banned group
