= Miao, Arunachal Pradesh =

Miao, Changlang
- town
- Location within Arunachal Pradesh Location within India
- Coordinates: 27.49°N 96.20°E
- Country: India
- State: Arunachal Pradesh
- District: Changlang

Population (2011)
  - Total: 5,841
- Time zone: UTC+5:30 (IST)
- PIN: 792122
- ISO 3166 code: IN-AR
- Nearest city: Kharsang
- Climate: Cwa

Miao is a sub-division in the Changlang district in the state of Arunachal Pradesh, India. It is located about 25 km from the Assam border. It is one of the 60 constituencies of Arunachal.

== Geography and climate ==
Miao is located at 27.49°N 96.20°E.

Miao is located in a region where it gets one of the heaviest rainfall in north-east India. The noa-dihing is the most important river flowing through Miao. The mountain range is called Patkai Bum and is the eastern extension of the Himalayas.

The tall forests make the region a good haven for smugglers. The Miao region covers the towns of Diyun and Chowkham. Diyun is the stronghold of the Chakmas and Chowkham to the Khamptis. Chowkham has generated wealth from the plywood business to a degree that once it was the richest village in Asia. Though it is low in literacy, most of the people here boast of spunky cars. It is a small town, but it is connected by road and has a transport station with a bus available daily.

== Tourism ==
Miao is also a popular tourist location. The Namdapha tiger project is situated here. There is a mini zoo, a museum and various other sites to be visited. Deban is the main tourist spot, 25 km from Miao. The people here are mainly engaged in government jobs, but the people of nearby villages survive on agriculture. Jhum cultivation is very famous here, now people have started tea plantations too. It is a developing town, with about four primary schools and one secondary school.

== Demographics ==
Miao has a cosmopolitan atmosphere. The main tribes in this region are the Tangsa, Singpho, and Lisu. A major chunk of Chakma people and Tibetan refugees have a settlement area. It is a custom for the Tibetans to burn effigies of Chinese leaderships during the anniversary of the exile of their leader to India.

To the north of Chowkham is the region inhabited by the Mishmi people. Their region is famous for opium cultivation because its dry mountainous landscape is very suitable for growing opium.

=== Languages ===
Languages spoken in Miao Town (2011)
1. Bengali (18.4%)
2. Nepali (14.5%)
3. Hindi (10.3%)
4. Tangsa (8.87%)
5. Assamese (8.54%)
6. Adi (4.45%)
7. Wancho (4.38%)
8. Nishi (3.94%)
9. Others (inc. Singpho) (26.6%)

According to the Census 2011, Bengali is Spoken by 1,073 people, Hindi by 915 people, Nepali by 849, Tangsa by 518 people, Assamese by 500, Adi by 260 people, Wancho by 256 people and Nishi by 230.

== Politics ==
Miao has many government offices. There is an Additional Deputy Commissioner office, Divisional Manager, Public Works Department, and Rural Works Department.

As of October 2016, the Minister of the Miao constituency is Kamlung Mossang.

== Education ==
Until recent years, there were only government-run schools until the twelfth standard. Now there are many private schools.

== Media ==
Miao also can boast of a weekly news publication called "The Miao Times" by Pisi Zauing Singpho. That provides local news and has a good circulation in the area.

== Religion ==
Miao is well known for the majority residing community the Singphos. The Singpho community dominantly follows Buddhism. The Buddhist monastery in the Miao town is where people gather to worship Lord Buddha and get blessings from the Lord and the monks. The monastery in Miao is yet another milestone of the Buddha teachings. With time there have been many Christians in this town. Miao Town Baptist Church is perhaps one of the first established churches. They preach messages in Hindi and sometimes in English, so visitors might find this church a good place to go. There are also Revival Church, Church of Christ, and the Catholic Church.

There are Hindu temples right in the middle of the Miao Bazaar. And there is a Rangfrah temple, an indigenous religion of tangsa people, near the Namdapha Field Director's office.
