= Daporijo =

Daporijo Dapo
- Town
- Nickname: Town of sunshiners
- Location in Arunachal Pradesh, India Daporijo (India)
- Coordinates: 27°59′10″N 94°13′15″E
- Country: India
- State: Arunachal Pradesh
- District: Upper Subansiri
- Established: 19 June 1991

Government
  - Type: democratic
  - Body: district court

Population (2001)
  - Total: 15,468
- Time zone: UTC+5:30 (IST)
- ISO 3166 code: IN-AR
- Vehicle registration: AR

Daporijo is a census town in the Upper Subansiri district in the northeastern Indian state of Arunachal Pradesh.

== Demographics ==
As of the 2001 India census, Daporijo had a population of 15,468. Males constitute 52% of the population and females 48%. Daporijo has an average literacy rate of 59%, marginally lower than the national average of 59.5%: male literacy is 66% and, female literacy is 51%. In Daporijo, 19% of the population is under 6 years of age. Daporijo is the headquarters of the Upper Subansiri District.

== Governance ==
Taniya Soki is the MLA of 24th Daporijo constituency (as of April-2019), and the Deputy Commissioner-cum-District Magistrate was Kanto Dangen APCS as of January 2021.

== Topography ==
Daporijo is located at an elevation of 600 m above sea level. It is located beside the river Subansiri, one of the principal rivers of Arunachal Pradesh, and a major tributary of the Brahmaputra.

== See also ==
List of constituencies of Arunachal Pradesh Legislative Assembly there is a total of 60th constituencies
