= Vijaynagar, Arunachal Pradesh =

Vijaynagar
- Village
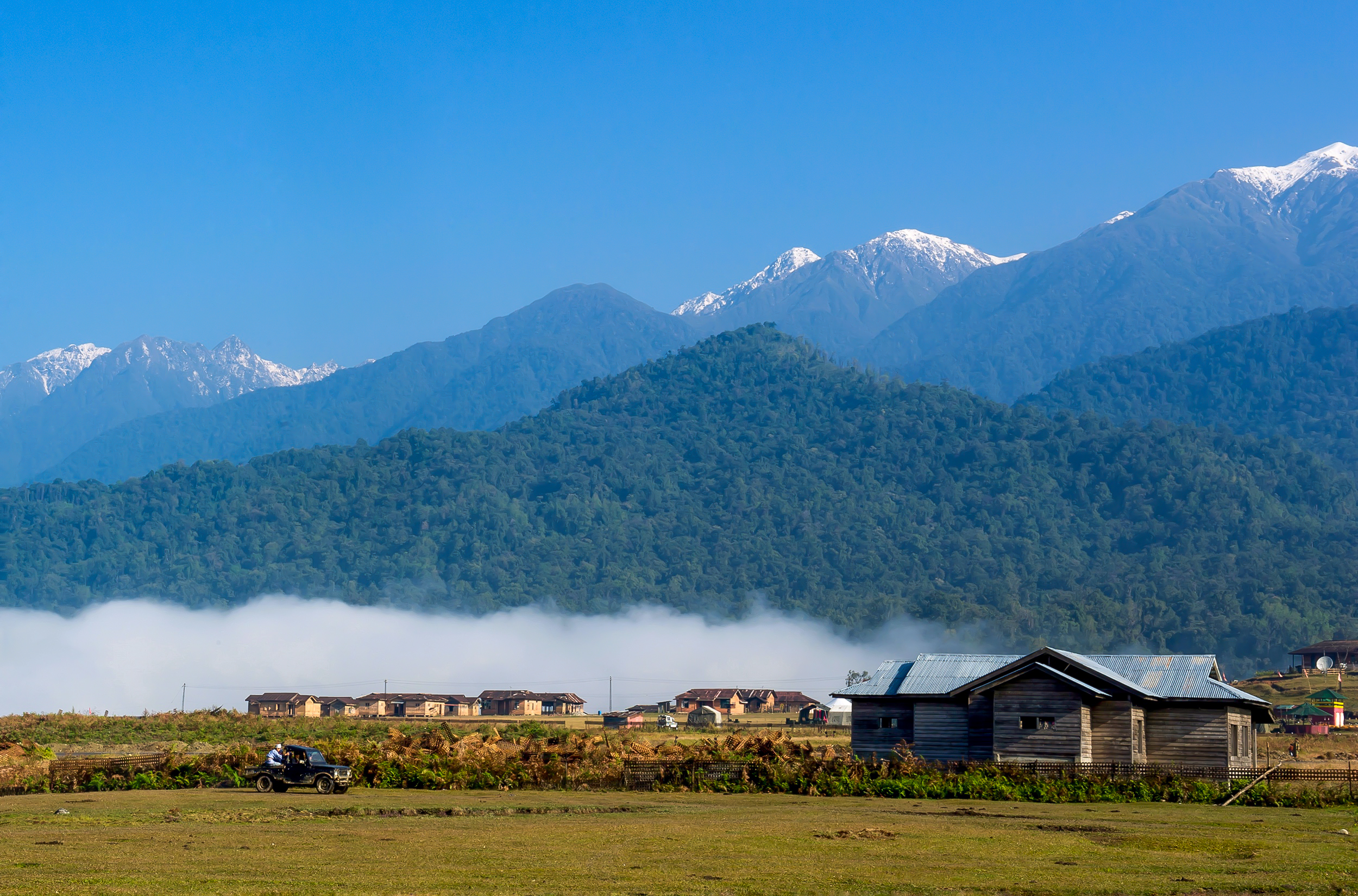

- Location in Arunachal Pradesh, India Vijaynagar (India)
- Coordinates: 27°11′31″N 96°59′59″E
- Country: India
- State: Arunachal Pradesh
- District: Changlang
- Established: 1965
- Founder: Maj. Gen. Ajit Singh Guraya
- Named for: Vijay Nagar
- Elevation: 1,240 m (4,070 ft)

Languages
  - Official: English
- Time zone: UTC+05:30 (IST)
- Postal code: 792055
- ISO 3166 code: IN-AR
- Vehicle registration: AR

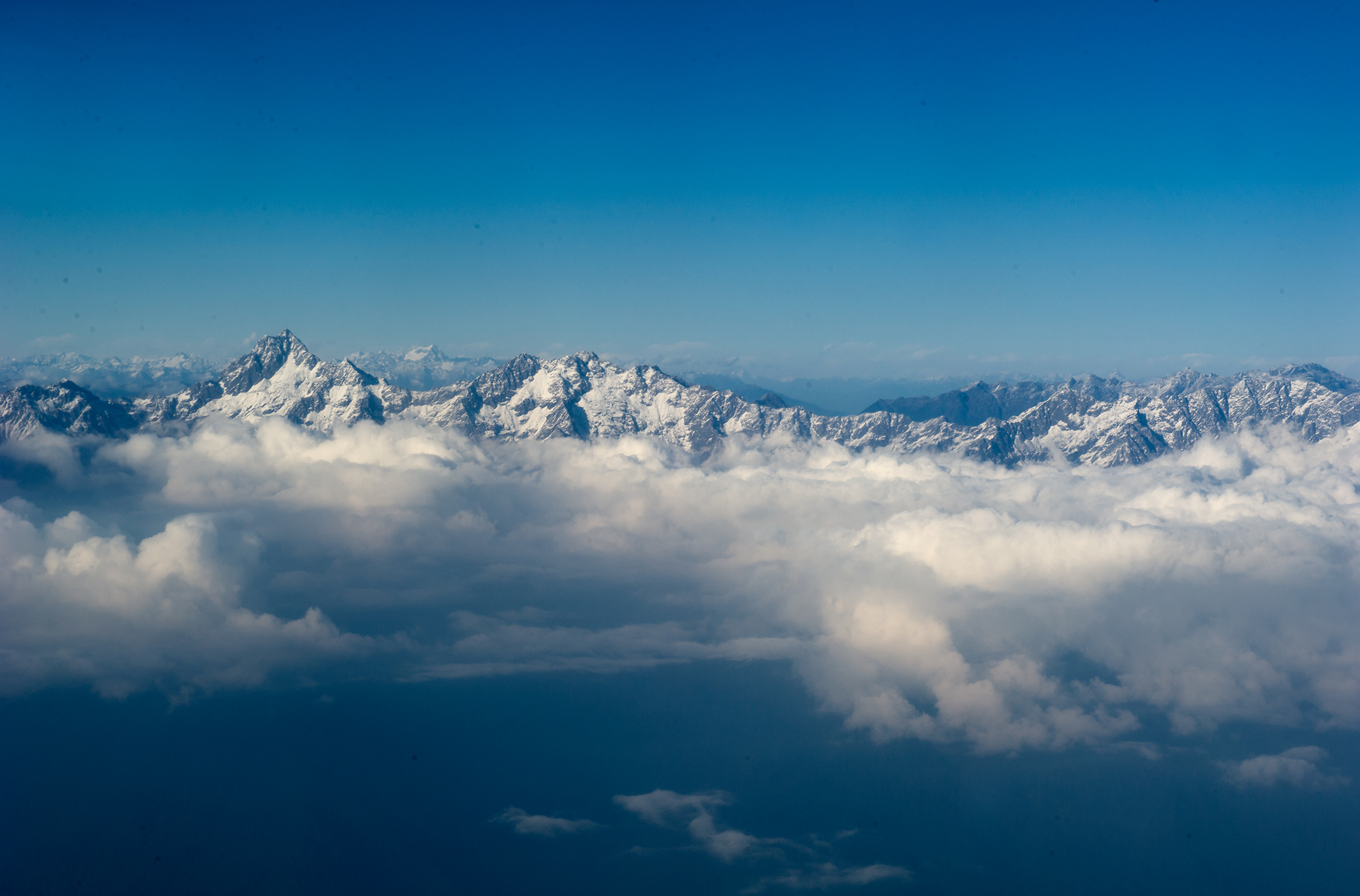
Aerial view of surrounding mountains

Vijoynagar (also known as Vijay Nagar and Vijaynagar) is a remote town and circle headquarter in the Changlang district of south Arunachal Pradesh in Northeast India. It is located in the easternmost inhabited area of the country, bordered by Myanmar on three sides and the Namdapha National Park on the other.

== History ==
=== Prehistoric ===
Early Trade (2nd Century BCE): Records from the Han Dynasty suggest that Chinese merchants from Sichuan traded silk and bamboo with "India" (then referred to as Shendu) via Upper Myanmar, likely utilizing the Chaukan Pass or Pangsau Pass near Miao.

The indigenous Singpho and Tangsa tribes have oral histories that predate colonial records. The name Namdapha itself is derived from the Singpho words "Nam" (water) and "Dapha" (origin), referring to the river's source at the Chaukan Pass. Local oral traditions of the Singpho and Yobin tribes mention ancient fortifications and stone markers deep within the forest that predated colonial arrival. However, the extreme humidity and acidic soil of the Namdapha rainforest have largely disintegrated organic and even some stone structures over the millennia.

=== Medieval era ===
During the 13th century, the Tai-Ahoms entered the Assam plains through these same Patkai passes, fundamentally altering the political landscape of the region.

=== 1939-45: World War II ===
The Vijaynagar and Miao region holds deep historical significance related to World War II and the consolidation of post-Independence India. During World War II, this area was part of the infamous The Hump air route, the perilous Allied airlift from India to China after the Japanese blocked the Burma Road in 1942. The dense rainforests around the Noa Dihing River and Namdapha forests became a "graveyard" for hundreds of Allied aircraft that crashed due to extreme turbulence and mechanical failure, with wreckages still being discovered by locals today.

Additionally, the region witnessed the "Epic of Chaukan Pass" in 1942, where over 230 British refugees and soldiers fleeing the Japanese advance in Burma were rescued by the British tea planter Gyles Mackrell using a fleet of elephants to cross the flooded Dapha River near Miao.

=== 1961 May: Imti Expedition of India ===
The history of Vijaynagar as an integral Indian territory began with the Sumer Expedition in May 1961, when a 7th Assam Rifles team led by Major Sumer Singh Imti marched for weeks through the dense Namdapha forests to reach the Moloshidi Valley (also known as Daodi) and hoisted the Indian Flag at Shidi village (later renamed Gandhigram) on 7 May 1961. This milestone is commemorated by Imti Point, a strategic landmark near the valley named to honor Major Imti's leadership in navigating what was then a cartographic "no man's land".

=== 1961 SRIJITGA-II Expedition of India ===
Later that year, the high-level SRIJITGA-II expedition, led by Major General Ajit Singh Guraya, arrived to formalize the administration of the serene landscape; he officially renamed the region Vijaynagar after his son, Vijay.

=== 1961-71 Gurkha resettlement to Vijaynagar ===
To secure this three-sided border with Burma (now Myanmar), the North-East Frontier Agency (NEFA) initiated a settlement program between 1961 and 1971, relocating 200 families of retired Assam Rifles personnel—95% of whom were ethnic Gurkhas—to villages like Phaparbari and Hazolo alongside the indigenous Yobin (Lisu) community.

=== Post-independence illegal immigration ===
The history of post-independence migration in the Vijaynagar region is centered on the Yobin (Lisu) people, who migrated from Upper Myanmar into the Noa Dihing valley since 1950s, settling in what was then a remote and unadministered frontier area of India. Following the Imti Expedition of 1961, the Indian government formally established administrative control and initially granted the community citizenship rights, but their status became highly contentious in the 1970s and 1980s when political shifts led to the withdrawal of their Scheduled Tribe (ST) status and voting rights, with many being reclassified as "illegal migrants" or "refugees" despite their decades-long residency. This legal limbo sparked a protracted struggle for recognition that only saw significant resolution in 2015, when the Government of India and the Arunachal Pradesh state government officially restored their ST status.

The region continues to face modern challenges regarding the monitoring of newer unauthorized crossings from Myanmar following the 2021 military coup.

=== History of road and air connectivity ===
The Vijaynagar Advanced Landing Ground (ALG) airstrip, established in 1962, served as the sole gateway to the region for over sixty years, predating any motorable road. Following the Imti Expedition, the Indian Air Force (IAF) commenced operations using Dakota and Otter aircraft to support the fledgling settlement and ferry the 200 Gurkha families to their new homes. The use of these specific models in 1962 coincided with the Sino-Indian War, where the need for rapid troop mobilization to the Line of Actual Control (LAC) led to the urgent expansion of the Vijaynagar ALG.

In the 1970s, the "MV Road" (Miao-Vijaynagar Road ) was roughly cleared as a fair-weather track for Indian Military supply convoys.

After 1983 when surrounding forests were notified as the Namdapha National Park, which introduced strict environmental regulations that halted major construction, the road was reclaimed by the rainforest for decades; this left the Yobin (Lisu) community and local settlers isolated, forced to trek for 5 to 6 days to reach Miao for essential goods.

In 1984, the airfield transitioned to Antonov AN-32 operations due to the closer of road via the national park, but the runway-initially constructed from Pierced Steel Plate (PSP) sheets-gradually deteriorated due to the harsh humid climate of the Namdapha rainforest, leading to a suspension of heavy aircraft operations in 2016. Recognizing its strategic necessity, a massive renovation was undertaken, and the resurfaced runway was officially reopened in September 2019, restoring vital air-maintenance for the 16 villages and enhancing the operational reach of the Indian Army near the Myanmar border.

In 2021, a major turning point occurred when the Arunachal Pradesh state government, under Chief Minister Pema Khandu, prioritized the project, leading to the road's incorporation into the Arunachal Frontier Highway (NH-913) project, which successfully connected Vijaynagar by motorable road for the first time in 2023. Today, while the road remains a challenging passage through sensitive ecological zones, it has transitioned from a historical "lost trail" into a key pillar of national security and regional development.

== Geography ==
Vijoynagar is 157 km (98 mi) from Miao. It is bordered to the south and east by Myanmar, and to the north by a thick forest of the Namdapha National Park. Nearby Indian cities are Miao, Hayuliang, and Tezu. Putao is the nearest city in Myanmar.

Noa Dihing River, also locally known as the Nam Dhing and Dihing River, which originates near Chaukan Pass and flows westward into Assam in India as a tributary of the Brahmaputra River. Vijaynagar and the valleys and passes around it lie in the basin of this river.

Patkai Bum range surrounds the Noa Dihing River valley and Vijaynagar from 3 sides and all the passes around Vijaynagar lie in this subrange. Patkai Bum range is a sub-range of the Patkai hills in southeastern Arunachal Pradesh. This mountain chain forms part of the natural boundary between India and Myanmar. The range is known for its forested ridges, rugged terrain, and conical peaks, and plays a vital role in regional ecology and hydrology. The Patkai range is historically significant as part of ancient trade and migration routes between Northeast India and Upper Burma. Forming part of the larger Purvanchal Range, the Patkai Hills are characterized by steep slopes, conical peaks, and deep valleys. The range is densely forested and supports a rich biodiversity, including rare species such as the Hoolock gibbon and various hornbill species. The Patkai Hills are not as rugged as the Himalayas, with peaks generally lower in elevation. One of the significant passes in this range is the Pangsau Pass, which historically served as a strategic route during World War II. The Patkai Bum Range plays a crucial role in the climatic and ecological dynamics of the northeastern region of India.

Following passes, around Vijaynagar valley, lie in this subrange:

Gphuka Pass (approx. 2,200 m) lies roughly 14 km northwest of Vijaynagar in Changlang district of Arunachal Pradesh. It provides a route between India and Myanmar through the Patkai hills, marked by Border Pillar No. 182. The Nam Dihing River flows nearby in India, and the area beyond the pass falls into the basin of the Chindwin River in Myanmar. The nearest peak is Shawngshan Bum (2,448 m).

Hpungan Pass (3,072 m) is situated north of Vijaynagar in Changlang district of Arunachal Pradesh, and is part of the border trail system in the eastern Patkai range. It is marked by Border Pillar No. 185. The Indian side is drained by the Nam Dihing River, and the Myanmar side by tributaries of the Chindwin River. The nearest notable peak is Phongan Razi (3,635 m).

Mugaphi Pass (3,650 m) is located approximately 24 km east of Vijaynagar in Changlang district of Arunachal Pradesh. It is one of the highest passes in the region and part of the cross-border route into Myanmar. Border Pillar No. 184 is nearby. The Nam Dihing River lies on the Indian side, while the Myanmar side leads into the Chindwin River system. The closest peak is Phongan Razi (3,635 m).

Chaukan Pass (2,448 metres), approximately 25 km southeast of Vijaynagar in Arunachal Pradesh, is a significant saddle on the India–Myanmar border between two peaks Chaukan Bum (3,046 m) in north and Chawngshan Bum (3,287 m) in south all of which lie on junction of Patkai and Kumon mountain ranges. Marked by the Border Pillar No. 183, established in 1971, and is surrounded by dense tropical forests and rugged terrain. The pass historically served as a route toward Putao, the nearest settlement in Myanmar located approximately 60 km to the northeast accessible via challenging trails through the Hukawng Valley, in Myanmar's Kachin State. The Noa Dihing River flows westward into Assam in India. On the Myanmar side, the pass descends into the basin of the Namyang River (also known as the Namyang River, not to be confused with similarly named Namwan River), which eventually joins the Chindwin River.

== Administration ==
Vijoynagar, part of Arunachal East Lok Sabha constituency and the Bordumsa-Diyun Assembly constituency and managed by an Extra Assistant Commissioner (EAC) as the circle headquarter within the Miao Sub-Division of the Changlang District, consists of a cluster of 16 villages on the border with Myanmar: Ramnagar, Chididi, Majgoan, Two-hut, Budhamandir, Phaparbari, Daragoan, Gehrigaon, Topi-Hill, Preeti Nagar, (Assam Rifle settlers), and Hazolo, Sidikuh, Twohut and Dawadi (Yobin inhabitants). Vijaynagar is also known as Daudi in the local language of the Lisu (Yobin) people.

== People ==
Demography: The area comprises sixteen villages with a population of approximately 4,500-5,000 people. The 55% of the population is Gurkha, who speak Gurkhali language of Indo-Aryan language family and mainly live in Vijaynagar HQ, Ramnagar, Phaparbari, and Mazgaon. The 45% are Lisu people (Yobin), who speak a tonal Lisu language of Tibeto-Burman language family and mainly live in Gandhigram, Sidikuh, Dawodi, Hazolo, with their population concentrated in Gandhigram, which accounts for nearly 40% of the entire circle's population with approximately 1,754 residents. Remaining 1% are other civil and military administration.

Religion: The 50% of the population follows the Indian-origin religions, i.e. 45% Hindus and 5% Buddhist, who are mainly Gurkhas as well as the small number of Monpa and Khamti tribes. The 48% are converted-Christians tribals who are mostly Yobin. Remaining 2%, who are mostly Yobin, still follow the indigenous religions which are officially classified as Hindus.

== Education ==
School education: Educational infrastructure includes several primary schools; and a government-run secondary school which offers classes up to the 12th standard locally in arts, commerce and science streams.

Vocational training: While there are no confirmed construction start dates for a local ITI as of 2026, the state government has set up the Skill India hubs for all Vibrant Villages to train local youth in tourism, hydro-power maintenance, and horticulture.

University education: The Department of Education is establishing a partnership with Indira Gandhi National Open University (IGNOU) to provide e-learning modules and distance degree courses once the high-speed satellite broadband is stabilized, with courses expected to be available from 2026-27. Students seeking on-site physical campus-based vocational training or university education are still required to travel to the nearest functional ITIs or tertiary education institutes in Miao, Roing, or Tezu.

== Infrastructure ==
As of early 2026, the infrastructure in the Vijaynagar circle has undergone a significant modernization through the Vibrant Villages Programme.

Emergency and civil disaster management: The District Disaster Management Officer (DDMO) in Changlang oversees the Incident Response System (IRS) for the region, the first local responders are the Arunachal Pradesh Police (APP) station in Vijaynagar and community volunteers trained under the Aapda Mitra scheme, who can be reached via the state-wide toll-free disaster number (1077 or 1090). In severe events (earthquakes, major landslides blocking the MV Road, or medical emergencies), the AR battalion stationed in Vijaynagar manages local search and rescue and provides immediate medical stabilization at their battalion MI Room, and the IAF provides Heavy Lift Fixed-Wing Transport Aircraft support and Helicopter MEDEVAC for transporting critical casualties from the Vijaynagar Advanced Landing Ground (ALG) to Dibrugarh. Vijaynagar is located in Highest Damage Risk Seismic Zone V highly vulnerable to high-intensity quakes, also the Noa-Dihing River is prone to flash floods during the monsoon (May–September), which can sever the only road link to Miao.

Common Service Centres (CSC): It offers for-fee access to the online digital services to government schemes.

24x7 hydroelectric power: Earlier dependent on diesel generators and small-scale personal solar systems that frequently failed during nocturnal hours or prolonged cloud cover exceeding two to three days, the region's power supply is now facilitated by the localized hydroelectricity, the 1 MW Dehing Micro Hydroelectric Project (DMHP) and the 500 KW Sirit Micro Hydro Project (SMHC), the extension of the electric grid to all 16 villages in the valley is ongoing, with priority focus on primary residential clusters and border outposts (BOP). The long-term goal for the Vibrant Villages in Arunachal Pradesh involves laying high-capacity Optical Fibre Cable (OFC) along the new NH-913 Frontier Highway corridor once the highway is operational. The "Digital Village" initiative for Vijaynagar also includes the deployment of Wi-Fi hotspots in public institutions such as the upgraded Government Higher Secondary School and the Primary Health Centre, which will utilize the BBNL satellite link to provide non-discriminatory internet access to students and healthcare workers.

Digital connectivity: It has been modernized through the 4G Saturation Project, replacing legacy satellite-linked 2G/3G equipment and 10 meters antennae with a new high-altitude BSNL telecom tower standing approximately 40 to 60 metres tall to overcome the dense canopy of Namdapha National Park. This tower installed by BSNL provides 4G services with an effective range of 10 to 15 kilometres, primarily supporting BSNL SIM cards, although regional roaming for Airtel and Jio is also supported. The focus as of April 2026 is establishing stable 4G data first, with the software-defined upgrade to 5G expected to be enabled once the backhaul (the connection from the tower to the main network) is sufficiently upgraded via satellite or microwave links.

Healthcare: The local Primary Health Centre (PHC) Vijaynagar has been upgraded to include 24-hour emergency observation beds and basic maternal care under a Public-Private Partnership (PPP) model. It is now part of the 40 Mobile Medical Units (MMUs) network, which brings AI-enabled portable X-rays and diagnostic kits directly to the 16 villages. The Assam Rifles (AR) maintains a medical inspection room at their battalion headquarters in Vijaynagar. While their primary duty is military, they operate a Civil-Military Outreach where AR medical officers (doctors) provide consultations, minor surgeries, and life-saving stabilizers to civilians. The AR conducts weekly door-to-door medical camps for elderly residents in the valley who cannot reach the PHC. For critical emergencies, the military remains the primary coordinator for medical evacuation (MEDEVAC) by helicopter to Dibrugarh or Guwahati.

Vijoynagar Airport, also called the Vijaynagar Advanced Landing Ground (ALG), with 1,213-metre (4,000 feet) asphalt surface runway upgraded in 2019 to handle modern fighter jets and large heavy-lift transport planes (e.g. Antonov AN-32 and Lockheed Martin C-130J Super Hercules), is a dual-use civilian-military airport. This is the 8th Advanced Landing Ground (ALG) in Arunachal Pradesh which was upgraded by the Indian Airforce (IAF) and Indian Army.

== Tourism ==
With progressively improving connectivity, Vijaynagar is emerging as a center for eco-tourism and rural tourism in Arunachal Pradesh, characterized by the high-altitude biodiversity of the surrounding Namdapha National Park and the cultural heritage of the Yobin and Gurkha communities. The valley is geographically isolated, bordered on three sides by Myanmar and enclosed by dense temperate and sub-tropical forests. The state government has initiated infrastructure and sustainability projects to facilitate tourism in the region. In settlements such as Hazolo, local residents participate in the service sector as guides for expeditions to the Chaukan Pass and the Noa Dihing headwaters, and through the establishment of homestays. The Yobin (Lisu) inhabitants maintain traditional artisanal practices, producing various handmade goods. State-led awareness programs have been implemented to integrate hospitality training with environmental conservation and cultural preservation efforts.

Tourist attractions include the following:

- Mandatory Permits Required: The region's isolation and proximity to the Myanmar border necessitate permits: an Inner Line Permit (ILP) for Indian tourists and a Protected Area Permit (PAP) for foreign tourists.
- Trekking in Vijoynagar

Vijaynagar provides numerous cultural enrichment and eco-tourism trekking and driving opportunities to several villages and passes in the area.

- Imti Point, a historic point, at Hazolo village on Miao-Vijaynagar Road.
- Namdapha National Park and Tiger Reserve

Located adjacent to Vijaynagar, Namdapha National Park is the fourth-largest national park in India, spanning 1,985 km^{2}. It is a biodiversity hotspot in the Eastern Himalayas, hosting over 1,000 floral and 1,400 faunal species, including rare species like the snow leopard, clouded leopard, red panda, and Hoolock gibbon. The park offers trekking, camping, and birdwatching, with campsites like Deban and Hornbill for nature enthusiasts. The best time to visit is October to March.
Visitors require an Inner Line Permit (ILP) for entry into Arunachal Pradesh and a tourist permit from the Field Director's Office at Namdapha.
Jungle safari: While Namdapha National Park is a designated Tiger Reserve, traditional vehicle-based tiger tours are not conducted due to the dense rainforest and rugged terrain; instead, wildlife viewing is primarily facilitated through guided multi-day treks and specialized birding expeditions from Deban toward the Vijaynagar valley. Visitors often engage local guides from the Yobin or Singpho communities to navigate the core areas in search of the park's elusive four big cat species and the endangered Hoolock Gibbon, as the thick evergreen canopy makes sightings rare compared to the open grasslands of central Indian reserves.

- Noa Dihing River adventure tourism: This river originates from the Chaukan Pass and flows through the valley, offering opportunities for river rafting, angling, and riverside camping near Deban and Vijaynagar.
- Chaukan Pass trekking: Located on the Indo-Myanmar border, this high-altitude pass is a challenging trekking destination known for its historical association with World War II rescue missions and its role as a natural gateway for regional migrations.
- Lake of No Return viewpoint (Nampong): Accessible via the Pangsau Pass (near Miao/Jairampur), this lake is shrouded in World War II myths regarding missing Allied aircraft and remains a significant stop for those exploring the broader region's war history.
- Buddist Monasteries and Shrines: The local communities, including the Gurkha and tribal settlements, have established various local shrines and small monasteries that reflect the syncretic cultural landscape of the frontier.
- Miao Museum

Situated near the Field Director's Office of Namdapha National Park, the Miao Museum, maintained by park authorities, displays animal specimens from Namdapha, including mammal pelts and bird skins, offering insights into the biodiversity of the Mishmi Hills.

- Miao Mini Zoo

Located opposite the Miao Museum, the Miao Mini Zoo houses species native to Namdapha, such as slow loris, Assamese macaque, pig-tailed macaque, Hoolock gibbon, leopard cat, porcupine, and Himalayan palm civet. It provides an educational experience for tourists interested in the region's wildlife.

- Gandhigram and Vijaynagar Inspection Bungalows

Maintained by the Public Works Department (PWD), these inspection bungalows in Gandhigram and Vijaynagar serve as accommodation options for tourists. They provide a base for exploring the remote region, though advance reservations through the Field Director's Office at Namdapha are recommended.

- Homestays cultural experience

Homestays in villages like Gandhigram and Vijaynagar are also available, with focus on sustainable eco-tourism, allowing visitors to experience the traditional lifestyles of the Yobin and Gurkha settlers while navigating the remote frontier.

- Vijaynagar Advanced Landing Ground (ALG)

Operated by the Indian Air Force, the Vijaynagar ALG is a key logistical point in this remote area. While primarily a military site, its strategic location near the Myanmar border may interest visitors curious about the region's geopolitical significance.

== Transport ==
Until the Miao-Vijoynagar Road is fully constructed and/or Vijoynagar Airport is brought under the UDAN scheme, a challenging 6-day trek from Miao is required (2025 update).

=== Air ===
Vijoynagar Airport offers the following:

- Helicopter services: Scheduled commercial civilian helicopter services from Mohanbari Airport in Dibrugarh in Assam or Miao in Arunachal Pradesh are available on Tuesdays and Thursdays, subject to seat availability.
- Fixed-wing aircraft services: Though it not yet open for the civilian traffic as of 2025, since there are demands to bring this under UDAN regional connectivity for the scheduled commercial civilian flights, under the Modified UDAN Scheme (approved March 2026 with a ₹28,840 crore outlay), Vijaynagar ALG is being readied for scheduled fixed-wing passenger flights. Alliance Air has committed to deploying indigenous Dornier 228 aircraft to frontier ALGs once terminal and safety infrastructure-such as the newly installed high-altitude BSNL telecom tower for enhanced navigation-is fully commissioned.

=== Railway ===
Margherita railway station in Assam is the nearest existing station, approximately 220 km east of Vijoynagar, and 65 km from Miao.

=== Road ===
- Arunachal Pradesh Frontier Highway (APFH) has Vijoynagar as its western terminus point. It is a 2,000 km (1,200 mi) road following the McMahon Line from Mago (Tawang) and Thingbu to Vijoynagar. A map of the proposed route can be seen here and here. Before being upgraded to the AFPH, the Vijoynagar-Miao road, costing ₹225 crores, construction was completed in 2019. The Miao–Vijaynagar section of the Arunachal Frontier Highway (officially National Highway 913), historically referred to as MV Road, begins at Kharsang and serves as the strategic 157-kilometre (98 mi) lifeline connecting the remote Vijaynagar circle to the rest of India. The route traces the Noa Dihing River through the Namdapha National Park, passing through key settlements including Miao, Mpen, Deban (a major camping ground and entry point), Ngwazakha, Nibodi, Yacheley, Gandhigram (the largest village en route at the 137 km mark), Hazolo (site of a critical bridge and historic Imti Point), and Phaparbari. While the road is undergoing extensive upgrades to meet National Highway standards, as of April 2026 the fuel availability remains highly restricted; reliable petrol and diesel stations are only located at the starting hubs of Kharsang and Miao, with no formal gas stations existing between Miao and Vijaynagar due to the environmental sensitivity of the national park. Beyond Miao, travelers must rely on carried reserves or local procurement in emergency situations at Gandhigram, as the area is primarily air-maintained for heavy supplies.
- There are plans to extend this APFH to Putao Airport in Myanmar under the Look East policy, thus connecting it to both India's and Myanmar's national highway networks.
- Local mettled link roads to villages around Vijaynagar were built and upgraded in 2019.

== See also ==
- List of extreme points of India
- Ledo Road
