= Memba people =

People of Arunachal Pradesh, India

Memba
Total population
- 5,000 (2011 census)

Regions with significant populations
- India (Arunachal Pradesh)

Languages
- Memba

Religion
- Buddhism

The Memba are a people of Arunachal Pradesh. The Memba population is currently around four to five thousand. Local genealogies suggested that they came from Tibet and settled in the region several centuries ago.

The Membas follow Nyingmapa Tibetan Buddhism and have their own script, Hikor, which is derived from the Tibetan script. In every village, there is a small Gompa presided by a Buddhist Lama. As devout Buddhists, they follow the intricate details in puja's rituals, hoisting at least one Buddhist prayer flag or a string of small Buddhist prayer flags in front of every household. Festivals that are celebrated by the Memba include Losar and Choskar.
