= Aalo =

Aalo Aalo
- District Headquarters
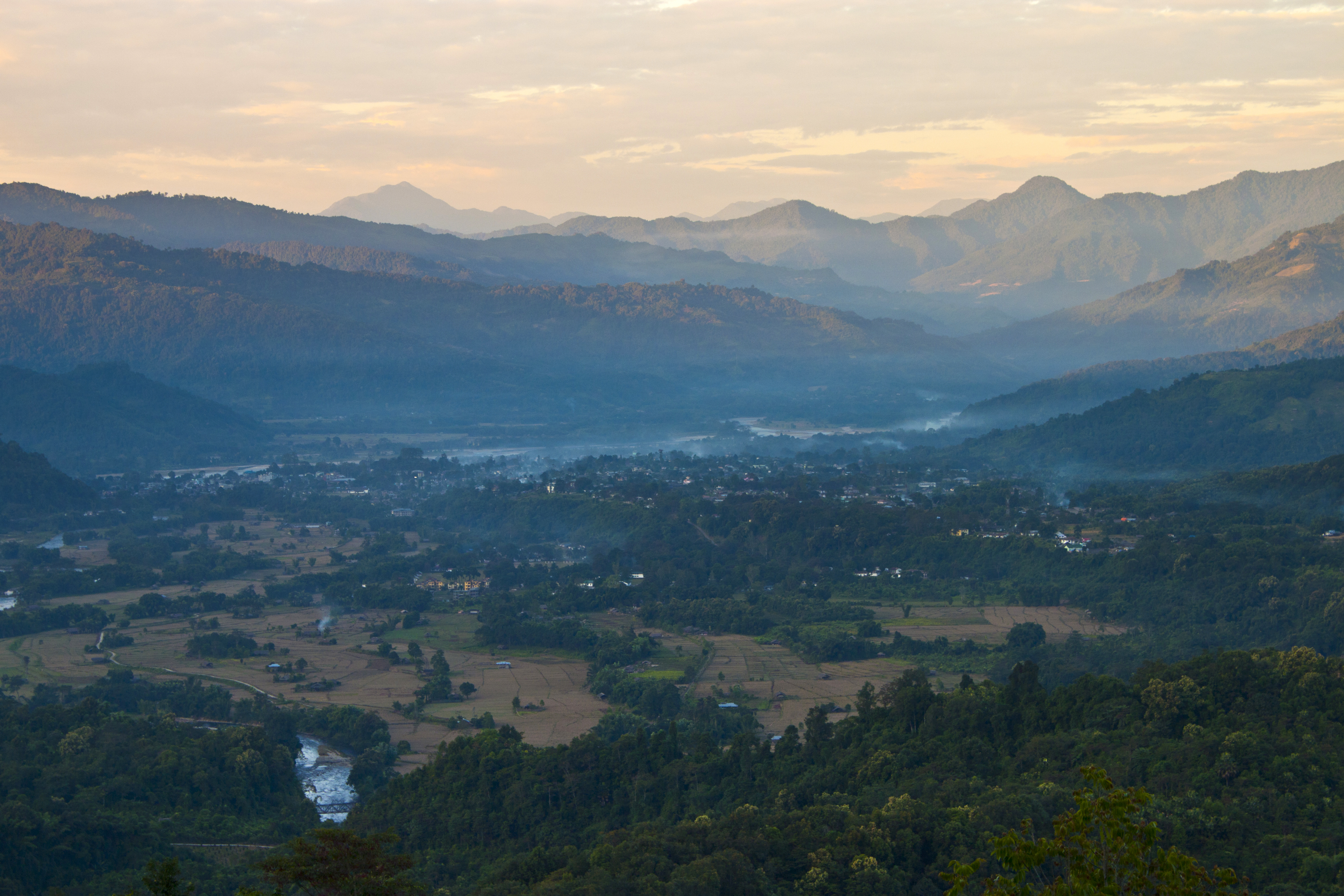
- View of Aalo Town

- Location in Arunachal Pradesh, India Aalo (India)
- Coordinates: 28°10′14.531″N 94°47′58.259″E
- Country: India
- State: Arunachal Pradesh
- District: West Siang district
- Established: 1948

Government
  - Type: Multi Party democracy
  - Deputy Commissioner: Shri Penga Tato, APCS
- Elevation: 295 m (968 ft)

Population (2011)
  - Total: 20,680
  - Rank: 4 (in AP)
  - Density: 13/km^{2} (34/sq mi)

Languages
  - Official: English
- Time zone: UTC+5:30 (IST)
- PIN: 791 001
- Telephone code: 91 3783 XXX XXXX
- Vehicle registration: AR-08
- Climate: Cfa (Köppen)
- Precipitation: 2,477 millimetres (97.5 in)
- Avg. annual maximum temperature: 28.1 °C (82.6 °F)
- Avg. annual minimum temperature: 15.3 °C (59.5 °F)
- Avg. winter temperature: 18.5 °C (65.3 °F)
- Avg. summer temperature: 24.7 °C (76.5 °F)
- Website: westsiang.nic.in

Aalo, formerly Along, is a census town and headquarters of the West Siang district of the Indian state of Arunachal Pradesh. It is located 137 kilometres (85 mi) from Likabali, which is at the border of Assam and Arunachal Pradesh.

It is also an Advance Landing Ground (ALG) of the Indian Air Force.

== Culture ==
Mopin is the main festival that runs from 5 to 6 April. The Yomgo River Festival, held every year during peak tourist season, and lasting 3–4 days, is celebrated from 05-9 April. This festival is celebrated with a view to promote tourism, indigenous culture, and tradition, handloom & handicrafts and showcase its rich cultural heritage.

== Demographics ==
As of 2001, Along had a population of 16,834. Males constitute 56% of the population and females 44%. Aalo has an average literacy rate of 69%, higher than the national average of 59.5%; with 75% of the males and 61% of females literate. 15% of the population is under 6 years of age. The low sex ratio – 916 girls for every 1000 boys in 2001 – is cause for concern, even though it is not typical of the region.

In 2011, its population was 20,700. The majority of Aalo's(formerly Along) population consists of Galo people and Galo is the main languages but a huge population of Adi consists at Aalo Town. The major religion is Donyi-Polo, followed by Christianity and small minorities of followers of Tibetan Buddhism, Hinduism and Islam.

=== Languages ===
Languages spoken in Aalo (2011)
1. Adi 54.14 (52.2%)
2. Hindi 17.29 (16.7%)
3. Bengali 5.45 (5.25%)
4. Bhojpuri 4.78 (4.60%)
5. Nepali 4.62 (4.45%)
6. Assamese 3.78 (3.64%)
7. Others 13.75 (13.2%)

According to 2011 census, Adi was the most spoken language with 11,199 speakers followed by Hindi at 3,572, Bengali at 1,128, Bhojpuri at 989, Nepali at 956 and Assamese at 781.

== Climate ==
Climate data for Aalo (1961–1990, extremes 1969–1992)
Month	Jan	Feb	Mar	Apr	May	Jun	Jul	Aug	Sep	Oct	Nov	Dec	Year
Record high °C (°F)	31.8 (89.2)	30.3 (86.5)	35.5 (95.9)	36.1 (97.0)	40.0 (104.0)	40.0 (104.0)	38.9 (102.0)	38.3 (100.9)	39.7 (103.5)	40.5 (104.9)	34.1 (93.4)	30.1 (86.2)	40.5 (104.9)
Mean daily maximum °C (°F)	23.2 (73.8)	23.6 (74.5)	26.6 (79.9)	27.8 (82.0)	30.5 (86.9)	31.9 (89.4)	31.6 (88.9)	32.9 (91.2)	32.1 (89.8)	31.0 (87.8)	27.9 (82.2)	24.8 (76.6)	28.7 (83.7)
Daily mean °C (°F)	14.7 (58.5)	16.2 (61.2)	19.6 (67.3)	21.8 (71.2)	25.2 (77.4)	21.8 (71.2)	26.6 (79.9)	27.3 (81.1)	26.4 (79.5)	25.1 (77.2)	21.0 (69.8)	16.4 (61.5)	22.3 (72.1)
Mean daily minimum °C (°F)	7.5 (45.5)	10.4 (50.7)	13.9 (57.0)	16.5 (61.7)	19.5 (67.1)	22.7 (72.9)	23.3 (73.9)	23.5 (74.3)	22.6 (72.7)	19.3 (66.7)	13.3 (55.9)	8.6 (47.5)	16.8 (62.2)
Record low °C (°F)	1.1 (34.0)	1.2 (34.2)	7.1 (44.8)	6.9 (44.4)	9.9 (49.8)	17.1 (62.8)	17.1 (62.8)	19.3 (66.7)	18.9 (66.0)	7.5 (45.5)	3.5 (38.3)	0.6 (33.1)	0.6 (33.1)
Average rainfall mm (inches)	46.3 (1.82)	76.0 (2.99)	144.3 (5.68)	326.0 (12.83)	290.9 (11.45)	462.9 (18.22)	610.7 (24.04)	429.5 (16.91)	343.9 (13.54)	181.5 (7.15)	20.0 (0.79)	28.3 (1.11)	3,063.3 (120.60)
Average rainy days	4.3	6.8	9.6	13.7	13.7	17.4	20.1	14.5	12.5	6.8	2.1	2.5	122.0
Average relative humidity (%)	81	80	75	77	78	83	87	84	83	76	73	77	80
Source: India Meteorological Department

== Connectivity ==
Aalo does not have a good road network and the road which runs from north Lakhimpur to the capital city of Itanagar, connects the town of Aalo to the city. Regular bus services to Aalo run from Itanagar. Arunachal Pradesh State Transport Service (APSTS) buses are available to and from Aalo. There is a 5 hours journey by bus from Pasighat to Aalo (106 km) while from Moying (150 km) the bus will take around 6.5 hours to reach Aalo.

The nearest airport to Aalo is at Pasighat. It is connected by flight services to Guwahati, Dibrugarh, Tezpur among others. One can take a bus or hire a taxi from Pasighat to Aalo.

Aalo has no railway and the nearest railway station is at Murkongselek. A new line which connects Aalo to Silapathar through broad gauge railway was proposed and the survey has already been completed and forwarded to the railway board.

== Media ==
Along has an All India Radio Relay station known as Akashvani Along. It broadcasts on FM frequencies.

== See also ==
Military bases

- List of ALGs
- List of Indian Air Force stations
- India-China military deployment on LAC
- List of disputed India-China areas
- Tianwendian
- Ukdungle

Borders

- Line of Actual Control (LAC)
- Borders of China
- Borders of India

Conflicts

- Sino-Indian conflict
- List of disputed territories of China
- List of disputed territories of India

Other related topics

- India-China Border Roads
- List of extreme points of India
- Defence Institute of High Altitude Research
