= All Idu Mishmi Students Union =

- Abbreviation: AIMSU
- Type: Non-political and community-based organisation
- Location(s): Roing & Anini, India
- Region served: Lower and Upper Dibang Valley, East and Upper Siang and Lohit districts in Arunachal Pradesh
- Leader: Malo Linggi (President), Rajiv Mihu (Secretary)
- Main organ: Executive Body and Advisory Board
- Parent organization: Idu Mishmi Cultural and Literary Society

All Idu Mishmi Students Union (AIMSU) is a community-based student’s organization of Idu Mishmi tribe in Arunachal Pradesh, India.

The organization is socially active and best known for its movement against dams in Arunachal Pradesh's Dibang basin. It has been leading people's movement against execution of NHPC’s proposed Dibang dam.

== Structure ==
The organization is headed by President and General Secretary and a 15-member advisory board led by Chief Adviser.

== Focuses ==
According to Malo Linggi, President of the union, "AIMSU will work for upliftment of Idu Mishmi people. The deprivation of Idu youths in employment on matters of appointment in various government departments in Itanagar, Roing and Anini will be a major issue to be taken up by AIMSU. Another major concern of the union is the alienation of Idu people over their land and resources. The union will adopt non-violent and democratic means to fight for the cause.

== Activities ==
1. Raising issues on education, health and economy in districts of Dibang Valley and Lower Dibang Valley.
2. Carrying out campaign against large dams in Dibang basin, which is harmful to the interest of Idu Mishmmi community.
3. Anti drug campaign
