= Anini =

- District Headquarters
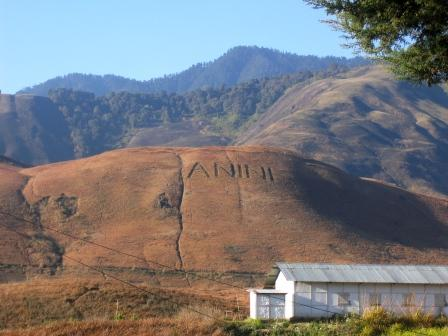
- Aerial view of Anini

- Location of Anini in Arunachal Pradesh Anini (India)
- Coordinates: 28°47′53″N 95°54′13″E
- Country: India
- State: Arunachal Pradesh
- District: Dibang Valley
- Sub-district: Anini Circle
- Elevation: 1,968 m (6,457 ft)

Population (2001)
  - Total: 2,264
- Demonym: Aninese
- Time zone: UTC+5:30 (Indian Standard Time)
- Postal Index Code (India): 792101
- Indian Telephone Prefix: 03801
- ISO 3166 code: IN
- Climate: Cwb

Anini is the headquarters of the Dibang Valley district in the state of Arunachal Pradesh in Northeast India. Anini was also the district headquarters of the undivided Dibang Valley district. Most of this location's population consists of the Idu Mishmi tribal people. Due to its remote location, Anini remains a small and underdeveloped town. However, it has basic road and air links to the rest of India. For most commercial needs, the town is fully dependent on the nearest major settlement, Roing, which is in the Lower Dibang Valley District.

The Anini sub-division consists of six administrative circles— Anini, Mipi, Dambeun, Etalin, Anelih, and Arzoo.

== Etymology ==
While there is no definite answer, Anini's name may have come from Inini or Innini. Historical maps of Arunachal Pradesh from times before the Lower Dibang Valley district were carved out of the Dibang Valley District in 2001. Before Roing was established, these maps indicate the capital of the Dibang Valley District was "Inini." Inini may have come from the Idu word "inni," which is the word for the Idu Mishmi people's supreme deity or god.

== History ==
Like the history of Arunachal Pradesh, Anini's history is cloudy. The native Idu Mishmi and other tribes were said to have migrated from ancient Tibet in the 1st or 1st millennium BC. They have been believed to have stopped in Lhoyu. Lhoyu became under Tibetan control around the 7th century. Although inhabited by Idu Mishmis in all that time, it took until the times of NEFA and the British Raj for Anini to be officially established. Anini's importance grew during World War II, when supplies and troops needed to be sent to China through the Ledo Road in Assam. In 1947, Anini became a part of India. At this point the Republic of China was free to claim most of Arunachal, making it and Aksai Chin under dispute. The People's Republic of China emerged in 1949, and once the British left in 1950, Arunachal and Aksai Chin were under dispute. Since then, they have remained disputed. In June 1980, the Dibang Valley district was finally carved out of the Lohit District, and Anini was pronounced its capital. Since then, Anini has been the only district headquarters without proper road links to the rest of India.

== Geography ==
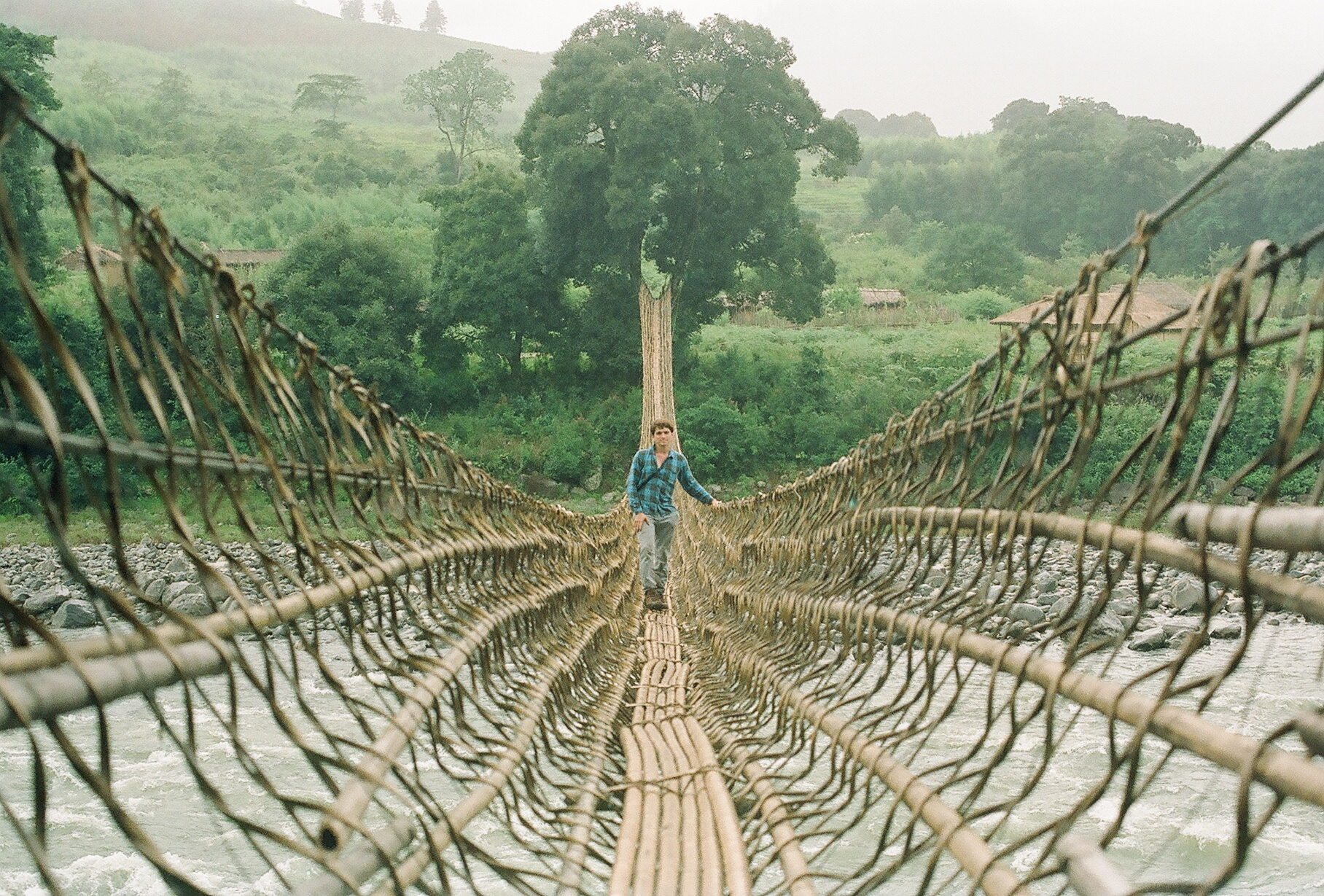
Cane bridge over the Dri River

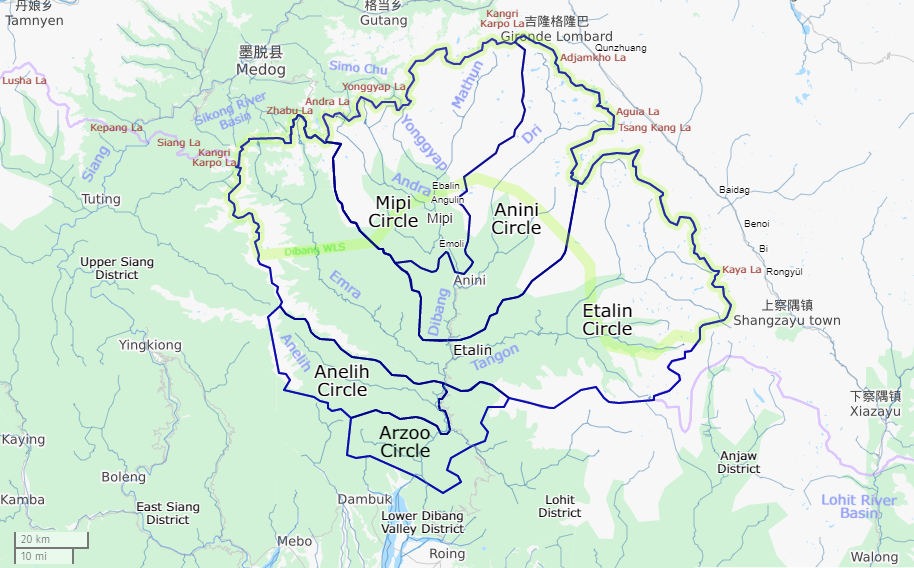
Dibang District Valley with Anini and Anini circle

Most of Anini is located on a miniature plateau between two tributaries of the Dibang river, the Dri river and the Mathun river. The town has a subdistrict of its own: Anini Circle. As of the 2011 Census of India, there were 4,489 people living in Anini Circle. Its location just south of the Dibang Wildlife Sanctuary makes Anini the northernmost district headquarters in Northeast India.

=== Elevation ===
The small settlement of Anini is located at an elevation of 1,615 metres (5,299 ft) above sea level. On the Aninese Plateau, the average elevation is 1,800 meters, but the average elevation of the town is 2,068 meters. According to Google Maps' terrain feature, Anini is around 1,600–1,800 meters above sea level and up north of Anini, the elevation can go up to 3,800 meters above sea level. According to the official website of the Dibang Valley District, Anini's altitude is at 1,968 meters above sea level.

=== Earthquakes ===
Anini is located on the Eurasian Plate, about 420 miles north of the junction of the Indian Plate and the Eurasian Plate, which makes Anini earthquake-prone. The 1950 Assam–Tibet earthquake badly affected both the Dibang and Lower Dibang Valleys. 70% of the residents of the area died in this earthquake. On 2 June 2005 at 01:36 AM IST, a 5.7 magnitude earthquake hit the Upper Dibang Valley district. Although there were not any casualties reported, landslides blocked communication between Anini and other villages in the district. The seismic upheaval was felt all around Arunachal Pradesh and in some areas of Tibet.

=== Mountains ===
The closest mountain to Anini is relatively unnoticed. Its name, Kelingon was named by the local Midu Idus. Also there is another mountain. Kahaii Kala, which peaks at around 5,000 meters above sea level, is the highest around the region. Like Kelingon, it was named by the locals.

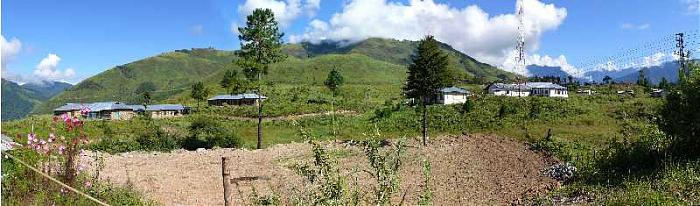
Panorama of the town of Anini

== Climate ==
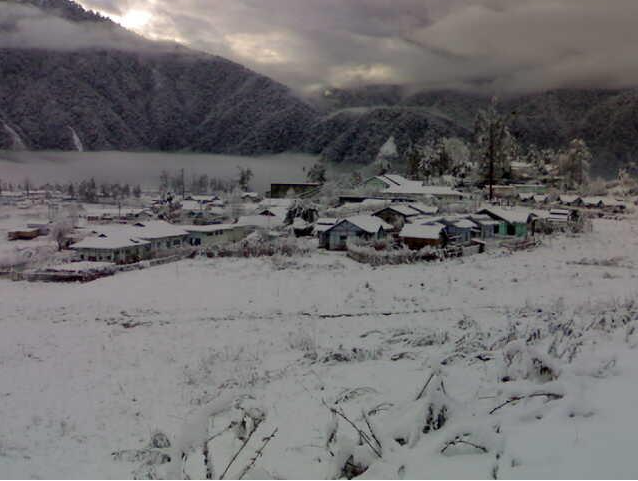
Anini in winter, with snowfall

Anini's climate varies by elevation. In the lower elevations, the climate is humid subtropical. In the climate around the plateau, it is temperate. Anini is within the monsoon zone and receives both the southwest monsoon of South Asia and the northeast monsoon of East Asia. During the May–October time, Anini receives 80% of its precipitation. Snowfall is common in the winter, and can become quite heavy (6m - 10m) in the mountains.

== Language ==
The main language of Anini is the Midu Dialect of the Idu Mishmi Language. Midu is the northernmost dialect of the Idu Mishmi Language. The Midu Dialect is only spoken in Anini. Soon, government officials will start using the Idu Azobra script, a script proposed by the Roing MLA, Laeta Umbrey, that aims to preserve the endangered language.

== Demographics ==
Anini has a population of 2,264 people living in 613 households as of 2001. Of those 2,264 people, 1,331 are males and 933 are females. Due to its small population, Anini is not yet a census town, needing about 3,000 more people to qualify. However, Anini may become a consensus town sooner than anticipated, due to the Dibang Valley district's high population growth rate of 33.61 permille (as of 2001). Idu Mishmis, also known as Yidu Lhoba in China, are the main inhabitants of the district.

== Infrastructure ==
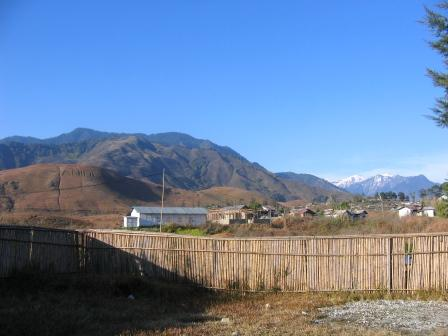
Buildings of Anini, seen across a fence

Although remote, the town has basic infrastructure. There is a government hospital, district library, police station, and accommodation for visitors in the Circuit House. The two schools in Anini are the Government Higher Secondary School of Anini, a school run by the Government of Arunachal Pradesh and affiliated to the Central Board of Secondary Education (CBSE) that has 450 students on roll, and Jawahar Navodaya Vidalaya, which is also a hostel for students. Dr. Saga Migri is the medical superintendent at the hospital. which is used by the Arunachal Helicopter Service for transportation and by other helicopters bringing in supplies from Roing.

=== Airports ===
The nearest airport from Anini is the Tezu Airport, about 300 km by road. The easiest way to get to Anini is through the Dibrugarh Airport (through Guwahati airport), though it is unlikely that Anini will get an airport closer than Itanagar anytime soon due to the sparse population.

=== Construction and development ===
There is a steel arch bridge under construction over the River Dri (Dibang River) near Anini. The 135-meter span bridge will have a single lane carriage-way with thrust blocks at each end. It will be sponsored by the Public Works Department of Arunachal Pradesh and by Damodar Ropeways and Construction (Calcutta).

The state government mentioned in the 2005-2006 Annual Plan about the:

- "Infrastructure development of Government Higher Secondary School at Anini."
- "Improvement of Township Road network at Anini."
- "Infrastructure development of District Hospital at Anini."

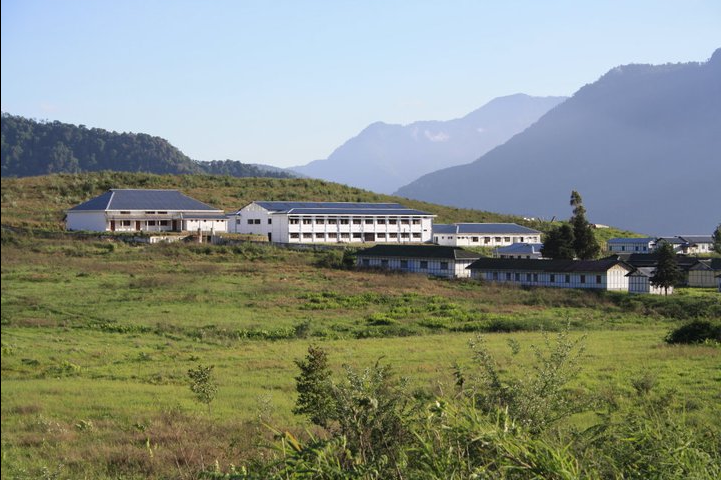
The new building of the Government Higher Secondary School of Anini

As a matter of fact, the new building of the higher secondary school greatly improved, to an extent of being considered the finest school in the state. Although this is a major milestone in the improvement of amenities at Anini, the town has a long way to go in order to become reasonably developed.

There is also a dam being constructed. The Dibang Valley Dam, also known as the Dibang Dam, will not seriously affect Anini since it is in the Lower Dibang Valley. It is approximately 43 kilometers from Roing, at Munli. The Dibang Dam, once completed in 2017, will be the tallest concrete gravity dam in the world. The dam will also be the tallest dam in India, at 288 meters tall. It will also have the largest amount of power generation. Also, a meeting has taken place at Anini to discuss the quick start of a new highway from Roing to Anini. This project is under the Special Accelerated Road Development Programme (SARDP) which is run by the Ministry of Road Transport and Highways of India. It will run through the dam site at Munli, which will shorten the existing 228-kilometer Roing-Anini Highway by 89 kilometers. The government officials and the local Panchayat leaders who were present at the meeting endorsed the plan. After the road is completed, the Dibang area would socioeconomically and constructively boost. This road will also connect with Hunli, Munli, Chidu, and Alopa. The Rs 6 billion two-lane highway will run through Roing Bazaar, from Meka, and will secure Anini with good connectivity with the rest of India.

=== Arunachal Helicopter Service ===
The Arunachal Helicopter Service makes several stops to Anini, connecting Anini to the rest of Arunachal and the Dibrugarh Airport in Assam. Anini is a main stop in both the Eurocopter Dauphin and the MI-172 helicopters' schedule. The helicopter service is a branch off of Pawan Hans, which is responsible for supplying the helicopters.

=== Protests of neglect ===
Although these efforts are being made to improve the infrastructure in Anini, the Arunachal Times newspaper claims that Anini has been neglected due to "frequent communication disruption and deteriorating health conditions." The Government Higher Secondary School hasn't had either a principle or a vice-president for two years. A similar situation is present with the Jawohar Navodaya Vidalaya school in Anini. The All Idu Mishmi Students Union (AIMSU) as well as the Dibang Valley Students Union|Dibang Valley Students Union (DVSU) are protesting about the apparent miserable conditions in Anini. The AIMSU secretary Rajiv Mihu feels that, "None of the government employees want to serve in the remote district. The people of Dibang Valley aren't scaring them away. It is the pitiful living conditions that are driving them away." The government responded to the situation by assuring the protesters that the required number of teachers will be hired, and a new vice principal and principal will be deputed. "Anini is neglected politically," commented Mihu. "Similar protest action in Roing would have shaken the political corridors of Itanagar."

== Dibang Wildlife Sanctuary ==
The Dibang Wildlife Sanctuary, is located just north of Anini and was established in 1992. The region is very mountainous, and snowfall is common in this region. It is protected by the Department of Environment and Forest of Arunachal Pradesh. The altitude ranges from an absolute low of 1800 meters to the peak of Kalaii Kala at 5000 meters. Some infrastructure that you may find are the forest rest house and a hiking trail.

=== Flora ===
The vegetation of Arunachal ranges from temperate to alpine. Temperate broadleaf forests and Eastern Himalayan broadleaf forests are found around 1800–2800 meters above sea level and 2800–3500 meters above sea level is where the temperate coniferous forests are found. Alpine forests are found at an altitude off 3500+ meters and are mostly covered in snow year round. Some other plants that are found include Bamboo, Tsuga, and Abies.

=== Fauna ===
The Dibang Wildlife Sanctuary is rich in wildlife. Rare mammals such as Mishmi takin, Red goral, Musk deer (at least two species), Red panda, Asiatic black bear, occasional Tiger and Gongshan muntjac occurs while among birds there is the rare Sclater's monal and Blyth's Tragopan. A flying squirrel new to science has been recently discovered from the edge of this sanctuary. It has been named as Mishmi Hills Giant Flying Squirrel Petaurista mishmiensis.

== Politics ==
=== Arunachal Pradesh Assembly Election ===
==== 2004-09,14 ====
The winning candidate for the position of the MLA of Anini was Shri Rajesh Tacho, winning 41.57 percent of the 3038 valid votes in 2004. There were actually 4741 voters, even though Anini's population is only 2264 people. He had a lead margin of 260 and a total number of 1263. He is a part of the Indian National Congress Party. Also, he was re-elected in 2009, barely beating Eri Tayu of the Nationalist Congress Party by 81 votes. Tacho also was nominated as Chairman of the Committee of the Arunachal Pradesh Legislative Assembly on Balanced Development of CD Blocks in Arunachal Pradesh, replacing Shri Lombo Tayeng, who has resigned after his induction into the Council of Ministers, otherwise known as the Cabinet of Arunachal Pradesh.

== Claims ==
Anini sits near the McMahon Line, the disputed northern boundary of Arunachal Pradesh, previously referred to as the North-East Frontier Agency. The Chinese government has never accepted the McMahon line as a legitimate boundary and refers to the region as South Tibet. Sovereignty over the territory south of the McMahon line was the apparent cause of the 1962 Sino-Indian War.

=== Alternative names ===
Due to the competing claims by China and India, Anini has many different names.

- Anini (Indian)
- Giannini (formal to China)
- Annini (informal to China)
- 安尼尼 (Simplified Chinese characters)
- 阿尼尼 (Chinese)
- Ilupu (possibly native)
- Inini or Innini, old name, used in the times of NEFA, before Roing was established.

== See also ==
- Border Dispute
- Sino-Indian War
