= Etalin =

- Village
- Location of Anini in India. Etalin (India)
- Coordinates: 28.608°N 95.87205°E
- Country: India
- State: Arunachal Pradesh
- District: Dibang Valley
- Elevation: 1,968 m (6,457 ft)

Population (2001)
  - Total: 314
- Time zone: UTC+5:30 (Indian Standard Time)
- ISO 3166 code: IN-AR

Etalin is a village and the headquarters of an eponymous circle (subdistrict) in the Dibang Valley district in the Indian state of Arunachal Pradesh. It is a rest stop used by those taking the route to Anini or Malinye. Etalin is approximately 52 km from Anini and approximately 42 km from Malinye. The nearest hospital is the Anini General Hospital.There is one middle school in Etalin and for further study students have to move to Anini High Secondary School or Roing High Secondary School. The nearest airport is in Assam (Mohanbari).

== Etalin Circle ==
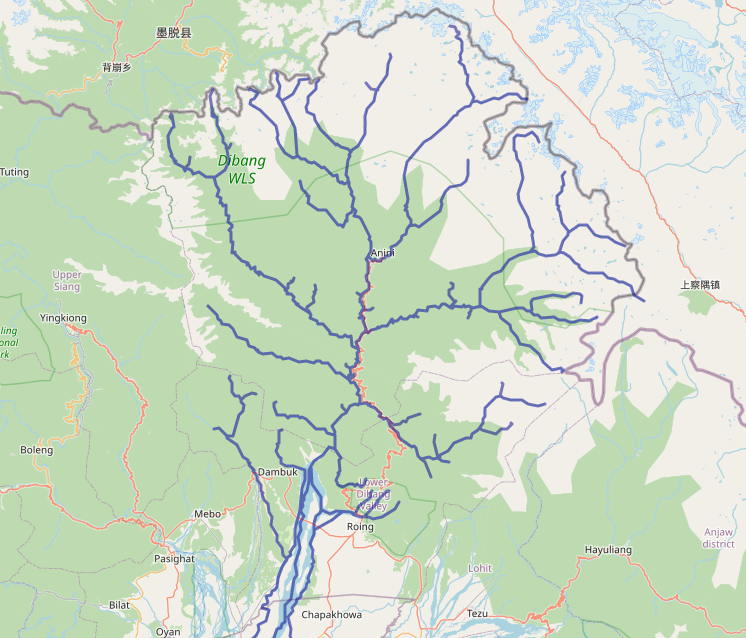

The Etalin Circle, also regarded as the Etalin–Malinye CD block, includes two river valleys, that of the Emra River flowing from the west and the Tangot River flowing from the east. Both the rivers drain into the Dibang River near Etalin. Malinye is the principal village of the Tangot river valley.

The Etalin Circle has a population of 1,329 people living in 293 households.

- The Emra river valley has the villages: Aranli, Eran, Ambolin, Enda, Endalji, Aruli, Erali and Eagapo.
- The Tangot river valley has the villages: Manlinye, Awali, Apuli, Agoso, Echanli, Akuli, Ellepo, Lalu Pani, Edilin, Mawaisi, Anoso, Aroko, Anon Pani, Edilin, Mawali, Anoso, Aroko, Anon Pani, Chanli, Athunli, Aunli, Amchi, Aningo, and Etalin itself.
- Additional villages in the Dibang river valley are Alolin, Apunli and Angolin.

== Sources ==
- dibang-valley-anni/etalin/etalin-google-earth.kml
