= Mipi =

- Village
- Nickname: Mipido
- Location in Arunachal Pradesh, India Mipi (India)
- Coordinates: 28.950°N 95.814°E
- Country: India
- State: Arunachal Pradesh
- District: Dibang Valley
- Sub-division: Anini
- Block: Mipi-Anini-Alinye
- Circle: Mipi
- Elevation: 1,340 m (4,400 ft)

Population (2011)
  - Total: 170
- Time zone: UTC+5:30 (IST)

Mipi is a village and the headquarters of the Mipi Circle in the Dibang Valley district of the Indian state of Arunachal Pradesh. Mipi HQ is located near the confluence of Andra River with the Mathun or Dibang River. The main Mipi village, called Mipido, is 2 km to the south.

== Geography ==
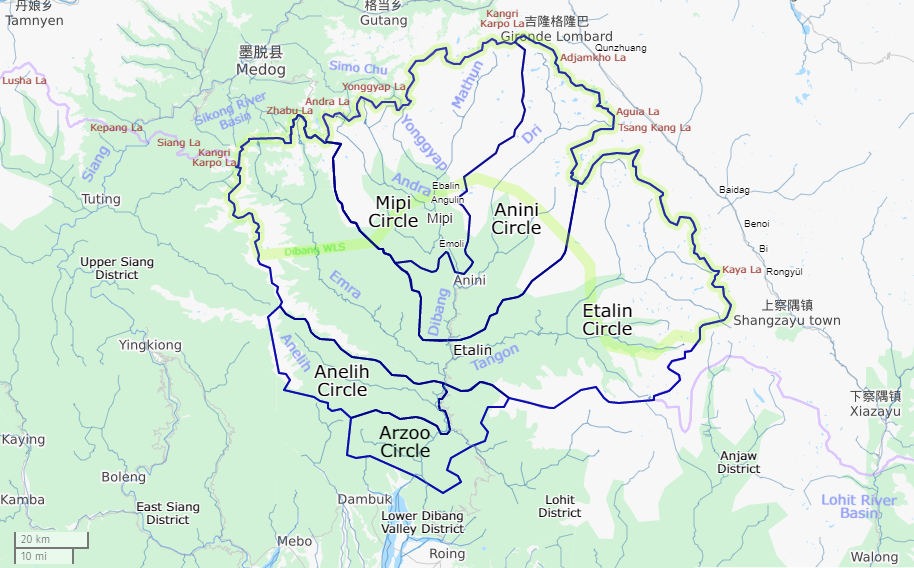
Map of the Mipi Circle among other subdivisions of the Dibang Valley district

The village of Mipi is on the bank of the Mathun River (the upper course of the Dibang River), where the Andra River joins the Mathun. Wedged between the two rivers is the Mipi mountain, with its peak rising to 2,155 metres (7,070 ft).

A village of Mipi is immediately to the south of the Andra River (which is also called the Mipi River in this area). It goes by the name of Mipi HQ and contains the Indian border security post. The main Mipi village is about 2 km to the south, called Mipido ("Lower Mipi") in Tibetan. Adjacent to it is another village called Brango. All three villages together contain a population of about 170 people.

The area is populated by Idu Mishmi people. In early 20th century, a number of Tibetan people from across the border attempted to settle here, coming in search of the famed holy land of Pemako. They were unsuccessful, but Tibetan influence continues to live on in the valley.

villages of the Mipi Circle

== History ==
Frederick Marshman Bailey passed through Mipi in March 1913. He describes the presence of Tibetans who had, years before, supposedly travelled in search of Pemako. Unsuccessful, they started returning to Tibet in 1909. By 1913, when Bailey visited Mipi, only those too old or ill to make the journey back to Tibet remained. They were soon wiped out by the Idu. Mipi has historically seen conflict between the Khamba and Idu tribes. In 2017 British traveller Antonia Bolingbroke-Kent passed through Mipi, "Now Mipi was a tiny Idu settlement, just a few houses and a helipad splayed over a grassy spur above the river, girdled by an arc of trees."

== Demographics ==
Mipi HQ has a population of 19 by the 2011 census. The sub-district, Mipi Circle, has 102 households. Anini Circle and Mipi Circle together make up the Anini-Mipi community development block. Following administrative changes, the block has been changed to Mipi-Anini-Alinye, adding Dambeun circle.

Administrative hierarchy
District	Sub-division	Block	Circle	Villages
Dibang Valley district	Anini	Mipi-Anini-Alinye	Mipi	Adali, Biyanli, Brango, Charkilo Tapo, Ebeli, Elambro, Emuli, Egulin, Maro, Maronli, Mipi, Mipi HQ, Mipido

Tourist locations include Mathun Valley.

== Maps ==
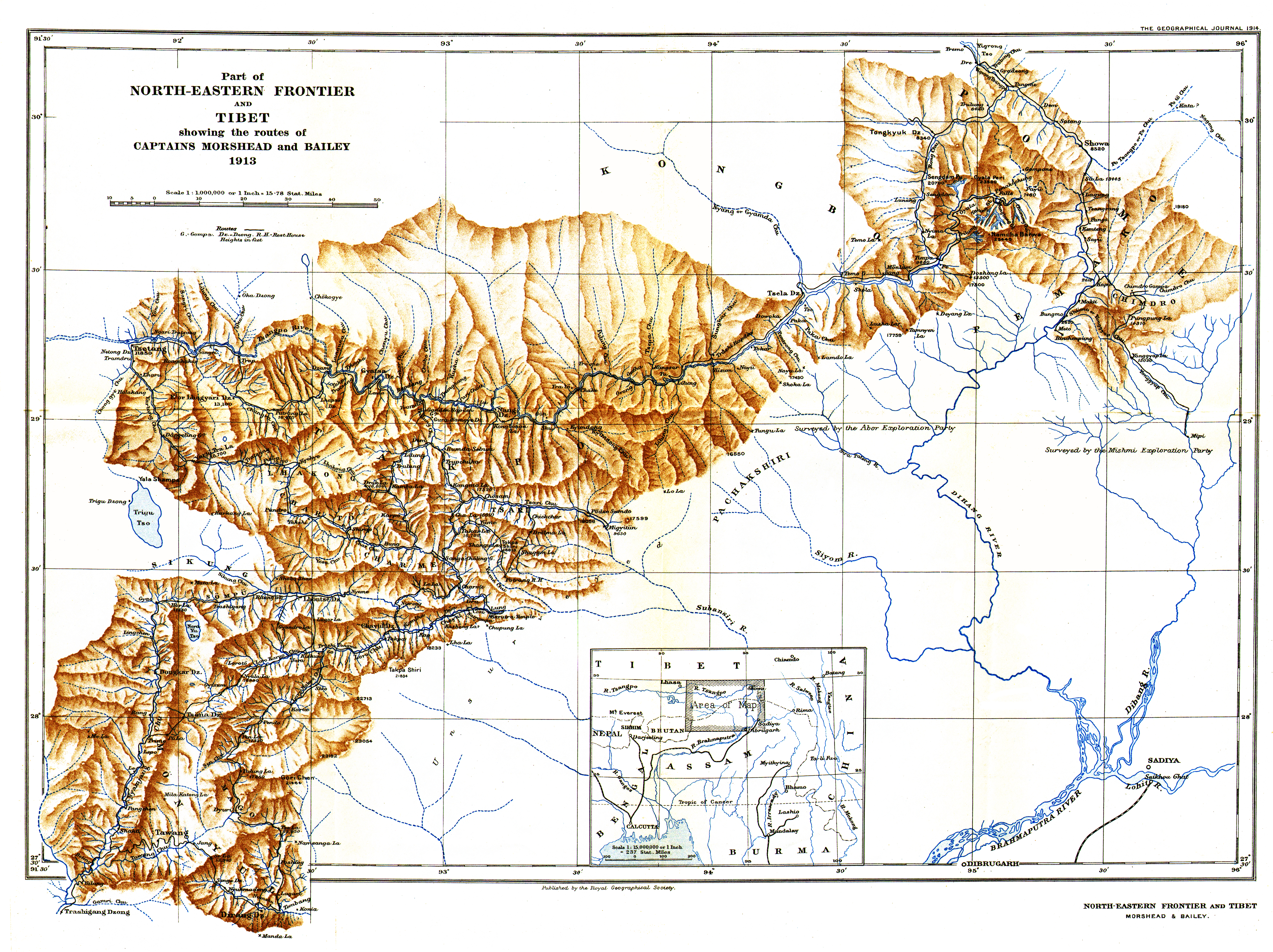
Mipi by Morshead and Bailey, 1914

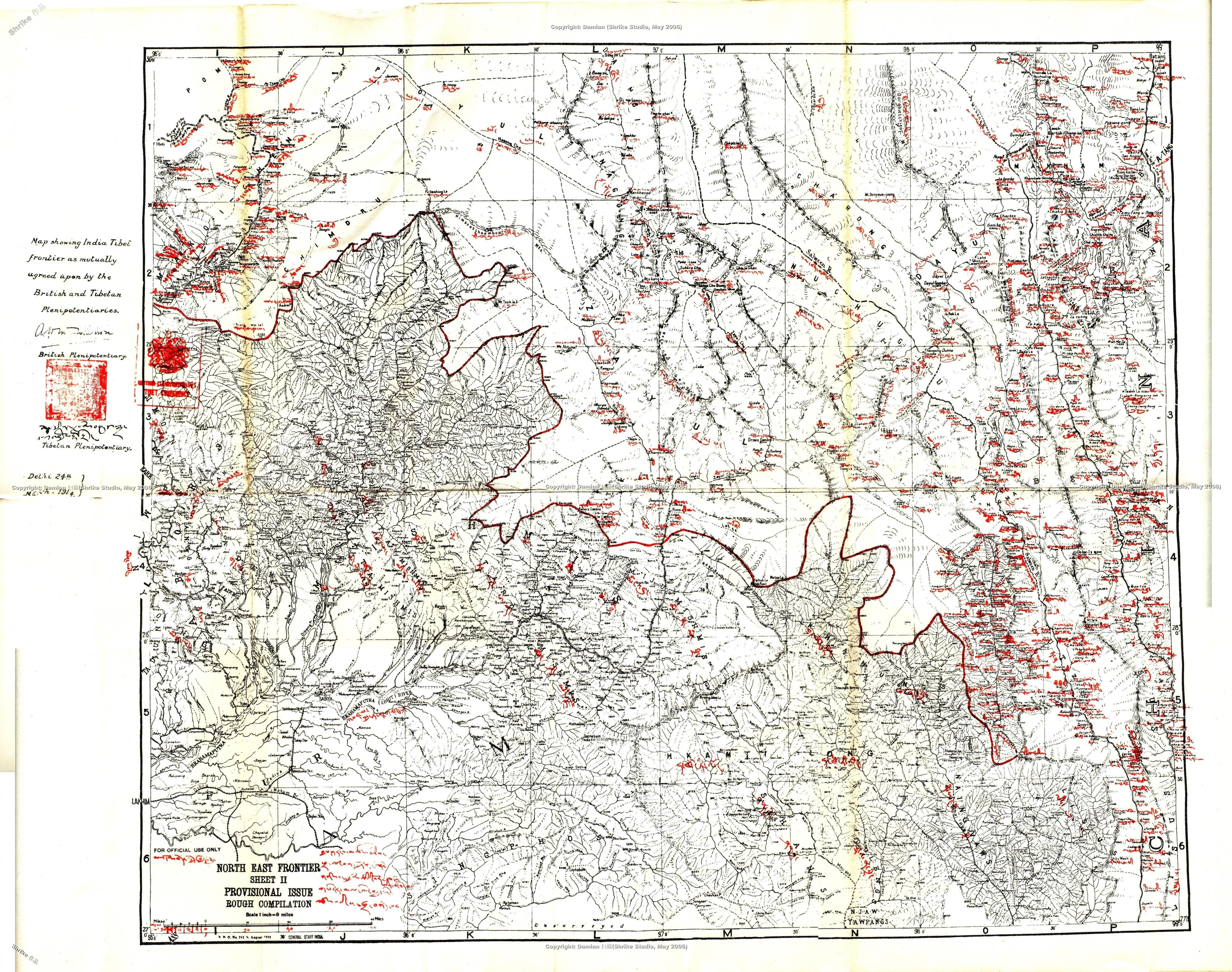
Mipi on the Simla Accord Treaty map, 1914

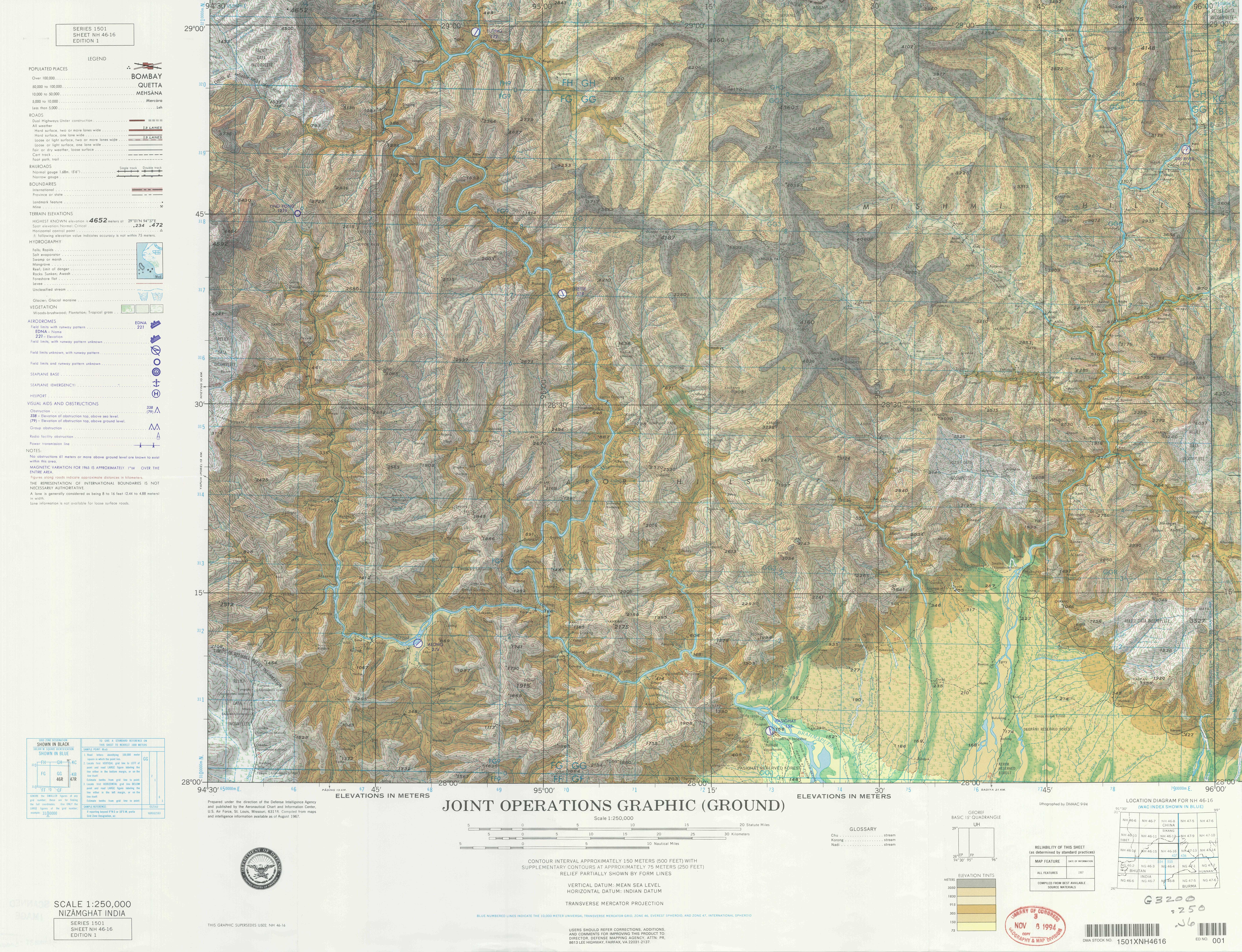
Mipi on a 1967 US Defense Mapping Agency map
