= Emra River =

River in Arunachal Pradesh, India

Emra
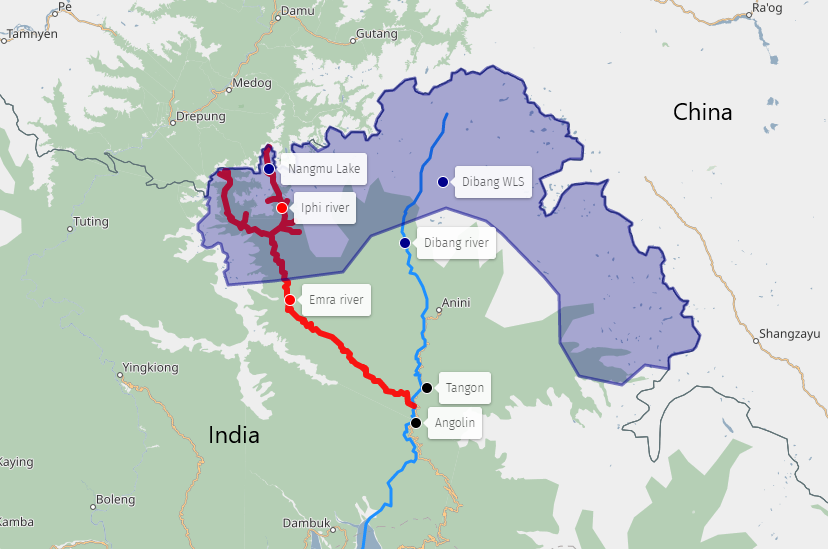
- The Emra highlighted in red

Physical characteristics
- Source
  - coordinates: 29.1236°N 95.3167°E
- 2nd source
  - coordinates: 29.1257°N 95.4417°E
- Mouth: Dibang River
  - coordinates: 28.56568°N 95.83698°E
- Length: 93 km (58 mi)

Basin features
- Tributaries
  - left: Chandro Pani, Iphi river, Yan Pani, Apoga Pani, Apogayaro Pani, Apili Pani and others
  - right: Pabu Pani, Chiciyakuni Pani, Maha Pani, Pubu Pani, Ekunji Pani, Apusu Pani and others

Emra River is a right-bank tributary of the Dibang River which eventually flows into the Brahmaputra River. The entire valley of the river is contained in the Etalin Circle of the Dibang Valley district in the state of Arunachal Pradesh.

The river originates near the India-China Line of Actual Control in Arunachal Pradesh at an elevation of about 4000 m. The Emra watershed/catchment area has a forest cover of 87% with high species richness and low habitat fragmentation. The Mishmi people live in the river valley/basin area. Fish such as mahseer (Tor putitora) migrate from the Dibang into the Emra for spawning and breeding.
