= Neoserica sladeni =

Scientific classification
- Kingdom: Animalia
- Phylum: Arthropoda
- Class: Insecta
- Order: Coleoptera
- Suborder: Polyphaga
- Infraorder: Scarabaeiformia
- Family: Scarabaeidae
- Genus: Neoserica
- Species: N. sladeni

Binomial name
- Neoserica sladeni Ahrens, 2004

Species of beetle

Neoserica sladeni is a species of beetle of the family Scarabaeidae. It is found in the Mishmi Hills (Assam).

== Description ==
Adults reach a length of about 9.3 mm. They have a dark reddish-brown, elongate-oval body. The upper surface is dull (except for the legs and the forehead), and almost completely glabrous, with only some setae on the pronotum and along the elytral margins.

== Etymology ==
The species is named for its collector, Percy Sladen.
