= Roing =

- Town
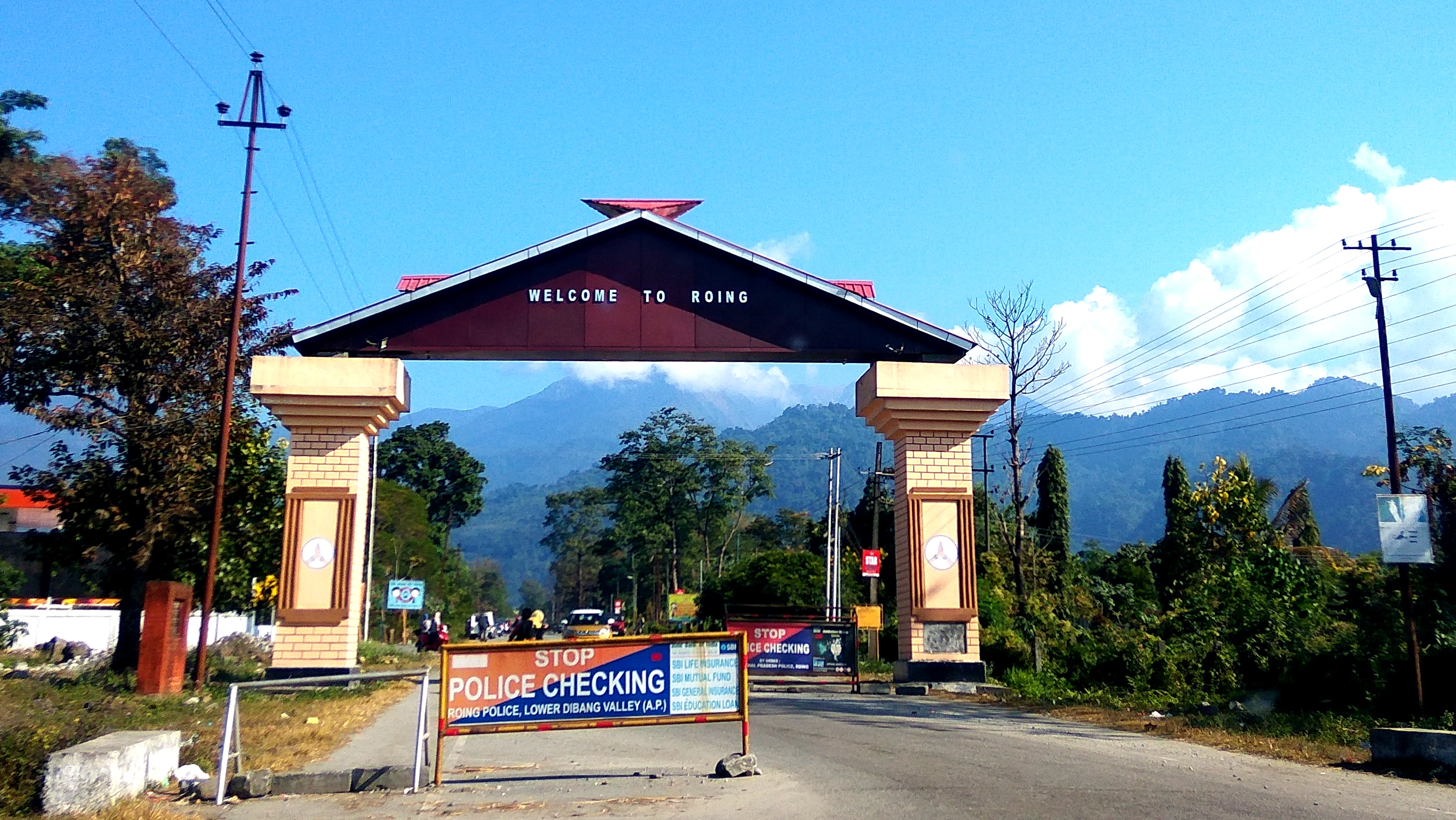
- Entrance to Roing

- Location in Arunachal Pradesh, India Roing (India)
- Coordinates: 28°8′34″N 95°50′34″E
- Country: India
- State: Arunachal Pradesh
- District: Lower Dibang Valley
- Elevation: 390 m (1,280 ft)

Population (2011)
  - Total: 11,389
- Time zone: UTC+5:30 (IST)
- Postal code: 792110
- ISO 3166 code: IN-AR
- Vehicle registration: AR-16
- Climate: Cwa
- Website: Official website

Roing is the district headquarter of Lower Dibang Valley district in the Indian state of Arunachal Pradesh. It is the last major township at the north-eastern frontier of India.

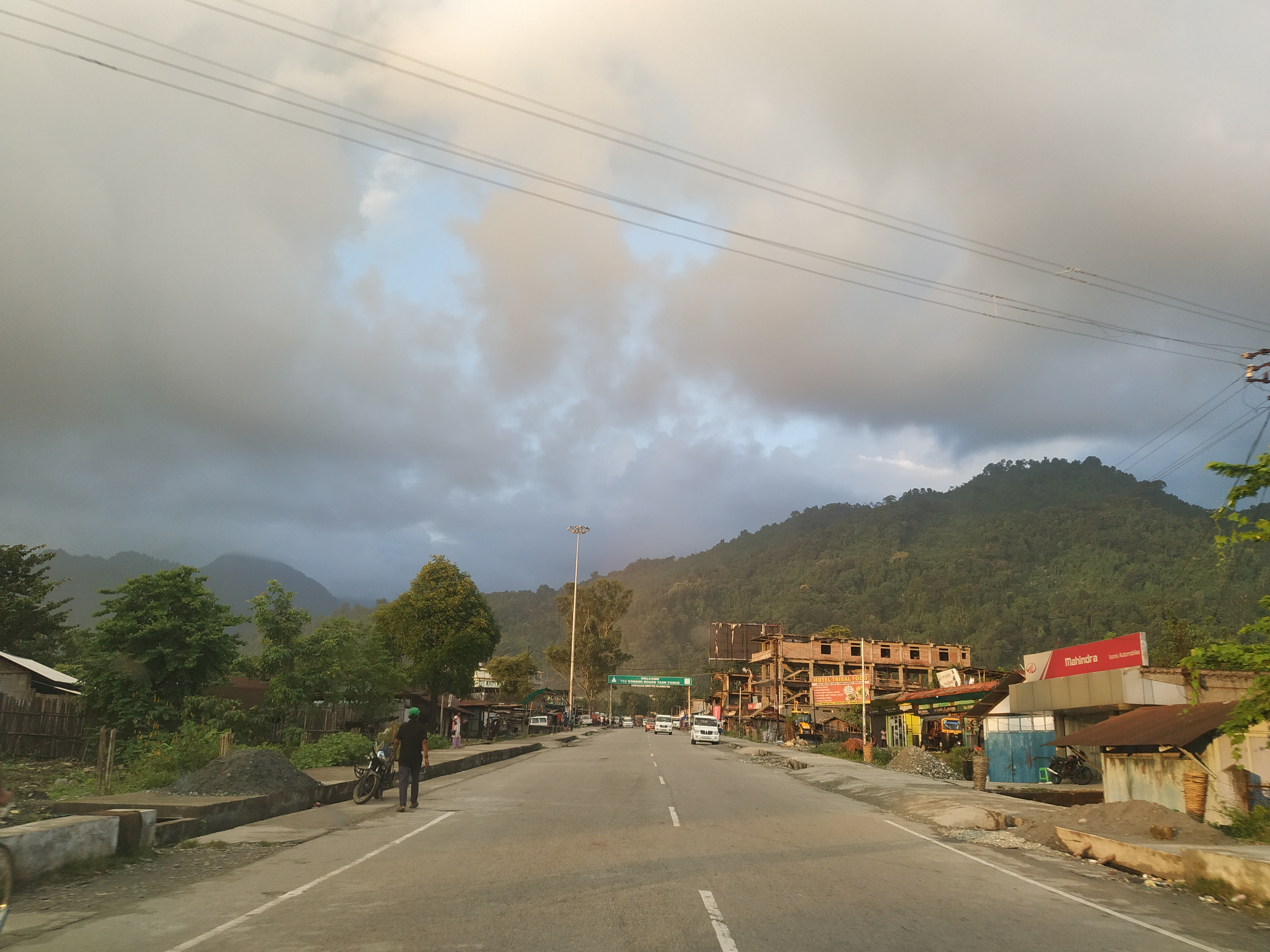
Roing town entrance

== Demographics ==
As of 2011 India census, Roing had a population of 11,389 of which 6,064 are males and 5,325 females. Roing has an average literacy rate of 88.39%, higher than the national average of 65.38%: male literacy is 91.94%, and female literacy 84.35%. The population of children age 0-6 is 1157, constituting 10.16% of the total population of Roing.

The female Sex Ratio is 878 against the state average of 938. Moreover, the child sex ratio in Roing is around 875 compared to the Arunachal Pradesh state average of 972.

Roing has total administration over 2,617 houses to which it supplies basic amenities like water and sewerage.

Both Mishmi (Idu)and Adi are the principal indigenous dwellers of Roing. Notable tourist attractions are Mehao wild life sanctuary, Sally lake, Mehao lake, Bhismaknagar Fort and Mayodia pass which remains covered with snow during peak winter. The town is located at the foothill of the Mishmi Hills. Reh festival of Idu in 1 February every year while Adi People Celebrate Solung with great joy and harmony. Towards the north flows the river Deopani that frequently floods in summer causing great economic blockade to the adjoining Dibang Valley District. Bridges over it have been repeatedly washed away draining Government's exchequer. Towards the south and east are the villages of Mishmi (Idu) and Adi extend up to Assam border. The town is the only commercial hub for Upper Dibang Valley District and the adjoining Villages under it.

Unlike other rough terrain towns of Arunachal Pradesh, Roing is geographically plain with a lot of land for farming and cultivation.

It is under the 43rd assembly constituency [ST] of the 60 constituencies in Legislative Assembly of Arunachal Pradesh. Current MLA (23-05-2019 to till date) of Roing constituency is Mutchu Mithi

=== Languages ===
Languages spoken in Roing Town (2011)
1. Nepali (19.4%)
2. Bengali (14.9%)
3. Adi (12.5%)
4. Mismi (11.9%)
5. Bhojpuri (11.6%)
6. Assamese (7.60%)
7. Hindi (7.02%)
8. Others (15.1%)

According to Census 2011, Nepali is Spoken by 2,216 people, Bengali at 1,694 people, Adi language by 1,424, Mismi by 1,358 people, Bhojpuri by 1,307 people, Assamese at 866 and Hindi at 799.

== Transport ==
Roing is connected to Tinsukia, a major town of Assam, separated by the mighty Brahmaputra river which is the major route. During summer the river floods which takes a three-hour journey via ferry-boat which is quite an experience to have. The recently inaugurated Dhola-Sadiya bridge (Dr. Bhupen Hazarika setu) over the Brahmaputra river has made the route to Roing much easier. Another route connecting Tinsukia is via Tezu-Chowkham-Namsai circuit which has two possible routes between Tezu and Chowkham-Namsai, they are all-season road links, one is the bridge over Lohit river at Parshuram Kund and another bridge at Alubari Ghat over the same Lohit River in Chowkham.

=== Road ===
Bus Routes Operated by APSTS, Roing and Private Transport Services:

1. Roing –Pasighat
2. Roing – Tezu
3. Roing – Hunli
4. Roing – Tezu
5. Roing – Rukmo
6. Roing – Koronu
7. Roing – Dambuk
8. Roing – Old Abali
9. Roing – Balek
10. Roing – Tinsukia
11. Roing – Anini (only Taxis)
12. Dambuk - Paglam

=== Railway ===
Nearest Railway Station:

• Tinsukia (New Tinsukia Junction railway station) : (113 km Approx.)

=== Airport ===
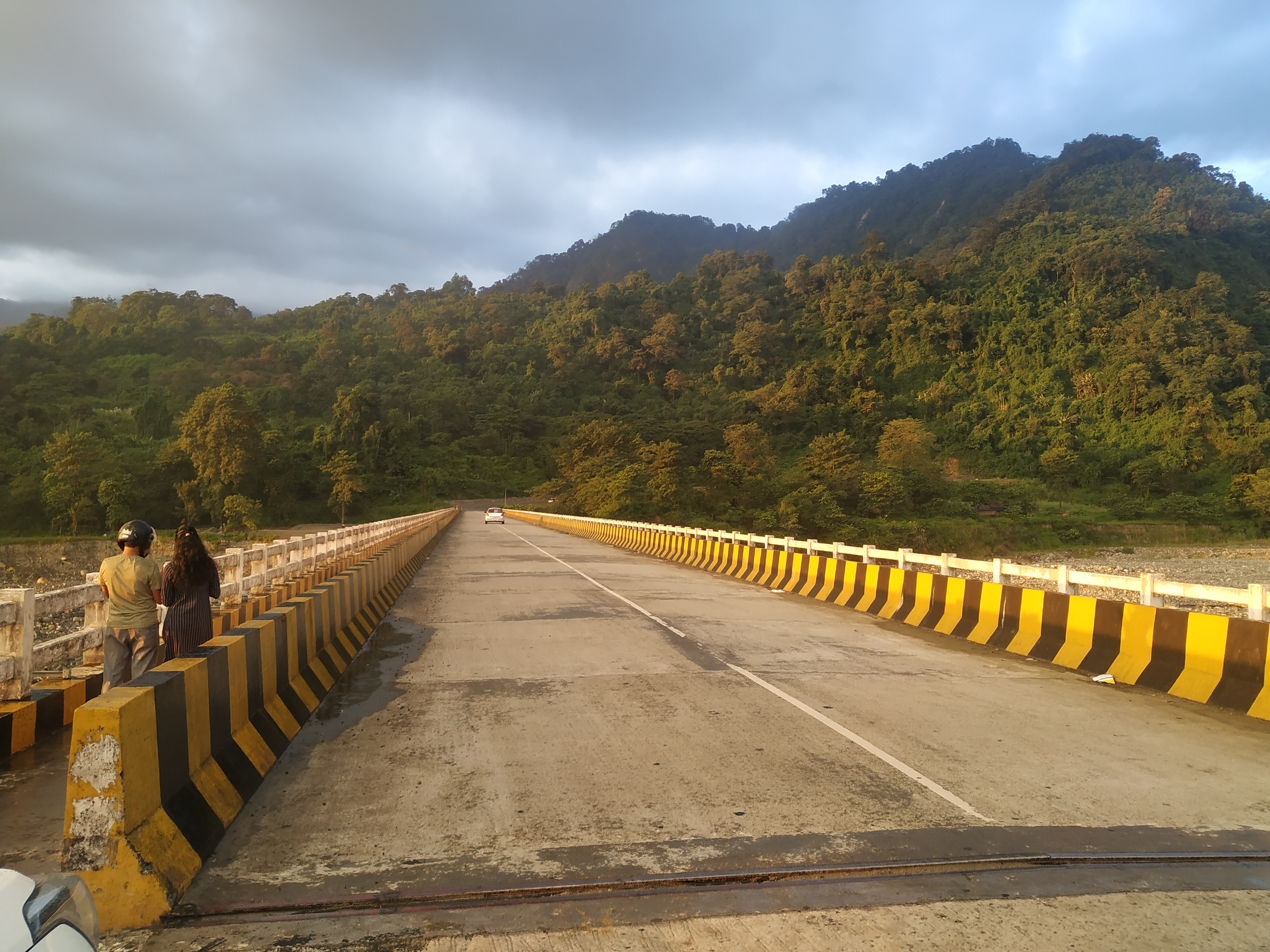
Deopani Bridge over river Eze, on the way to Mayudiya

Nearest Airport:

1. Tezu(Tezu) (59 km Approx.)
2. Chabua (138 km Approx.)
3. Mohanbari (Dibrugarh) (148 km Approx.)
4. Guwahati (500 km Approx.)
5. Pasighat (97 km Approx.)

== Bazaar ==
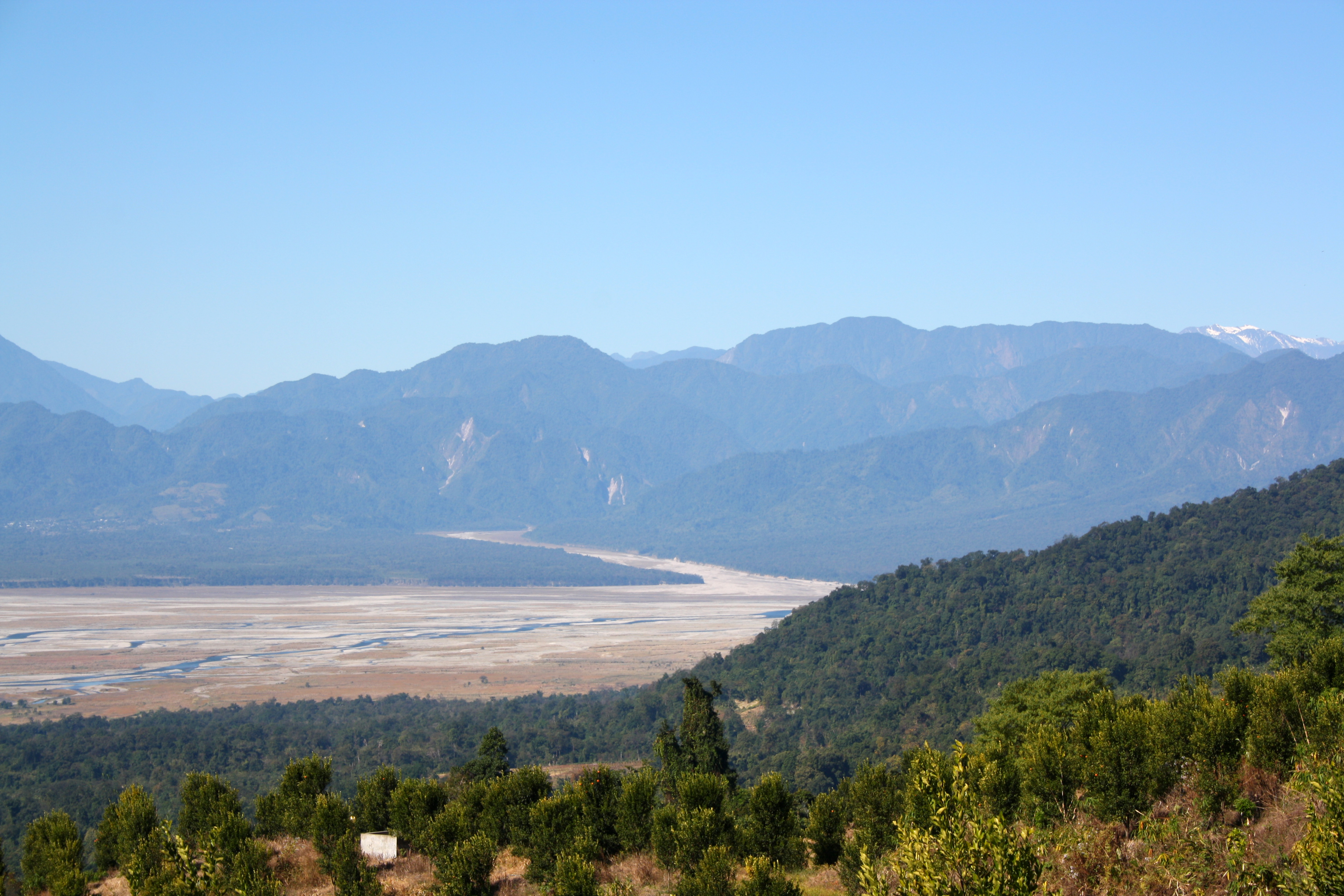
Dibang River View from Bara Golai, 16 km north of Roing, on the way to Mayudiya

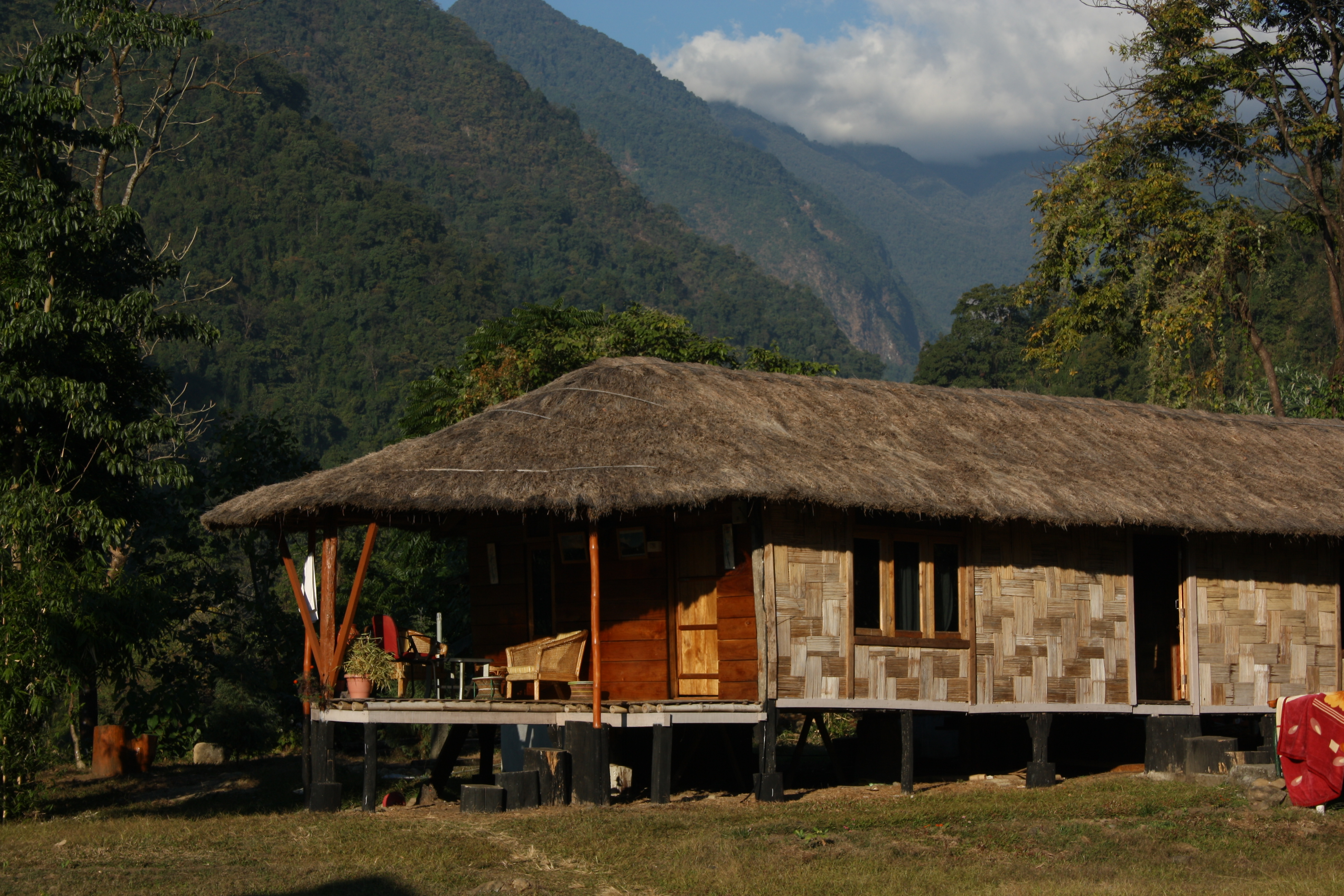
Mishmi Hills Resort at the bank of River Eze

The Roing Bazaar is the market where most residents buy and sell supplies and food. The proposed highway of the Special Accelerated Road Development Programme (SARDP) will run through the bazaar, possibly increasing customers.

== Media ==
Roing has an All India Radio Relay station known as Akashvani Roing. It broadcasts on FM frequencies. The town also offers few local newspapers like Dawnlit post, The Roing Times.
