= Mayodia Pass =

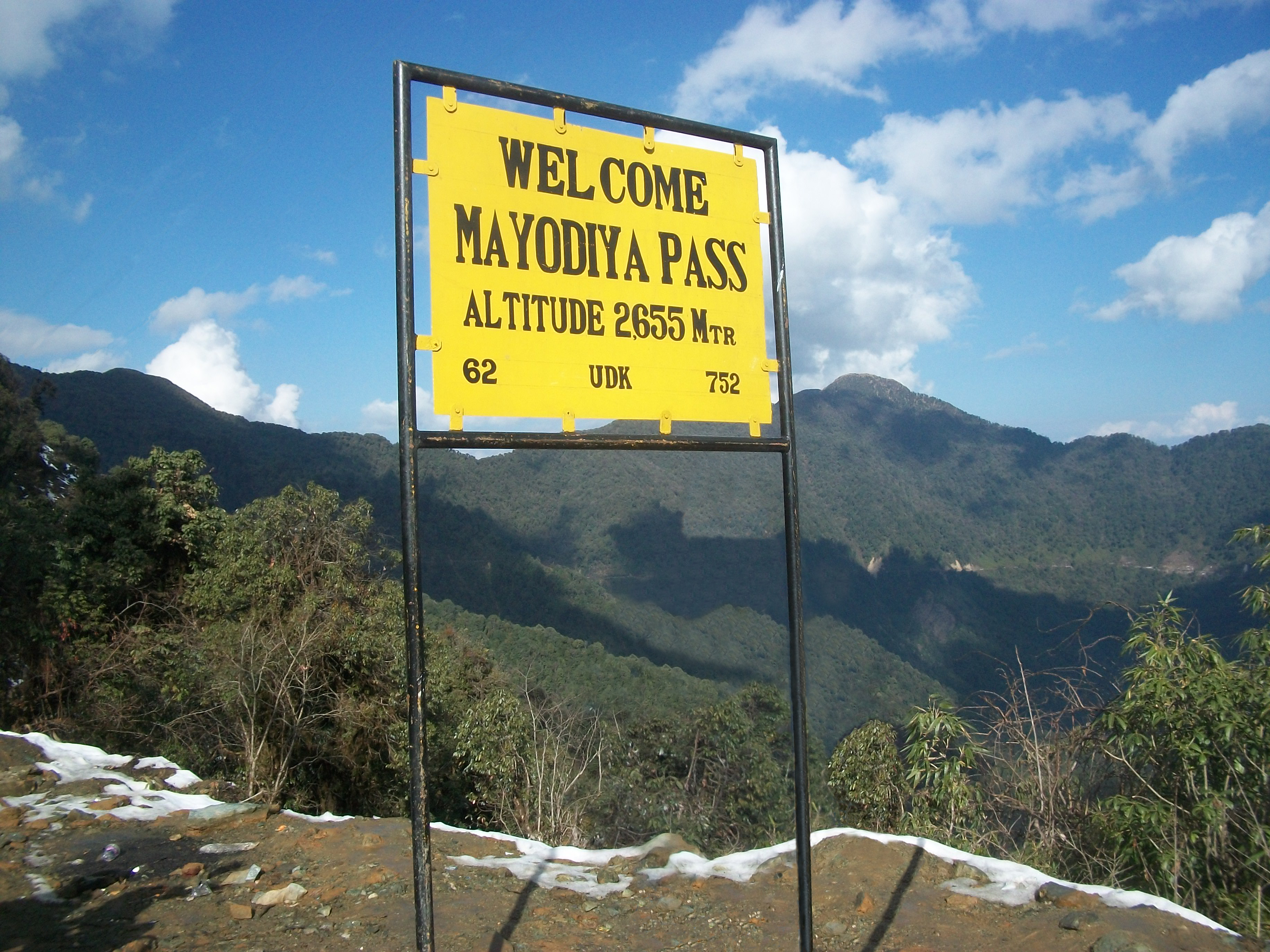
- Mayodia Pass
- Interactive map of Mayodia Pass
- Elevation: 2,655 metres (8,711 ft)

Location
- Location: Arunachal Pradesh, India
- Range: Himalaya

Mayodia Pass
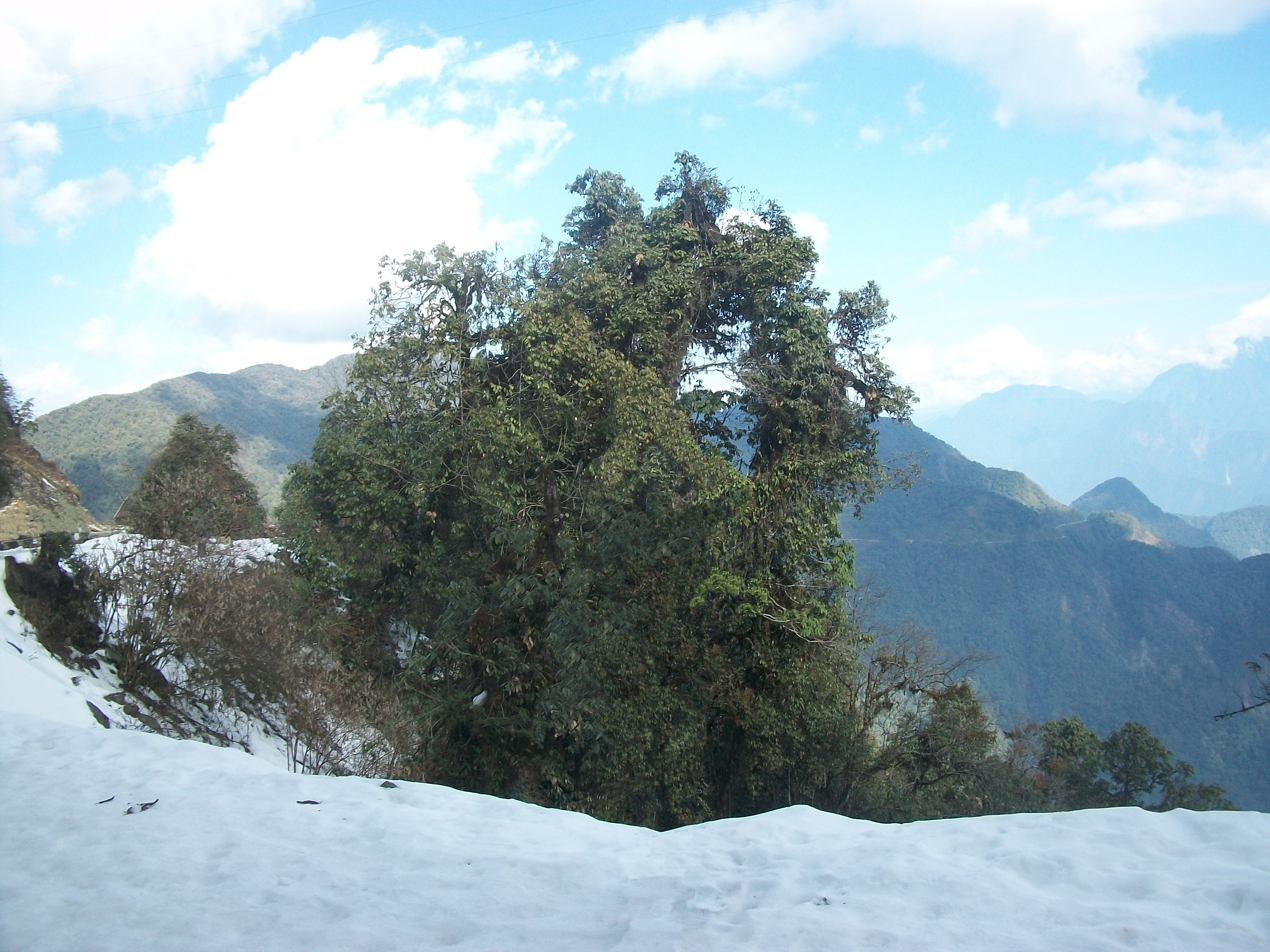
- Aerial view of Mayodia Pass

- Location of Mayodia in Arunachal Pradesh Mayodia Pass (India)
- Coordinates: 28°14′1″N 95°54′36″E
- Country: India
- State: Arunachal Pradesh
- District: Lower Dibang Valley District
- Head Quarter: Roing
- Time zone: UTC+5:30 (Indian Standard Time)
- Postal Index Code (India): 792110
- Indian Telephone Prefix: 03803
- ISO 3166 code: IN-AR

Mayodia Pass is a mountain pass in the Dibang Valley district of Arunachal Pradesh, India. It is a popular tourist attraction due to the November to March winter snow fall which is heaviest in January and February.

== Etymology ==
"Mayodia" is the combination of two Idu-Mishmi words – "Mayu", which is the name of the mountain, and "Dia", which means "peak of the mountain". It is a frequent domestic tourist attraction for the snow fall it receives during winters. Nearest town is Roing (56 km).

== Climate ==
Summer (March–June): The temperature ranges from 15 to 30 degree Celsius.

Monsoon (July–August) : Monsoon starts during the month of July. Visiting Mayodia during this time may be difficult due to unpredictable road condition.

Winter (October–January): It is the peak tourist season and the best time to visit Mayodia.

== Transport ==
=== Road ===
Mayodia can be easily reached by road from all major cities of Assam. Tourists can either hire a car or get Arunachal Pradesh State Transport(APSTS) bus services via national highway to Roing.

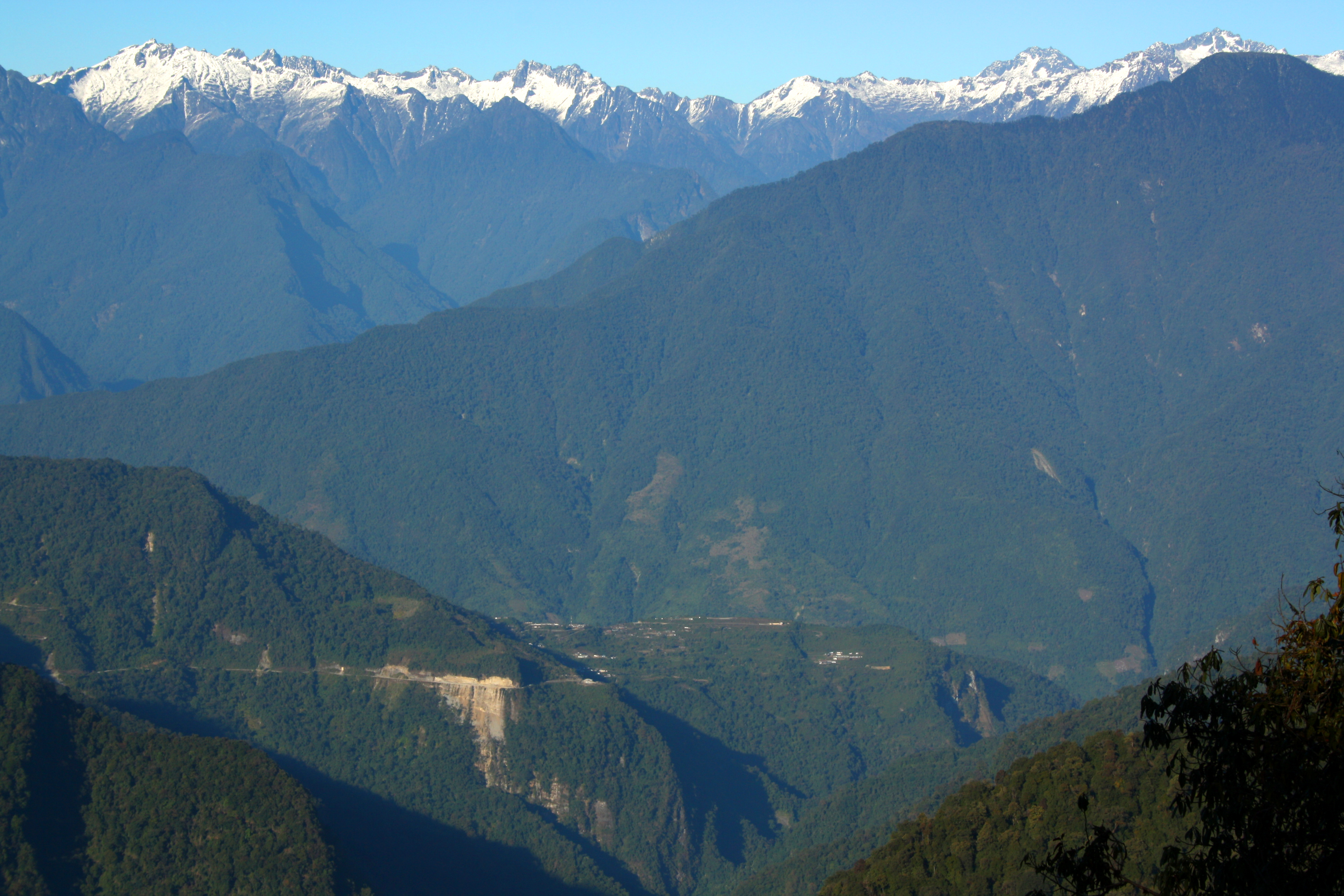
Hunli town seen from Mayodia, with the snow capped Mayu Tops in the background

=== Train ===
The nearest railway station is Tinsukia Junction. From the junction Tourist have to take bus to Roing at a cost of Rs 200 per person. From Roing it is about 3 hours journey to Mayodia and this journey must be completed during day time due to unpredictable road condition.

=== Airway ===
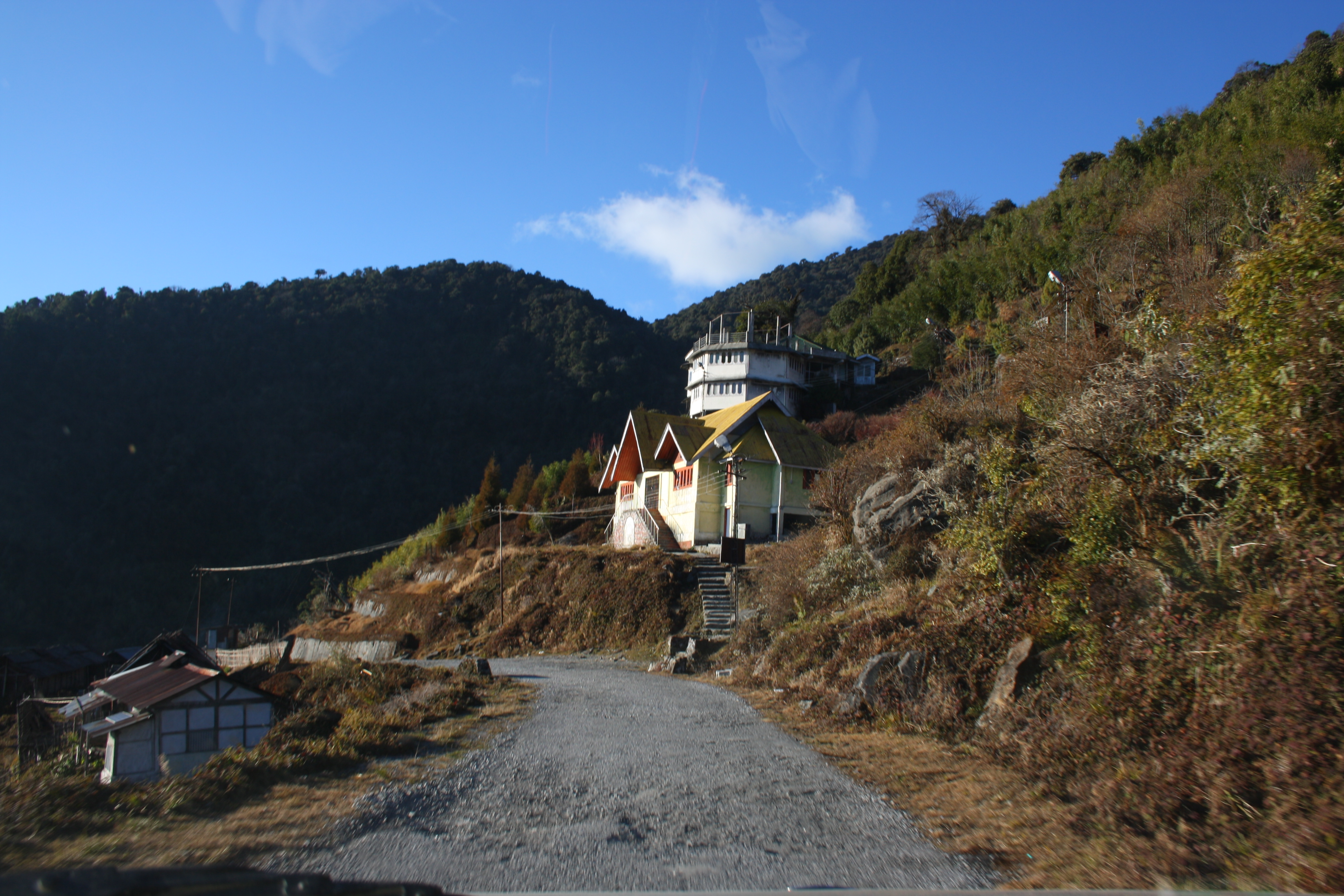
The Tourist Bunglow on the Southern side of Mayodia pass.

The Roing helipad is 53 km away, Pasighat Airport is 148 km, Dibrugarh Airport is 190 km and Tezu airport is 105 km away.

== See also ==
- Geography of Dibang Valley
- List of mountain passes of India
