= Dri Streams =

The Dri Streams, are small streams that flow into the Dibang River in the state of Arunachal Pradesh in India. One of the Dri Streams can be seen from the Aninese Plateau in Anini.
