= Mishmi Hills =

Mountain range in northeastern Arunachal Pradesh, India

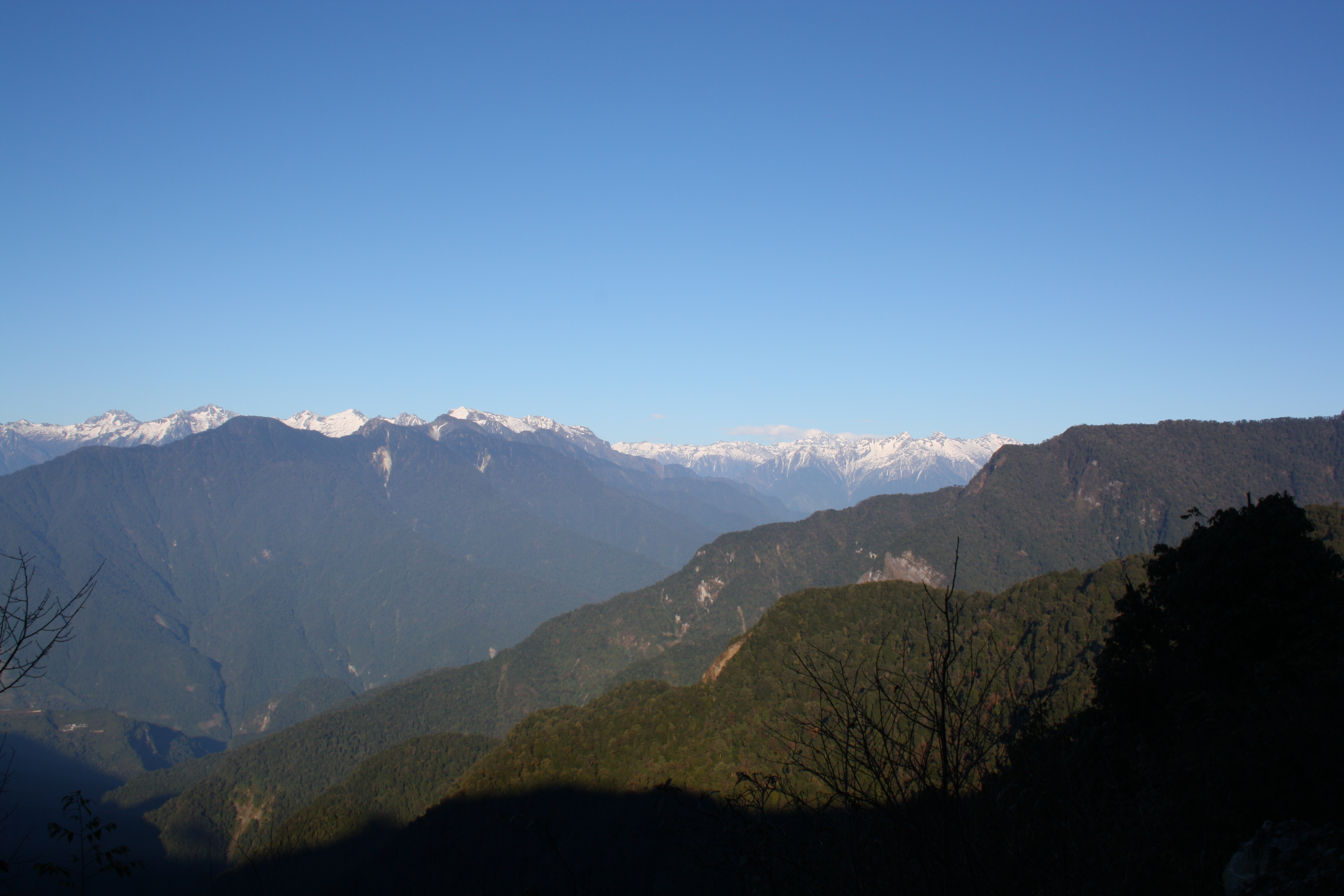
- Snow capped Tops of Mishmi Hills, view from Mayodia Pass, Hunli town at the bottom left

Highest point
- Coordinates: 29°6′N 96°22′E

Geography
- Location within Arunachal Pradesh Location within India Location within Tibet
- Country: India
- State: Arunachal Pradesh

The Mishmi Hills are located at the northeastern tip of India, in northeastern Arunachal Pradesh. On the Chinese side, they form the southern parts of Nyingchi Prefecture in the Tibet Autonomous Region.

These hills occur at the junction of Northeastern Himalaya and Indo-Burma ranges. The Himalayan arc takes a sharp turn and meets Indo-Burma ranges. The rocks of eastern lesser Himalaya and the central crystallines appear to be largely attenuated and truncated in Mishmi Hills.

== Geography ==
Geomorphically, the Mishmi Hills are divided into 2 sections – the flood plains of tributaries of Brahmaputra river and the Arunachal Himalayas consisting of snow-capped mountains, lower Himalayan ranges, and Shivalik ranges. The Hills reach heights above 5,000 m (16,000 ft) but have not been properly mapped. This hilly area is characterised by steeply sloping landform, sub-tropical evergreen forest and high rainfall. The central part of the Hills wrap around both sides of the Dibang Valley. The Mishmi Hills are part of Shan-Malaysia plate. In 1950, the Hills were the epicenter of a devastating earthquake.

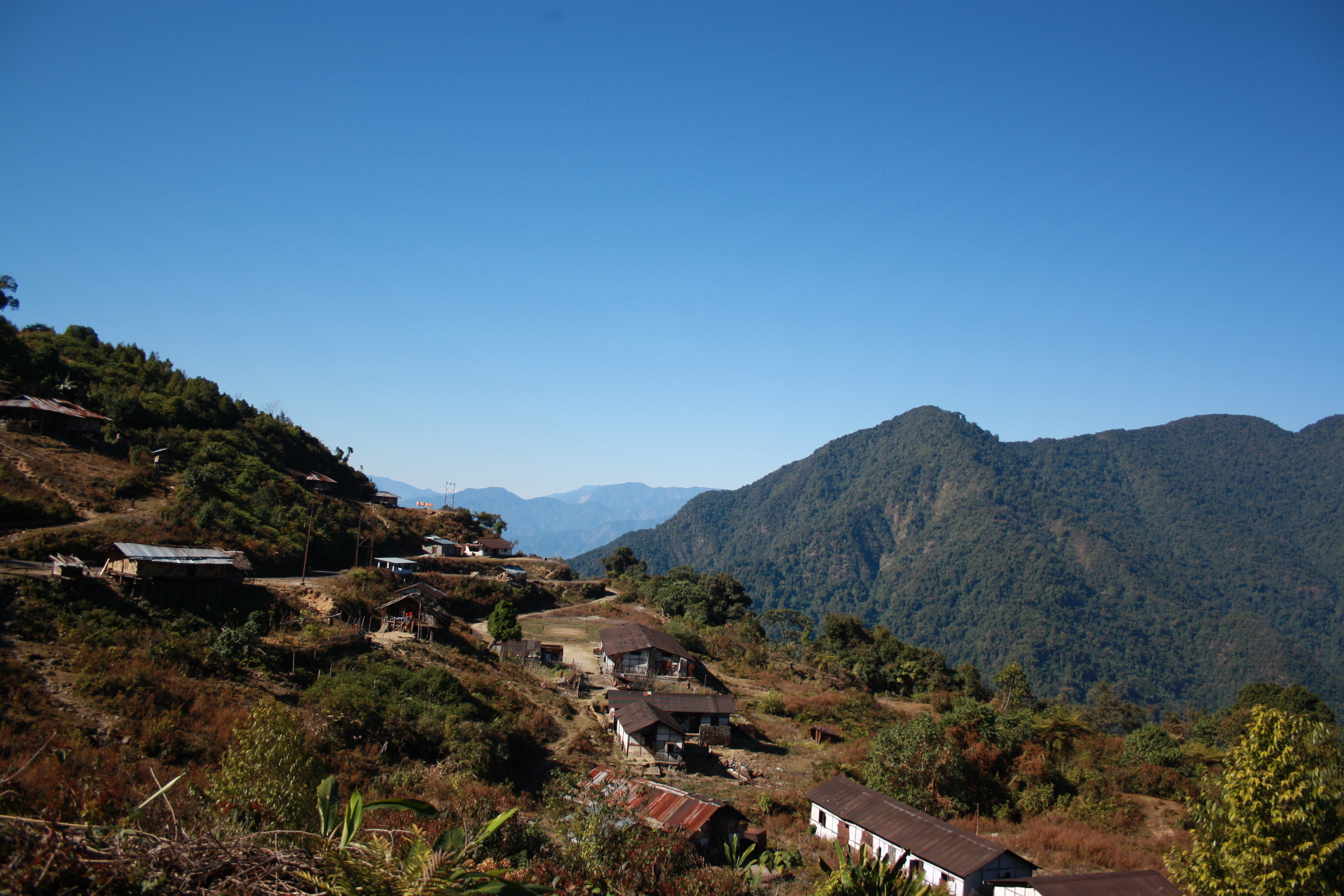
A Small Settlement on the Roing-Mayodia road

== Highest point of the Mishmi Hills ==
1. Lohitang Peak at 5,256.25 metres (17,244.9 ft). Lohitang means The Blood Red coloured Mountain. It is the Last point of Eastern India located at 28°21′N 97°38′E in Arunachal Pradesh
2. Lama Peak at 5,184 metres (17,008 ft). It is the 2nd highest point of the Mishmi Hills located at 29°35′N 96°15′E in Arunachal Pradesh
3. Arunachal Peak at 5,148 metres (16,890 ft). It is the 3rd highest point of the Mishmi Hills & The Easternmost point of India located at 28°02′N 97°44′E in Arunachal Pradesh

== Administration ==
In India, the Mishmi Hills were declared as a district after its bifurcation of Sadiya Frontier Tract in 1948. Again in 1951, the plains area were transferred to the administrative jurisdiction of Assam. In 1952, the headquarters was shifted from Sadiya to Tezu. When the North-East Frontier Agency (NEFA) formed in 1954, Mishmi Hills District became Lohit Frontier Division.

In China, the western parts of the Hills fall under the administration of Mêdog County and the eastern parts are administered by Zayü County. Both these counties are part of Nyingchi Prefecture in the Tibet Autonomous Region.

== Flora and fauna ==
The Mishmi Hills experience heavy rainfall with pre-monsoon showers from March. The humidity and rainfall is about 90%. There are about 6000 plant species, 100 mammal species and about 700 bird species. There are also a large number of butterflies and other insects. Temperate conifers, sub-alpine woody shrubs, alpine meadows, bamboos and grasslands are found in this region. Tiger, common leopard, clouded leopard, snow leopard, golden cat, jungle cat, marbled cat and the leopard cat are found. The endangered red panda is seen in the northern reaches and the hoolock gibbon is in the lower areas. A new subspecies of hoolock gibbon has been described from this area which has been named as Mishmi Hills hoolock H. h. mishmiensis. A new giant flying squirrel named as Mishmi Hills giant flying squirrel has also been described from the region.

One of the most unusual ungulates found here is the Mishmi takin. Himalayan serow, musk deer and the Himalayan black bear are also found.

There are about 680 bird species. Some of them are Sclater's monal, Blyth's and Temminck's tragopan, chestnut-breasted partridge, rufous-necked hornbill, pale-capped pigeon, Ward's trogon, dark-sided thrush, green and purple cochoa, rusty-bellied and Gould's shortwing, beautiful nuthatch, Mishmi and wedge-billed babbler, fire-tailed myzornis, at least four parrotbill species, black-headed greenfinch, scarlet finch and grey-headed bullfinch.

The major part of Dihang-Dibang Biosphere Reserve and the whole of Dibang Wildlife Sanctuary falls within the area of Mishmi Hills

== Climate ==
Temperatures ranges from below 5 °C in winter to 38 °C in summer.

== Maps ==
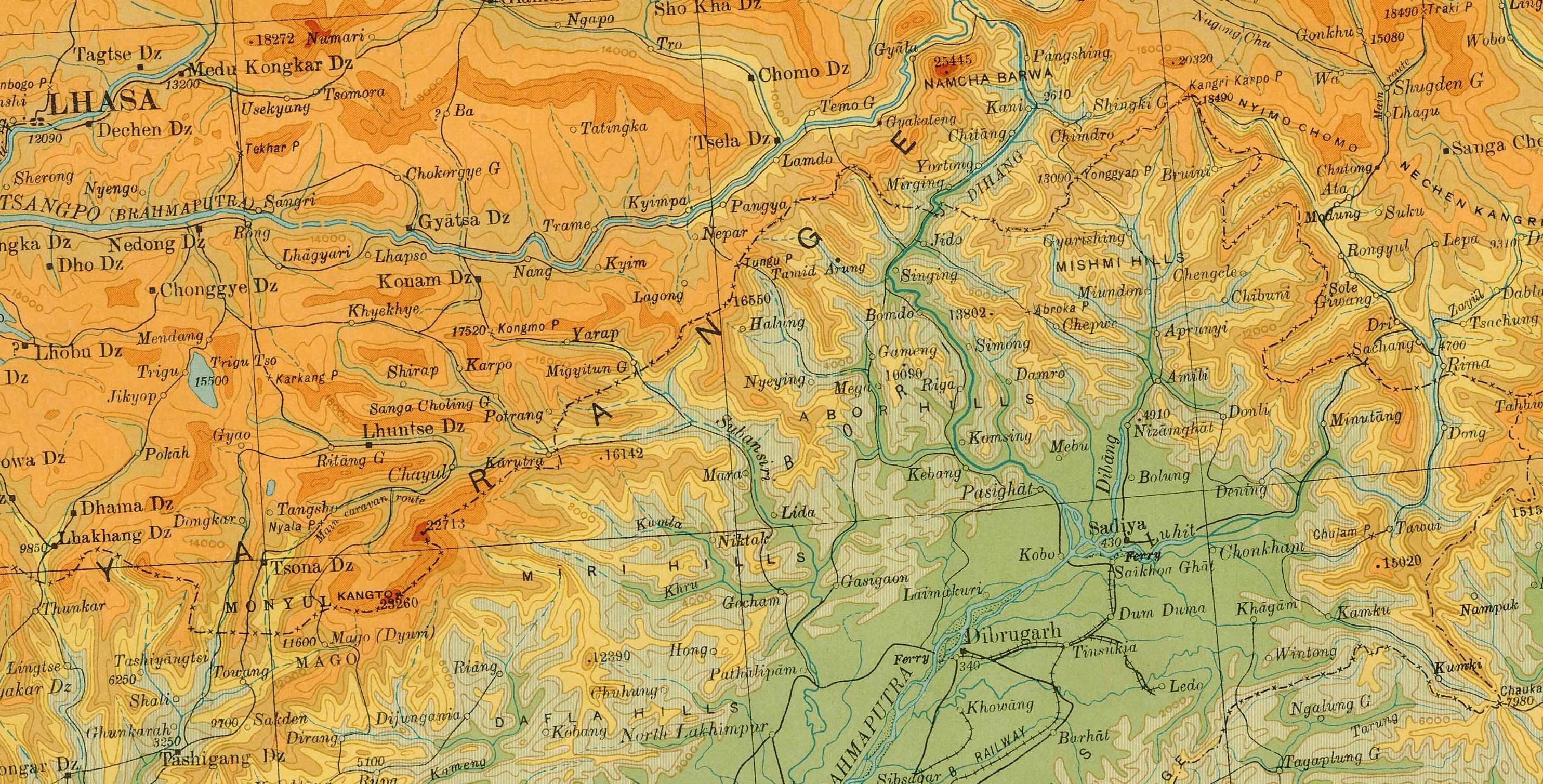
1936

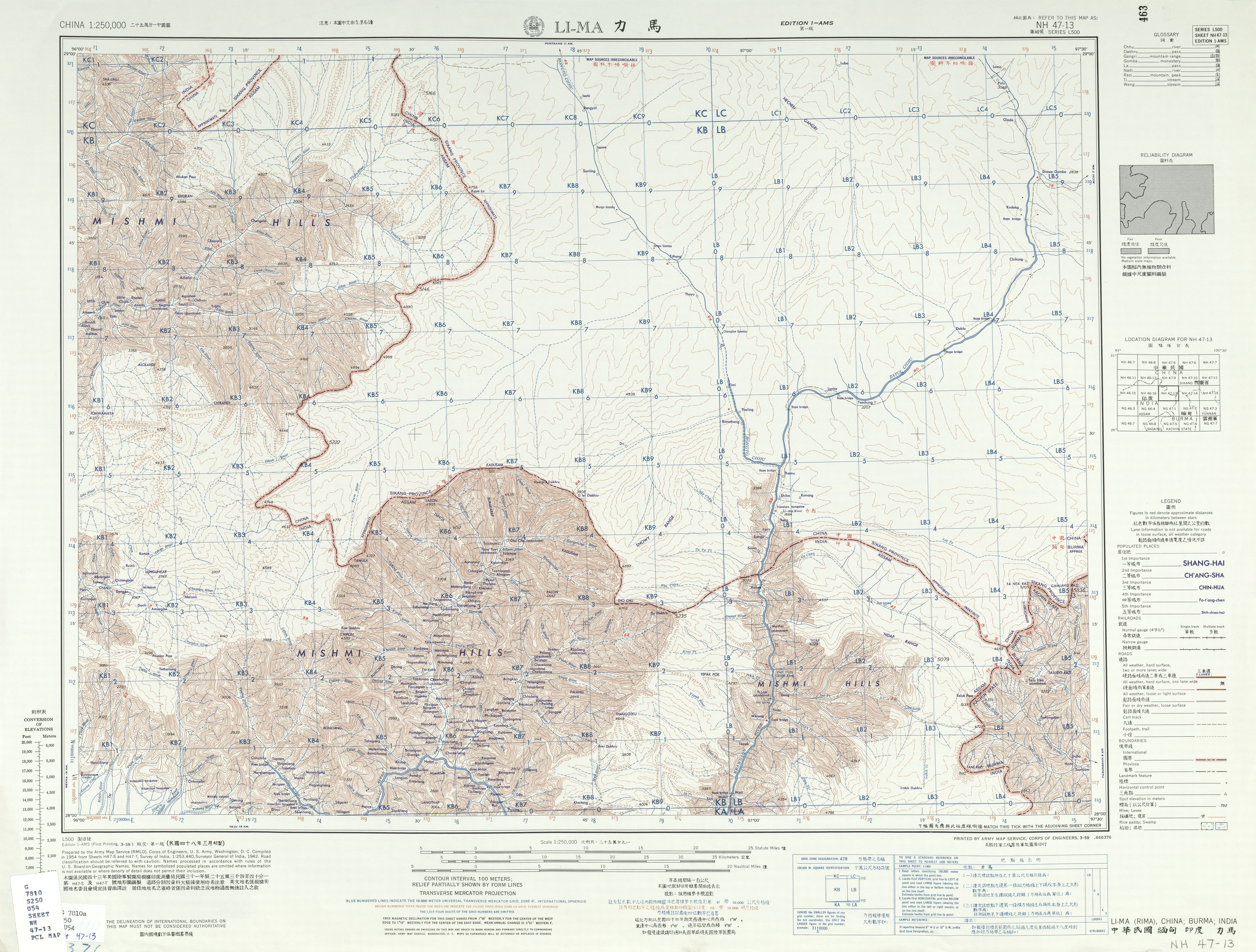
1954

1891

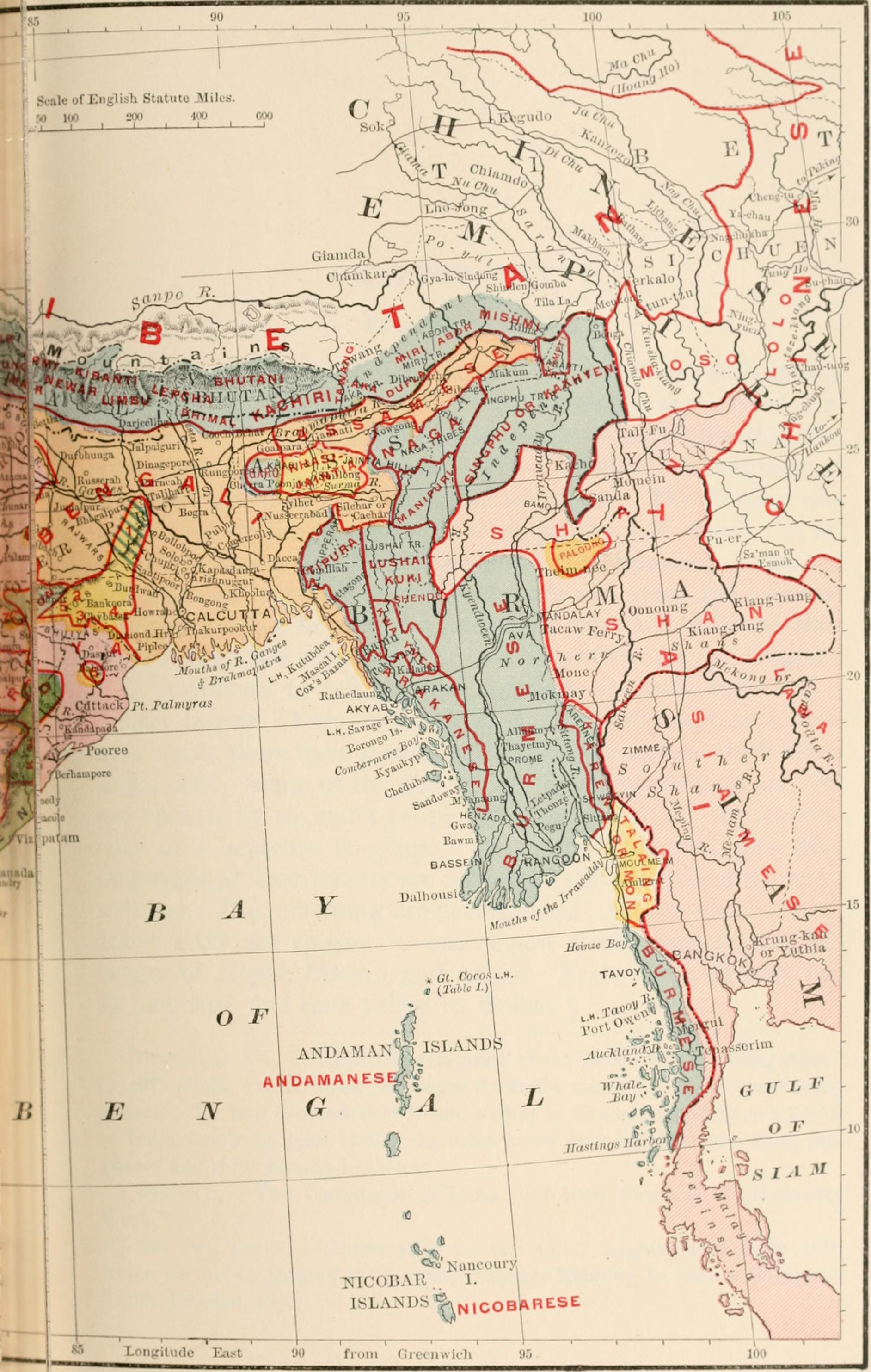
1891

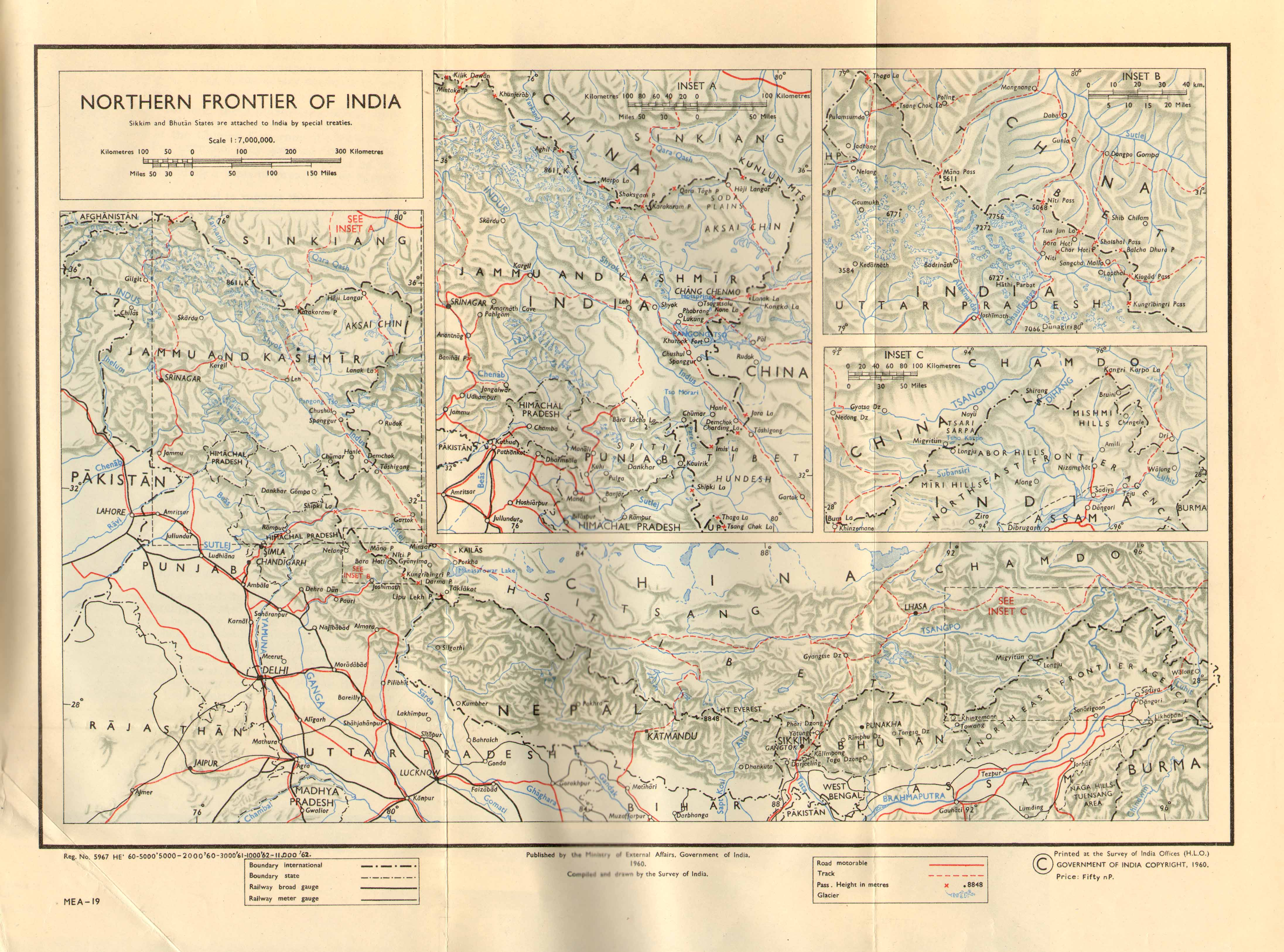
1960
