= Dibang Dam =

Dibang Multipurpose Project
- Location within Arunachal Pradesh Location within India
- Country: India
- Coordinates: 28°20′15″N 95°46′15″E
- Status: Under construction
- Opening date: 2032 (est.)
- Owner: NHPC Limited

Dam and spillways
- Type of dam: Concrete gravity
- Impounds: Dibang River
- Height: 278 m (912 ft)

Power Station
- Turbines: 12 x 240 MW Francis-type
- Installed capacity: 2880 MW

The Dibang Dam is an under-construction concrete gravity dam, located in the Lower Dibang Valley District in Arunachal Pradesh, India. Upon completion it will be India's largest dam and the world's tallest concrete gravity dam, standing 278 metres (912 ft) tall. The Dibang Dam is expected to provide up to 3,000 megawatts of hydroelectric power and will also assist with flood control in the Dibang Valley.

== History ==
The foundation stone for the dam was laid on 31 January 2008 by Prime Minister Manmohan Singh. Construction on the project, however, has yet to begin. In 2013, the Ministry of Environment and Forests rejected the project's application but NHPC Limited resubmitted it in 2014. The dam has also been under intense local and international opposition to its tentative negative environmental impacts and forced relocations of Idu Mishmi tribal peoples.

The Modi government gave a renewed go-ahead for the project in 2019. The main purpose of the project will be flood control and electricity generation.
