= Lower Dibang Valley district =

Coordinates: 28.144545°N 95.841722°E

- District of Arunachal Pradesh
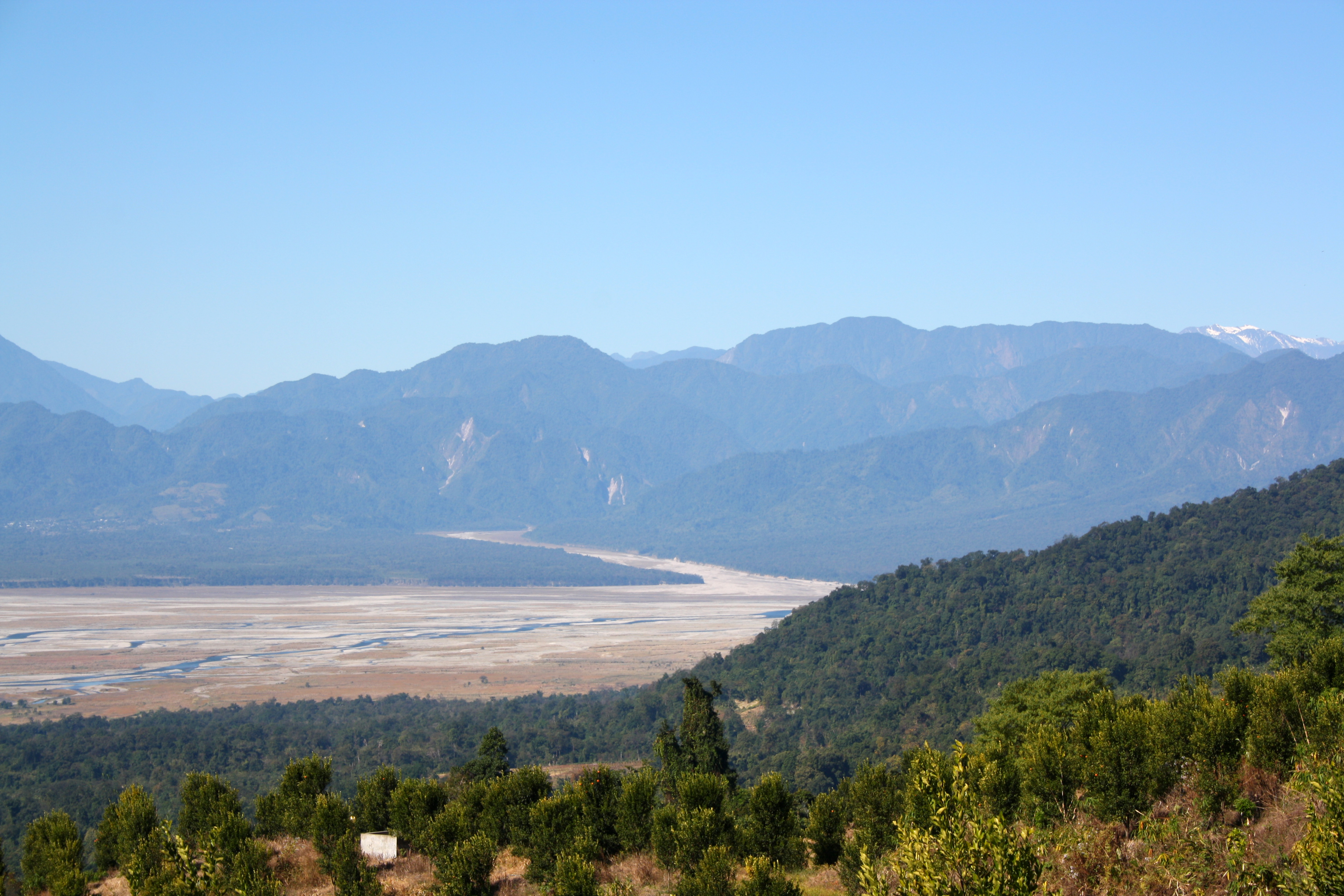
- View of the Dibang River from Bara Golai north of Roing
- Interactive map of Lower Dibang Valley district
- Country: India
- State: Arunachal Pradesh
- Headquarters: Roing

Area
  - Total: 3,900 km^{2} (1,500 sq mi)

Population (2011)
  - Total: 54,080
  - Density: 14/km^{2} (36/sq mi)

Demographics
  - Literacy: 70.4%
  - Sex ratio: 919
- Time zone: UTC+05:30 (IST)
- Website: roing.nic.in

Lower Dibang Valley district (/dɪˈbæŋ/ dib-ANG) is an administrative district in the state of Arunachal Pradesh in northeastern India. It is the tenth least populous district in the country, and the least densely populated district.

== History ==
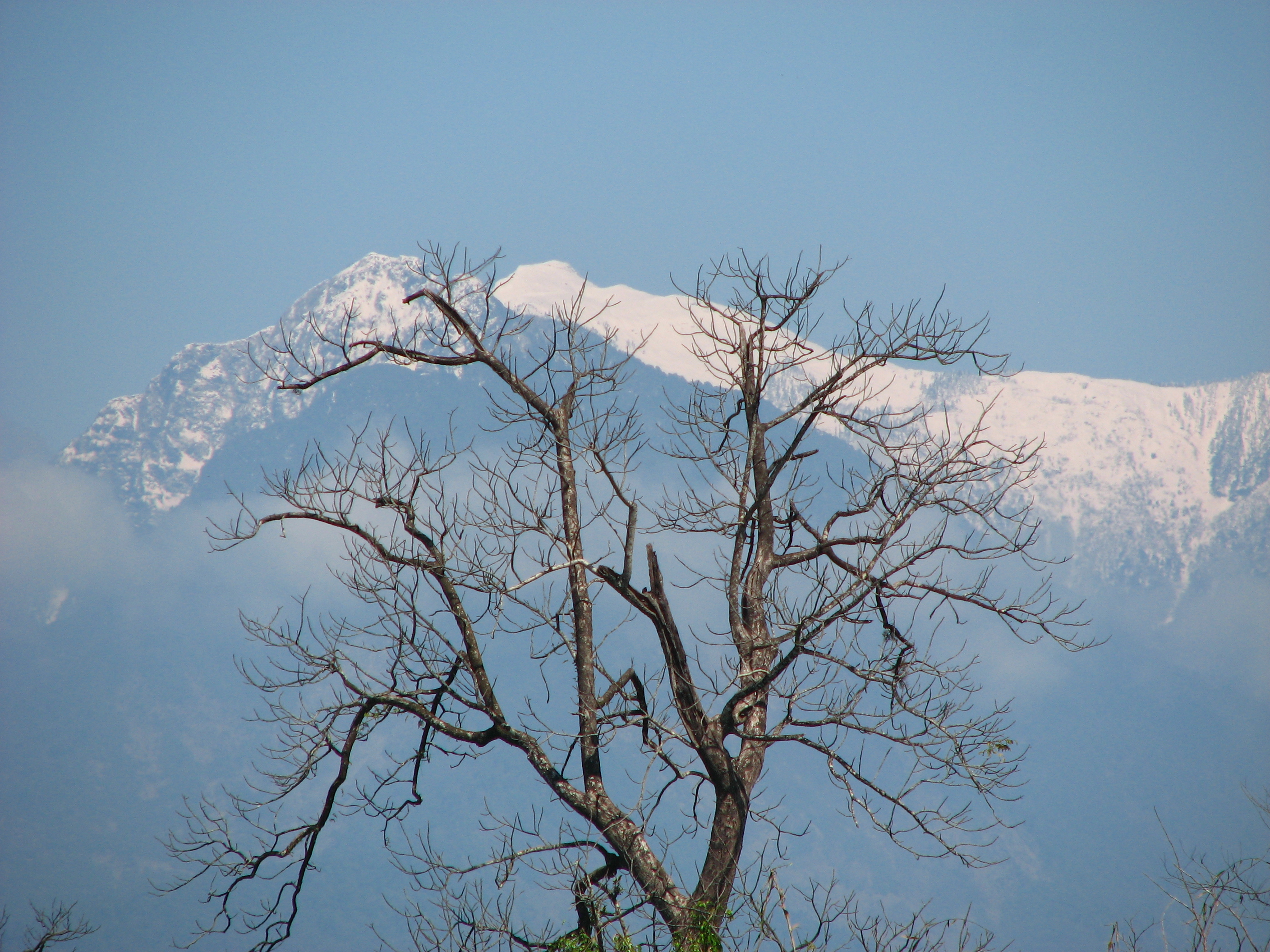
Snow capped mountain

The plains, foothills, and lower hills of the district were part of the Chutia kingdom, while the higher hills were inhabited by the Mishmis. Chidu-Chimri Fort, a hill fort/settlement, and Barnagar, the capital of the Chutia period, are some of the important historical sites of the district. After the Ahom defeat of the Chutias, the Mishmis were permitted to settle in the plains, and a border was drawn near the present-day Arunachal Pradesh-Assam state borders. The Sadiya Serpent Pillar, which was originally constructed by the Chutias at the gate of their capital city on the banks of the Dikrong River, marked this border. The 1978 Lohit District Gazetteer states that the disappearance of the Chutias from their former homeland "seems to have coincided with the advent of the early Mishmi migrants in the Sadiya region". The Ahom kingdom subsequently administered the Sadiya frontier through the Sadiya Khowa Gohain and maintained relations with the Mishmis and other neighbouring hill communities.

In June 1980, the Dibang Valley district was created from part of the Lohit district. On 16 December 2001, the Dibang Valley district was bifurcated into Dibang Valley district and Lower Dibang Valley district.

== Geography and timeline ==
The headquarters of the district is the town of Roing. Before it was carved out of the district on 16 December 2001, Anini housed the district headquarters.

== Transport ==
The proposed 2,000-kilometre-long (1,200 mi) Arunachal Pradesh Frontier Highway goes along the McMahon Line, and will pass through the Lower Dibang Valley district. An alignment map can be seen here and here. It will intersect with the proposed East-West Industrial Corridor Highway.

== Divisions ==
There are two Arunachal Pradesh Legislative Assembly constituencies located in this district: Dambuk and Roing. Both are part of the Arunachal East Lok Sabha constituency.

== Demographics ==
According to the 2011 census, the Lower Dibang Valley district has a population of 54,080, roughly equal to the island nation of Saint Kitts and Nevis. This makes it the 630th least populous district in India (out of a total of 640). The district has a population density of 14 inhabitants per square kilometre (36/sq mi), lowest in the country. Its rate of population growth rate from 2001–2011 was 7.01%. The Lower Dibang Valley has a sex ratio of 919 females for every 1000 males, and a literacy rate of 70.38%. Scheduled Tribes make up 48.03% of the population.

=== Religion ===
Religion in Lower Dibang Valley district (2011)
Religion	Per cent
Hinduism	53.47%
Tribal religion	19.22%
Christianity	17.04%
Buddhism	5.42%
Islam	4.15%
Other or not stated	0.70%

=== Languages ===
Major languages spoken include Idu Mishmi and Adi. Hindi has been taught in schools since the 1970s. Most of the citizens understand and speak Hindi. In other various areas, different languages are spoken, such as Nepali and Assamese. English is also spoken by educated citizens.

At the time of the 2011 census, 24.29% of the population spoke Nepali, 23.03% Adi, 15.15% Mishmi, 7.04% Bengali, 7.02% Mishing, 4.54% Bhojpuri, 3.75% Assamese, 2.83% Hindi and 2.23% Galo as their first language.

== Flora and fauna ==
The district is rich in wildlife. Rare mammals such as Mishmi takin, red goral, Indian elephants, Bengal tigers, wild water buffalos and leaf muntjac live in the district. Birds that live in the Lower Dibang Valley include Sclater's monal, Blyth's tragopan, the rufous-necked hornbill, the Bengal florican, and the white-winged wood duck. Mishmi Hills giant flying squirrels (Petaurista mishmiensis) also live in this district.

In 1980, the Lower Dibang Valley district became home to the Mehao Wildlife Sanctuary, which has an area of 282 km^{2} (108.9 mi^{2}). A new subspecies of hoolock gibbon has been discovered in this area, which was named the Mishmi Hills hoolock. H. h. mishmiensis.
