= Dibang River =

River in Arunachal Pradesh, India

Dibang river Talo
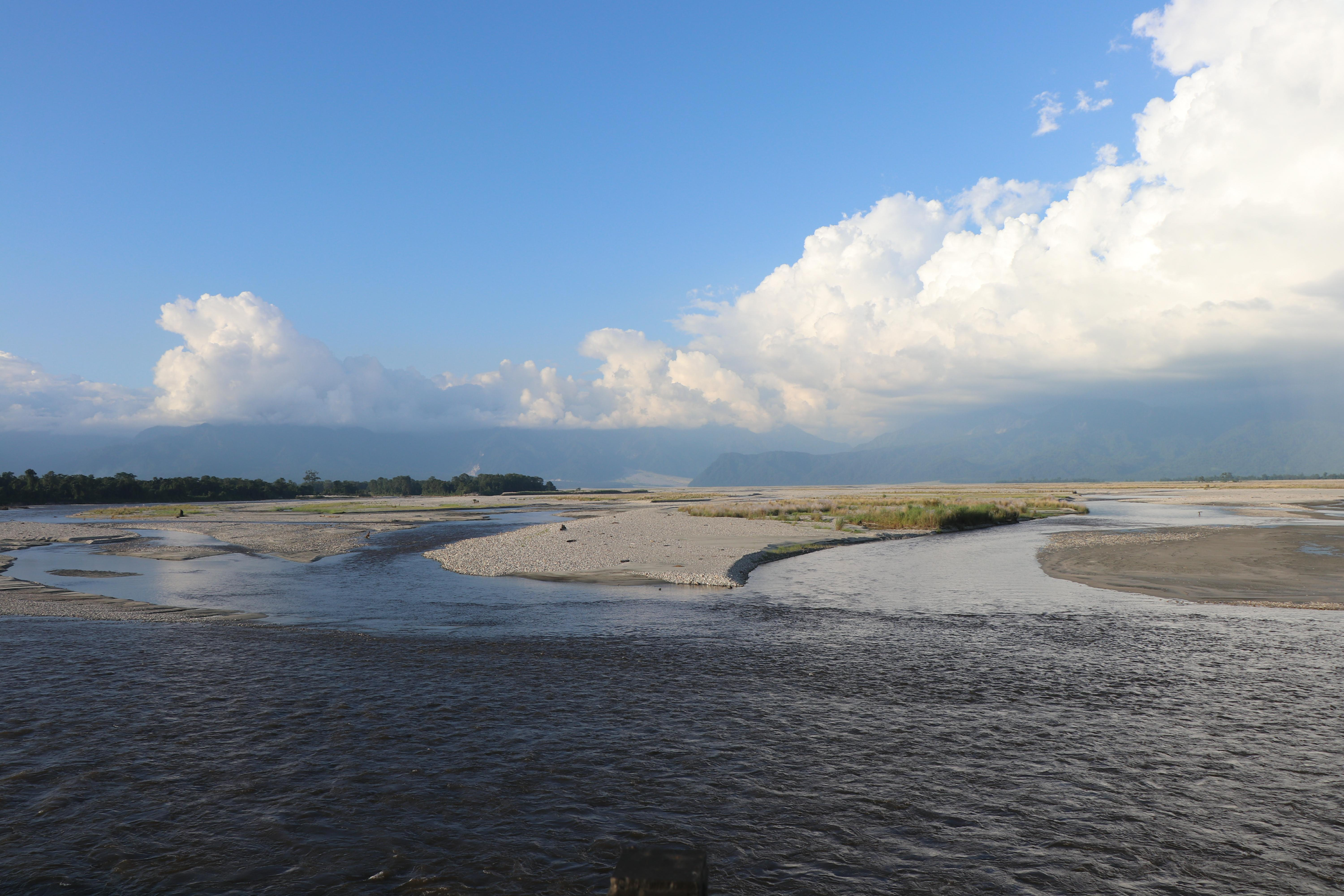

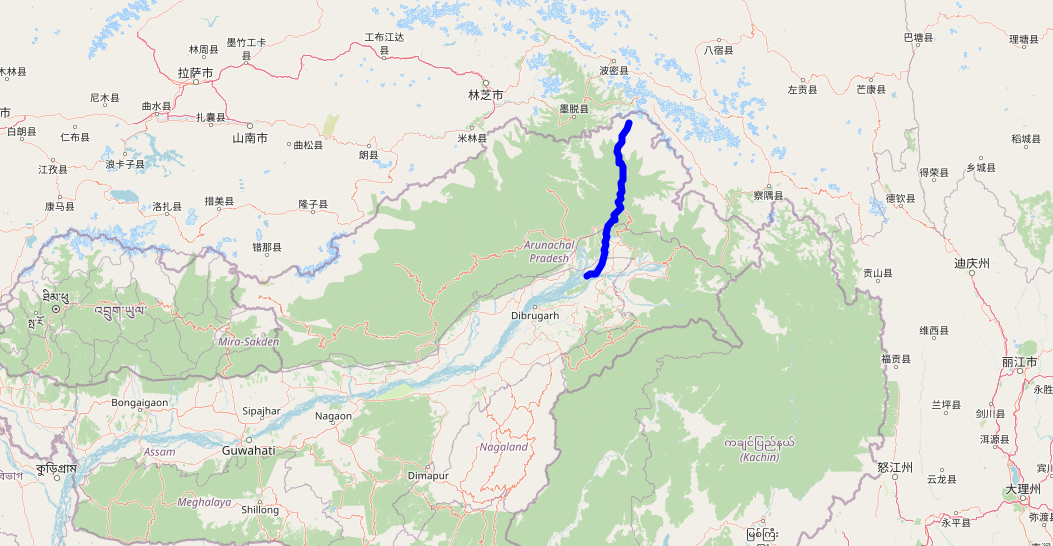

- Location within Arunachal Pradesh Location within India
- Native name: Talon (Idu-Mishmi)

Physical characteristics
- Source: Dri
  - coordinates: 28.7807°N 95.8603°E
- 2nd source: Tangon
- Mouth: Lohit River
  - location: Sadiya, Assam
  - coordinates: 27.8012°N 95.5173°E
- Length: 324 km (201 mi)
- Basin size: 13,933 km^{2} (5,380 sq mi)
- Discharge
  - location: Kobo Chapori (into the Brahmaputra)

Basin features
- River system: Brahmaputra River
- Tributaries
  - left: Emra, Anelih
  - right: Tangon, Angolin, Amli

Dibang River, also known as Talo in Idu, is an upstream tributary river of the Brahmaputra in the Indian state of Arunachal Pradesh. It originates and flows through the Mishmi Hills in the (Upper) Dibang Valley and Lower Dibang Valley districts.

== Course ==
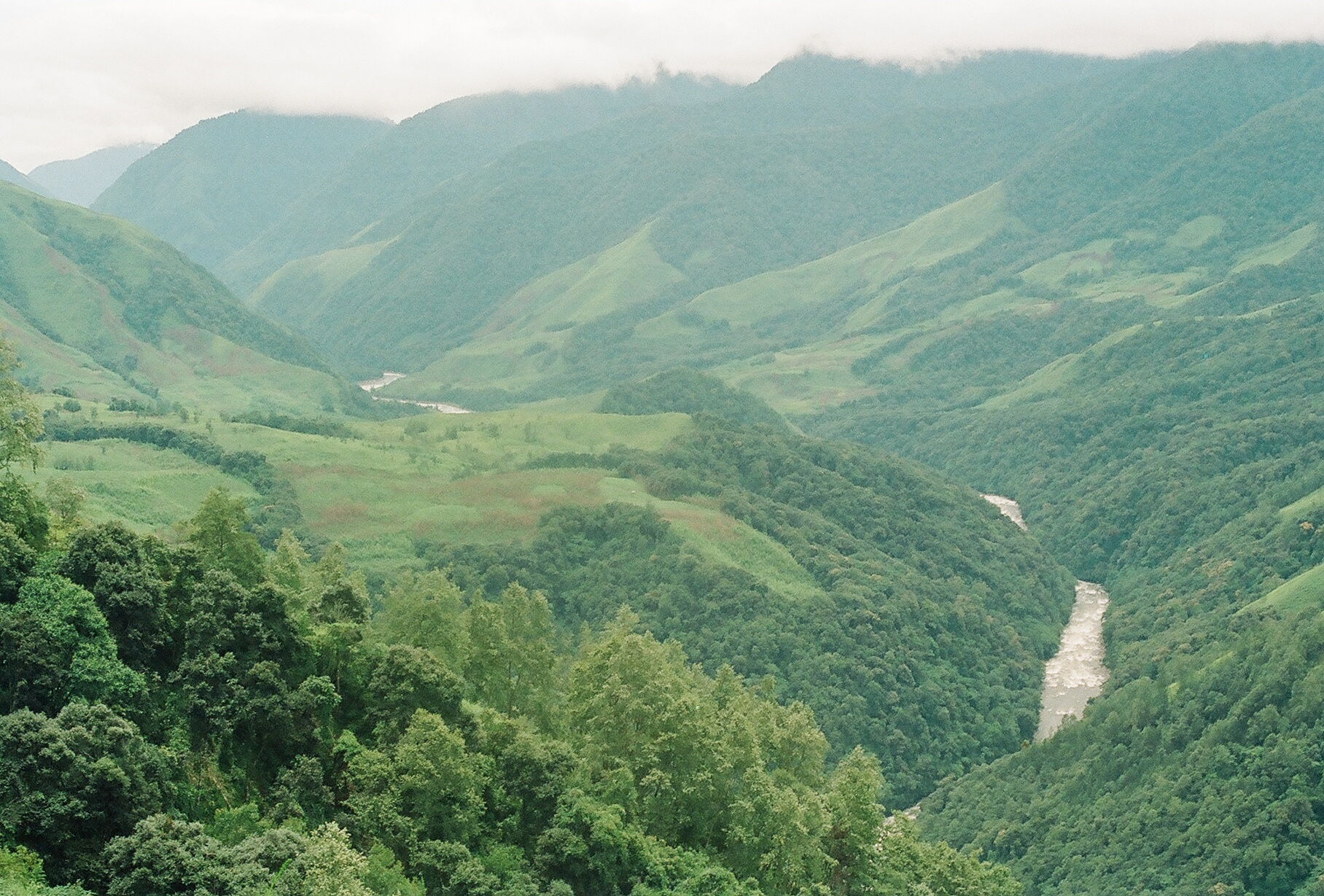
Dibang river valley

The Dibang originates near Keya pass on the Indo-Chinese border in the Upper Dibang Valley district of Arunachal Pradesh. The drainage basin of the river within Arunachal Pradesh covers the districts of Upper Dibang Valley and Lower Dibang Valley. The Mishmi Hills lie in the upper course of the Dibang which enters the plains at Bomjir, Dambuk etc.

Between Bomjir (Nizamghat) and Sadiya the Dibang has a steep river gradient and exhibits braided channel morphology, with its width varying from 4 to 9 kilometres (2 to 6 mi). It often changes its course, resulting in flooding and destruction of cultivable land and forests along its banks. The Dibang, with a total length of 195 kilometres (121 mi), enters the River Lohit north of the Dibru-Saikhowa National Park near the Assamese town of Sadiya.

== Tributaries ==
The Sisar, Mathun, Tangon, Dri, Ithun and Emra are the major tributaries of the Dibang. The Dibang is also joined by a number of tributaries such as the Airi, Ilu, Imu, Ahi, Ashu, Epipani and Eze (Deopani) rivers during its course. Most of these rivers join it in the upper course in the hills thus giving it a wide fan-shaped catchment region.

== Hydro projects ==
As of 2016 there were 18 hydro-electric projects at different stages of proposal and planning in the Dibang basin.

In 2008, Prime Minister Manmohan Singh laid the foundation stone for a 3000 MW dam as part of the Dibang Multipurpose Project in the district of Lower Dibang Valley. Seventeen other dams with power potential between 20 and 4500 MW have also been proposed for the Dibang. The proposed Dibang dam, at 288 metres (945 ft), on completion would be among the largest dams in India and among the world's tallest gravity dams has since run into opposition from the Adi, Idu and the Assamese who live downstream of the project.

On 18 July 2019, the Prime Minister chaired Cabinet Committee on Economic Affairs gave the greenlight to continue with the Dibang hydropower project. The renewal has been backed by the electricity the project has the capacity to generate, help with flood control in the region and as a control measure against Chinese hydro projects.

== See also ==
- Dibang River Bridge
- Dibang Dam
