= Dibang Valley district =

District of Arunachal Pradesh, India

- District of Arunachal Pradesh, India
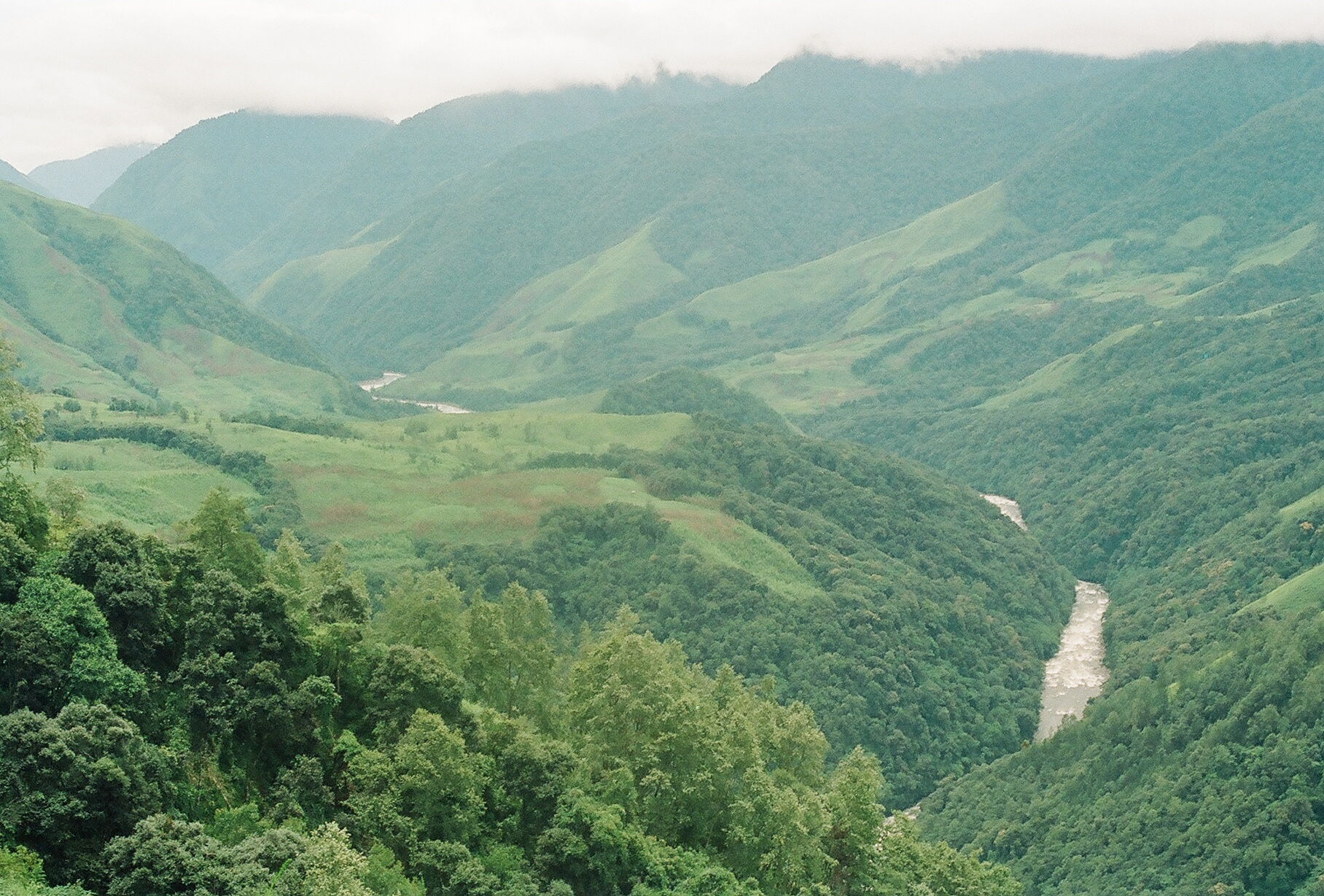

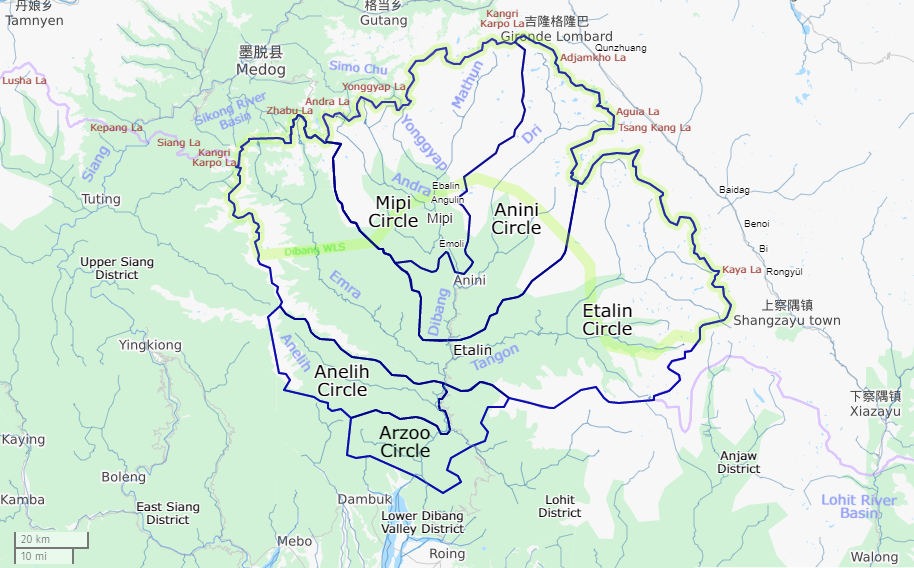
- Dibang Valley district with administrative circles and other labels
- Interactive map of Dibang Valley district
- Coordinates (Anini): 28°42′N 95°42′E
- Country: India
- Indian state: Arunachal Pradesh
- Headquarters: Anini

Government
  - Deputy Commissioner: Minga Sherpa, Indian Administrative Service

Area
  - Total: 9,129 km^{2} (3,525 sq mi)

Population (2011)
  - Total: 8,004
  - Density: 0.8768/km^{2} (2.271/sq mi)
  - Urban: 27.55%

Demographics
  - Literacy in India: 64.8%
  - Sex ratio: 808
- Time zone: UTC+05:30 (Indian Standard Time)
- Website: dibangvalley.nic.in

Dibang Valley district (/dɪˈbæŋ/ dib-ANG) is a district in Arunachal Pradesh named after the Dibang River. It has an area of 9,129 km^{2} (3,525 sq mi) and is the least populated district in both the state and the country. The district is called "Talon" by the Mishmi people.

== History ==
In June 1980, Dibang Valley district was created out of part of Lohit district. On 16 December 2001, Dibang Valley district was bifurcated into Dibang Valley district and Lower Dibang Valley district.

== Geography ==
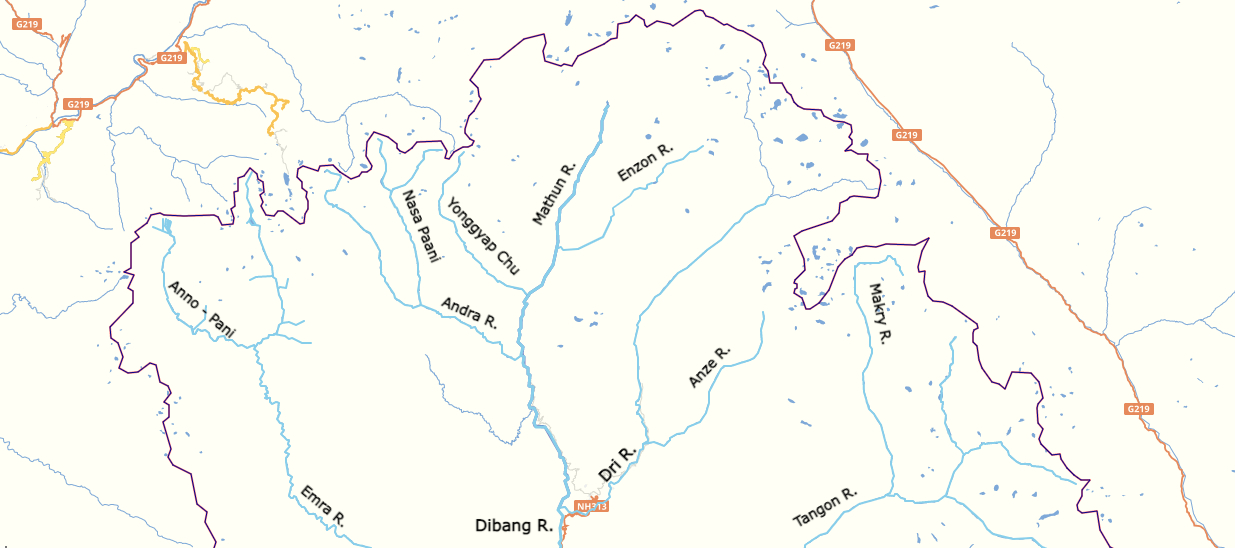
Rivers in Dibang Valley district

The Dibang River originates in the mountains of Arunachal Pradesh and flows through the length of the valley which is named after it. The Dibang has multiple tributaries and only once it debouches into the plains is it called by its name. Some of the major rivers of Dibang Valley District are the Ahui, Emra, Mathun, Dri, Tangon, Ithun, and Ange. The capital of this district, Anini, is the northernmost district capital in Northeast India. This district contains the northernmost point of Northeast India.

== Transport ==
The 2,000-kilometre-long (1,200 mi) proposed Mago-Thingbu to Vijaynagar Arunachal Pradesh Frontier Highway along the McMahon Line, (will intersect with the proposed East-West Industrial Corridor Highway) will pass through this district, alignment map of which can be seen here and here.

== Divisions ==
There is only one Arunachal Pradesh Legislative Assembly constituency in this district- the Anini constituency. It is part of Arunachal East Lok Sabha constituency.

== Demographics ==
Historical population
Year	Pop.	±% p.a.
1961	3,221	—
1971	5,297	+5.10%
1981	6,912	+2.70%
1991	7,393	+0.68%
2001	7,272	−0.16%
2011	8,004	+0.96%

According to the 2011 census, Dibang Valley district has a population of 7,948, roughly equal to the nation of Nauru. This gives it a ranking of 640th in India (out of a total of 640). The district has a population density of 0.8 inhabitants per square kilometre (2.1/sq mi). With this, it is also the most sparsely populated district in India. Its population growth rate over the decade 2001–2011 was 9.3%. Dibang Valley has a sex ratio of 808 females for every 1000 males, and a literacy rate of 64.8%.

The major population of this district consists of Mishmi (Idu).

The Mishmis have a story narrating the first journeys undertaken in course of migration. The story conveys the names and location of the Cheethu-Huluni or the twelve rivers that the Mishmi (Idu) people came over in the region and settled around. The first accounts of the Mishmi (Idus) are found in the narrations given by the neighboring Ahoms. The Mishmis inhabited the deep jungles of what is now the Dibang valley.

=== Religion ===
Religion in Dibang Valley district (2011)
Religion	Per cent
Donyi Polo	55.01%
Hinduism	39.24%
Christianity	2.79%
Buddhism	1.57%
Islam	1.39%

About 40% of the district's population follows Hinduism. The Mishmi(Idu) people here believes that Rukmini-Chief Consort of Lord Krishna belonged to their tribe. The plays and dances on 'Rukmini haran' are common. There is a legend that Lord Krishna asked the Mishmi people to cut their hair as a form of punishment for not allowing him to marry Rukmini. Due to this Idu-Mishmi people are also called "chulikata" (chuli-hair, kata- cut).

=== Languages ===
Languages of Dibang Valley District (2011)
1. Mishmi (68.7%)
2. Nepali (14.2%)
3. Hindi (5.10%)
4. Assamese (2.70%)
5. Bengali (2.17%)
6. Adi (1.01%)
7. Others (6.10%)

Languages spoken include Idu Mishmi with approximately 25,000 speakers, written in both Latin and Devanagric scripts.

== Flora and fauna ==
The district is rich in wildlife. Rare mammals such as Mishmi takin, red goral and Gongshan muntjac occur, while among birds there is the rare Sclater's monal. A flying squirrel new to science was discovered from this district in the 2000s. It has been named as Mishmi giant flying squirrel, Petaurista mishmiensis.

In 1991, Dibang Valley district became home to the Dibang Wildlife Sanctuary, which has an area of 4,149 km^{2} (1,601.9 mi^{2}).

== Map ==
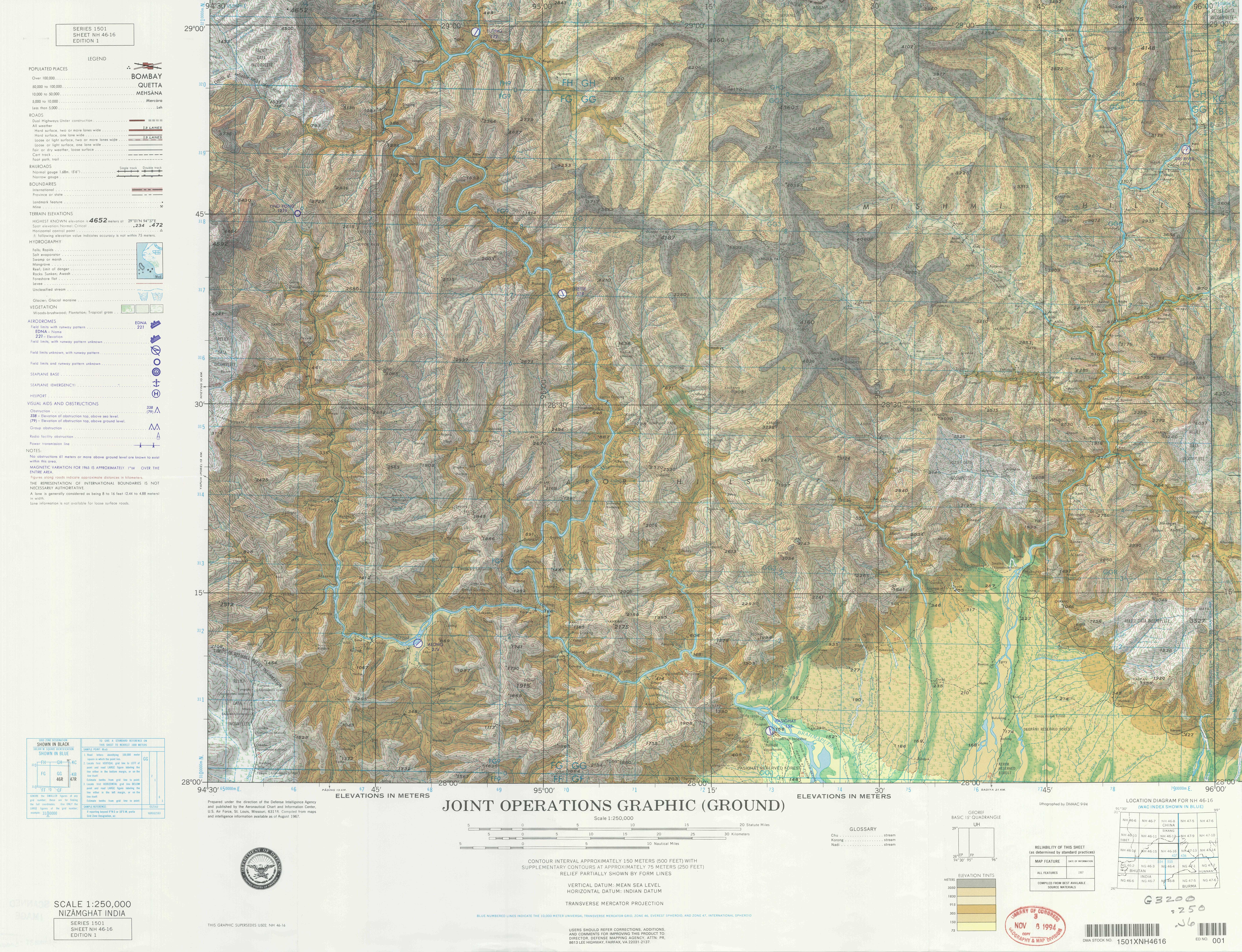
