= Outline of Arunachal Pradesh =

State in NE India

Location of Arunachal Pradesh

The following outline is provided as an overview of and topical guide to Arunachal Pradesh:

Arunachal Pradesh (/ərʊˌnɑːtʃəl prəˈdeɪʃ/; lit. 'Dawn-Lit Mountain Province') is a state in northeast India. It was formed from the North-East Frontier Agency (NEFA) region, and India declared it as a state on 20 February 1987. Itanagar is its capital and largest town. It borders the Indian states of Assam and Nagaland to the south. It shares international borders with Bhutan in the west, Myanmar in the east, and a disputed 1,129 km border with China's Tibet Autonomous Region in the north at the McMahon Line. Arunachal Pradesh is claimed in its entirety by China as South Tibet as part of the Tibet Autonomous Region; China occupied some regions of Arunachal Pradesh in 1962 but later withdrew its forces.

== General reference ==
=== Names ===
- Common name: Arunachal Pradesh
  - Pronunciation: /ˌɑːrəˌnɑːtʃəl prəˈdɛʃ/
- Previously known as:
  - North-East Frontier Agency
  - Union Territory of Arunachal Pradesh (20 January 1972 to 20 February 1987.)
- Official name: Arunachal Pradesh
- Adjectival(s): Arunachali
- Demonym(s): Arunachalis
- Abbreviations and name codes
  - ISO 3166-2 code: IN-AR

=== Rankings (amongst India's states and union territories) ===
- by population: 31st
- by area (2011 census): 15th
- by crime rate (2016): 17th
- by gross domestic product (GDP) (2014): 27th
- by Human Development Index (HDI)(2017): 24th
- by life expectancy at birth:
- by literacy rate (2011 census): 34th

== Geography of Arunachal Pradesh ==
Geography of Arunachal Pradesh

- Arunachal Pradesh is: an Indian state, one of the Seven Sister States
- Population of Arunachal Pradesh: 1,382,611
- Area of Arunachal Pradesh: 83,743 km2 (32,333 sq mi)
- Atlas of Arunachal Pradesh

=== Location of Arunachal Pradesh ===
- Arunachal Pradesh is situated within the following regions:
  - Northern Hemisphere
  - Eastern Hemisphere
    - Eurasia
      - Asia
        - South Asia
          - India
            - Northeast India
- Time zone(s): Indian Standard Time (IST) (UTC+05:30)

=== Environment of Arunachal Pradesh ===
- Climate of Arunachal Pradesh
- Topography of Arunachal Pradesh
- Biome types in Arunachal Pradesh
  - Tropical and Sub-tropical forests
  - Temperate forest
  - Pine forests
  - Subalpine forest
- Wildlife of Arunachal Pradesh
  - Flora of Arunachal Pradesh

==== Natural geographic features of Arunachal Pradesh ====
- Hills in Arunachal Pradesh
  - Patkai
- Mountains in Arunachal Pradesh
  - Himalayas
- Rivers in Arunachal Pradesh
  - Dibang River
  - Kameng River
  - Lohit River
  - Tirap River
  - Subansiri River

==== Protected areas of Arunachal Pradesh ====
- Dibang Wildlife Sanctuary
- Dihang-Dibang Biosphere Reserve
- Eaglenest Wildlife Sanctuary
- Kameng Elephant Reserve
- Kamlang Wildlife Sanctuary
- Mehao Wildlife Sanctuary
- Mouling National Park
- Namdapha National Park
- Sessa Orchid Sanctuary
- Talley Valley Wildlife Sanctuary

=== Regions of Arunachal Pradesh ===
==== Ecoregions of Arunachal Pradesh ====
- Brahmaputra Valley semi-evergreen forests
- Eastern Himalayan broadleaf forests
- Eastern Himalaya subalpine conifer forests
- Northeastern Himalayan subalpine conifer forests
- Eastern Himalayan alpine shrub and meadows

==== Administrative divisions of Arunachal Pradesh ====
===== Districts of Arunachal Pradesh =====
- Districts of Arunachal Pradesh
  1. Tawang district
  2. West Kameng district
  3. East Kameng district
  4. Pakke-Kessang district
  5. Papum Pare district
  6. Kurung Kumey district
  7. Kra Daadi district
  8. Lower Subansiri district
  9. Upper Subansiri district
  10. West Siang district
  11. Siang district
  12. Upper Siang district
  13. Lower Siang district
  14. Lepa-Rada district
  15. Shi-Yomi district
  16. East Siang district
  17. Lower Dibang Valley district
  18. Upper Dibang Valley district
  19. Lohit district
  20. Anjaw district
  21. Namsai district
  22. Changlang district
  23. Tirap district
  24. Longding district
  25. Kamle district

===== Municipalities of Arunachal Pradesh =====
Cities and towns in Arunachal Pradesh

- Capital of Arunachal Pradesh: Itanagar
- Along
- Bomdila
- Daporijo
- Naharlagun
- Pasighat
- Seppa
- Tawang
- Tezu
- Ziro

== Demographics of Arunachal Pradesh ==
Population Growth
Year	Pop.	±%
1961	337,000	—
1971	468,000	+38.9%
1981	632,000	+35.0%
1991	865,000	+36.9%
2001	1,098,000	+26.9%
2011	1,382,611	+25.9%
Source:Census of India; First ever census was carried out in 1961.

Languages of Arunachal Pradesh in 2001
1. Nyishi (18.9%)
2. Adi (17.6%)
3. Bengali (8.80%)
4. Nepali (8.50%)
5. Hindi (7.30%)
6. Assamese (4.60%)
7. Monpa (5.10%)
8. Wancho (4.30%)
9. Tangsa (3.10%)
10. Mishmi (3.10%)
11. Mishing (3.00%)
12. Nocte (2.90%)
13. Other (11.5%)

Demographics of Arunachal Pradesh – according to the 2011 census of India, the total population of Arunachal Pradesh is 13,82,611, of which 21,201,678 (50.54%) are male and 20,745,680 (49.46%) are female, or 978 females per 1000 males.

=== Religion demographics of Arunachal Pradesh ===
Religion demographics of Arunachal Pradesh – according to the 2011 Indian Census, the religions of Arunachal Pradesh break down as follows:

- Christian: 418,732 (30.26%)
- Hindu: 401,876 (29.04%)
- Others (mostly Donyi-Polo): 362,553 (26.2%)
- Buddhist: 162,815 (11.76%)
- Muslim: 27,045 (1.9%)
- Sikh: 1,865 (0.1%)
- Jain: 216 (<0.1%)

=== Language demographics of Arunachal Pradesh ===
Language demographics of Arunachal Pradesh – Arunachal Pradesh is one of the linguistically richest and most diverse regions in all of Asia, being home to at least 30 and possibly as many as 50 distinct languages in addition to innumerable dialects and subdialects thereof.

== Government and politics of Arunachal Pradesh ==
Politics of Arunachal Pradesh

- Form of government: Indian state government (parliamentary system of representative democracy)
- Capital of Arunachal Pradesh: Itanagar
- Elections in Arunachal Pradesh
  - 1978 Arunachal Pradesh Legislative Assembly election
  - 1980 Arunachal Pradesh Legislative Assembly election
  - 2004 Arunachal Pradesh Legislative Assembly election
  - 2009 Arunachal Pradesh Legislative Assembly election
  - 2014 Arunachal Pradesh Legislative Assembly election;

=== Union government in Arunachal Pradesh ===
- Indian general election, 2009 (Arunachal Pradesh)
- Indian general election, 2014 (Arunachal Pradesh)
- Congressional representation of Arunachal Pradesh
  - Rajya Sabha members from Arunachal Pradesh
  - Arunachal East (Lok Sabha constituency)
  - Arunachal West (Lok Sabha constituency)
  - Arunachal Pradesh Congress Committee

==== Indian military in Arunachal Pradesh ====
- Arunachal Scouts

=== Branches of the government of Arunachal Pradesh ===
Government of Arunachal Pradesh

==== Executive branch of the government of Arunachal Pradesh ====
- Head of state: Governor of Arunachal Pradesh,
  - Raj Bhavan – official residence of the Governor
- Head of government: Chief Minister of Arunachal Pradesh,
- Departments and agencies of Arunachal Pradesh
  - Department of Environment and Forest of Arunachal Pradesh
  - Arunachal Pradesh Public Service Commission

==== Legislative branch of the government of Arunachal Pradesh ====
Arunachal Pradesh Legislative Assembly

- Constituencies of Arunachal Pradesh Legislative Assembly

==== Judicial branch of the government of Arunachal Pradesh ====
- Gauhati High Court

=== Law and order in Arunachal Pradesh ===
- Law enforcement in Arunachal Pradesh
  - Arunachal Pradesh Police

== History of Arunachal Pradesh ==
History of Arunachal Pradesh

=== History of Arunachal Pradesh, by period ===
==== Medieval Arunachal Pradesh ====
History of Arunachal Pradesh[edit] History of Arunachal Pradesh

History of Arunachal Pradesh, by period[edit] Prehistoric Arunachal Pradesh[edit] Ancient Arunachal Pradesh[edit] Medieval Arunachal Pradesh[edit] Colonial Arunachal Pradesh[edit] Contemporary Arunachal Pradesh[edit] North-East Frontier Agency (1951 to 20 January 1972) – part of Assam Union Territory of Arunachal Pradesh (20 January 1972 to 20 February 1987.) History of Arunachal Pradesh, by region[edit] Historical places in Arunachal Pradesh[edit] Gomsi Ita Fort

==== Contemporary Arunachal Pradesh ====
- North-East Frontier Agency (1951 to 20 January 1972) – part of Assam
- Union Territory of Arunachal Pradesh (20 January 1972 to 20 February 1987.)

=== History of Arunachal Pradesh, by region ===
==== Historical places in Arunachal Pradesh ====
- Gomsi
- Ita Fort

== Culture of Arunachal Pradesh ==
Culture of Arunachal Pradesh

- Architecture of Arunachal Pradesh
- Cuisine of Arunachal Pradesh
- Languages of Arunachal Pradesh
  - Language isolates and independent language families in Arunachal
- Monuments in Arunachal Pradesh
  - Monuments of National Importance in Arunachal Pradesh
  - State Protected Monuments in Arunachal Pradesh
- World Heritage Sites in Arunachal Pradesh

=== Art in Arunachal Pradesh ===
- Music of Arunachal Pradesh

=== People of Arunachal Pradesh ===
People of Arunachal Pradesh

- People from Arunachal Pradesh

=== Religion in Arunachal Pradesh ===
Religion in Arunachal Pradesh

- Christianity in Arunachal Pradesh

=== Sports in Arunachal Pradesh ===
Sports in Arunachal Pradesh

- Cricket in Arunachal Pradesh
  - Arunachal Pradesh Cricket Association
- Football in Arunachal Pradesh
  - Arunachal Pradesh Football Association
  - Arunachal Pradesh football team

=== Symbols of Arunachal Pradesh ===
Symbols of Arunachal Pradesh

- State Bird: Hornbill
- State Flower: Foxtail Orchid
- State Animal: Gayal (AKA mithun)
- State Tree: Hollong

== Economy and infrastructure of Arunachal Pradesh ==
Economy of Arunachal Pradesh

- Tourism in Arunachal Pradesh
- Transport in Arunachal Pradesh
  - Roads in Arunachal Pradesh
    - Highways in Arunachal Pradesh
    - Proposed roads
      - East-West Industrial Corridor Highway, Arunachal Pradesh

== Education in Arunachal Pradesh ==
Education in Arunachal Pradesh

- Institutions of higher education in Arunachal Pradesh
  - National Institute of Technology, Arunachal Pradesh
- All Arunachal Pradesh Students' Union

== See also ==
- Outline of India
- Fact about Arunachal Pradesh
