= Geography of Arunachal Pradesh =

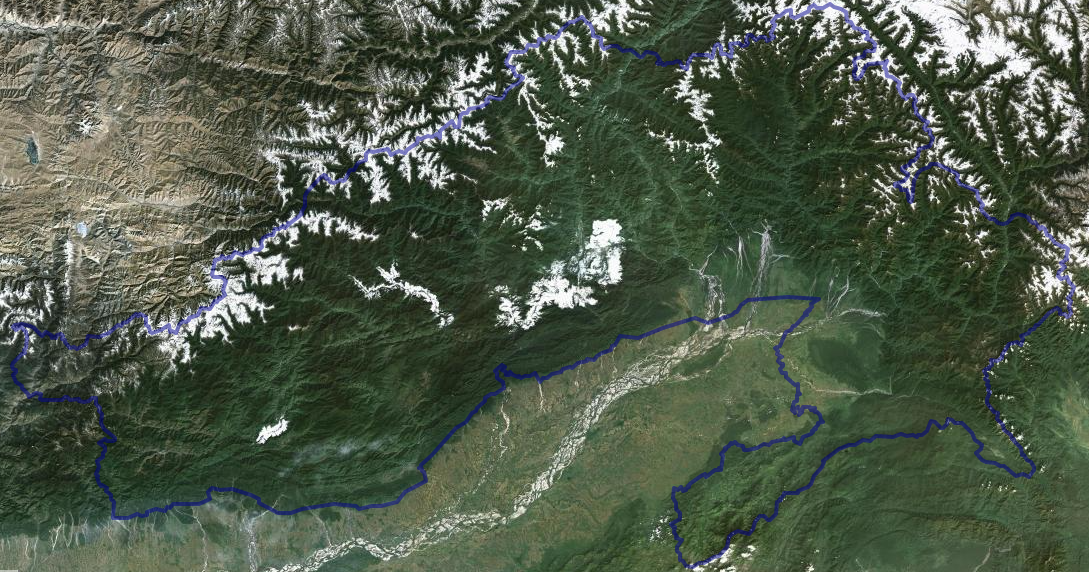
- Region: Northeast India
- Area
  - Total: 83,743 km^{2} (32,333 sq mi)
  - Land: 98.09%
  - Water: 1.91%
- Borders: Bhutan, China, Burma, Assam, Nagaland
- Highest point: Kangto, 7,060 metres (23,160 ft)
- Lowest point: ~50 metres (160 ft)
- Natural resources: Hydro-power Forest cover: 79.63% (2019): Very Dense Forest = 25%; Mod. Dense Forest = 36%; Open Forest = 18%

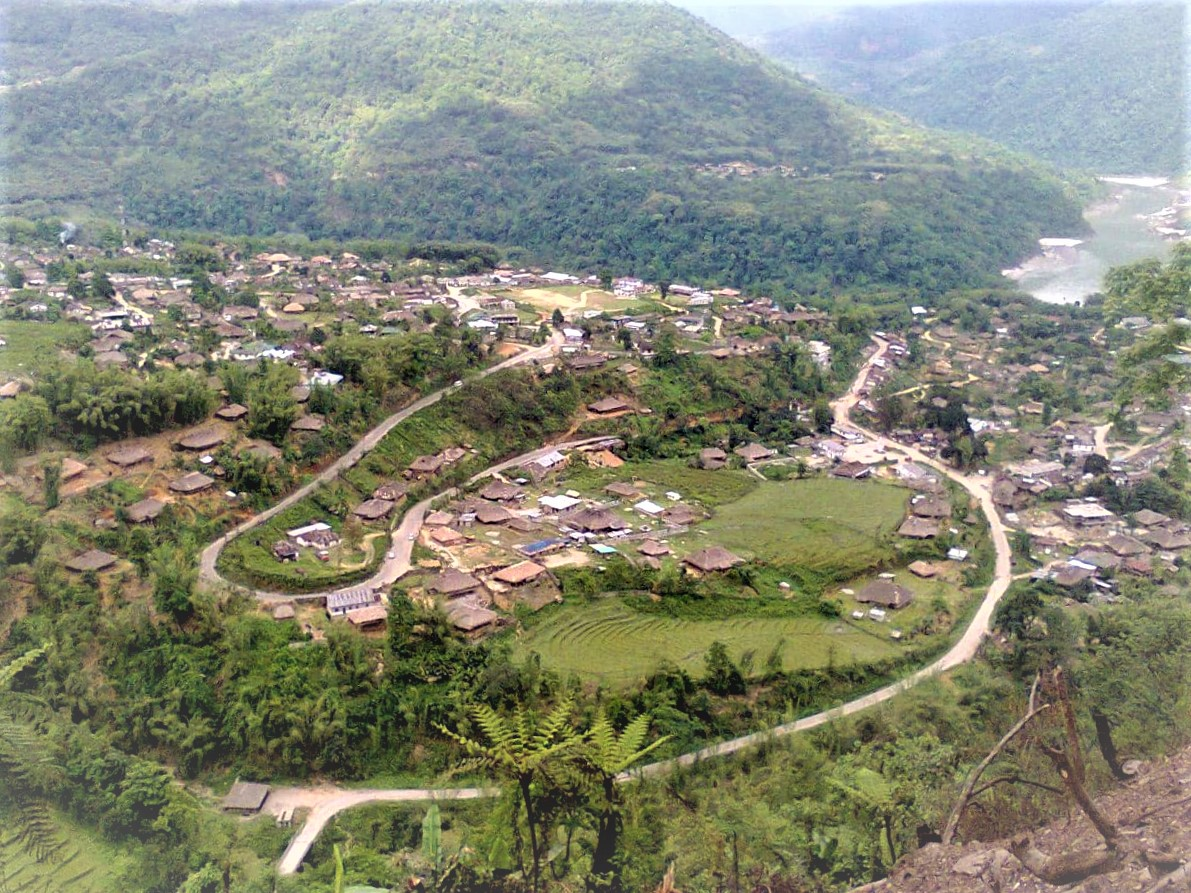
Boleng, Siang district

Arunachal Pradesh is primarily a hilly tract nestled in the foothills of the Himalayas in northeast India. It is spread over an area of 83,743 km^{2} (32,333 sq mi). 98% of the geographical area is land out of which 80% is forest cover; 2% is water. River systems in the region, including those from the higher Himalayas and Patkoi and Arakan Ranges, eventually drain into the Brahmaputra River.

Elevation ranges from mountains that are above 7,000 metres (23,000 ft), to the towns in the plains with an elevation of less than 300 metres (980 ft). Arunachal shares international borders with Bhutan, Tibet (China) and Burma (Myanmar). Internally, Arunachal borders the states of Assam and Nagaland. Arunachal is called the "orchid state of India" and "dawn-lit mountain/Land of Dawn/Land of Dawn-Lit Mountains".

== Area and borders ==
Arunachal Pradesh is located in northeast India, bordering Bhutan, Tibet (China) and Myanmar internationally. The border with Bhutan is 160 km (99 mi), the China border is 1,080 km (670 mi), and the Myanmar border is 440 km (270 mi). Internal borders includes the Assam-Arunachal Pradesh border 804.1 km (499.6 mi), while the border with Nagaland is 55 km (34 mi).

The territory covers 83,743 km^{2} (32,333 sq mi). 98% of the geographical area is land. Most of this land state is hilly terrain, with flat land covering about 4,450 km^{2} (1,720 sq mi). Water covers 2% of the area. It is the 14th largest among the states and union territories of India by area.

== Physical geography ==
=== Topography and relief ===
Relief range varies between plains that are a few hundred meters in height and mountains above 7,000 metres (23,000 ft). The elevation of the towns of Naharlagun, Pasighat and Tezu in the south are 290 m, 155 m and 210 m respectively, while Kangto, Nyegi Kangsang and the Gorichen group of mountains are some of the highest peaks in this region of the Himalayas. The southern borders of Arunachal Pradesh are encompassed by the Shivalik ranges which merge into plains. The hills and mountains have associated features such as valleys and intermontane plateaus, that is plateaus between mountains.

Passes and mountains in Arunachal, or on or close to its borders.

Legend：
1: Gori Chen 2: Kangto 3: Bum La Pass 4: Yonggyap La 5: Nyegyi Kansang 6: Diphu Pass 7: Sela Pass 8: Dzo La 9: Chubumbu La 10: Gyoa La 11: Lo La 12: Shagam La 13: Tama La 14: Tapgyu La 15: Chupung La 16: Kashong La 17: Andra La 18: Zhabu La 19: Kaya La 20: Pangsau Pass 21: Kumjawng Pass 22: Chaukan Pass 23: Hpungan Pass 24: Dafla Range High Point 25: Dapha Bum 26: Pakhain Range High Point 27: Tulung La 28: Chumo 29: Lusha Pass 30: Kangri Karpo La 31: Adjamkho La 32: Tsang Khang La 33: Glei Dakhru 34: Mayodia Pass 35: Kepang La 36: Siang Pass 37: Aguia La 38: Hadigra Dakhru 39: Milakatong La 40: Chera La 41: Tse La 42: Poshing La 43: Shoka La 44: Tunga La 45: Vorjing Peak 46: Lamdo La

47: Tsangdhar

Major Mountains and their Peaks
Mountain name	Peak	Coordinates	Refs
Kangto ^{#}	7,089 metres (23,258 ft)	27.865°N 92.532°E	
Nyegyi Kansang ^{#}	7,047 metres (23,120 ft)	27.936°N 92.666°E	
Chumo ^{#}	6,890 metres (22,600 ft)	27.909°N 92.625°E	
Tapka Shiri ^{#} **	6,565 metres (21,539 ft)	28.176°N 92.767°E	
Gori Chen	6,530 metres (21,420 ft)	27.795°N 92.387°E	
Shalundi	4,810 metres (15,780 ft)		
Dapha Bum	4,578 metres (15,020 ft)	27.660°N 96.699°E	
Komdi	4,185 metres (13,730 ft)		
Vorjing	3,991 metres (13,094 ft)	28.525°N 94.100°E	
Ladu	3,041 metres (9,977 ft)		
^{#} Mountain (as compared to the peak) is located in both India and China: This is not Dakpa Sheri, 5,735 metres (18,816 ft)

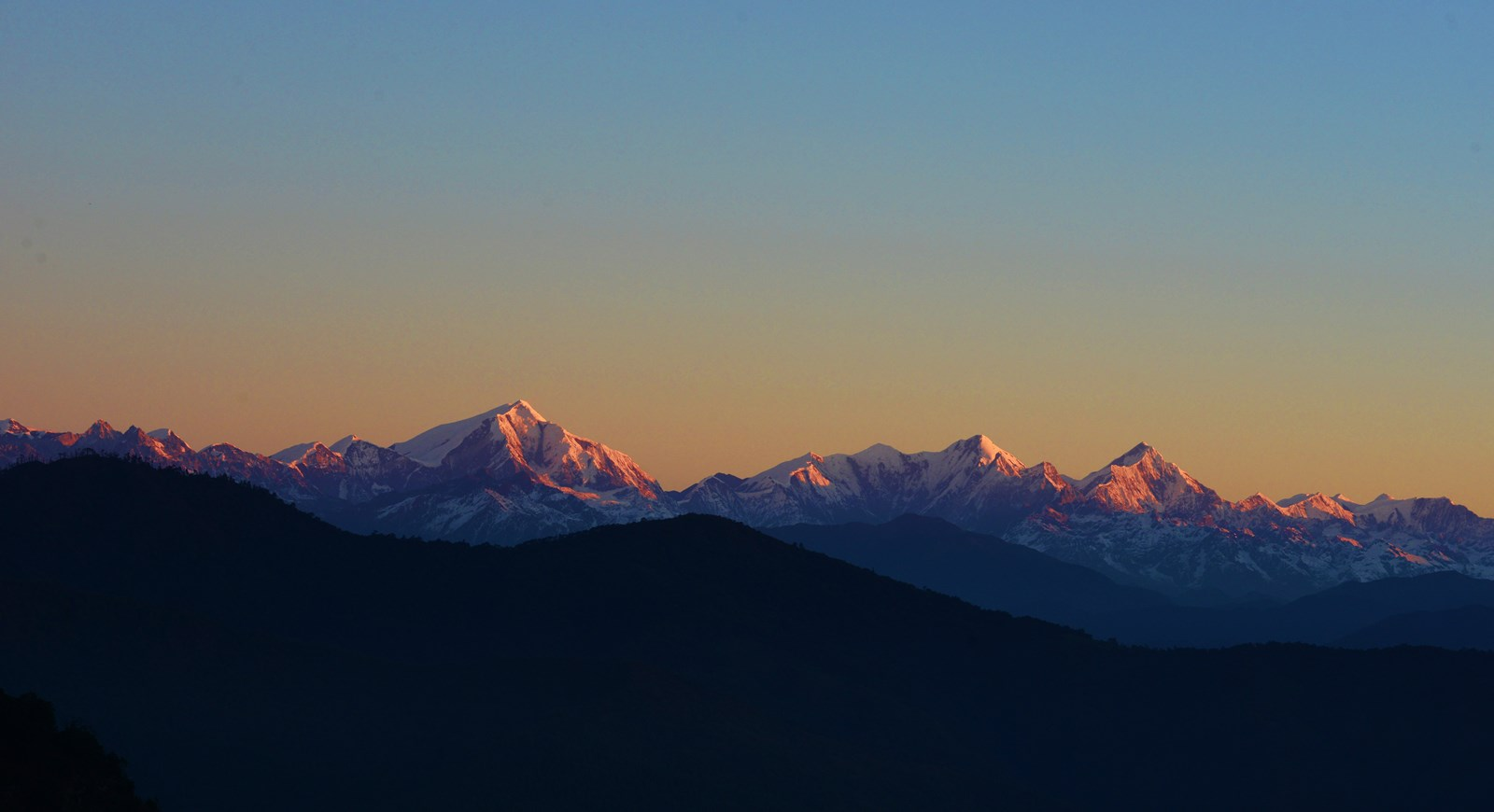
Gorichen group

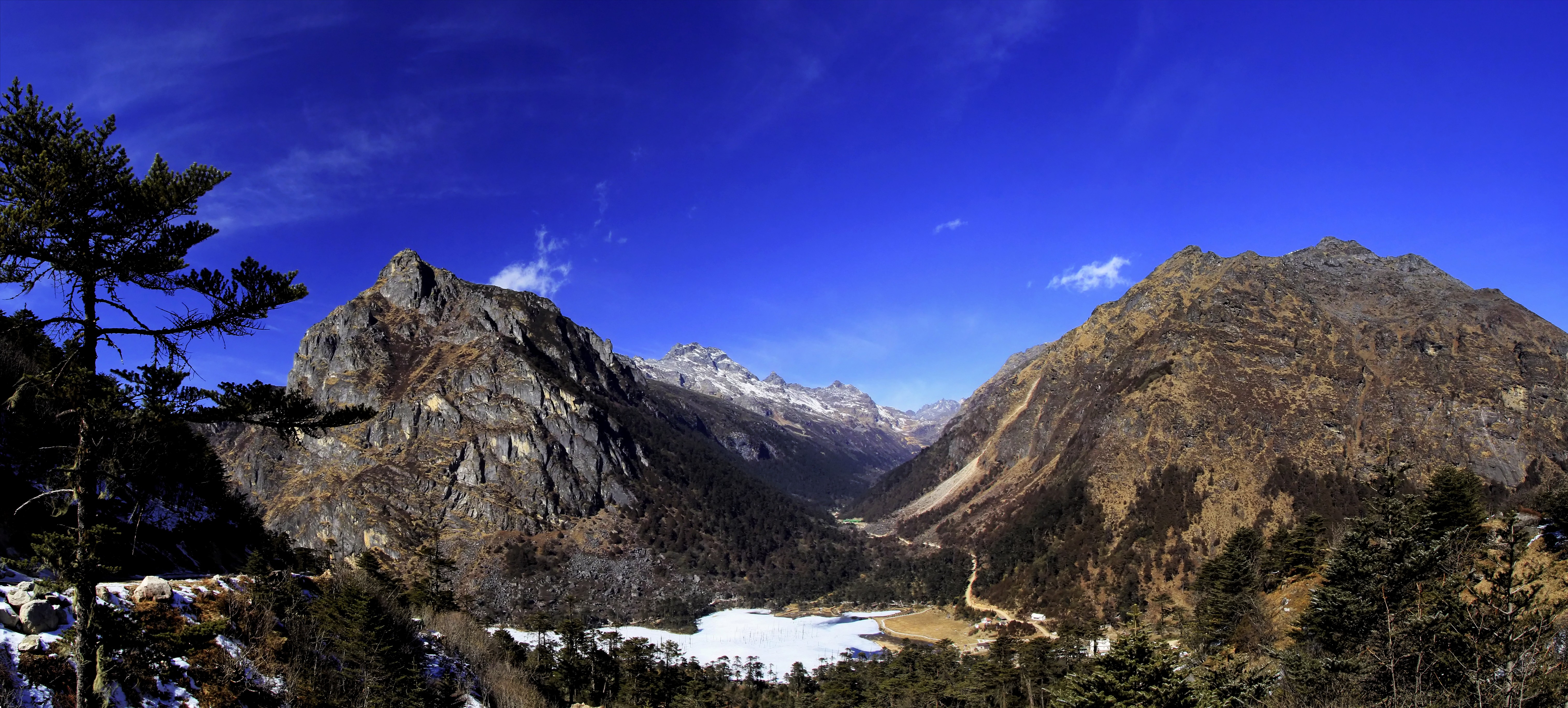
Sangetsar Tso

Parts of the Lohit district, Changlang district and Tirap district are covered by the Patkai hills. The hills extend towards Nagaland, and form a natural boundary between India and Burma.

Namcha Barwa Himal range extends into India up to Siyom River.

Major hills found in this region include:

- Aka Hills
- Daphla Hills
- Miri Hills
- Abor Hills
- Mishmi Hills
- Patkai Hills
Hills and altitudes of selected towns in the state.

=== Drainage and river systems ===
Water/wetland cover is 154,609 hectares (1,546.09 km^{2}) or 1.91% of the total area. Out of this, 86% of wetlands are rivers. Lohit district and Dibang Valley district have the highest number of wetlands in the state.

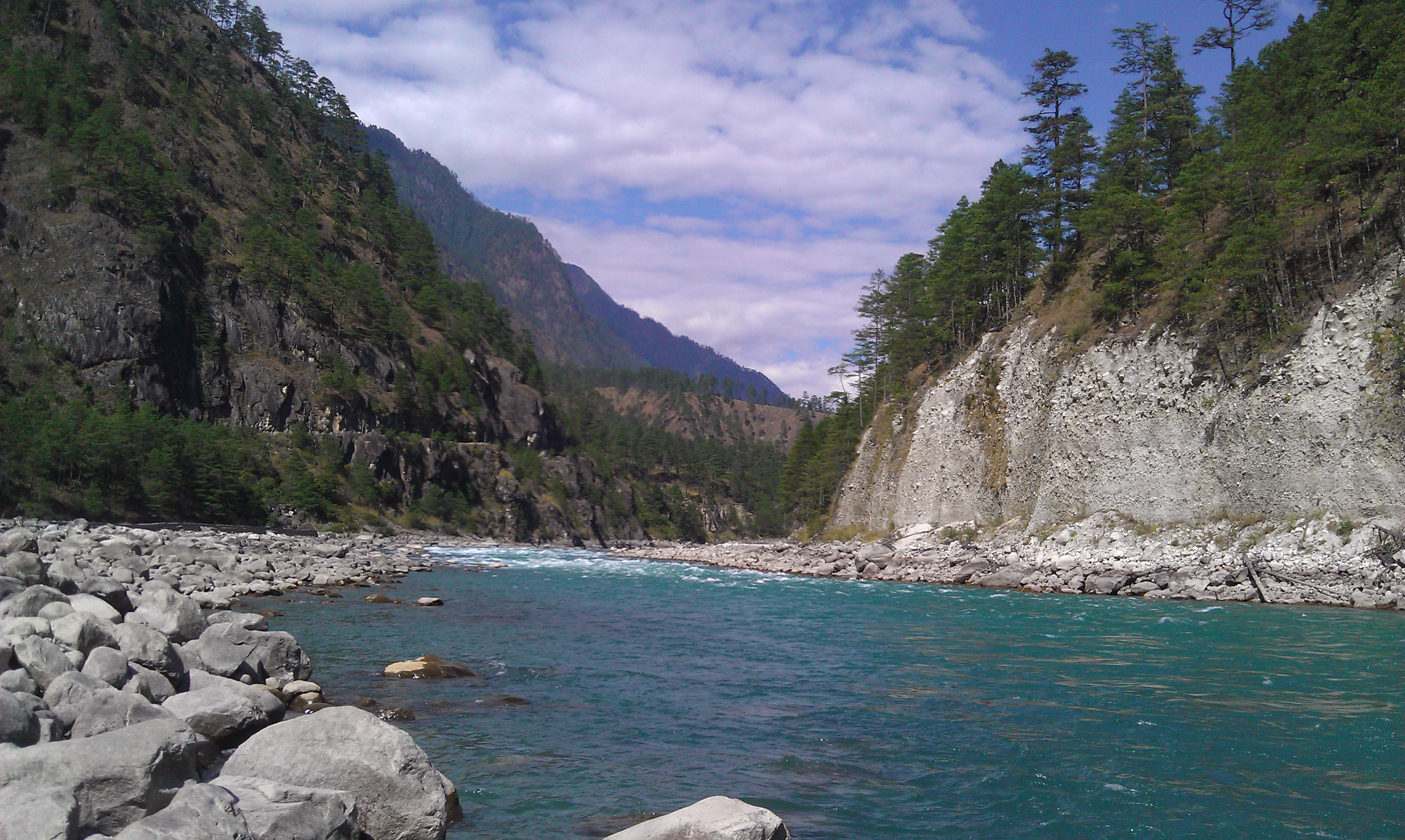
Lohit River

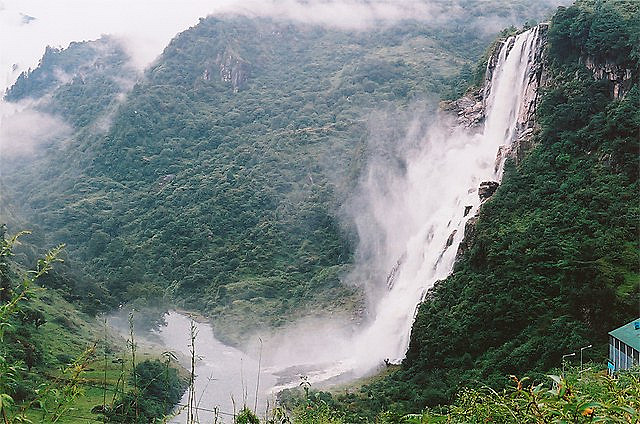
Nuranang Falls

The major river systems are (from west to east clockwise):

- Kameng
- Subansiri
- Siang
- Dibang
- Lohit

All of these are fed by snow from the Himalayas and numerous rivers and rivulets and eventually flow into Siang/Brahmaputra. Abrasion by the rivers which flow through the mountains has created a broad valley, which is a major feature of the geography of the state.

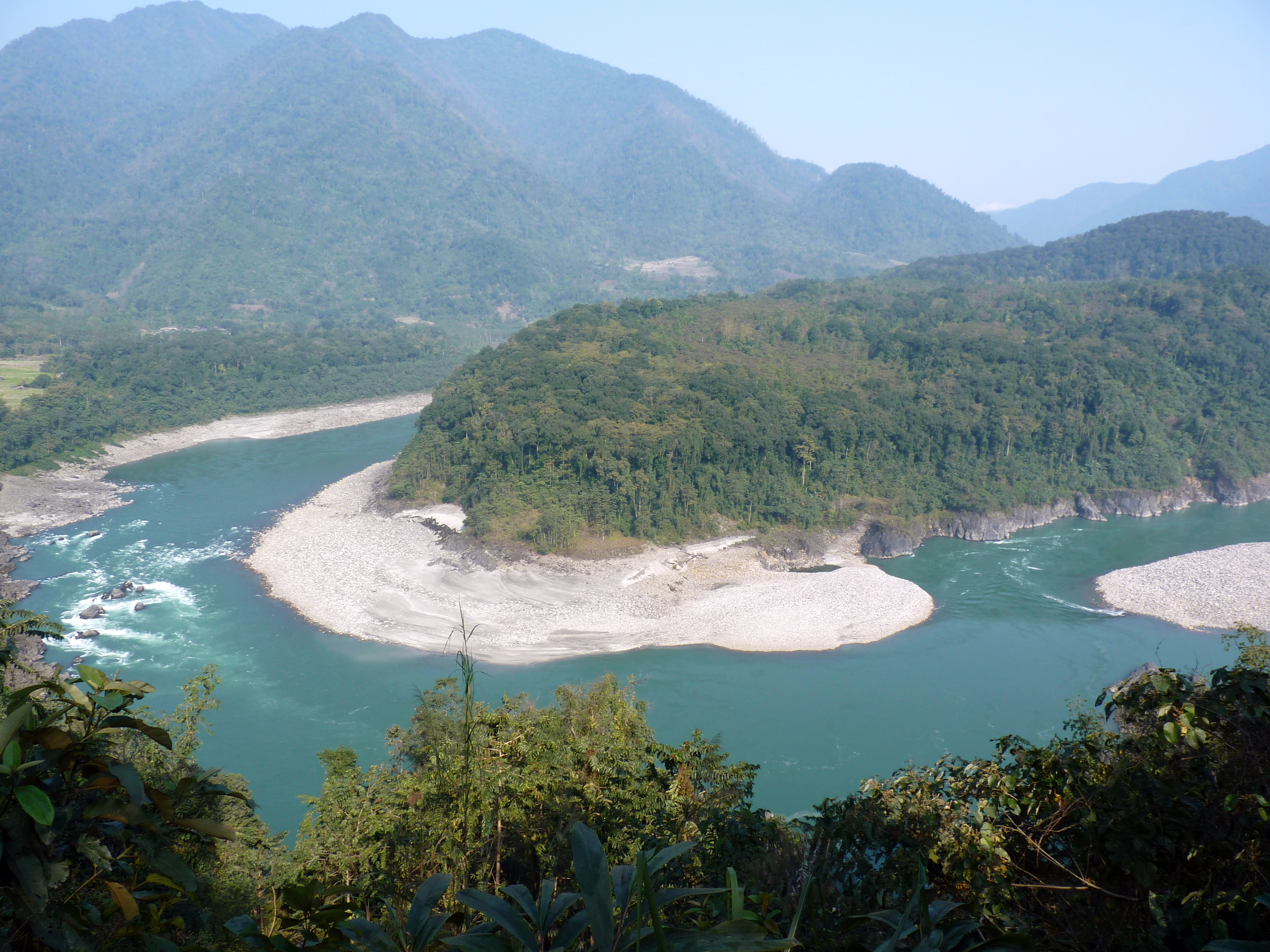
River Siyom

Other rivers include Tawang Chu, Dikrong, Ranga, Kamala/Kamla, Kamplang, Siyum, Dihing/ Noadihing and Tirap.

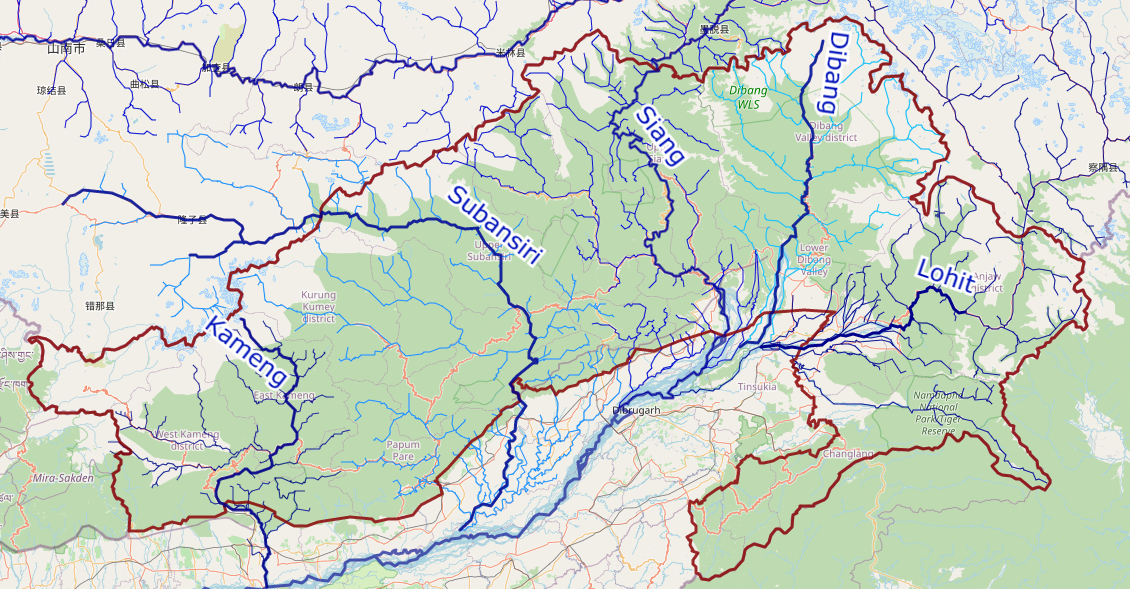
Major rivers in Arunachal and their basins

Four major river basins of the state

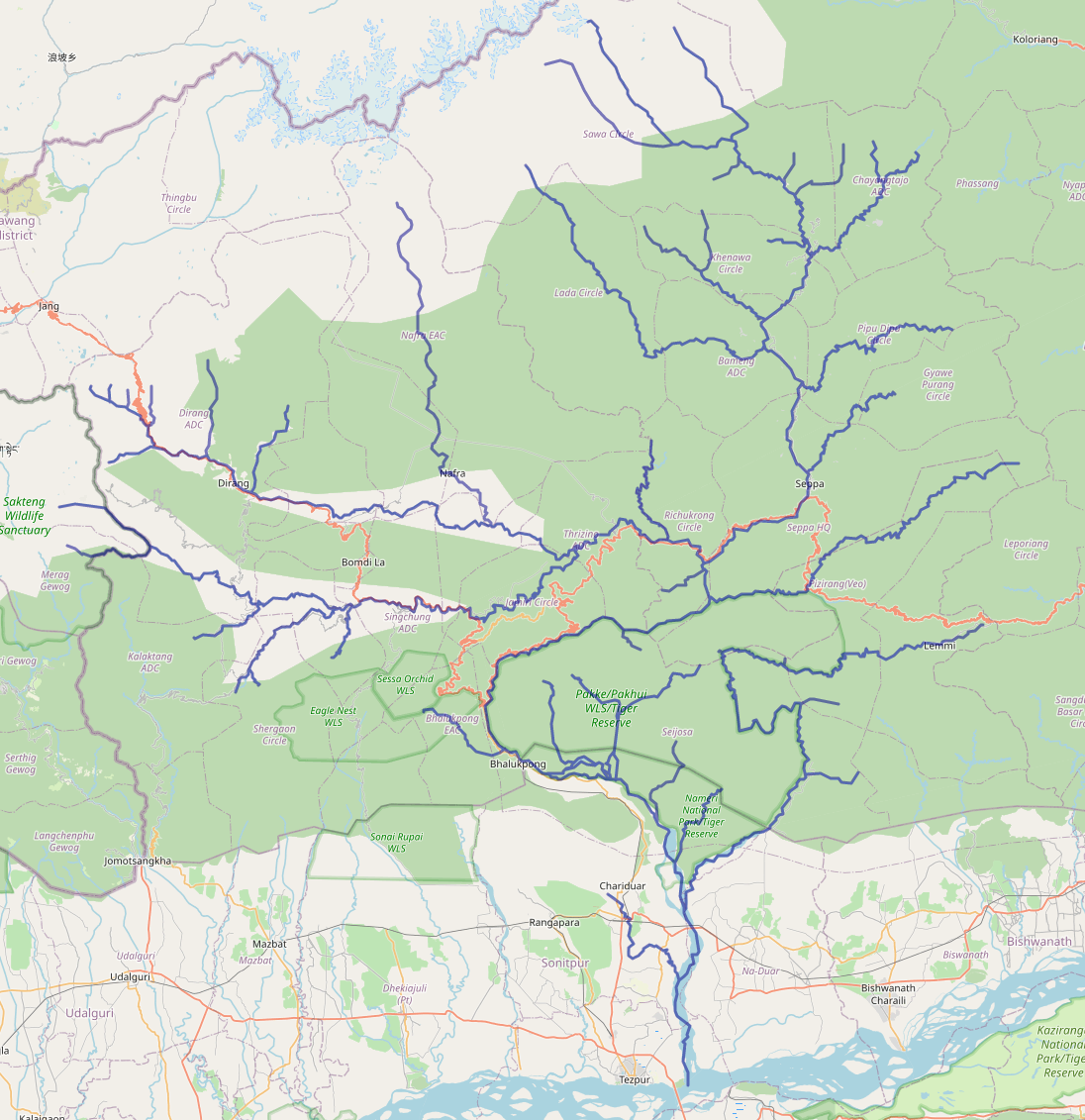
Kameng River Basin

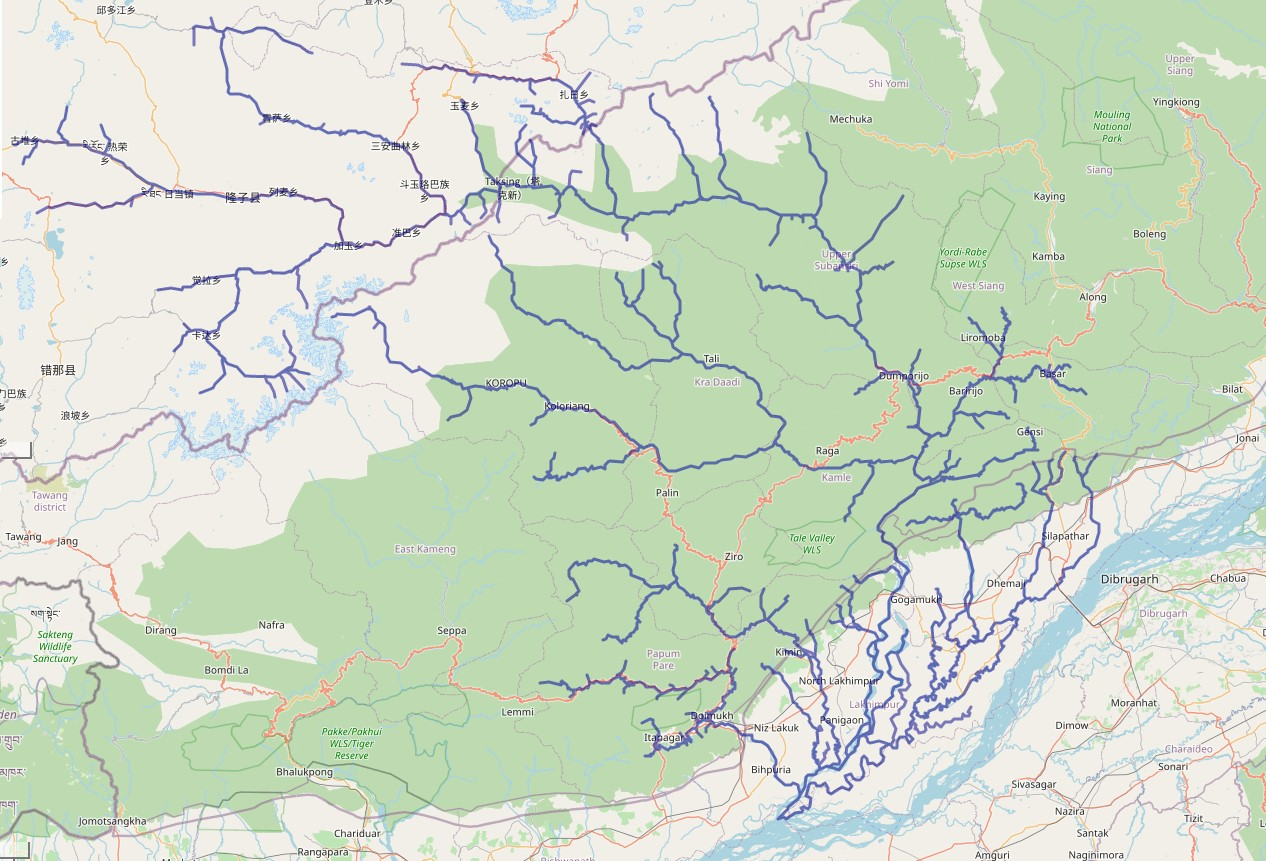
Subansiri River basin

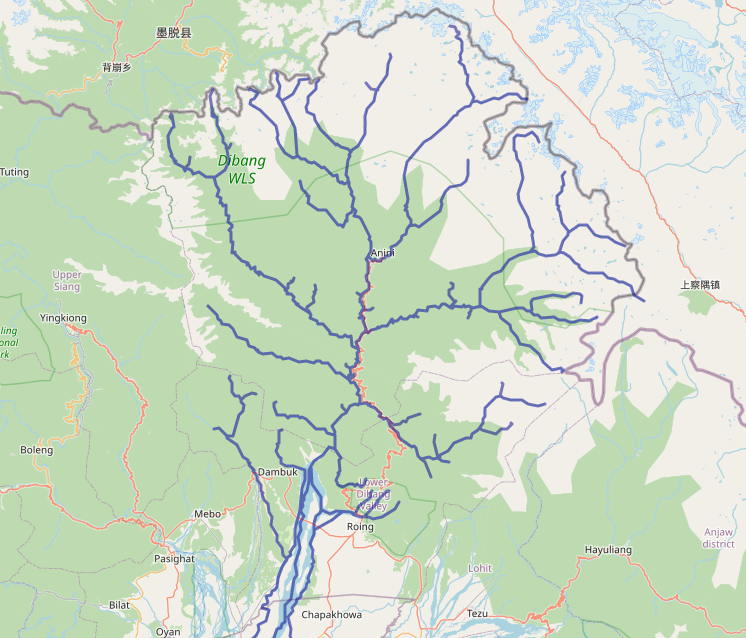
Dibang River basin

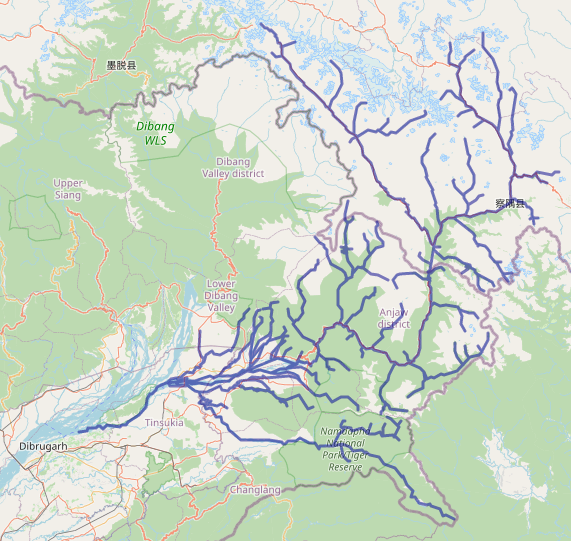
Lohit River basin

== Biodiversity ==
=== Eco-regions and forest types ===
Arunachal consists of a number of eco-regions. At the lowest elevations, at Arunachal Pradesh's border with Assam, are the Brahmaputra Valley semi-evergreen forests. Much of the state, including the Himalayan foothills and the Patkai hills, are home to Eastern Himalayan broadleaf forests. Towards the northern border with Tibet, with increasing elevation, come a mixture of Eastern and Northeastern Himalayan subalpine conifer forests followed by Eastern Himalayan alpine shrub and meadows.

Ecoregions

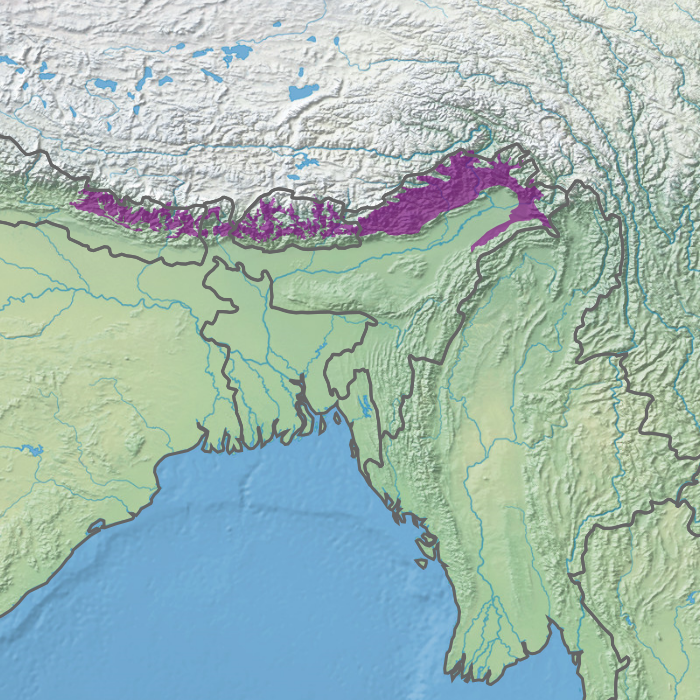
Eastern Himalayan broadleaf forests

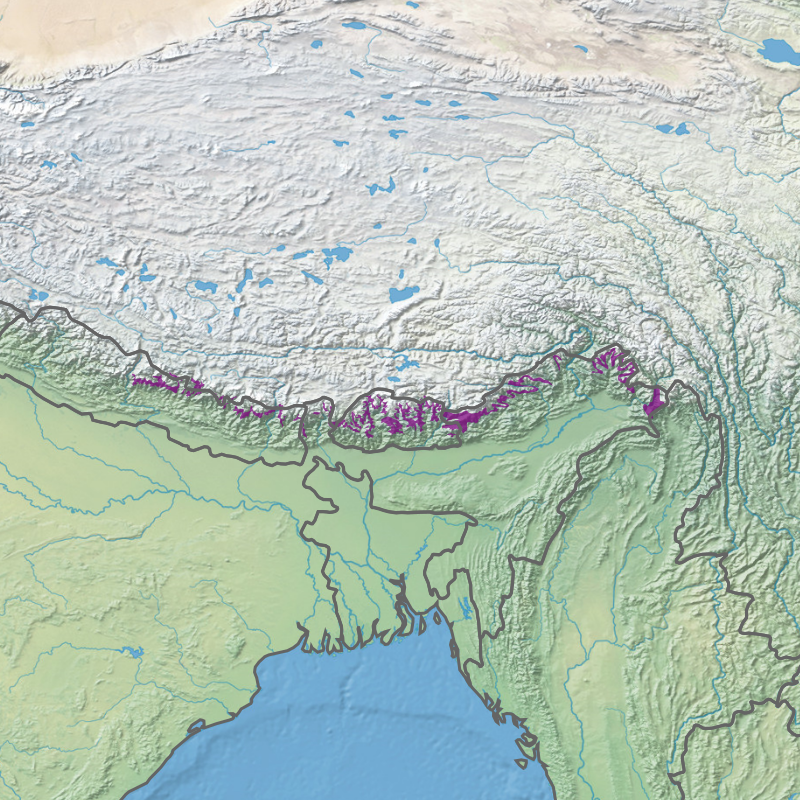
Eastern Himalayan subalpine conifer forests

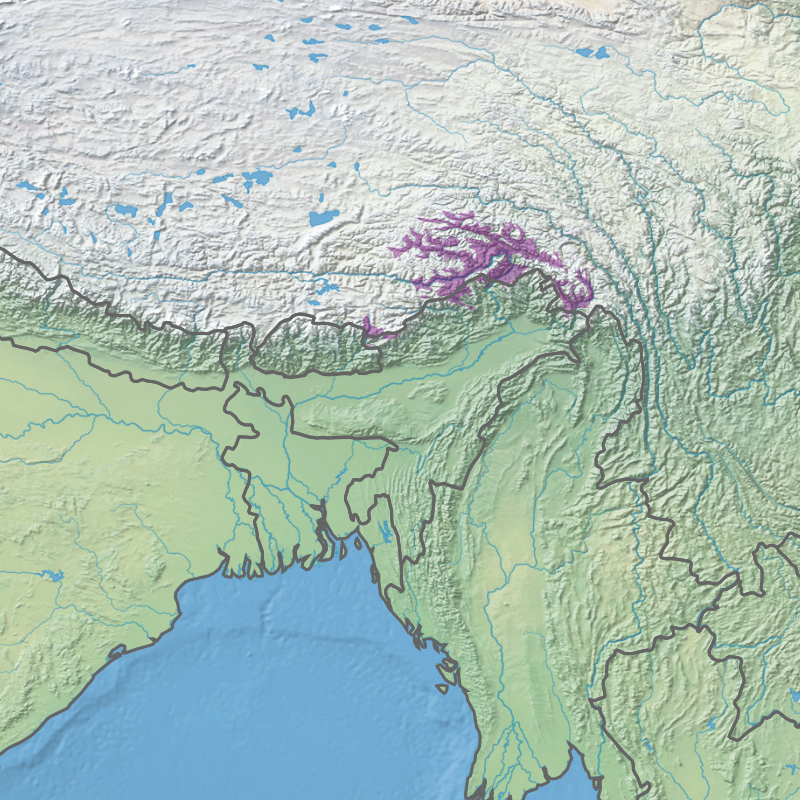
Northeastern Himalayan subalpine conifer forests

Brahmaputra Valley semi-evergreen forests

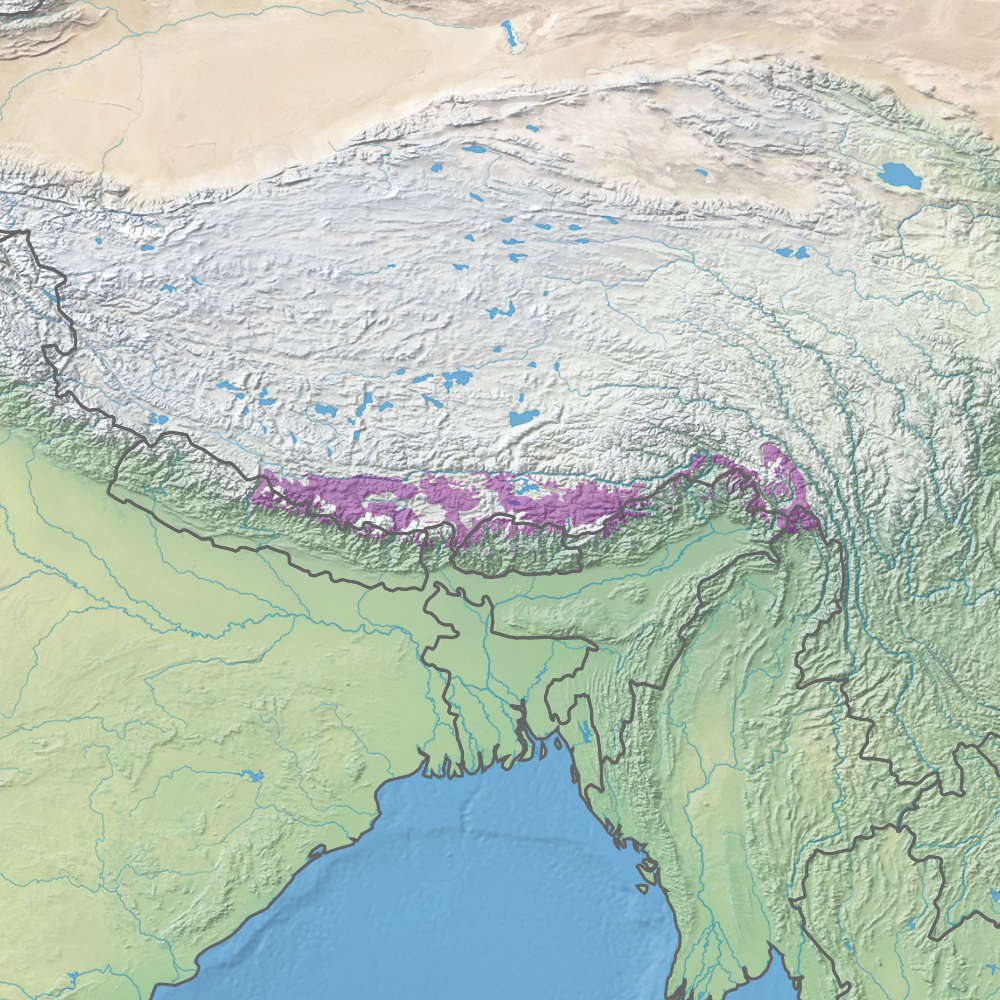
Eastern Himalayan alpine shrub and meadows

Climatically, the forests can be categorised as Tropical forests, subtropical forests, temperate forest, subalpine coniferous forest, alpine and secondary forests. At the lowest elevations, densely forested areas are seen with the trees ranging from seasonal tropical forest to broadleaf and semi-alpine coniferous forests. Alpine shrubs and meadows follow, ultimately leading to ice-clad peaks.

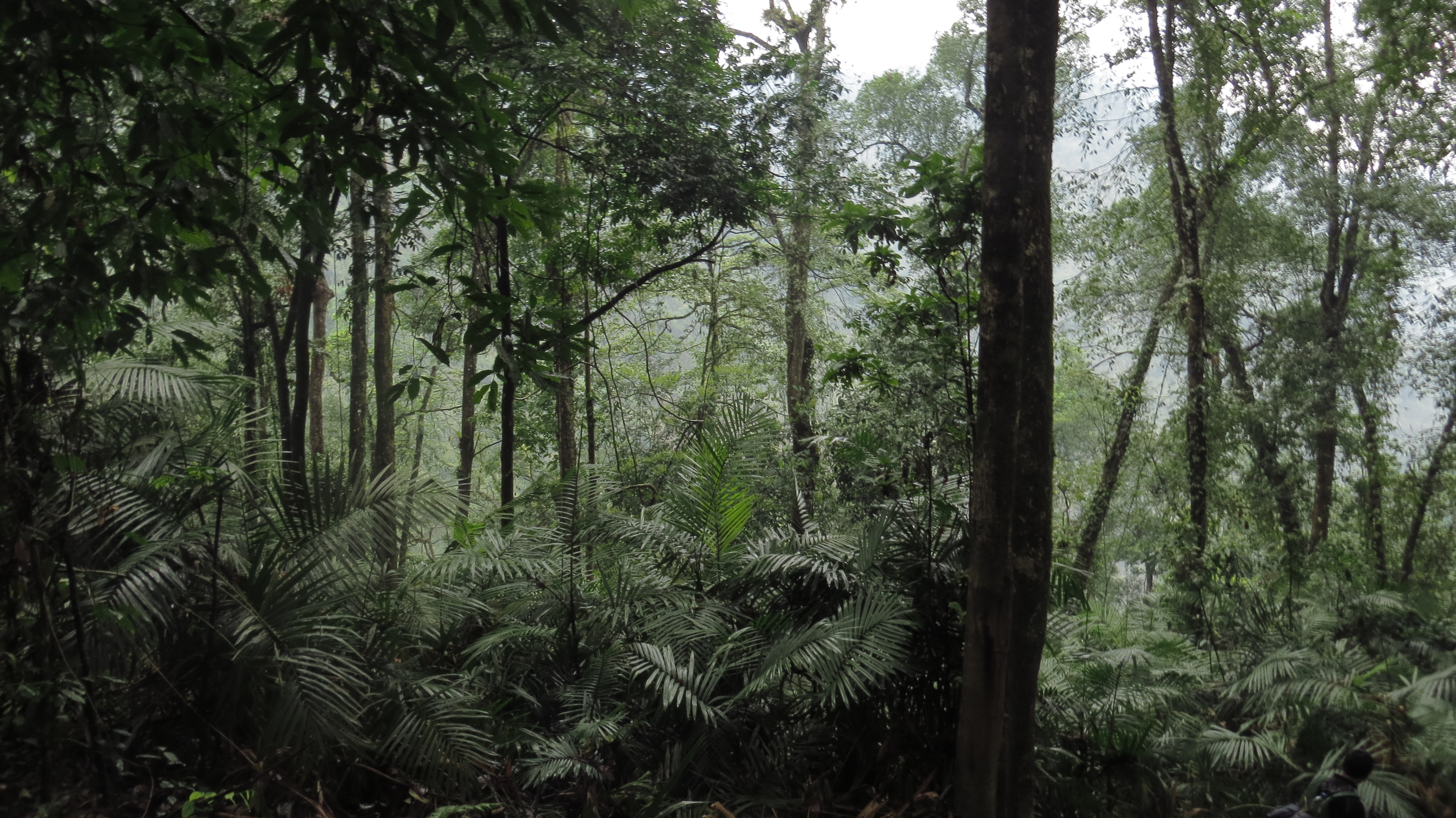
Evergreen forest of Pakke, Aurnachal Pradesh.

The Forest Research Institute of India's India State of Forest Report 2019 lists area under different forest types in the state. The major forest types as a percentage of the forest cover area are:

- East Himalayan Sub-Tropical Wet Hill Forest = 24.35%
- East Himalayan Wet Temperate Forest = 22.92%
- East Himalayan Sub-Alpine Birch/Fir Forest = 13.46%
- Alpine Pastures = 6.73%
- Sub-Himalayan Light Alluvial Semi-Evergreen Forest = 6.60%
- Others = Remaining

Forest cover varies from 54% in Tawang district to 92% in Papum Pare district. There are 110 species of trees.

Protected areas include the Dihang-Dibang Biosphere Reserve, Namdapha National Park, Mouling National Park, and 11 wildlife sanctuaries and reserves including elephant reserves, tiger reserves and an orchid sanctuary, (Note: D'Ering Memorial Wildlife Sanctuary, Dibang Wildlife Sanctuary, Eaglenest Wildlife Sanctuary, Itanagar Wildlife Sanctuary, Kameng Elephant Reserve, Kamlang Wildlife Sanctuary, Mehao Wildlife Sanctuary, Pakke Tiger Reserve, Talle Valley Wildlife Sanctuary, Dibang Wildlife Sanctuary and Sessa Orchid Sanctuary) covering about 12% of the geographical area of the state.

=== Flora and fauna ===
Flora and fauna in the state includes over 4000 species of flowering plants, 600 bird species, 200 fish species, 42 amphibian species, 85 terrestrial mammals and a wide number of insects, butterflies and reptiles. Orchids, fern, bamboo, cane, rhododendrons, oak, hedychiums, and various medicinal plants form a diverse range of the state's green cover. Among the crops grow are rice, nigros, maize, millet, wheat, pulses, sugarcane, ginger, and oilseeds. Arunachal is also ideal for horticulture and fruit orchards. Its major industries are rice mills, fruit preservation and processing units, and handloom handicrafts Apart from them, the forests of Arunachal are also home to a large number of people belonging to the different tribes. These tribal people, aloof from urbanization, dwell in these forests where the various forest-based products form a part of their livelihood. Right from the south of the state where the altitude is low we get to see a variety of trees like teak, sal, gutjan, more.

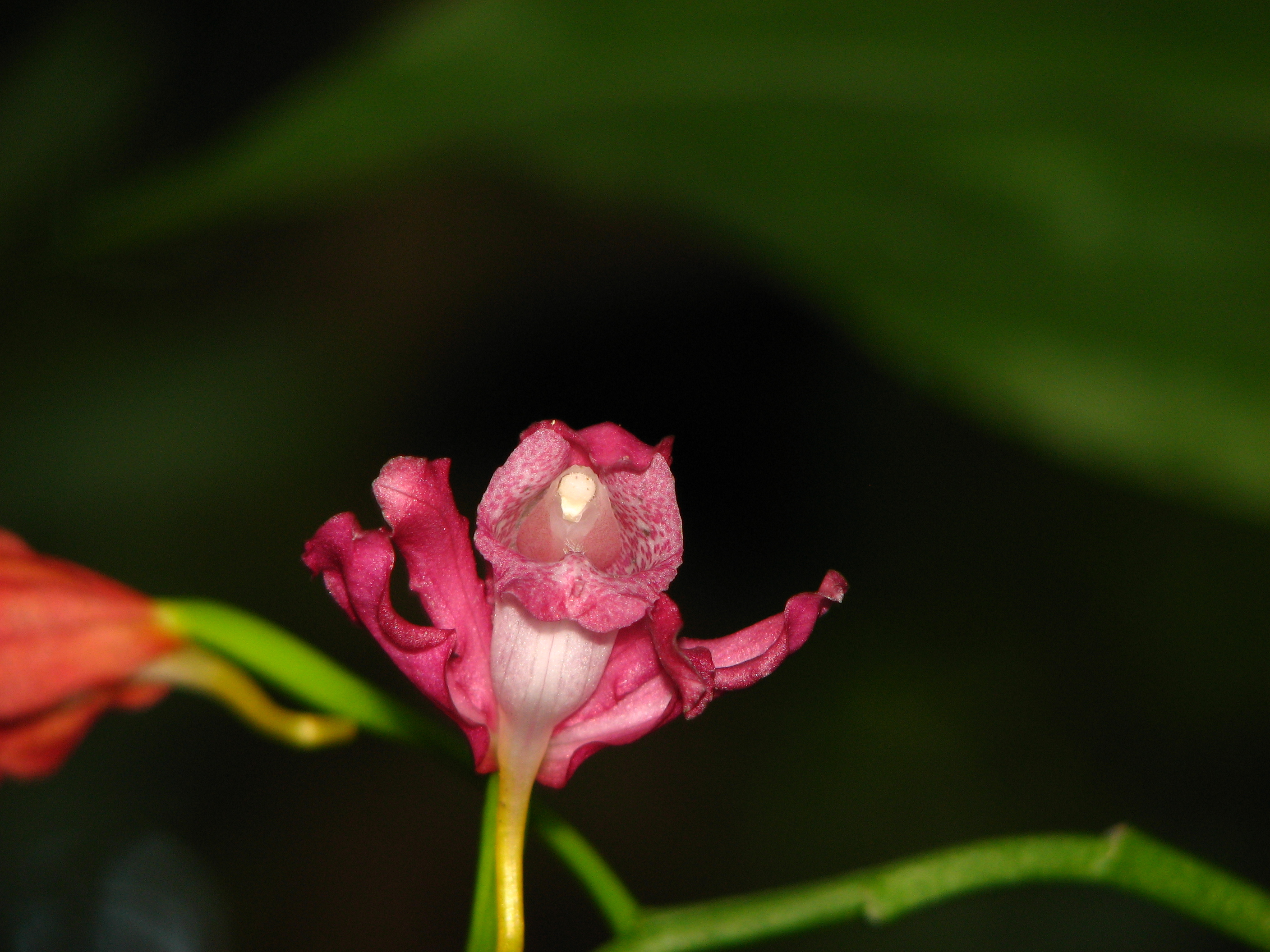
The Strobilanthus flower at the Namdapha National Park

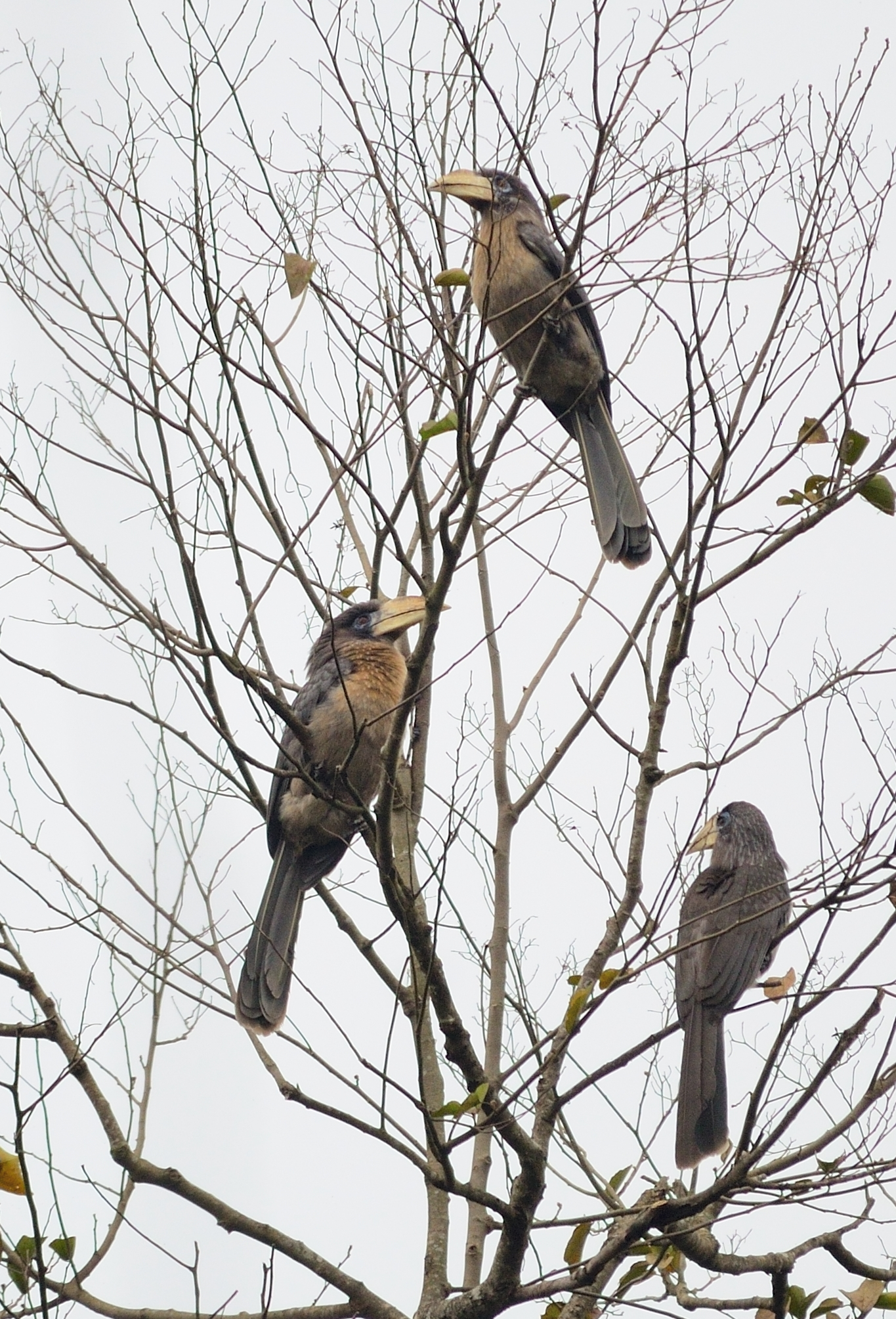
Hornbills at the Namdapha National Park

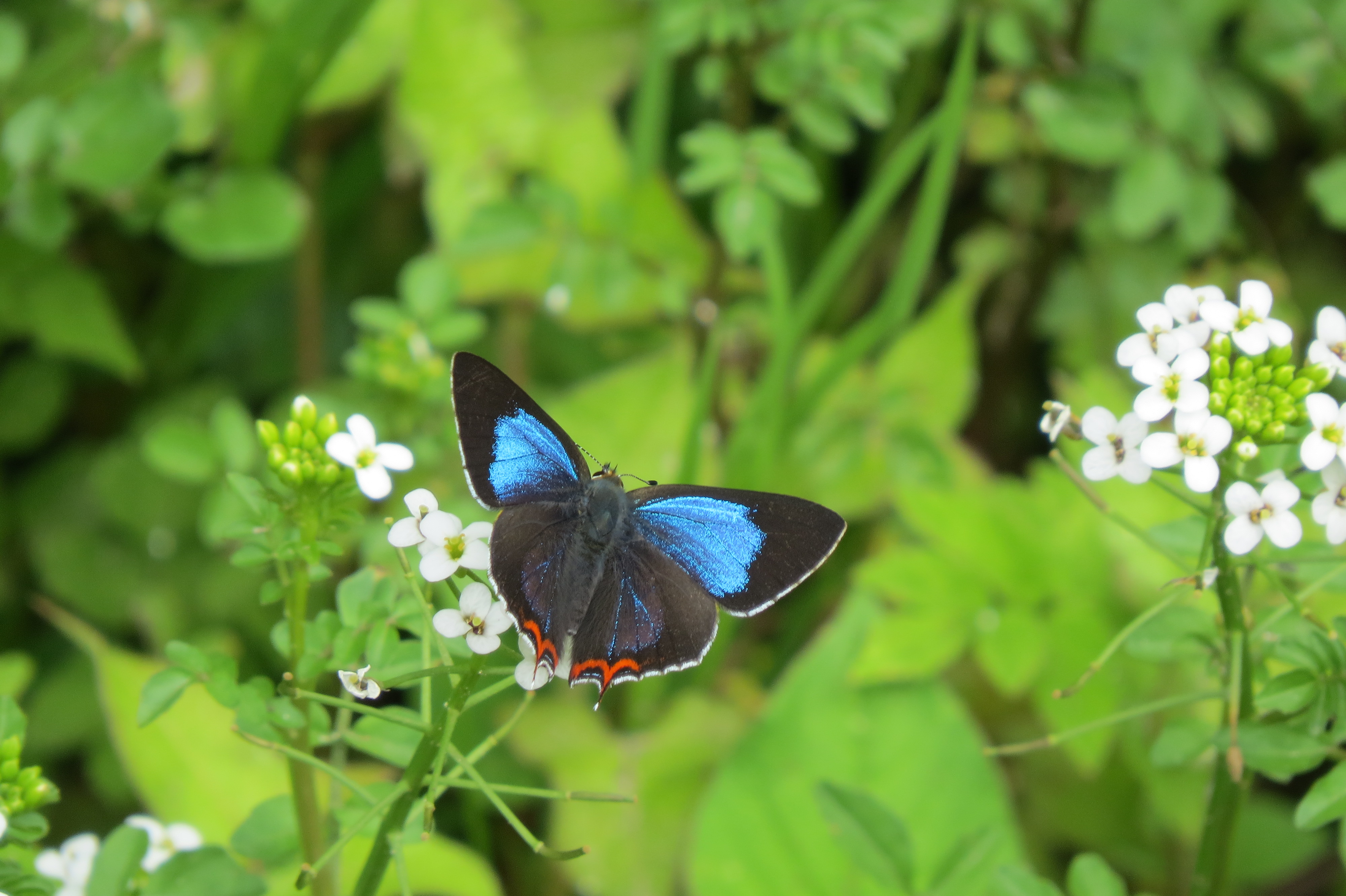
Male azure sapphire

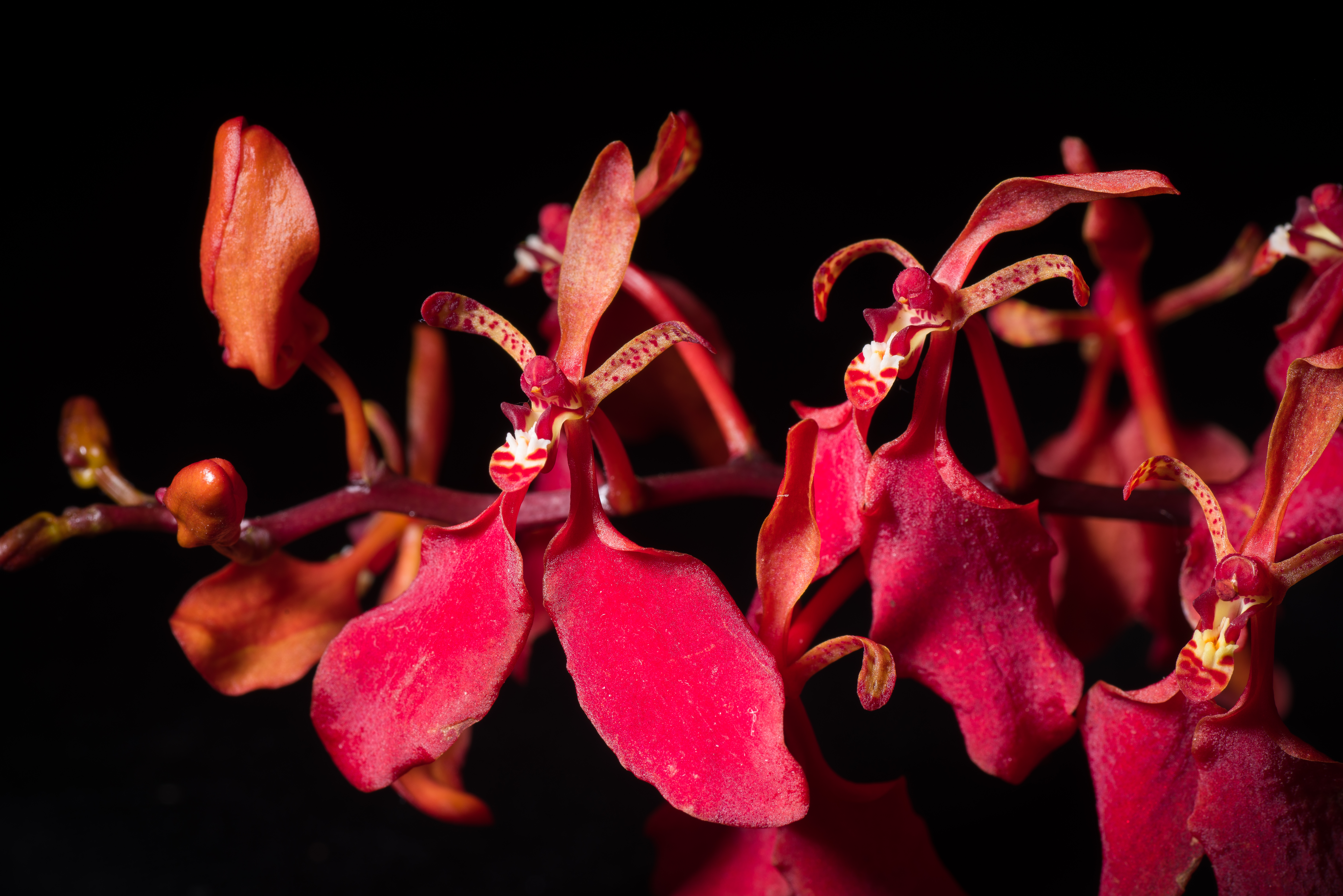
Renanthera imschootiana

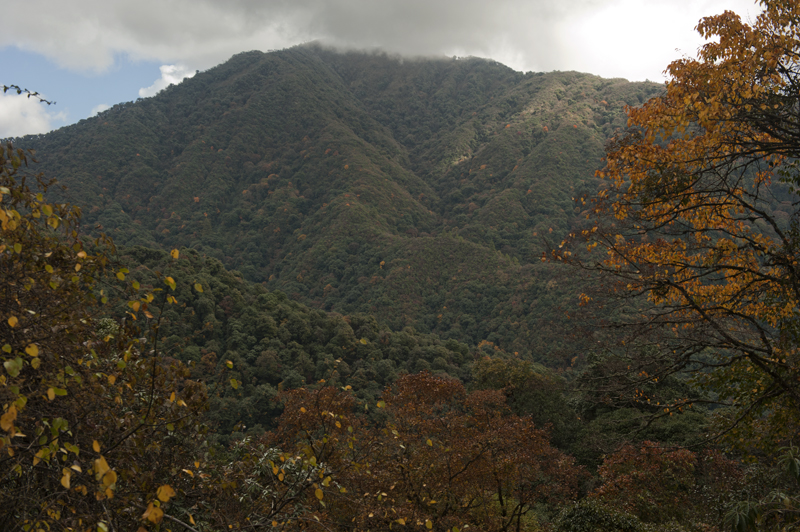
View of Eaglenest forest canopy

== Climatic conditions ==
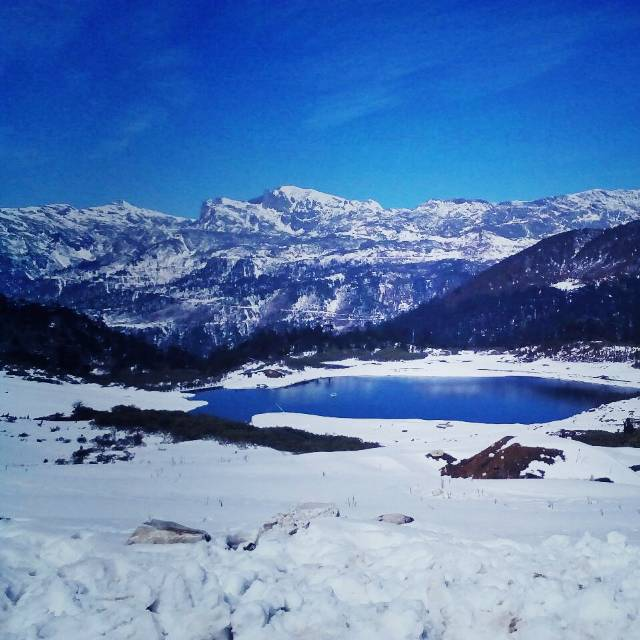
Sela

As per the Köppen–Geiger climate classification system, the most prevalent climate types in the state are humid subtropical climate and monsoon-influenced humid subtropical climate. Other climates include subtropical highland climate, monsoon-influenced warm-summer humid continental climate and monsoon-influenced subarctic climate.

The regions in the lower belts of the state experience hot and humid climates, with a maximum temperature in the foothills reaching up to 40 °C (during the summer). The average temperature in this region in winter ranges from 15° to 21 °C while that during the monsoon season remains between 22° and 30 °C.

Arunachal Pradesh experiences heavy rainfall during May to September. The average rainfall recorded in Arunachal Pradesh is 300 centimeters, varying between 80 centimeters and 450 centimeters.

== Human geography ==
=== Administrative divisions ===
Districts of Arunachal Pradesh since 2018
Legend： Capital Year created 2018 Year created 2017 Year created 2015 Created before 2015

== See also ==
- Dihang-Dibang Biosphere Reserve

== Bibliography ==
Books

- Sharma, N.; Shukla, Surya Pal (1992). Geography and Development of Hill Areas: A Case Study of Arunachal Pradesh. Mittal Publications. ISBN 9788170993834 – via Google Books.
- Singh, Ravi S. (2005). Paths of Development in Arunachal Pradesh. Northern Book Centre. ISBN 9788172111830.
- Mizuno, Kazuharu; Tenpa, Lobsang (2015). Himalayan Nature and Tibetan Buddhist Culture in Arunachal Pradesh, India: A Study of Monpa. Springer. ISBN 9784431554929 – via Google Books.
- Singh, Achom Darshan; Abujam, Santoshkumar; Das, D.N. (2019). Biodiversity of Fishes in Arunachal Himalaya. Academic Press, Elsevier. ISBN 978-0-12-815837-1.

Government

- India State of Forest Report 2019 (PDF), vol. 1 (16 ed.), Forest Survey of India. Ministry of Environment, Forest and Climate Change. Government of India., ISBN 9788194101802, archived from the original (PDF) on 8 March 2021
- "11.2 Arunachal Pradesh" (PDF), India State of Forest Report 2019, vol. 2 (16 ed.), Forest Survey of India. Ministry of Environment, Forest and Climate Change. Government of India., ISBN 9788194101802, archived from the original (PDF) on 4 July 2021
- National Wetland Atlas: Arunachal Pradesh (PDF), SAC/RESA/AFEG/NWIA/ATLAS/06/2009, Space Applications Centre (ISRO), Ahmedabad, India, p. 98, archived from the original (PDF) on 28 July 2013. (This is a PDF Size:59.00MB)
- Director (Zoological Survey of India, Kolkata), ed. (2006). Fauna of Arunachal Pradesh Part-1 (PDF). Published by the Director, Zoological Survey of India, Kolkata. ISBN 81-8171-086-X. Archived from the original (PDF) on 20 June 2017.
- Arunachal Pradesh State Action Plan on Climate Change. Consortium: INRM, IIMA, IISc. (PDF), March 2011
- State Profile of Arunachal Pradesh (PDF), Branch MSME-Development Institute. Itanagar, Arunachal Pradesh., Development Commissioner. Ministry of Micro, Small and Medium Enterprises. Government of India., 2013–2014, archived from the original (PDF) on 31 July 2021
- Arunachal Pradesh: Human Development Report 2005 (PDF), Prepared by Rajiv Gandhi University, Itanagar, Arunachal Pradesh. Planning Commission, NITI Aayog., Department of Planning, Government of Arunachal Pradesh.
