= Tirap =

Tirap can refer to:

- Tirap district, district in Arunachal Pradesh
- Tirap River, river that flows in Tirap district
- Tirap, Kenya
- TIRAP, toll-interleukin 1 receptor domain containing adaptor protein
