= Sharad Kulkarni =

Indian mountaineer

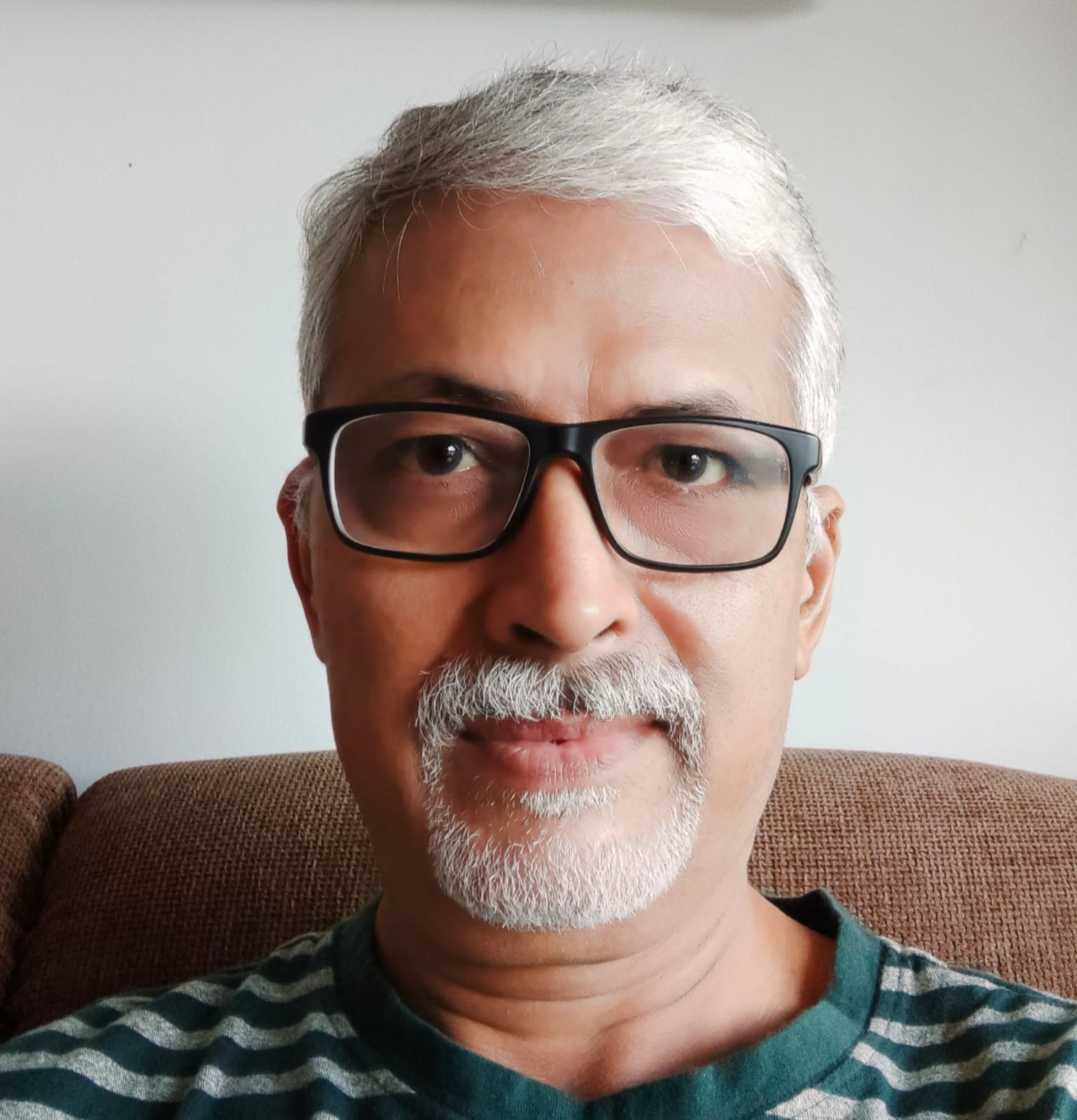

Personal information
- Nationality: Indian
- Born: December 20, 1962 (age 63) Beed, Maharastra
- Spouse: Anjali Sharad Kulkarni

Climbing career
- Major ascents: 7 Summits All Around The World

Sharad Kulkarni is an Indian mountaineer. On 23 May 2023, Sharad climbed Mount Everest, aged 60 years and 6 months (for the second time earlier in 2019), becoming the oldest Indian to reach the summit. He became the oldest Indian to climb the Seven Summits.

== Peaks scaled ==
| Date | Peaks | Regions |
|---|---|---|
| 19 Sep 2024 | Gorichen | Asia |
| 23 July 2023 | Mount Everest | Asia |
| 16 December 2022 | Mount Vinson | Antarctica |
| 20 June 2022 | Denali | Alaska, North America |
| 14 August 2021 | Mount Elbrus | Russia |
| 29 January 2020 | Mount Aconcagua | South America |
| 22 May 2019 | Mount Everest | Asia |
| 8 October 2014 | Mount Kilimanjaro | Africa |
| 15 July 2014 | Mont Blanc | Europe |
| 5 February 2014 | Mount Kosciuszko | Australia |

== Achievements ==
1. Climbed Mount Everest – at the age of 60 years 6 months.
2. Climbed Mount Vinson – at the age of 60.
3. Climbed Hanuman Tibba – at the age 59.
4. Climbed Aconcagua, the highest peak of South America. at the age of 58.
5. Climbed Highest peak of Russia at the age of 59.
6. First eldest couple of India to complete the Assistant challenge with Koziosco peak in Australia. For this achievement recognized by Limca's book of records.
7. Mt. Mera, Mt. Lobuche from Nepal.
8. Completed two full marathons (42.7 km) and 18 half marathons.
9. Completed Gorichen at the age of 61 with associated NIMAS.

== Wife's death ==
In 2019, he lost his wife Anjali while climbing Mt. Everest under the Hillary Step, where he was forced to leave her body until it was retrieved days later.

== Everest summit ==
On 22 May 2019, Sharad climbed Mount Everest, aged 60 years and 6 months, becoming the oldest Indian to reach the summit.
