= Mehao Wildlife Sanctuary =

- IUCN category II (national park)
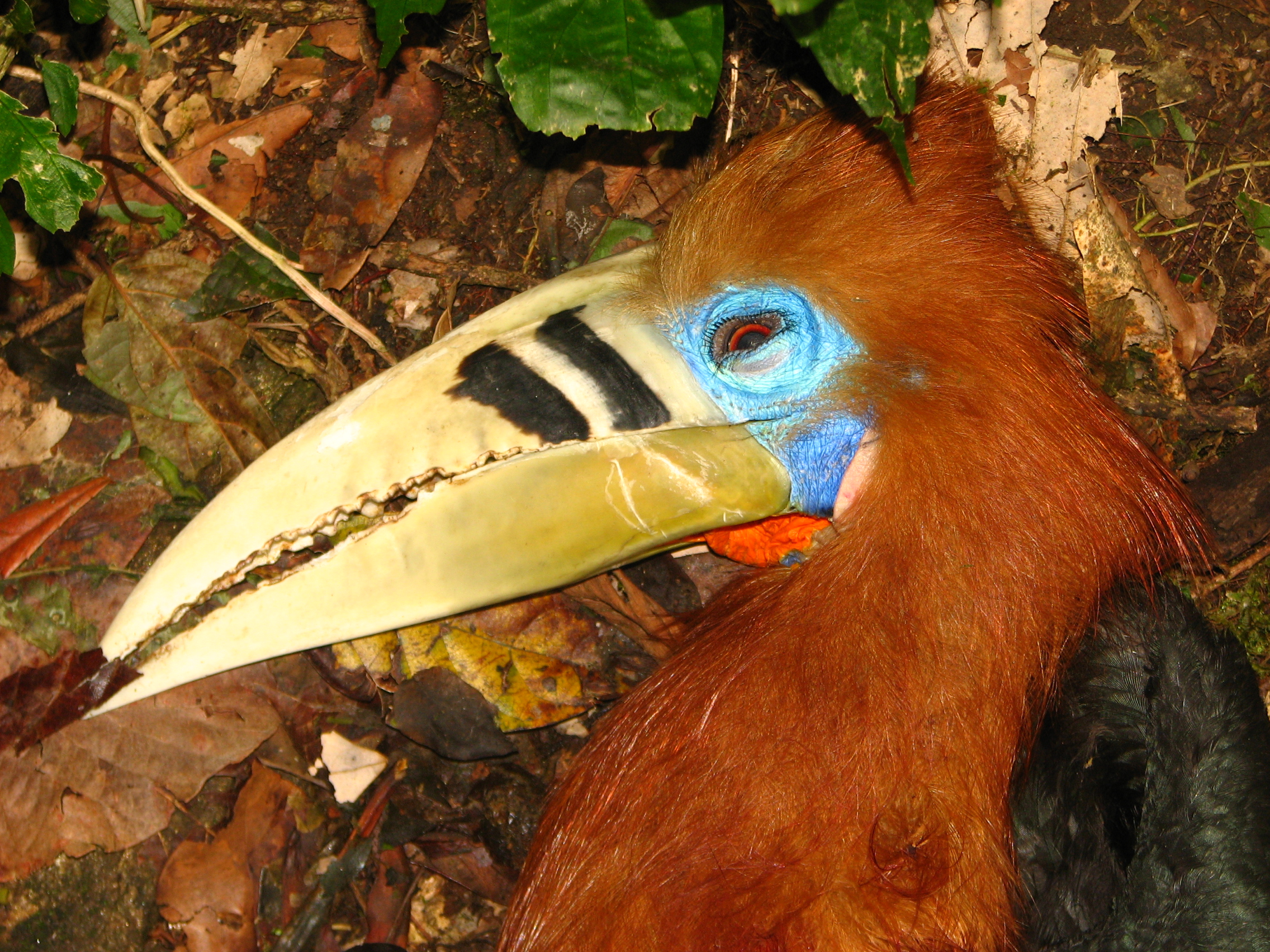
- Hunting Rufous-necked Hornbill (Aceros nipalensis) at Mehao Wildlife Sanctuary on February 24, 2008

- Location within Arunachal Pradesh Location within India
- Interactive map of Mehao Wildlife Sanctuary
- Coordinates: 28°09′27″N 95°56′24″E
- Area: 281.5 km^{2} (108.7 sq mi)
- Established: 1980
- Website: Secretary (Environment & Forest), Government of Arunachal Pradesh

The Mehao wildlife sanctuary was declared with an aim to conserve the biodiversity around the Mehao Lake. The sanctuary is gifted with virgin natural lush green forest and lakes. The sanctuary harbours some rare varieties of orchids. The altitude of the sanctuary varies from 900 to 3500 meters. The sanctuary covers 281.5 km^{2} (108.7 sq mi). Its average winter temperature is 12 °C (54 °F) and its average summer temperature is 36 °C (97 °F).

== Flora ==
The forest can be classified into four major types; tropical evergreen, sub-tropical and temperate forest, temperate broad leaved forest and temperate coniferous forest. Plant species found in the sanctuary include Coptis teeta Taxus baccata, Terminalia myriocarpa, Terminalia bellirica, Terminalia chebula, Altingia excelsa, Jalauma phellocarpa, Abizzia lucida, Abizzia procera, Abizzia arunachalensis, Abizzia sherriffi, Acacia caesia, Canarium strictum, Lagerstroemia speciosa, Duabanga grandiflora, Michelia champaca, Messua ferra, Dillenia indica, Castanopsis indica, Bischofia javanica, Magnolia species, Ailanthus grandis, Kydia calycina, Bombax ceiba, Schima wallichii, Ficus altissima, Ainus nepalensis, Populus amblei, Castanopsis indica, Castanopsis spicata, Quercus griffithi, Quercus amellosa, and Betula alnoides.

== Fauna ==
The Mehao Sanctuary is rich in biodiversity. The animals found in the sanctuary include tiger, leopard, clouded leopard, Asian elephant, gaur, sloth bear, barking deer, marbled cat, capped langur, slender loris, white browed gibbon, musk deer, Mishmi takin, red panda, and serow. The king cobra, python and great whip snake are the rare species of reptile found here. Butterflies include common peacock and Paris peacock.

== Funga ==
The sanctuary harbours a rich lichen diversity, with 177 species belonging to 71 genera and 35 families identified across its altitudinal range (400–2700 m). Crustose lichens form the dominant growth type, comprising 56.5% of documented species, followed by foliose (34.5%) and fruticose (8%) forms. Only one species, Lecanora perplexa, was found across all study sites. The mid-altitude range of 1400–1600 m showed peak lichen diversity, displaying a unimodal pattern in relation to altitude. The central zone around Mehao Lake supported more lichen species compared to peripheral areas, likely due to reduced human disturbance and favourable microclimatic conditions created by the lake. The sanctuary's lichen diversity represents 8.6% of India's known lichen funga, making it one of the richest protected areas studied for lichens in the country. Humidity and altitude were identified as key factors influencing lichen distribution and diversity patterns within the sanctuary.

== Location ==
The sanctuary is 17 km from Roing town which is also the district headquarters. The best time to visit the sanctuary is from October to March.

Map of Mehao WL Sanctuary
