= List of State Protected Monuments in Arunachal Pradesh =

This is a list of State Protected Monuments as officially reported by and available through the website of the Archaeological Survey of India in the Indian state Arunachal Pradesh. The monument identifier is a combination of the abbreviation of the subdivision of the list (state, ASI circle) and the numbering as published on the website of the ASI. 7 State Protected Monuments have been recognized by the ASI in Arunachal Pradesh. Besides the State Protected Monuments, the Monuments of National Importance in this state might also be relevant.

== List of state protected Monuments ==
SL. No.	Description	Location	Address	District	Coordinates	Image
S-AR-1	Vijaynagar	Changlang		Changlang		Upload Photo
S-AR-2	Naksaparbat	East Kameng		East Kameng		Upload Photo
S-AR-3	Ruins of Copper temple	Lohit		Lohit		Upload Photo
S-AR-4	Ruins of Copper temple	Papum Pare		Papum Pare		Upload Photo
S-AR-5	Ruins of Copper temple	West Kameng		West Kameng		Upload Photo
S-AR-6	Ruins of Copper temple	West Kameng		West Kameng		Upload Photo
S-AR-7	Ruins of Copper temple	West Siang		West Siang		Upload Photo

== See also ==
- List of Monuments of National Importance in Arunachal Pradesh
- List of State Protected Monuments in India
