= Kepang La =

- Gēngbā Lā
- Location within Arunachal Pradesh Location within Tibet
- Elevation: 1,455 metres (4,774 ft)

Third Approach
- Location: India (Arunachal Pradesh) – China (Tibet)
- Coordinates: 29.1531°N 94.9781°E

Kepang La or Gēngbā Lā (Chinese: 更巴拉山口; pinyin: gēngbā lā shānkǒu) is a mountain pass on the Indo-Tibetan Line of Actual Control near the course of the Yarlung Tsangpo (Brahmaputra or Siang) river. It separates the Mêdog County of Tibet from the Upper Siang district of India's Arunachal Pradesh.

On the Indian side, the pass is 4 kilometers away from the Gelling village in the Tuting circle. On the Chinese side, it is located at a distance of 6 kilometers from the Xirang village (西让村) under the Beibeng Township. Before the 1962 war, the pass was used for barter trade between the local communities on both the sides of the border. In 1962 the pass was used by People's Liberation Army troops to cross into the Indian-administered territory.

In August 2018, Kepang La was designated as a prospective border personnel meeting (BPM) point.
