= Ranganadi River =

River in India

Ranganadi River Paniyor River
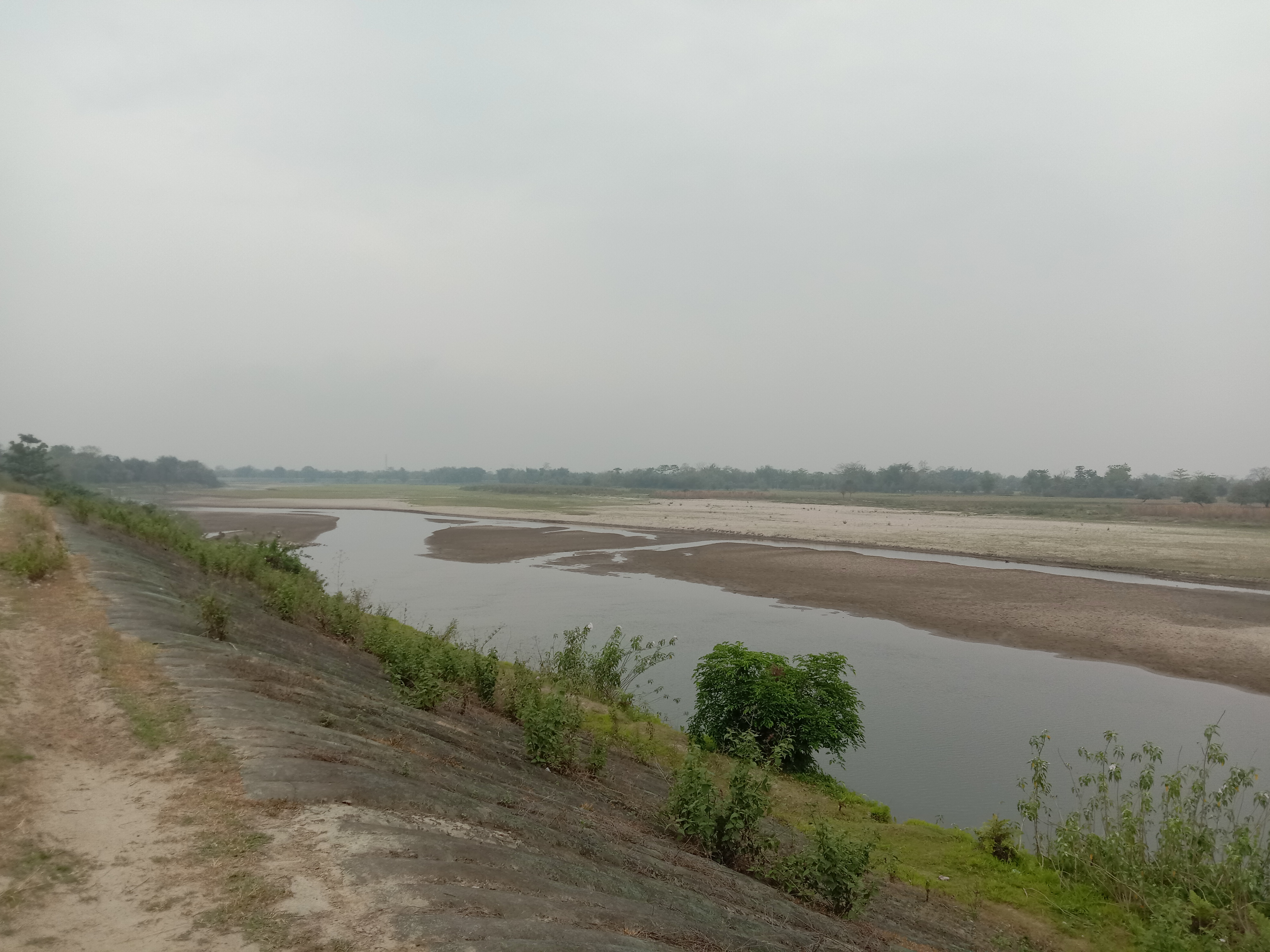
- Ranganadi River in Lakhimpur district

- Location within Assam Location within India
- Native name: ৰঙানদী (Assamese)

Location
- State: Arunachal Pradesh & Assam
- District: Lakhimpur District

Physical characteristics
- Source: Nilam, Marta and Tapo mountain ranges of Himalayan foothills
  - location: Arunachal Pradesh
  - coordinates: 27°25′48.7″N 93°43′31.3″E
- Mouth: Subansiri River
  - location: Pokoniaghat, Lakhimpur district, Assam
  - coordinates: 27°01′27.72″N 94°03′05″E

Basin features
- Progression: Ranganadi River - Subansiri River- Brahmaputra River

The Ranganadi River (also known as Paniyor River) is a sub-tributary of the Brahmaputra River in the Indian state of Assam. The river originates from Nilam, Marta and Tapo mountain ranges of Himalayan foothills of Arunachal Pradesh. The Ranganadi river then enters Assam at Johing of Lakhimpur district and flows 60 km through Lakhimpur district before its confluence with the Subansiri River at Pokoniaghat of Lakhimpur district.

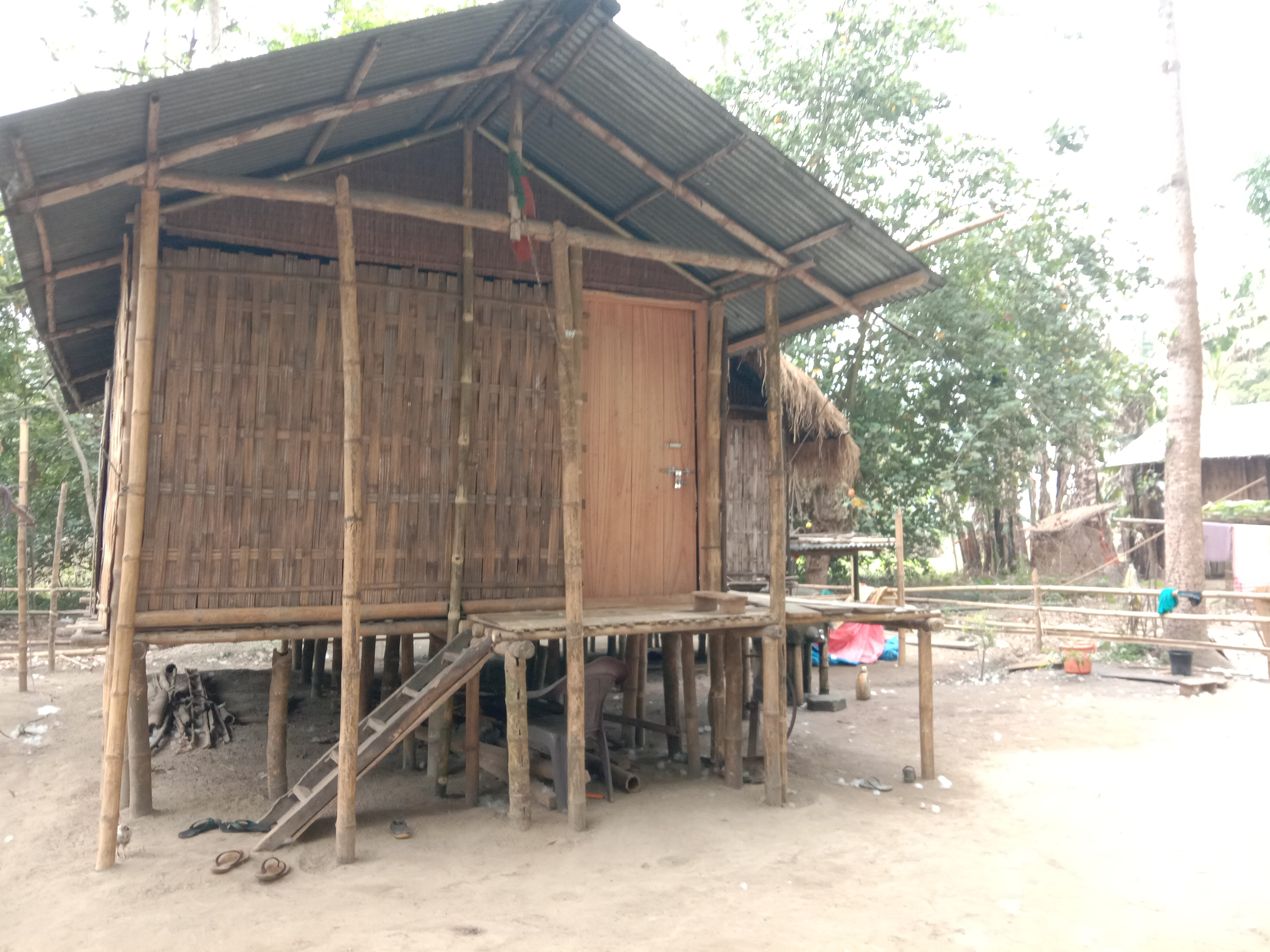
House (Chang Ghar) of Mising people on the bank of Ranganadi River in Lakhimpur district

A herd of domestic water buffaloes taking bath in the Ranganadi River in Lakhimpur district

== Ranganadi Dam ==
The Ranganadi Dam is a concrete-gravity diversion dam on the Ranganadi River located at Lower Subansiri district of Arunachal Pradesh.
