= Mouling National Park =

National park in Arunachal Pradesh, India

- IUCN category II (national park)
- Location within Arunachal Pradesh Location within India
- Interactive map of Mouling National Park
- Location: Upper Siang, Arunachal Pradesh; West Siang, Arunachal Pradesh; East Siang, Arunachal Pradesh
- Coordinates: 28°35′N 94°52′E
- Area: 483 km^{2} (186 sq mi)
- Established: 30 December 1986
- Governing body: Department of Environment and Forest of Arunachal Pradesh

Mouling National Park is a national park located in the Indian state of Arunachal Pradesh, spread primarily over the Upper Siang district and parts of the West Siang and East Siang district. It was the second national park to be created in the state, after Namdapha National Park in 1972. The Mouling National Park and the Dibang Wildlife Sanctuary are located fully or partly within Dihang-Dibang Biosphere Reserve.

== Name ==
The park is named after the nearby Mouling peak. Mouling is an Adi word which means red poison or red blood, which is believed to be red latex from a tree species found locally. The area is thought to have a large number of poisonous snakes, but this cannot be verified as the ecology of the area has been sparsely explored.

Moulíng means (among = soil/land and yalíng = red), from among (mo) yalíng (líng). Therefore, moulíng should be read as red soil.

== Geography ==
The national park covers an area of about 483 km^{2} forming the western part of the Dihang-Dibang Biosphere Reserve. The terrain is rugged with an altitudinal range of 750 to 3064 m at the highest point, the Mouling Peak. The Siyom River flows along the western fringes of the park and several small rivers such as the Siring, Krobong, Semong and Subong drain into the Siang river near the eastern boundary of the park.

The park is under the administrative control of the Divisional Forest Office located in Jengging and the nearest major towns are Along and Pasighat, 130 km and 185 km from the park. Approach to the park is not possible via roads, due to the remoteness of the area and communication facilities in the area are poor. The nearest airfield is located in Along. The Forest Department's managerial control is limited by the lack of road communication and all the divisional/range/beat offices are located well outside the park. The park boundaries have been drawn through an aerial survey based on artificial and natural boundaries such as the Siyom River in the west, and on-ground demarcation of sections of the boundary is still not complete. The park has two ranges; the Ramsing range accessible from the Bomdo village and the Jengging range accessible from the Lissing village.

The area is extremely humid, with heavy rainfall (2343 mm annually) and no well-defined dry season. In low altitude temperature ranges between 15 °C to 38 °C, Winter snowfall is experienced in higher altitudes. Temperature varies from 4.2 °C to 17.7 °C at altitudes ranging from 2,200 m onwards.

== Biology and ecology ==
The area around Mouling National park is one of great bio-diversity, with a juxtaposition of different biotopes, and is often called the state's cradle of biodiversity. With elevations ranging from 400 m to over 3000 m in the park, it forms a transition zone between tropical forests at lower altitudes to most temperate forest at altitudes above 2800 m.

The overall inaccessibility due to poor or no roads and stories associated with the forest itself have kept the core area of the national park relatively untouched by human activities. There has been evidence of past practices of jhum cultivation, especially in the Northern and South-eastern areas of the park. Animals such as the takin, goral, Indian leopard, Bengal tiger, barking deer, serow and red panda are living there.
