= List of Monuments of National Importance in Arunachal Pradesh =

This is a list of Monuments of National Importance as officially recognized by and available through the website of the Archaeological Survey of India in the Indian state of Arunachal Pradesh. The monument identifier is a combination of the abbreviation of the subdivision of the list (state, ASI circle) and the numbering as published on the website of the ASI. 3 Monuments of National Importance have been recognized by the ASI in Arunachal Pradesh.

== List of monuments of national importance ==
SL. No.	Description	Location	Address	District	Coordinates	Image
N-AR-1	Tamreswari (Kechai-Khati) Temple near Sadiya, Lohit	Near Sadia		Lohit		Upload Photo
N-AR-2	Ruins, Bhalukpong	Bhalukpong (Balipara)		West Kameng	27°00′45″N 92°38′20″E	Ruins, Bhalukpong More images
N-AR-3	Remains in Bhismak Nagar	Lower Dibang Valley		Lower Dibang Valley	28°02′54″N 96°00′16″E	Remains in Bhismak Nagar More images

== See also ==
- List of Monuments of National Importance in India for other Monuments of National Importance in India
- List of State Protected Monuments in Arunachal Pradesh
