= Dihang-Dibang Biosphere Reserve =

- Biosphere Reserve
- Location in Arunachal Pradesh, India Dihang-Dibang Biosphere Reserve (India)
- Coordinates: 27°59′N 94°30′E
- Country: India
- State: Arunachal Pradesh
- District: Upper Siang, West Siang & Dibang Valley

Area
  - Total: 5,112 km^{2} (1,974 sq mi)

Languages
  - Official: English
- Time zone: UTC+5:30 (IST)
- Vehicle registration: AR
- Nearest city: Anini
- Governing body: Government of Arunachal Pradesh

Dihang-Dibang or Dehang-Debang is a biosphere reserve constituted in 1998. It is in the Indian state of Arunachal Pradesh. The Mouling National Park and the Dibang Wildlife Sanctuary are located fully or partly within this biosphere reserve. The reserve spreads over three districts: Dibang Valley, Upper Siang, and West Siang. It covers high mountains of Eastern Himalaya and Mishmi Hills. The elevation in the reserve ranges up to more than 5,000 metres (16,000 ft) above sea level. An important fact relating to this Biosphere reserve is that it has natural vegetation stretching in an unbroken sequence from the tropics to mountain tundra. The type of vegetation are found in this biosphere reserve can be grouped as 1. Sub-tropical broad leafed forests, 2. Sub tropical pine forest, 3. Temperate broad leafed forests, 4. Temperate conifer, 5. Sub-alpine woody shrub, 6. Alpine meadow( mountain Tundra), 7. Bamboo brakes, 8. Grassland. The habitat in Dihang-Dibang ranges from tropical wet evergreen in the river gorges to subtropical, temperate, alpine and permanent snow.

The reserve is rich in wildlife. Rare mammals such as Mishmi takin, red goral, musk deer (at least two sub-species), red panda, Asiatic black bear, occasional tiger and Gongshan muntjac occur, while among birds there are the rare Sclater's monal and Blyth's tragopan. Two flying squirrels have been discovered from the vicinity of this reserve. These are named as Mechuka giant flying squirrel (Petaurista mechukaensis) and Mishmi Hills giant flying squirrel (Petaurista mishmiensis).

== See also ==
- Indian Council of Forestry Research and Education
