= Politics of Arunachal Pradesh =

Politics of an Indian state

On 20 February 1987, Arunachal Pradesh became a full-fledged state of India.

The key political players in Arunachal Pradesh state in north-east India are the ruling Bharatiya Janata Party, Indian National Congress, Janata Dal (United) ,People's Party of Arunachal and Nationalist Congress Party.

== National politics ==
There are only two Lok Sabha (lower house of the Indian Parliament) constituencies in Arunachal Pradesh.

== State politics ==
The Arunachal Pradesh Legislative Assembly has 60 seats directly elected from single-seat constituencies.

== Political parties ==
Major National Parties

- Bharatiya Janata Party (BJP) Found in 1980
- Indian National Congress (INC) Found in 1885
- National People's Party (NPP)

Regional Parties

- Janata Dal (United) (JDU)
- Janata Dal (Secular) (JDS)
- People's Party of Arunachal (PPA)
- Nationalist Congress Party (NCP)
- All India Trinamool Congress (AITC)

=== Defunct Political Parties ===
- Arunachal Congress (AC) {merged with Congress}
- Arunachal Congress (Mithi) (AC(M)) {merged with Congress}
- Congress (Dolo) {merged with BJP}

== See also ==
- Arunachal Pradesh Legislative Assembly
