= Siyom River =

River in Arunachal Pradesh, India

Coordinates: 28°14′06″N 94°59′57″E

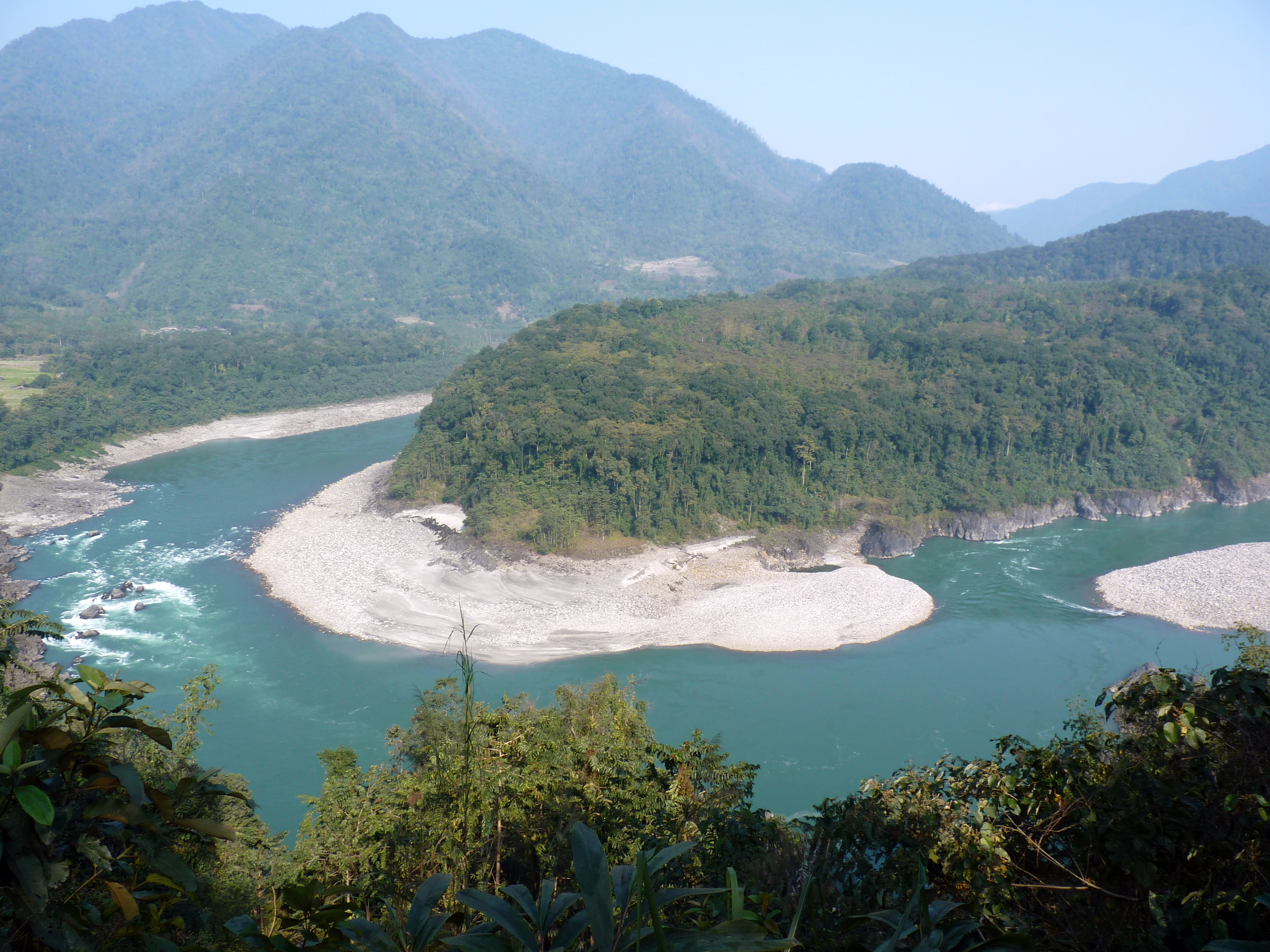
Siyom River near Aalo

The Siyom River is a right bank tributary of the Brahmaputra (Dihang or Siang) in the Indian state of Arunachal Pradesh.

The Siyom rises on the south of the main ridge of the Assam Himalaya not far from the border with Tibet. The Siyom initially flows in a southerly direction, later in an easterly and southerly direction through the West Siang District. The Saje River is the most prominent of its several tributaries. The Mouling National Park is located on the east bank of the river. The river passes the district capital Aalo and finally flows into the Brahmaputra 50 km above Pasighat. The Siyom has a length of about 170 km. The catchment area of the Siyom borders in the east, north and northwest on that of the Yarlung Tsangpo and in the southwest on that of the Subansiri River.
