= Gori Chen =

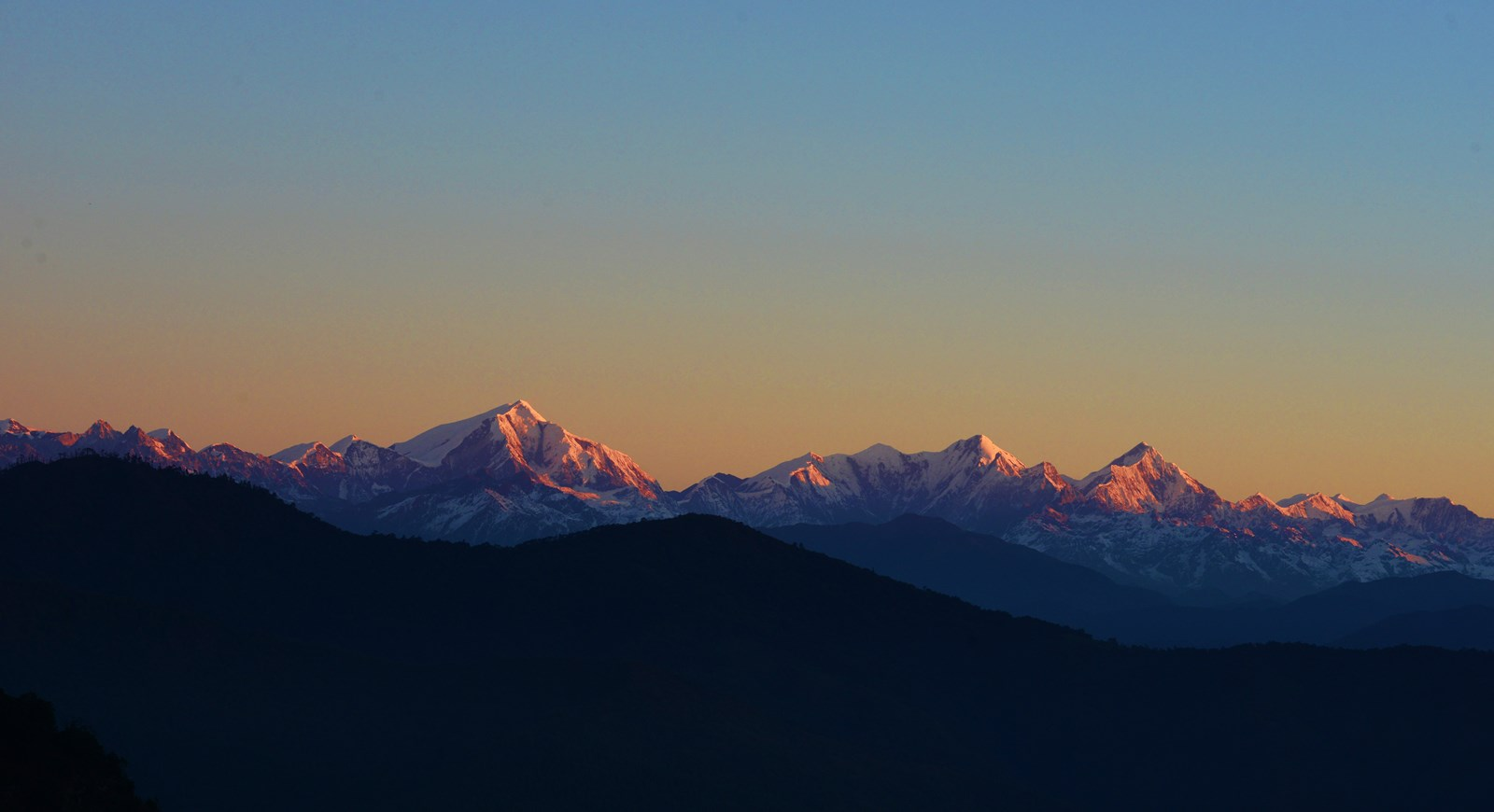
- Gori Chen mountains as seen at sunrise from Mandala, Arunachal Pradesh.

Highest point
- Elevation: 21,410 ft (6,530 m)
- Coordinates: 27.7951496°N 92.3877074°E

Naming
- Native name: Sa-Nga-Phu

Geography
- Location within Arunachal Pradesh Location within India

Climbing
- Easiest route: No established summit route

Gori Chen is a glacier-fed mountain group in the Eastern Himalayas. Peaks include the third highest peak in northeast India. Other peaks include Gorichen II (21,287 feet (6,488 m)), Gorichen East (20,413 feet (6,222 m)) and Gorichen South (20,496 feet (6,247 m)).

It is among the mountains of India that is popular for expeditions and trekkers. Gori Chen provided for training to the 19 Kumaon before its deployment in Siachen in the 1980s. Older expeditions passing Gori Chen include the Bailey–Morshead exploration in 1913 and Bill Tilman's expedition in 1939. The Bailey–Morshead exploration in 1913 has inspired a modern Bailey Trail. Gorichen Main (6488 Mtr.) peak climbed by the members of Mountaineers' Association of Krishnanagar, West Bengal on 21st October, 2024 under the leadership of Tenzing Norgay Awardee veteran mountaineer Shri Basanta Singha Roy. Climbing members are Shri Basanta Singha Roy (64 years age), Ms. Rumpa Das, Shri Prasanta Singha, Shri Subrata Ghosh and Shri Partha Sarathi Layak all are MAK members. This team is the first civilian team of India who climbed Mt. Gorichen of Arunachal Pradesh.

== Maps ==
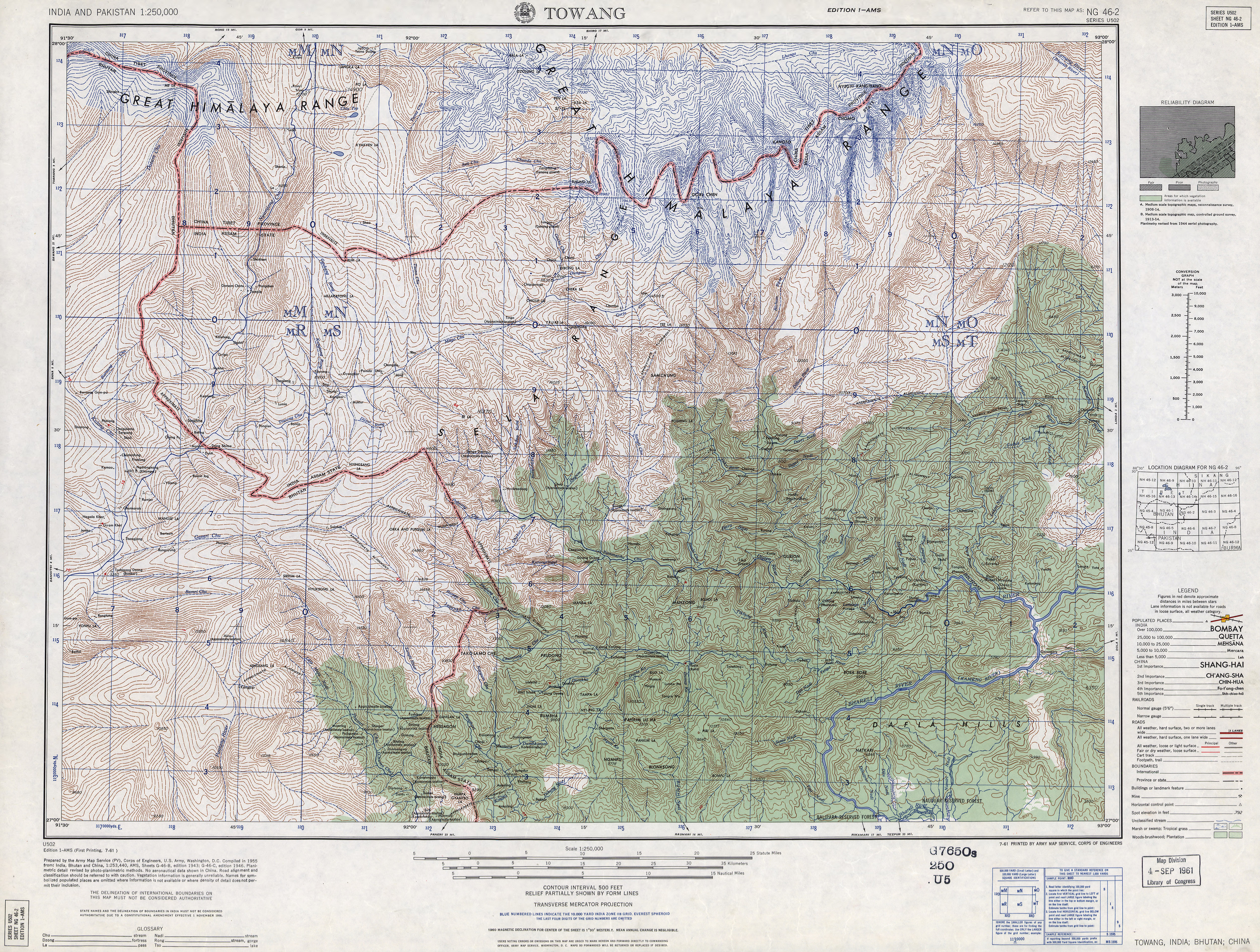
Gori Chen. U.S. Army Map Service, 1955

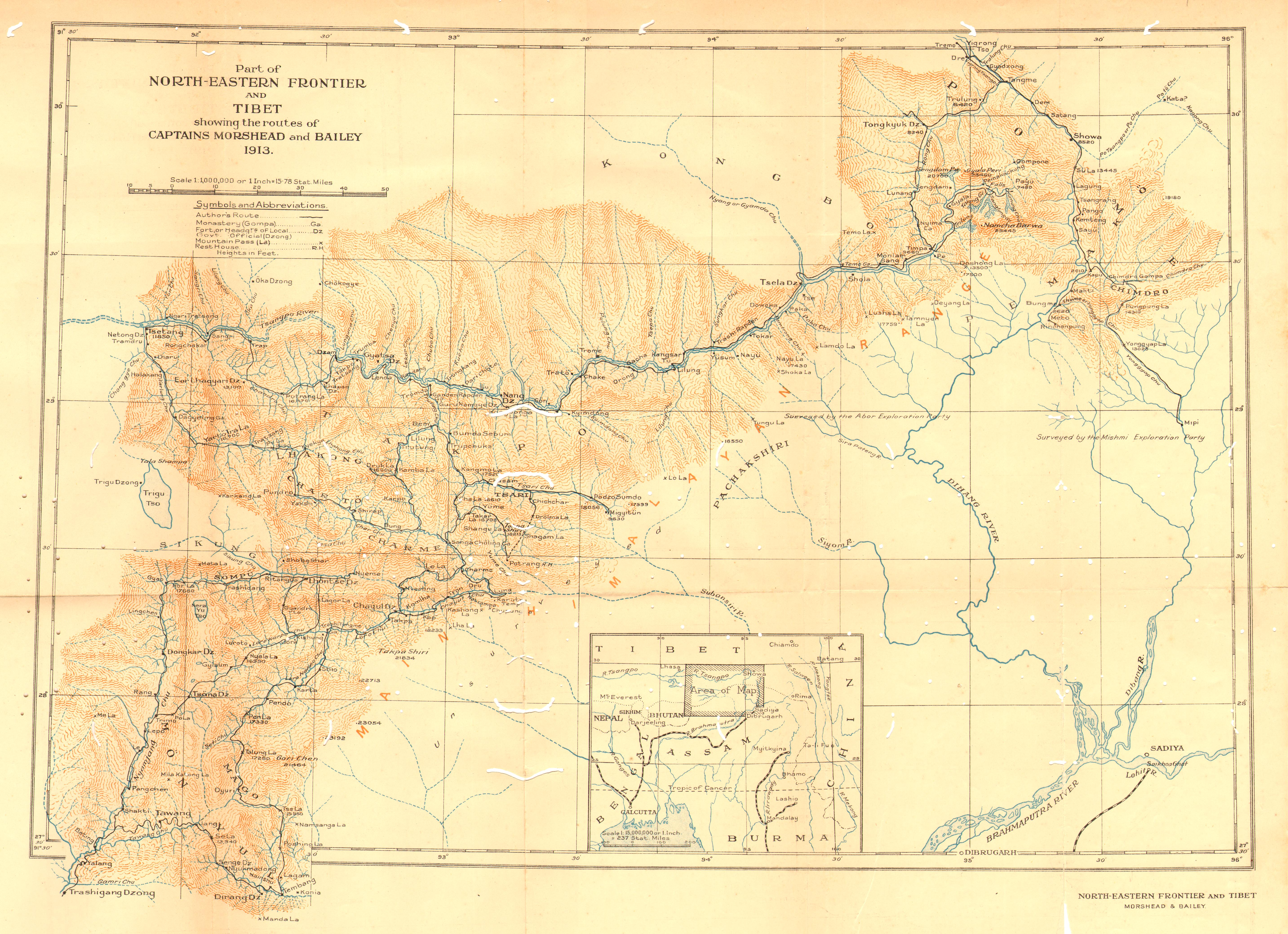
Gori Chen 21464. Bailey–Morshead exploration of North-East Frontier of India and eastern Tibet in 1913
