= Talle Valley Wildlife Sanctuary =

Protected area in Arunachal Pradesh, India

- IUCN category IV (habitat/species management area)
- Location within Arunachal Pradesh Location within India
- Interactive map of Talle Valley Wildlife Sanctuary
- Location: Arunachal Pradesh, India
- Coordinates: 27.547681°N 93.897555°E
- Area: 337 km^{2} (130 sq mi)
- Established: 1995

Talle Valley Wildlife Sanctuary is a protected area in Arunachal Pradesh, India, with an area of 337 km^{2} (130 sq mi). It was established in 1995. It is also known as Talley Valley Wildlife Sanctuary. It ranges in elevation from 1,200 to 3,000 m (3,900 to 9,800 ft) and harbours subtropical and temperate broadleaved and conifer forests. Mammal species present include clouded leopard (Neofelis nebulosa), Malayan giant squirrel (Ratufa bicolor), northern red muntjac (Muntiacus vaginalis) and Asian palm civet (Paradoxurus hermaphroditus). The 130 bird species observed in spring 2015 included black eagle (Ictinaetus malayensis), collared owlet (Glaucidium brodiei), golden-breasted fulvetta (Lioparus chrysotis), scarlet minivet (Pericrocotus speciosus), Verditer flycatcher (Eumyias thalassinus) and Mrs. Gould's sunbird (Aethopyga gouldiae).

== Flora ==
There are about 16 endangered plants that have survived in this area, they are: Panax sikkimensis, Schizandre, Acer hookeri, Acer oblongum, Goleola neediflora, Angioteris evecta, Cyathia spinulosa, Monotropa uniflora, Clematis apiculata, Corybus spp., Goleola falconeri, Balanphora dioica, Lilium grandiflora, Pleioblastu simonii, Berberis spp., Cotoneaster species.
