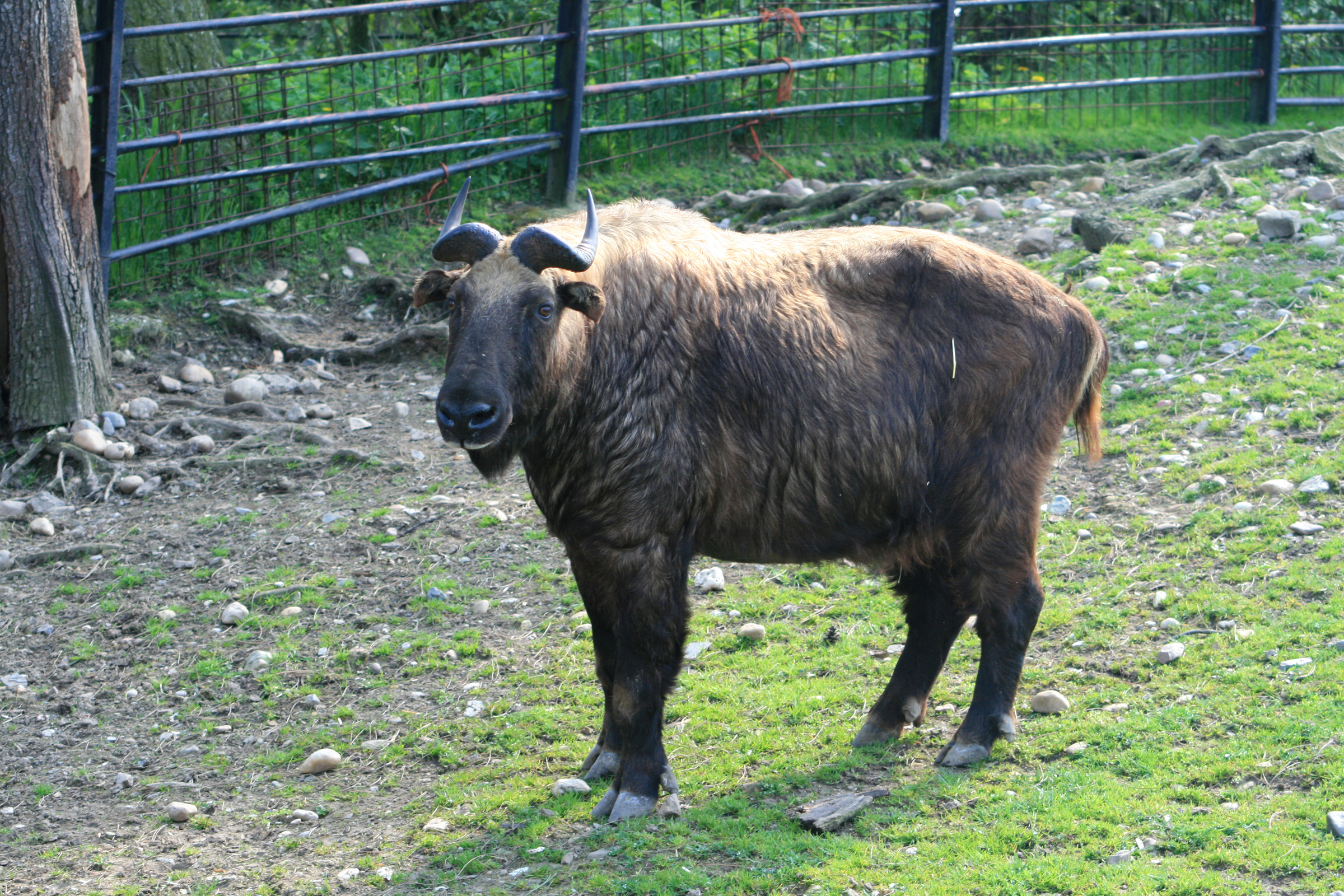
- Mishmi takin from Prague Zoo

Conservation status
- Endangered (IUCN 3.1)

Scientific classification
- Kingdom: Animalia
- Phylum: Chordata
- Class: Mammalia
- Order: Artiodactyla
- Family: Bovidae
- Subfamily: Caprinae
- Genus: Budorcas
- Species: B. taxicolor
- Subspecies: B. t. taxicolor

Trinomial name
- Budorcas taxicolor taxicolor Hodgson, 1850

= Mishmi takin =

Animal found in the Himalayas

The Mishmi takin (Budorcas taxicolor taxicolor) is an endangered goat-antelope native to India, Myanmar and the People's Republic of China. It is a subspecies of takin.

The Mishmi takin lives in Northeast India and eats bamboo and willow shoots. It has an oily coat to protect it from the fog.

Several zoos and wildlife parks keep Mishmi takins in captivity, notably Kolmården Wildlife Park (Sweden), Beijing Zoo (China), Skærup Zoo (Denmark), Dibang Wildlife Sanctuary (Arunachal Pradesh, India), Padmaja Naidu Himalayan Zoological Park (Darjeeling, India), Tierpark Berlin (Germany), Rostov Zoo (Russia), Wrocław Zoo (Poland), Sofia Zoo (Bulgaria), Tallinn Zoo (Estonia), Helsinki Zoo (Finland), Port Lympne Wild Animal Park and Paignton Zoo (England), Highland Wildlife Park (Scotland), Nyíregyháza Zoo (Hungary), and Taman Safari (Indonesia).

== See also ==
- List of endangered and protected species of China
