= Tirap River =

River in India

Coordinates: 27°18′N 95°47′E

- Mouth of the Tirap Tirap River (India)

Location
- Country: India

Tirap is a river flowing in Arunachal Pradesh and Assam states of India. The river originates in the mountainous areas of Laju circle. The Tirap district gets its name from the river, from which flows into Changlang district and then into Assam. The mouth of this river is the Buri-Dihing river in Assam near Ledo.

The river supports rice cultivation for villages on the banks by providing water as well as alluvial soil. In 2018, Arunachal Times reported illegal sand mining in Changlang area. Locals reported these activities; post which administrative issued notice.

Its minimum depth is 16 m and maximum depth is 32 m.
