= Dibang Wildlife Sanctuary =

Wildlife sanctuary in India

Dibang Wildlife, India
- IUCN category IV (habitat/species management area)
- Official logo of Dibang Wildlife Sanctuary

- Location within Arunachal Pradesh Location within India
- Interactive map of Dibang Wildlife, India
- Location: Arunachal Pradesh, India
- Coordinates: 29.047°N 95.79°E
- Area: 4,149 km^{2} (1,602 sq mi)
- Established: 1992
- Governing body: Department of Environment and Forest of Arunachal Pradesh
- Website: web.archive.org/web/20110721160134/http://arunachalforests.gov.in/Dibang%20Wildlife%20Sanctuary.html

The Dibang Wildlife Sanctuary is one of the eight wildlife sanctuaries of Arunachal Pradesh, India.

== Location ==
It is located in the Upper Dibang Valley district covering an area of 4,149 km^{2} (1,602 sq mi). The sanctuary is rich in wildlife. Rare mammals such as Mishmi takin, red goral, musk deer (at least two species), red panda, Asiatic black bear, occasional tiger and Gongshan muntjac occur while among birds there are the rare Sclater's monal and Blyth's tragopan.

== Flora and fauna ==
A new species of a flying squirrel, has been recently discovered from the edge of this sanctuary. It has been named the Mishmi Hills giant flying squirrel (Petaurista mishmiensis). Dibang Wildlife Sanctuary is located fully or partly within Dihang-Dibang Biosphere Reserve

It is protected by the Arunachal Pradesh Department of Environment and Forests.
