= Lhunze =

Lhunze may refer to:

- Lhünzê County, county in Tibet
- Lhünzê Town, village in Tibet
