= Religion in Arunachal Pradesh =

Religious distribution of Indian state

Religion in Arunachal Pradesh (2011)
1. Christianity (30.3%)
2. Hinduism (29.0%)
3. Donyi-Polo (26.2%)
4. Buddhism (11.8%)
5. Islam (1.90%)
6. Other (0.84%)

Owing to its ethnic and cultural diversity, religion in Arunachal Pradesh has been a spot for the syncretism of different traditional religions. Much of the native Tani populations follow an indigenous belief which has been systematised under the banner "Donyi-Polo" (Sun-Moon) since the spread of Christianity in the region by Christian missionaries in the second half of the 20th century. The province is also home to a substantial Tibetan Buddhist population in the north and northwest who follow Tibetan Buddhism, of ethnic groups who subscribe to Hinduism, and other religious populations. Christianity is followed by over 30.26% of the population, mostly by natives.

== Statistics ==

Religious Statistics of Arunachal Pradesh
| Religion | 1971 | | 1981 | | 1991 | | 2001 | | 2011 | |
| Religion | Pop. | % | Pop. | % | Pop. | % | Pop. | % | Pop. | % |
|---|---|---|---|---|---|---|---|---|---|---|
| Buddhism | 61,400 | 13.13 | 86,483 | 13.69 | 111,372 | 12.88 | 143,028 | 13.03 | 162,815 | 11.77 |
| Christianity | 3,684 | 0.79 | 27,306 | 4.32 | 89,013 | 10.30 | 205,548 | 18.72 | 418,732 | 30.26 |
| Hinduism | 102,832 | 22.00 | 184,732 | 29.24 | 320,212 | 37.04 | 379,935 | 34.6 | 401,876 | 29.04 |
| Islam | 842 | 0.18 | 5,073 | 0.80 | 11,922 | 1.38 | 20,675 | 1.88 | 27,045 | 1.95 |
| Jainism | 39 | 0.01 | 42 | 0.01 | 64 | 0.01 | 216 | 0.02 | 771 | 0.06 |
| Sikhism | 1,255 | 0.27 | 1,231 | 0.19 | 1,205 | 0.14 | 1,865 | 0.17 | 3,287 | 0.24 |
| ORP | 296,674 | 63.46 | 326,000 | 51.6 | 313,118 | 36.22 | 337,399 | 30.73 | 362,553 | 26.2 |
| Not stated | 785 | 0.17 | 972 | 0.15 | 17,652 | 2.04 | 9,302 | 0.85 | 6,648 | 0.48 |
| Total | 467,511 | 100 | 631,839 | 100 | 864,558 | 100 | 1,097,968 | 100 | 1,383,727 | 100 |

== Christianity ==
Christianity one of the largest religious community in Arunachal Pradesh as per the 2011 Census of India census recorded 418,732 Christians, or 30.26 per cent of state's population, up from 205,548 (18.72 per cent) a decade earlier and from just 3,684 (0.79 per cent) in 1971. Roman Catholics and Baptists form the two largest denominations, organised respectively under the Catholic Dioceses of Itanagar and Miao and the Arunachal Baptist Church Council; smaller bodies include the Presbyterian Church linked to the Mizoram Synod, the Arunachal Pradesh Christian Revival Church Council and the United Pentecostal Church of North East India. The state belongs to the area of the Diocese of North East India of the Church of North India. The first recorded baptisms of Arunachali tribespeople date only to 1919–1920, with Sensu Nar among the Nyishi in the west and Dugyon Lego and Tamik Dabi among the Adi in the east. Christianity therefore spread less through foreign evangelists living locally than through tribal students educated in Catholic and Baptist schools across the border in Assam and Shillong, who returned home as the first preachers among their own peoples. Conversions climbed steeply from the late 1960s, after Taro Boje and Barjo Taye were appointed as the first licensed evangelists by the Council of Baptist Churches in North East India in 1966 and the Catholic Mission began work among the Apatani at Ziro in 1963; between 1966 and 1975 numerous associations were formed among the Adi, Galo, Nyishi and other groups, later federating into the Arunachal Baptist Church Council.

In a state with more than fifty Tibeto-Burman languages, many of them mutually unintelligible, Christian missions have played a significant part in giving indigenous tongues written form and in expanding tribal literacy. The earliest sustained codification of a Tani language is generally traced to Rev. William Robinson, who from 1841 worked to reduce the Miri (Mising) dialect to writing; missionaries Savide and Lorraine followed in 1902 with Isorke Doyinge and Jisuke Doyinge, collections of biblical narratives in Miri, succeeded by Keyum Kero (1914), a translation of Romans and Corinthians (1916) and a portion of the Bible (1917). The early Tani convert Dugyon Lego went on to adapt the Latin script for the tonal phonology of Tani languages, becoming one of Arunachal's first widely-known indigenous authors, while Kosham Lego and Okep Lego completed a Tani translation of the full New Testament in 1944. Comparable work by Baptist and Catholic publishers has since reduced languages such as Nyishi, Adi, Galo, Nocte and Wancho to writing, with scriptural translations often becoming the earliest printed literature in those tongues, a pattern documented across the wider Northeast. The Nokte New Testament, published in the late 2010s with support from the Bible Society of India, is described by community elders as a step toward preserving a language that had previously existed only in spoken form. Beyond language, the churches have continued to engage with material tribal culture wherein Catholic and Baptist parishes commonly encourage worshippers to attend Sunday services in traditional dress, masses and services are celebrated in both English and the local vernacular, and incoming clergy are expected to learn the language of the community they serve. Catholic and Baptist schools, which admit pupils irrespective of religion, are credited with literacy rates among Christians that exceed the state average, and Chief Minister Pema Khandu has publicly acknowledged the contribution of Christian missionaries to the growth of education in the state. The Salesians of Don Bosco, the Missionaries of Charity and other congregations operate schools, hostels and the first hospitals opened in the territory after independence.

== Donyi Poloism ==
Ever since the founding of the Donyi Polo religion by Daadi Botté Talom Rukbo, the indigenous religious movement has been heavily influenced by Hinduism. Donyi Poloism, along with other ancient religions, such as Hinduism, share a common belief on nature and the philosophy of maintaining the balance of nature. There was a fear among the followers in the early days of the movement that the religion would be incorporated into Hinduism as a result. This was refuted by Daadi Botté Talom Rukbo himself in a religious conference, where he established similarities between Donyi Polo and Bön, ancient Maya religion, Egyptian Ra Sun Worship, Tengri Worship & Japanese Shinto religion; and as such, all the world's ancient religions share a singular philosophy and are a part of a world community of nature worshippers and thus, asserted the need for a more independent approach. A prominent Donyi Polo place of worship in Aalo town is reminiscent of a Hindu temple. External influence upon the local indigenous religious traditions has been met with increasing severe opposition among the Tani intellectuals.

However a large number of the Donyi Polo followers still identify themselves as Hindu in the Census because the poll does not recognise the indigenous religion and thus, avoid selecting the "others" option.

== Buddhism ==
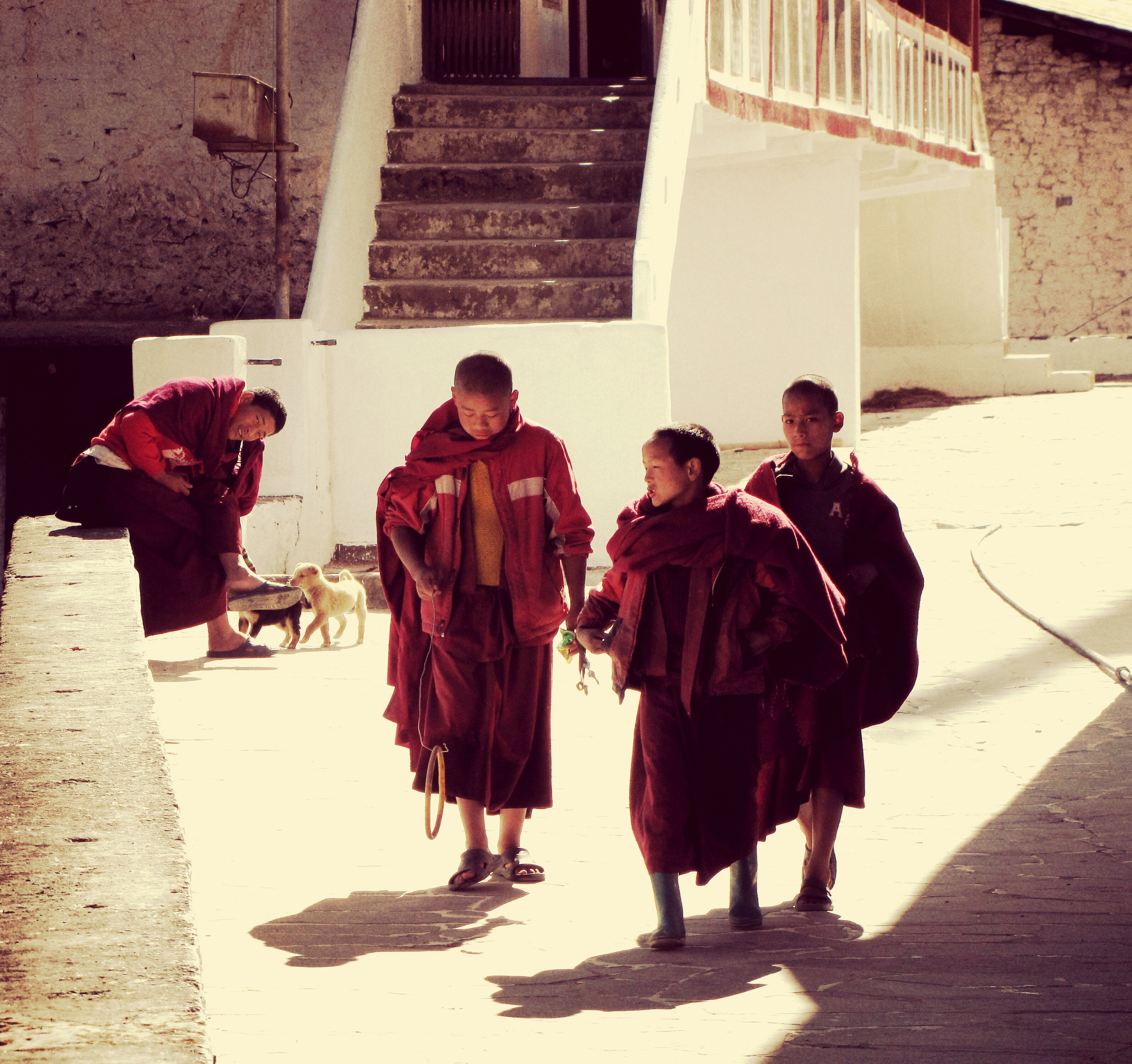
Tawang Monastery, founded in 1680–81 at the behest of the 5th Dalai Lama, is the largest monastery in India and the seat of Gelug Buddhism among the Monpas.

Buddhism (Tawang Monpa: སངས་རྒྱས་པ། Nang-pa, Khamti: ꩫꩣꩤ ꩪꩣꩬꩌꩣ Phra Dhamma, Chakma: 𑄝𑄪𑄘𑄳𑄙𑄧 𑄥𑄥𑄧𑄚𑄴 Buddha Sāsana) is a major religious tradition in the state, practised by approximately 11.8% of the state's population. Buddhism in the state is characterised by two distinct, historically unconnected traditions: Vajrayana (Tibetan Buddhism) in the high-altitude Himalayas, and Theravada Buddhism in the subtropical river valleys along borders with Assam and Myanmar.

Parts of what is now Western Arunachal Pradesh, used to be a part of Tibet in the historic Monyul region. At the 1914 Simla Convention the Monpa-inhabited regions of Tibet became a part of British India, although it de facto remained a part of Tibet until in February 1951 when Major Bob Khathing of the IAF, marched to Tawang, befriended the locals and annexed it into India. So in the west, the historically Buddhist districts of Tawang and West Kameng (together known as Monyul in Tibetan sources) are home to the Monpa, Sherdukpen and Memba communities, who practise the Gelug and Nyingma schools of Vajrayana Buddhism, layered onto an older Bon and animist substrate. As per local tradition holds that the saint Padmasambhava (Guru Rinpoche) meditated in a cave above Zemithang in the 8th century, a site now marked by the Taktsang Gompa, but the institutional spread of Buddhism into the Tawang plateau is more securely dated to the 17th century, when the Gelug school arrived from Tibet and absorbed the dominant Nyingma presence already established by the Tibetan master Urgyen Sangpo. Tawang Monastery, properly known as Galden Namgyal Lhatse, was founded by Merak Lama Lodre Gyatso in 1680–81 at the behest of the 5th Dalai Lama, and remains the largest Buddhist monastery in India and one of the largest in the Trans-Himalayan belt. Tawang is also remembered as the birthplace of the 6th Dalai Lama, Tsangyang Gyatso (1683–1706).

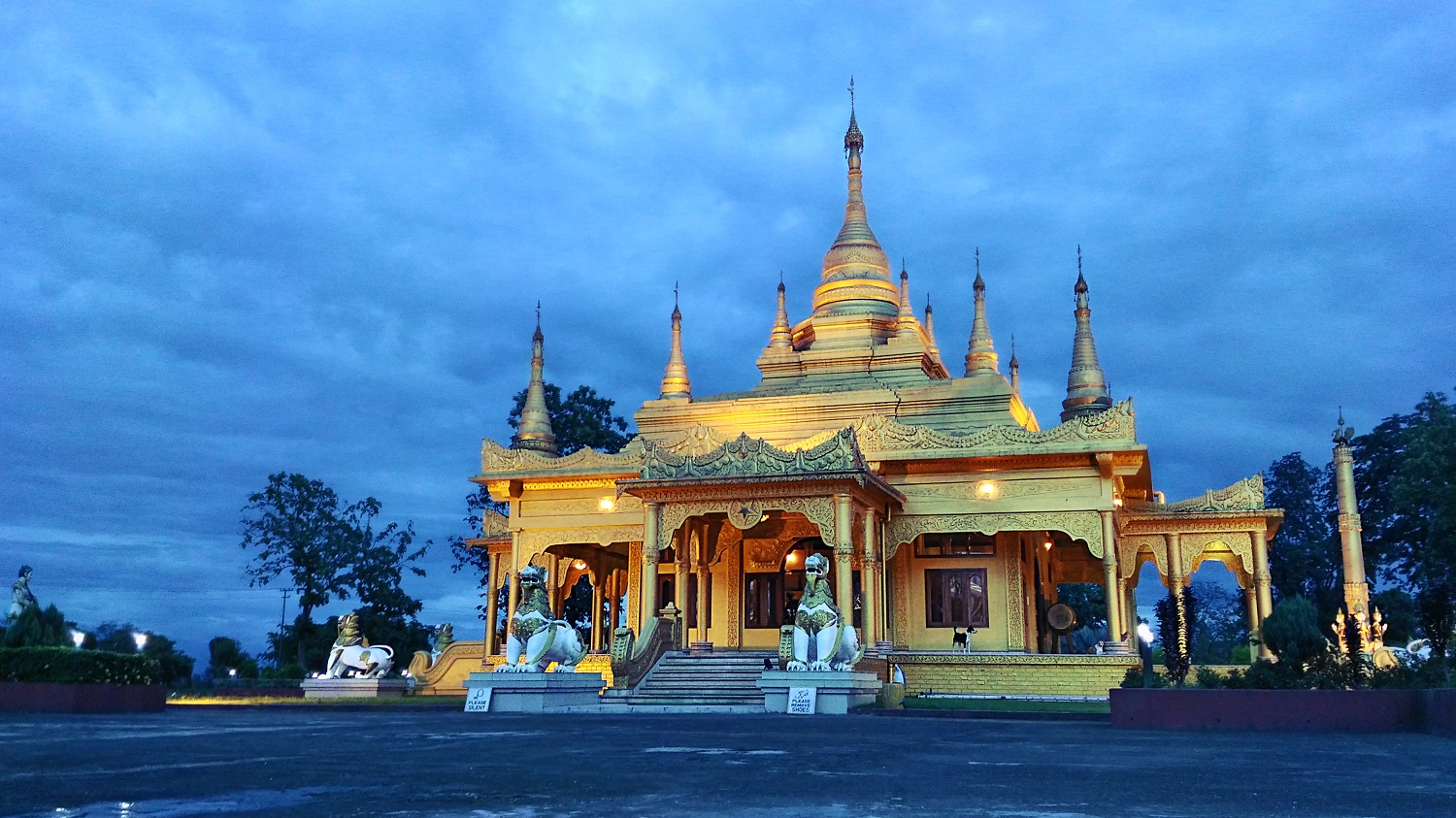
The Golden Pagoda (Kongmu Kham) at Namsai, opened in 2010, is the principal centre of Theravada Buddhism in Arunachal Pradesh.

The Theravada community in eastern Arunachal Pradesh is largely the product of Tai-speaking immigrants from upper Myanmar. The Tai Khamti reached the Tengapani and Lohit valleys from the Hkamti Long region in the 18th century, while the Singpho, related to the Jingpo (Kachin) of Myanmar, who had crossed the Patkai Hills during the tumultuous periods in Myanmar. Owing to influence from these communities there is also a smaller Theravada-practising groups such as the Tikhak Tangsa. The community's spiritual and architectural focus today is the Golden Pagoda, known locally as Kongmu Kham ("golden pagoda"), a Burmese-style temple complex consecrated in 2010 on a twenty-hectare site near Chongkham in Namsai district, which the state government markets as the "Abode of Theravada Buddhism". The main shrine holds a five-tonne bronze Buddha modelled on the Nalanda Kala Buddha and gifted by the Thai monastery of Wat Aranjikavas, and the World Tripiṭaka Foundation has designated the site as the first international Tripiṭaka centre in India. Festivals such as the Tawang Torgya and Losar in the west and Kathina and Sangken in the east continue to anchor public life in these regions, and the two traditions together give Arunachal Pradesh one of the most concentrated Buddhist presences of any Indian state outside Ladakh and Sikkim.

According to local folklore, the king of Muka Hu had seven daughters. The youngest was sent down the river, where a white tiger that was thought to be a god raised her. The grandmother of these three sons told them to go to a new land and find their own king. This led to the Khamsati settlement.

== Hinduism ==
Hinduism is the second largest religion in the Indian state of Arunachal Pradesh. According to the 2011 Census of India The recorded Hindu population is concentrated in the plains and foothill districts of the southeast bordering Assam, such as Lohit, Namsai, Anjaw and Lower Dibang Valley, and is comparatively small in the central and northern hill districts.

The single largest religious category recorded in Arunachal Pradesh in 2011 was not Hinduism but the "Other Religions and Persuasions" grouping, which captures the indigenous animist traditions of the state's tribes, principally Donyi-Polo and related faiths. Scholars treat these indigenous traditions as distinct from Hinduism. Because the census has no separate code for them, classification is imprecise and the boundary between the indigenous faiths and Hinduism is contested, a question complicated by the efforts of Hindu nationalist organisations to associate the two through the institutionalisation of tribal religion. Earlier censuses illustrate the instability of these categories: the recorded Hindu share rose from 22 per cent in 1971 to a peak of about 37 per cent in 1991 before falling to 29 per cent in 2011, while the "Other Religions" share fell over the same period and Christianity rose sharply.

== Animism ==
Animism is the underlying belief system of most of the indigenous communities of Arunachal Pradesh, predating the codified revival movements of the late twentieth century. Tani animism, shared by the Tani-speaking Adi, Apatani, Galo, Nyishi, Tagin and Mishing, centres on the veneration of Donyi (the Sun) and Polo (the Moon) and on a wider pantheon of nature spirits accessed through shamans known as nyibu or miri; it forms the substrate from which the institutionalised Donyi-Polo movement emerged from the late 1960s. Parallel non-Tani animist traditions persist among the Tangsa, whose reform movement is known as Rangfraism, among the Miju and Digaro Mishmi (Amik-Matai Ringya-Jawmalo) of Anjaw and Lohit, the Idu Mishmi of Dibang Valley (Intayaism), the Hruso (Nyezi-No), and among the Nocte, Wancho and other tribes of the Patkai region. The Indian census records these traditions collectively under the residual "Other Religions and Persuasions" category rather than as distinct faiths, a practice scholars have argued understates the adherent base of each tradition and complicates comparison across decades.

== Islam ==
Islam is the fifth most followed religion in Arunachal Pradesh. The 2011 Census of India recorded 27,045 Muslims, or 1.95 per cent of the state's population, up from 20,675 (1.88 per cent) a decade earlier and from just 842 (0.18 per cent) in 1971. The community is concentrated in the foothill towns and along the Assam border, particularly in and around Itanagar, Naharlagun, Pasighat and the Lohit and Namsai districts, rather than in the interior hill districts. It is composed mainly of settlers and traders rather than indigenous tribespeople.

The early history of Islam in the territory is poorly documented. No Muslim dynasty ever extended its administration into the Arunachal hills, and the faith reached the region indirectly, through the long Islamic presence in the Brahmaputra Valley dating to Malik Yuzbak's thirteenth-century campaign and the seventeenth-century mission of Azan Faqir in Assam, who is also credited with limited proselytisation in the present-day Naga Hills. A small Muslim presence in what is now Arunachal Pradesh likely predates these flows. In the late twentieth century the ruins of a mosque believed to date to the pre-colonial period were identified at Kimin, on the present Arunachal-Assam frontier, and have been cited as evidence of an early settlement linked to the Brahmaputra trade. The community grew chiefly through post-Partition and post-statehood migration of Assamese and Bengali Muslims into Arunachal's expanding administrative and market towns, alongside a much smaller number of tribal converts, most prominently among the Nyishi, drawn from communities that had earlier practised Donyi-Polo or Buddhism.

Conversion of indigenous tribal people to Islam, although numerically negligible, has been politically sensitive. Arunachal Pradesh's entry restrictions under the Bengal Eastern Frontier Regulation, 1873 are partly designed to insulate the state's scheduled tribes from outside settlement, and the same tribal-protection rhetoric used by indigenous-faith and Hindu nationalist organisations against Christian missionaries has been extended to Muslim converts. The All Arunachal Pradesh Tribal Muslim Youth Forum (AAPTMYF), formed in mid-2024 to represent tribal converts to Islam in the state, was forcefully dissolved at a press conference in Itanagar on 8 August 2024, after sustained islamophobic attacks and what its chairman described as threatening telephone calls to its executive members. Announcing the decision, chairman Giah Limpeah Sultan, a Nyishi convert whose father and grandfather had been Donyi-Polo priests, said the body was being wound up in deference to public sentiment, and that critics had wrongly assumed it would lobby on behalf of non-Arunachali tribal Muslims and undocumented Bangladeshi migrants. He defended individual freedom of religion and said he remained "first a Nyishi and a tribal". Opposition to the forum had been led by the Arunachal Indigenous Youth Force, which said it accepted personal conversion to Islam but rejected the creation of a religion-based body within tribal politics.

== See also ==
- Demographics of Arunachal Pradesh
- Golden Pagoda, Namsai
- Tawang Monastery
- Si-Donyi Festival
- Rangfrah, revivalist movement of Tangsa traditional spirituality
- Buddhism in Himachal Pradesh
