= Marriage in Galo culture =

The Galo People, a scheduled tribe in Arunachal Pradesh, India, have their own marriage traditions.

== Background ==
Arunachal Pradesh is in the northeast India, with an area of 83743 km^{2}. It is the largest state area-wise in the region, with 17 districts, 26 major tribes, and more than 100 sub-tribes. The Galo originate from the Abotani and are part of the Tani people, a group which also includes the Adi, Apatani, Nyishi, Tagin, and Mising. The Galo are one of the largest communities within the Tani people.

== History ==
In earlier days, the parents of a boy used to search a girl from a good family and they would meet the girl's parents with domesticated animal meat and express their marriage proposal. If the girl's parent accepted the proposal and as per the traditional and customary practices, the bridegroom's parents would bring cow and mithun meat, local wine and beads as first gifts and visit the bride's parents. Then the family members and elders of the community would discuss the bride price, given to the bride's family by the parents of the bridegroom. The bride price differs according to the status of the person, and primarily consists of the semi-domesticated mithun. The bridegroom's side must give at least two mithuns and two cows to the bride's parents. Those with more wealth could afford to give between 10 and 20 mithuns.

== Practices ==
The marriage practices depend on the situation and decision of both the parties. In many cases, the recognition of the girl as a wife is done by bringing the girl into the boy's parents home. Then in the presence of the family and community elders, the traditional practice called layap, a simple ceremony with the sacrifice of hen and a small feast. Traditional costly beads are given to the girl as a token of acceptance into the family of the boy and with a small feather of hen tied in girl's hair so that the community recognized her as married women now. From that day, the girl sleep with the boy and is recognized a legal wife. The newly wed will keep this for a month or long as per wish. The both boy and girl can stay together as married couple after all this traditions performed.

The main ceremony centers on the sacrifice of mithun (called togu panam or nyida), which can be done at a later time as is convenient for both parties. In some other case, the event occurs before the couple stay together as husband wife. Between five and 70 mithun might be sacrificed during this one-day ceremony by the boy's parents as an honor to both the families. The number of the mithun sacrificed depends on the capacity of the family. During the event, relatives, friends and leaders are invited. The bride's family bring costly beads and metals plates for the boy's family. In the evening of their arrival to the bridegroom's house, this exchange of gifts (costly metal plates and money in cash) is done after discussion. The bride's party also decides the number of mithun they are going to have and accordingly, they paid for the mithun price day before the sacrificed. Both the parties take their share and divide the mithun meat among the invited guests related to the bridegroom's family, friends and village community.

Celebratory performances, including songs, dances, and folk stories, are given by the bridegroom's family and community. The bride's side give the performers some amount of money as a token of love or as gifts. Children and youth from both sides also participate. During the wedding ceremony, locally made wine (Galo: apong) is given free of cost to the guests. The ceremony lasts for three days, after which the bride's family, relatives, and guests will return home. The bride will stay in the bridegroom's home until some rituals are performed.

== Divorce ==
If a man wants to divorce his wife, he must pay some amount, though not fixed, to the woman. After a divorce, the woman will take with her the costly beads and metal plates given by her parents and relatives during the marriage ceremony as her share of movable property.
