= Lemmi =

- Location in Arunachal Pradesh
- Coordinates: 27.160°N 93.220°E
- District: Pakke-Kessang district
- State: Arunachal Pradesh
- Country: India

Languages
  - Prevalent: Nishi, Adi, Galo, Apatani, Hindi
- Time zone: UTC+05:30 (IST)
- Pincode(s): 790103

Lemmi is a towan that serves as the headquarters of the Pakke-Kessang district in the state of Arunachal Pradesh in India.
