= Gallong language =

Sino-Tibetan language spoken in India

Galo
- Native to: Arunachal Pradesh, India
- Native speakers: 29,000 (2011 census)
- Language family: Sino-Tibetan: Tani; Western Tani; Subansiri; Galo
- Dialects: ?Karka; ?Gensi; Taipodia; Zɨrdo; Lare; Pugo

Language codes
- ISO 639-3: adl
- Glottolog: galo1242
- ELP: Galo
- Gallong is classified as Vulnerable by the UNESCO Atlas of the World's Languages in Danger.

The Galo language is a Sino-Tibetan language of the Tani group, spoken by the Galo people. Its precise position within Tani is not yet certain, primarily because of its central location in the Tani area and the strong effects of intra-Tani contacts on the development of Tani languages. It is an endangered language according to the general definitions, but prospects for its survival are better than many similarly-placed languages in the world.

== Dialects ==
The major Galo dialects are Pugo, spoken around the district capital Aalo; Lare, spoken to the south of Aalo; and a dialect that can be called Kargu kardi, pertaining to the dialect spoken in the northwest near the Tagin area. There may be additional Galo dialects further north, which remains largely unresearched. There are numerous subdialects that often correspond to regional or clan groupings. Neighbouring languages include Assamese, Nepali, Bodo, Mising, Minyong, Hills Miri, Tagin, Nishi, Bori, Pailibo, Ramo and Bokar.

Post (2007:46) lists a provisional classification of Galo dialects.

- Galòo
  - Karkòo?
  - Gensìi?
  - Taíi(podia)
    - (branch)
    - Zɨrdóo
      - (branch)
      - Larèe, Puugóo

Post (2013) reclassified Karko as a variety of Bori.

== Grammar ==
Like most central and eastern Tani languages, Galo is largely synthetic and agglutinating. Two primary lexical tones are present – High and Low – which may reflect two Proto-Tani syllable tones; in modern Galo, the surface TBU (Tone-Bearing Unit) is the usually polysyllabic phonological word. A robust finite/non-finite asymmetry underlies Galo grammar, and clause chaining and nominalization are both rampant. No synchronic verb-serialization appears to exist, although what seems to have been proto-verb-serialization has developed into a very large and productive system of derivational suffixes to bound verbal roots.

Major (non-derived) lexical classes are noun, adjective and verb. Other grammatical features include postpositions, relator nouns, classifiers, an extremely large system of aspectual suffixes, and a rich set of constituent-final particles coding functions related to epistemological status (such as evidentiality), discourse/pragmatic status, modality, and other related functions. Case-marking is basically accusative; ergativity has not been found.

Galo has an estimated lexicon of 5,000–8,000 words, though this may vary across dialects and communities.

== Morphology ==
Galo is a language where the verbs are complex. This is called predicate-centric. They can have lots of parts added to them, which changes their meaning. Nouns, on the other hand, are pretty simple because they have less prefixes. Some Galo words are short, but they might be parts of longer words that are not used anymore. Some word parts (bound morphemes) can only be used with other parts (free morphemes), and some stick to words like little tags to change the meaning of the whole phrase (suffixes, affixes, infixes, clitics etc.).

== Education ==
Galo language is taught as third language in schools of areas dominated by Galo community.

== See also ==
- Nefamese
