= Pakke-Kessang Assembly constituency =

Constituency of the Arunachal Pradesh legislative assembly in India

Coordinates: 27.16°N 93.22°E

Pakke-Kasang
- Constituency No. 12 for the Arunachal Pradesh Legislative Assembly

Constituency details
- Country: India
- Region: Northeast India
- State: Arunachal Pradesh
- District: Pakke-Kessang
- Lok Sabha constituency: Arunachal West
- Established: 1990
- Total electors: 9,297
- Reservation: ST

Member of Legislative Assembly
- 11th Arunachal Pradesh Legislative Assembly
- Incumbent Biyuram Wahge
- Party: Bharatiya Janata Party

Pakke-Kessang is one of the 60 assembly constituencies of Arunachal Pradesh, a northeastern state of India. Pakke-Kessang is part of Arunachal East Lok Sabha constituency.

== Members of the Legislative Assembly ==
Year	Member	Party
1990	Dera Natung	Indian National Congress
1995	Dera Natung	Indian National Congress
1999	Dera Natung	Indian National Congress
2004	Techi Hemu	Bharatiya Janata Party
2009	Atum Welly	Indian National Congress
2014	Kameng Dolo	Indian National Congress
2017 By-election	Biyuram Wahge	Bharatiya Janata Party
2019	Biyuram Wahge	Bharatiya Janata Party
2024	Biyuram Wahge	Bharatiya Janata Party

== Election results ==
=== Assembly Election 2024 ===
2024 Arunachal Pradesh Legislative Assembly election : Pakke-Kessang
Party	Candidate	Votes	%	±%
BJP	Biyuram Wahge	3,933	47.48%	▼18.02
NCP	Techi Hemu	3,120	37.66%	New
LJP(RV)	Dongli Gollo	997	12.04%	New
INC	Gollo Yapung Tana	166	2.00%	▼31.19
NOTA	None of the Above	68	0.82%	▼0.49
Margin of victory		813	9.81%	▼22.48
Turnout		8,284	89.10%	▲2.41
Registered electors		9,297		▲17.15
BJP hold		Swing	▼18.02	

=== Assembly Election 2019 ===
2019 Arunachal Pradesh Legislative Assembly election : Pakke-Kessang
Party	Candidate	Votes	%	±%
BJP	Biyuram Wahge	4,506	65.49%	▲11.93
INC	Atum Welly	2,284	33.20%	▼13.24
NOTA	None of the Above	90	1.31%	▲0.51
Margin of victory		2,222	32.30%	▲25.18
Turnout		6,880	86.69%	▼3.38
Registered electors		7,936		▲6.27
BJP hold		Swing	▲11.93	

=== Assembly By-election 2017 ===
2017 Arunachal Pradesh Legislative Assembly by-election : Pakke-Kessang
Party	Candidate	Votes	%	±%
BJP	Biyuram Wahge	3,603	53.56%	New
INC	Kameng Dolo	3,124	46.44%	New
NOTA	None of the Above	54	0.80%	New
Margin of victory		479	7.12%	
Turnout		6,727	90.81%	▲90.08
Registered electors		7,468		▲7.67
BJP gain from INC		Swing		

=== Assembly Election 2014 ===
2014 Arunachal Pradesh Legislative Assembly election : Pakke-Kessang
Party	Candidate	Votes	%	±%
INC	Kameng Dolo	Unopposed		
Registered electors		6,936		▲7.94
INC hold		Swing		

=== Assembly Election 2009 ===
2009 Arunachal Pradesh Legislative Assembly election : Pakke-Kessang
Party	Candidate	Votes	%	±%
INC	Atum Welly	2,885	50.59%	▲9.23
NCP	Techi Hemu	2,818	49.41%	New
Margin of victory		67	1.17%	▼16.11
Turnout		5,703	88.75%	▲11.04
Registered electors		6,426		▲1.04
INC gain from BJP		Swing		

=== Assembly Election 2004 ===
2004 Arunachal Pradesh Legislative Assembly election : Pakke-Kessang
Party	Candidate	Votes	%	±%
BJP	Techi Hemu	2,898	58.64%	New
INC	Niani Natung	2,044	41.36%	▼12.21
Margin of victory		854	17.28%	▲10.13
Turnout		4,942	75.83%	▲7.63
Registered electors		6,360		▼1.38
BJP gain from INC		Swing		

=== Assembly Election 1999 ===
1999 Arunachal Pradesh Legislative Assembly election : Pakke-Kessang
Party	Candidate	Votes	%	±%
INC	Dera Natung	2,421	53.57%	▼2.77
AC	Techi Hemu	2,098	46.43%	New
Margin of victory		323	7.15%	▼15.15
Turnout		4,519	72.00%	▼12.18
Registered electors		6,449		▲5.31
INC hold		Swing		

=== Assembly Election 1995 ===
1995 Arunachal Pradesh Legislative Assembly election : Pakke-Kessang
Party	Candidate	Votes	%	±%
INC	Dera Natung	2,838	56.34%	▲8.68
Independent	Techi Hemu	1,715	34.05%	New
JD	Aka Tok	484	9.61%	▼25.57
Margin of victory		1,123	22.30%	▲9.81
Turnout		5,037	84.10%	▲3.25
Registered electors		6,124		▲37.25
INC hold		Swing		

=== Assembly Election 1990 ===
1990 Arunachal Pradesh Legislative Assembly election : Pakke-Kessang
Party	Candidate	Votes	%	±%
INC	Dera Natung	1,680	47.66%	New
JD	Natung Tacheng	1,240	35.18%	New
Independent	Lagu Tayem	605	17.16%	New
Margin of victory		440	12.48%	
Turnout		3,525	80.28%	
Registered electors		4,462		
INC win (new seat)				

== See also ==
- Pakke-Kessang district
- List of constituencies of Arunachal Pradesh Legislative Assembly
