= Lhoba language =

Lhoba (Lho-pa, Luoba) may be any of the languages of the Lhoba people, such as:

- Adi
- Bokar
- Idu Mishmi
