= Niani Natung =

Indian politician

Member of the Arunachal Pradesh Legislative Assembly from Pakke-Kessang
- In office 2001–2004

Minister of State for Social welfare, Women and Child development
- In office 2001–2004

Personal details
- Born: 15 May 1968
- Died: 31 August 2013 (aged 45)
- Party: Indian National Congress
- Spouse: Dera Natung

Niani Natung (15 May 1968 – 31 August 2013) was an Indian politician from the Indian National Congress. She served as an MLA and Cabinet Minister, handling the portfolio of Social welfare, Women and Child Development. She was the wife of Dera Natung.

== Political career ==
After her husband, Dera Natung's death in a helicopter crash in May 2001, she was elected as an MLA, winning the by-election of the Pakke-Kessang Assembly constituency in East Kameng district, which was conducted on 20 September 2001. She was appointed Minister of State for Social welfare, Women and Child development. She was the first lady minister from the Nyishi community. Niani served as Chairperson of the Arunachal Pradesh State Social Welfare Board. She also held the position of vice president of Arunachal Pradesh Mahila Congress Committee.

== Death ==
On 31 August 2013, she died after a brief illness. Two sons and two daughters survive her. Her last rites were performed with full state honours.
