= Pakke-Kessang district =

- District of Arunachal Pradesh
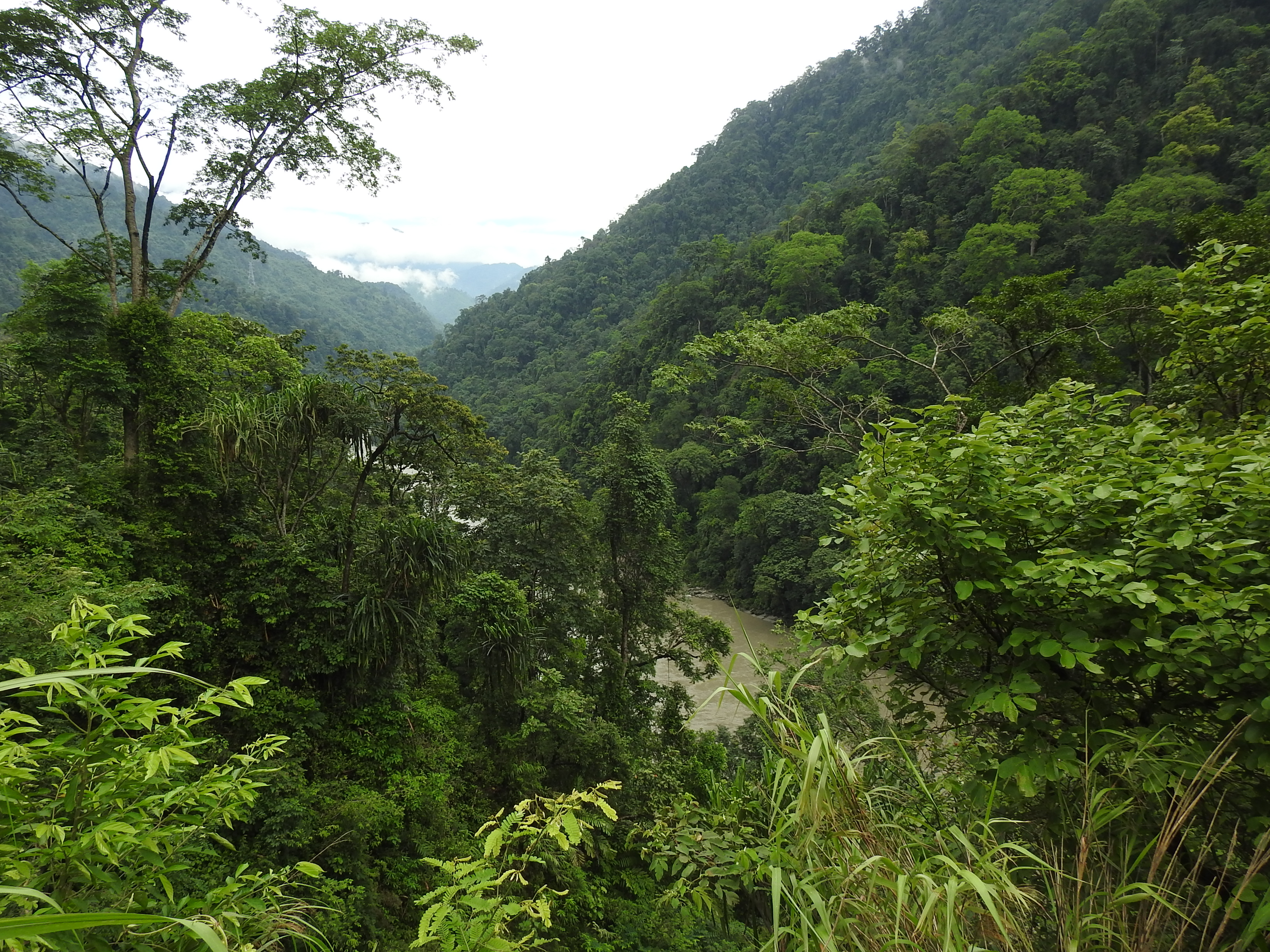
- Kameng River in Pakke Tiger Reserve
- Pakke-Kessang district Location in Arunachal Pradesh
- Coordinates: 27.0472° N, 93.0176° E
- Country: India
- State: Arunachal Pradesh
- Established: 2018
- Headquarters: Lemmi

Area
  - Total: 2,483.26 km^{2} (958.79 sq mi)

Population (2026)
  - Total: 21,577
  - Density: 8.6890/km^{2} (22.504/sq mi)
  - Urban: 983
- Time zone: UTC+05:30 (IST)
- Website: official website

Pakke-Kessang district is a district located in the state of Arunachal Pradesh in the Northeast of India. The district used to be a part of the neighboring district, East Kameng, and has been created out of its five southernmost administrative units: Pizirang|Pijerang, Passa Valley, Pakke-Kessang, Dissing Passo and Seijosa. The district headquarters of Pakke-Kessang is located at Lemmi (near the Papum Pare boundary).

Pakke-Kessang lies to the south of National Highway 13 (part of the Trans-Arunachal Highway), along the borders of Arunachal Pradesh and Assam. It borders West Kameng to the west, East Kameng to the northwest, Sonitpur and Biswanath to the south, Papum Pare to the southeast and Kra Daadi to the east. Most of the district is part of Nameri National Park.

== Administrative and political divisions ==
Pakke-Kessang is a constituency within the Arunachal Pradesh Legislative Assembly.

== Tourist attractions ==
The district's numerous foothills are covered in lush greenery, with tourist attractions located in the Passa Valley and Pakke Valley areas. The Passa Valley covers the northern part of the district, from Pijerang to Lumdung and Rilloh, while the Pakke Valley covers the central and southern parts of the district.

Notable attractions in the Pakke-Kessang district include:

- Lemmi: The district capital where tribal dance festivals are held
- Lumdung: Wintering grounds of certain species of migratory birds
- Rilloh: A tourist village located approximately 78km south of Seppa in East Kameng district
- Pakke-Kessang Hill Station: Located 144km southeast of Seppa and known for its views of the Himalayas
- Pakke Tiger Reserve: Located 64km north of Tezpur and 225km southwest of Seppa
- The Pakke River: Known for fishing, which requires permits issued by the district headquarters

=== Flora and fauna ===
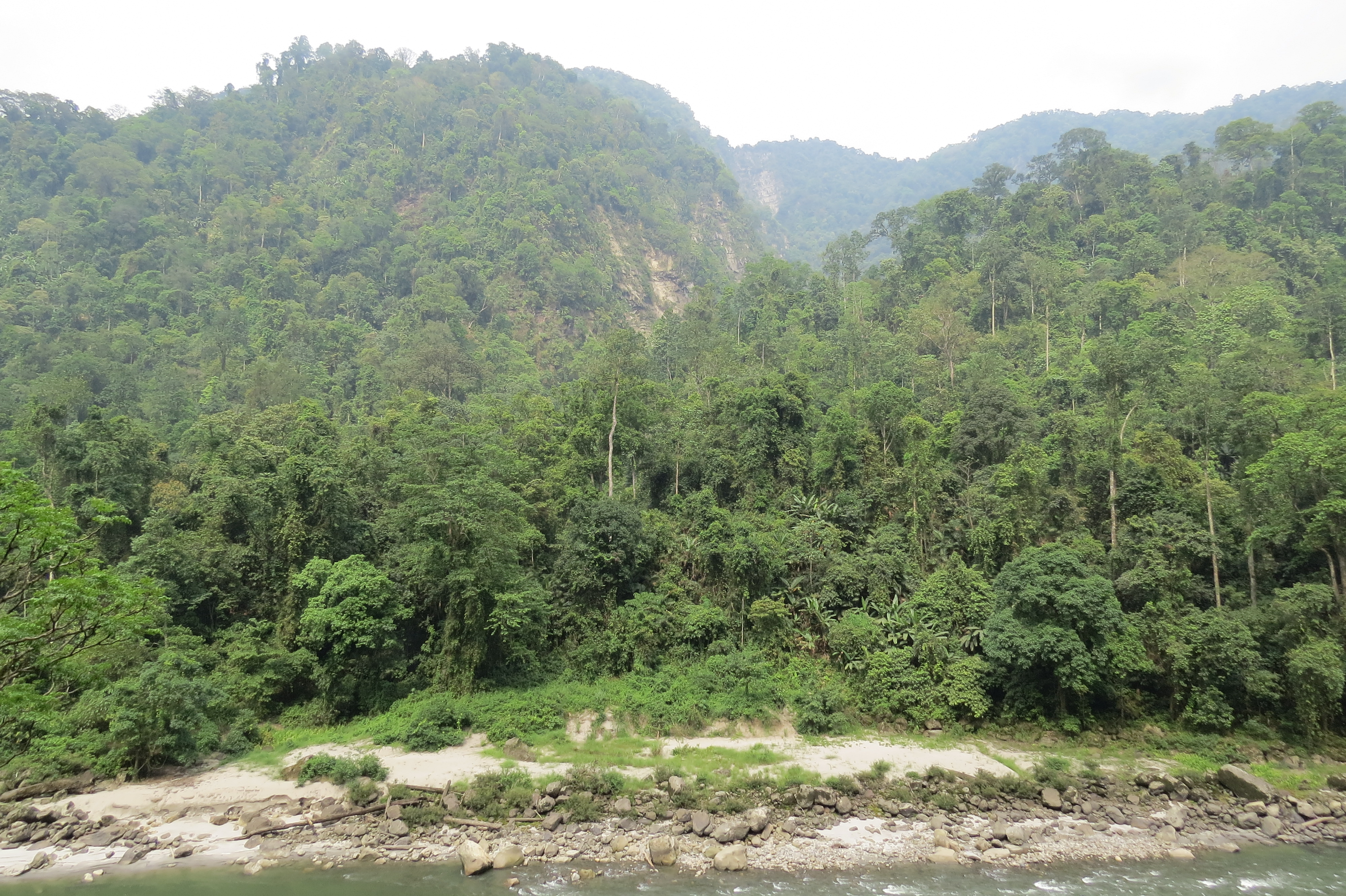
A view of the Pakke Tiger Reserve

In 1977, the Pakhui Wildlife Sanctuary was founded Pakke-Kessang. It has an area of 862 km^{2} (332.8 mi^{2}).

=== Seijosa ===
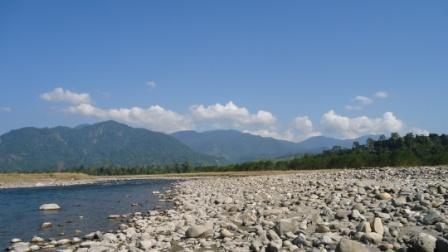
Seijosa Scenery

Seijosa is a small area within Pakke-Kessang along the Pakke river that is inhabited by the Nyishi, Galo and Puroik people. The Pakke Wildlife Sanctuary is located here. It is popular among tourists as a picnic location. Seijosa was heavily flooded in 2004, but has recovered since. Around the foothills of Seijosa, there are frequent sights of wild elephants, other wild animals, and varieties of birds, specially Hornbills from Pakke Tiger Reserve.

=== Population ===
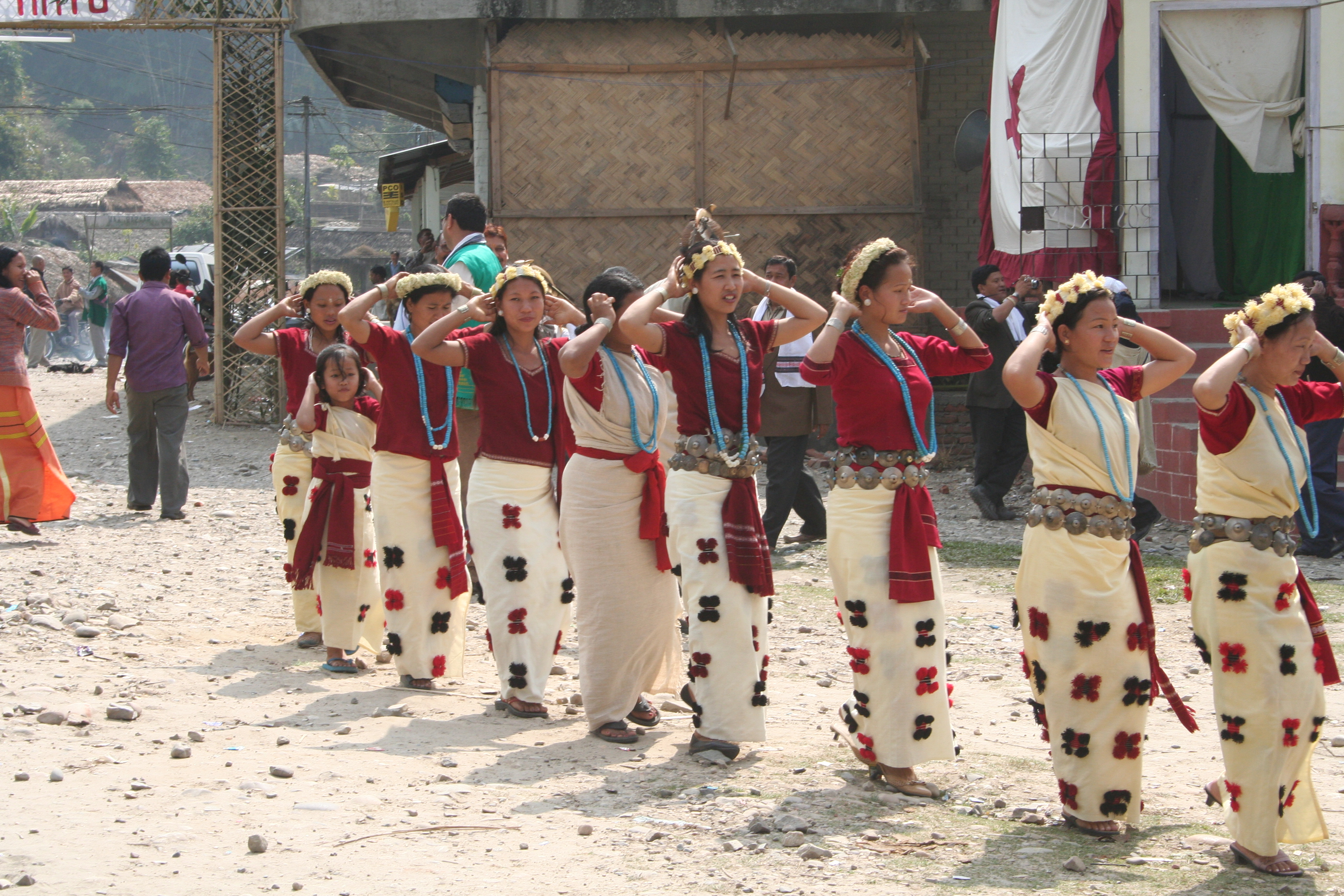
Nyishi People

Based on 2011 census data, the population at that time was 15,358. Scheduled Tribes are 13,646 which is 88.85% of the population. The district is inhabited by various tribes of similar origin but with distinct cultures and beliefs, practicing the Donyi-Polo religion. The most populous of these, the Nyishi, are scattered throughout the entire district. Other tribes, especially the Gallo, Puroik are found in regions near the Pakke, Passa, Papu, Dissing and Passo river.

Since independence, much of the population has relocated to the district capital, Seppa. Festivals such as the Nyokum of the Nyishi, Gumkum-Gumpa of Puroik and Mopin of the Gallo are celebrated in full flair in Pakke Kessang Distt.

Christians were 9,158 which is 59.63% of the population. Other religions (mainly Donyi-Polo) were 3,358 which is 21.86% of the population. Hindus were 2,606 which is 16.97% of the population. Buddhists were 115 which is 0.74% of the population and Muslims are 96 which is 0.63% of the population.

=== Language ===
At the time of the 2011 census, 85.05% of the population spoke Nyishi, 2.94% Nepali, 2.53% Adi, 1.59% Bengali, 1.37% Hindi and 1.28% Assamese as their first language.

==== Koro ====
The Koro is a Tibeto-Burman language spoken by approximately 800–1,200 people in the East Kameng district who live among the Aka (Hruso), but their language is distantly related, with distinct words for basic vocabulary. Although it has resemblances to Tani further to the east, it appears to be a separate branch of Tibeto-Burman. Koro is unlike any language in the various branches of the Tibeto-Burman family. Researchers hypothesize it may have originated from a group of people enslaved and brought to the area.

Koro was recognized as a separate language in 2010 by a linguistic team of David Harrison, Gregory Anderson, and Ganesh Murmu while documenting two Hruso languages (Aka and Miji) as part of National Geographic's "Enduring Voices" project. It was noticed by earlier researchers.

== See also ==
- List of districts of Arunachal Pradesh
