= Yano language =

Tani language of India

Yano
- Yano Dafla
- Region: Arunachal Pradesh
- Language family: Sino-Tibetan: Tani; Nishi?; Yano

Language codes
- ISO 639-3: (included as Nishi)
- Glottolog: None

Yano is a Tani language of India, possibly a variety of Nishi.
