= Lhoba people =

Ethnic group of Tibet

Lhoba (Bokaer, Luoba, Lhopa, Loba, Yidu, Bengru)
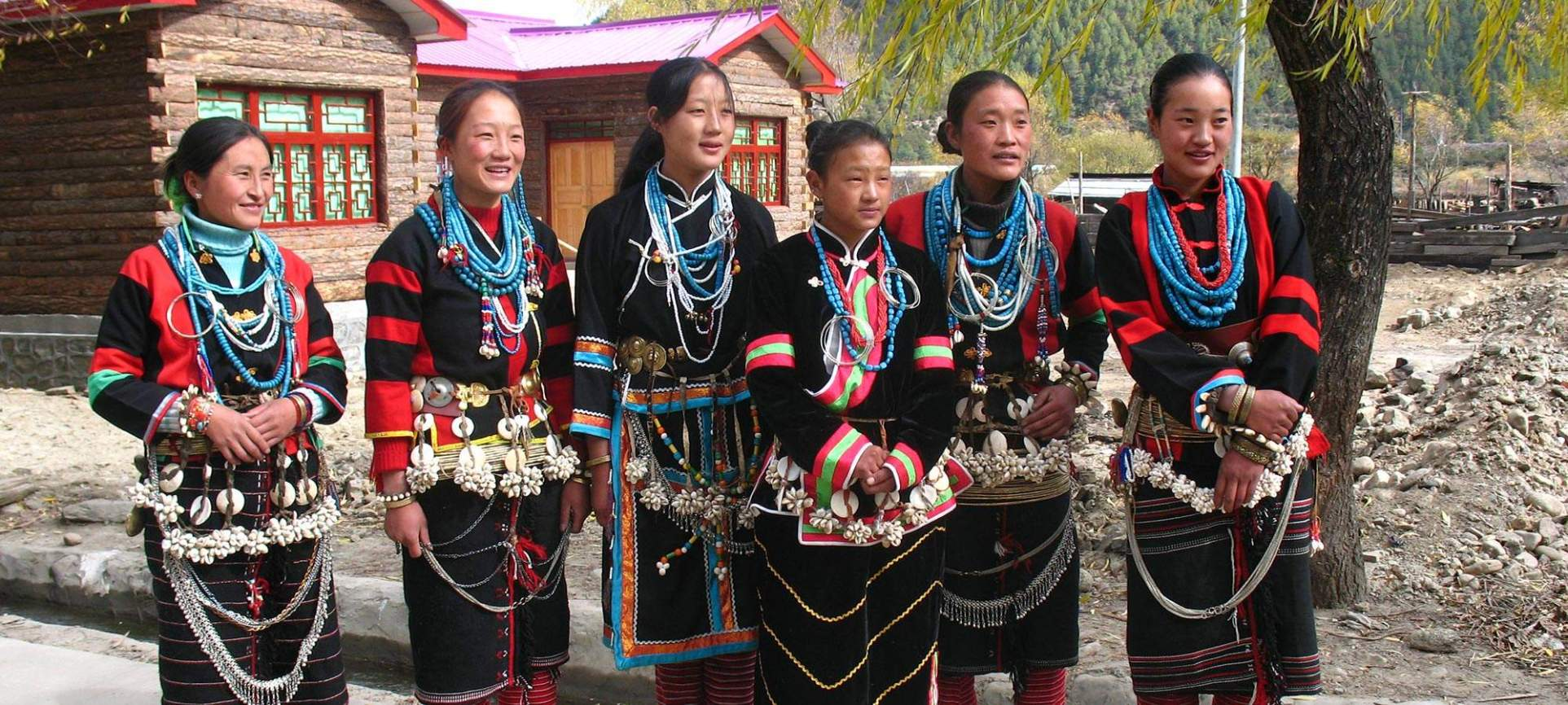
- Lhoba ethnic women

Regions with significant populations
- China: 4,237 (2020)

Languages
- Bokar, Idu Mishmi, Adi, Tibetic languages, Mandarin

Religion
- Animism, Christianity

Related ethnic groups
- Tibetan

Lhoba (Note: Also Luoba) (English translation: Southerners; Chinese: 珞巴族; pinyin: Luòbāzú; Standard Tibetan: ལྷོ་པ།) is any of a diverse amalgamation of Sino-Tibetan-speaking tribespeople living in and around Pemako, a region in southeastern Tibet including Mainling, Medog and Zayü counties of Nyingchi and Lhünzê County of Shannan, Tibet.

In 1965 the Chinese government officially recognised Lhoba as one of the 56 ethnic groups in China. Lhobas are one of the smallest ethnic minority groups in China. Numbering 4,237 people, they make up about 0.1% of the population of the Tibet Autonomous Region.

== Etymology ==
Lhoba is the Tibetan exonym for the inhabitants of the Lhoyü region. The name means "southerners".

== History ==
The area nowadays inhabited by the modern Lhoba people was known in medieval texts as Lhoyü (or Luoyu, lho-yul, ལྷོ༌ཡུལ་). Lhoyü is now the name of an area in Tibet, while Lower Lhoyü is part of the Indian state of Arunachal Pradesh. Luoyu came under the control of Tibet from the 7th century onwards.

It is not currently known whether modern-day Lhoba peoples in fact inhabited Luoyu at the time of Tibetan conquest, nor whether languages spoken by modern-day Lhoba peoples are indigenous to this region or not. While most Tani tribespeople living in modern-day Arunachal Pradesh point to a traditional homeland in or around this region, there is currently no independent means of verification.

Most people designated as "Lhoba" within the modern-day Tibet Autonomous Region (TAR) actually refer to themselves via a diverse set of endonyms, speak different languages, and do not traditionally self-identify as a single entity. The two main tribal groups which fall under the designation "Lhoba" in the TAR are the Mishmi people (simplified Chinese: 义都; pinyin: Yìdū), who speak the Idu Mishmi language, and the speakers of the Bokar dialect of Abo Tani, who are found in far greater numbers inside Arunachal Pradesh, a state of modern-day India claimed by China.

Other groups identified by Chinese authorities as "Lhoba" include the Tagin people, who speak the Bangni-Tagin language.

Lhobas, with respect to the Chinese perception of Southern Tibet (administered by India as Arunachal Pradesh), have been part of Chinese documentary films and articles. This has been criticised as propaganda by pro-India propagandists such as Claude Arpi.

== Customs and dress ==
Many customs, habits and dress of different clan members may vary. The Lhoba men in Luoyu wear knee-length black jackets without sleeves and buttons made out of sheep's wool. They wear helmet-like hats either made from bearskin or woven from bamboo stripes or rattan laced with bearskin. They also wear ornaments that include earrings, necklaces made of beads, and bamboo plugs inserted into the ear lobe. The Lhoba women wear narrow-sleeved blouses and skirts of sheep's wool. The weight of the ornaments the womenfolk wear is a symbol of their wealth, which includes shells, silver coins, iron chains bells, silver and brass earrings. Both sexes usually go barefooted. Their dress are quite similar to the Tibetan costume. The Idu men wear a sword and waterproof cane helmet, and a chignon on their hair and shields made of buffalo hide. Yidu weaponry includes straight Tibetan sword, dagger, bow and poisoned arrows.

Among the Yidu Lhoba (Idu Mishmi), one of the sub-tribes is the Bebejia Mishmi. Bebejia Mishmi women are expert weavers and make excellent coats and blouses.

The Idu houses are divided into a number of rooms for use of every married person. Unmarried girls and boys sleep in separate rooms. A fireplace occupies the centre of the room, round which the inmates sleep. The Idu are polygamous and each wife has their own rooms in the house. The family is organised in patriarchal principles. The inheritance of a widow is exceptional compared to a mother's.

The wooden pillow of the master of the house is considered taboo to the inmates of the house as it is considered improper to sit upon it. Guests are not allowed to enter the room of the master of the house. The animal skulls preserved in the house are considered to be sacred.

The slash and burn method of cultivation, known as Jhum is the mainstay of the Idus, and clearing of land is carried for every three to five years. The important crops they raise are paddy, arum, tapioca, millet and maize. Rice is the staple food supplemented by millet maize and tapioca. They also take leafy vegetables, beans, gourd, sweet potato etc. Animal flesh is considered taboo to Idu woman. The Yidu also consume "Yu", a locally brewed rice beer, and rice beer prepared by a woman during her period is taboo to a priest.

The Idu calendar was based upon the menstrual period of the women and dating is done by untying one each from a number of knots put on a piece of string. Traditional village panchayat (abbala) settle all internal disputes within the tribe.

== Culture and religion ==
Lhoba people speak Tibeto-Burman language of Tani and Mishmi branches. In the past, when there was no writing, the Lhobas kept track of history through telling their descendants and tying knot codes about their past. Their literature poses a significant influence on their Tibetan counterparts. They are known as "Bokar" in Arunachal Pradesh of northeast India and are found in the Pidi and Monigong circles of Arunachal Pradesh. They trace their origin from a common forefather, Abotani. They follow the genealogy counting from Abotani as Nijum-Jumsi-Siki-Kiyor-Yorkar-Kardung-Duram-Ramdung/Ramgu/Ramgo. All Bokar groups have originated from Ramdung, Ramgo and Ramgu. Their immediate brothers are Galo, Ramo, Libo/Pailibo and Tagin.

The majority of Lhoba (Bokar) in India have now been converted to Christianity. Most are Pentecostal, although other denominations are also present.

The Lhoba engage in barter trade with the Tibetans, trading goods like animal hides, musk, bear paws, dye (locally knowns as tamen or botanically known as Rubia cordifolia) and captured game for farm tools, salt, wool, clothing, grain and tea from Tibetan traders. As a result of this constant trading, they have been increasingly influenced by the Tibetans in their dress. Many Lhobas have converted to Tibetan Buddhism in recent years as they traded with Buddhist monasteries, frequently blending it with their indigenous animist beliefs, which traditionally have deep roots in the tiger. Others, remain animistic, especially those in Arunachal Pradesh, who follow Donyi-Poloism; the pilgrimage centre of their community lies at Atho-Popu the Dibang valley. The stories about immigration are told along the banks of twelve rivers in the Dibang valley, the clustered area known as Cheithu-Huluni. The Yidu traditionally believe in a supreme god named "Inni".

Festivals such as Reh are celebrated to appease the mold deities, who are traditionally believed to control the peace and prosperity of the people. Celebration with great fanfare and the performance of priest dances marks the end of the festival.

There are four funeral variants among the Yidu Lhoba (Idu Mishmi), and people of different social status would choose to conduct any of the variants. In all variants, an Igu priest would recite mourning songs for the dead. Mithuns are sacrificed in the Yah variant of the funeral, which lasts for three to four days.

Lhoba boys are trained to hunt at an early age. Women have low status in society and have no inheritance rights from their husbands or fathers.

The Lhoba enjoy a subtropical/warm temperate climate.

== Cuisine ==
Lhoba cuisine varies across regions. Staple foods are dumplings made of maize or millet flour, rice or buckwheat or sago palm starch. In places near Tibetan communities people eat tsampa, potatoes, buttered tea and spicy food. Heavy drinkers and smokers, at celebrations the Lhobas sing and drink wine to celebrate good harvests and good luck. Buttered tea is their favorite drink. However, due to lack of salt, they suffer endemic goiter. Many are either born deaf or mute. Their population declined until recently due to this disease, and due to their low population, many either intermarry with Tibetans or with the tribal groups of Arunachal Pradesh, notably the Monpa.

== Dengba people ==
The Deng people (or Dengba, Chinese transcription of Taraon-Kaman languages: 代巴玫; Chinese: 僜人; Hanyu pinyin: Dèng Rén) are not officially recognised by the government of People's Republic of China. They are related to the Derung people of Yunnan or the Taron people of Myanmar. They live in nine villages in Tibet's Zayu County and virgin forest areas between the Himalayas and the Hengduan Mountains at an elevation of 1000 meters. Bradley (2007) reports 800 ta˧˩ ʒuaŋ˥ (Chinese: Darang Deng) and 200 kɯ˧˩ mɑn˧˥ (Chinese: Geman Deng; known as the Kaman or Miju Mishmi in India) in China, one village in Burma where they are known as Taraung, and the Taraon, Tayin, or Tain (formerly Digaru Mishmi) in northeastern India. Many of them have migrated from China to India.
