= Apatani =

Apatani may refer to:

- Apatani people, of northeastern India
- Apatani language, their Tani (Sino-Tibetan) language
