= Karko language =

Karko may be:

- Karko language (India)
- Karko language (Sudan)
