= Zhongsa Village (Lilong Township) =

Administrative village in Mainling County, Nyingchi City, Tibet

Zhongsa Village 仲萨村
- Country: China
- Region: Tibet
- City: Nyingchi
- County: Mainling County
- Township: Lilong Township

Zhongsa Village (Tibetan: གྲོང་གསར་གྲོང་ཚོ།, Wylie: grong gsar grong tsho; simplified Chinese: 仲萨村; traditional Chinese: 仲薩村) is an administrative village under the jurisdiction of Lilong Township, Mainling County, Nyingchi City, Tibet, with the zoning code 540422203202. The grassroots mass autonomous organization in which the village is located is the Zhongsa Villagers' Committee.

Zhongsa Village is adjacent to Caiba Village, Lilong Village, Barang Village, Jiabang Village, Yusong Village, Langgong Village, and Dejixin Village.
