= Dera Natung =

Indian politician

Member of the Arunachal Pradesh Legislative Assembly from Pakke-Kessang
- In office 1989–2001

Personal details
- Born: 1 July 1964 Veo village, East Kameng district, Arunachal Pradesh
- Died: 8 May 2001 (aged 36)
- Party: Indian National Congress
- Spouse: Niani Natung

Dera Natung (1 July 1964 – 8 May 2001) was an Indian politician who served as the Education Minister of Arunachal Pradesh. He was elected as MLA for three consecutive terms since 1989 from the Pakke-Kessang Assembly constituency of Arunachal Pradesh. He served as the Cabinet minister in the Government of Arunachal Pradesh, holding the portfolios of Sports & Youth Affairs, Information, Public Relations & Printing, Tourism, Arts and Culture, Social Welfare, Fisheries and Education. He died in a helicopter crash in 2001.

== Early life and career ==
He was born on 1 July 1964, in Veo village of East Kameng district, Arunachal Pradesh. He did his early education at Government Higher Secondary School, Seppa. He attended Sainik School, Imphal, Manipur, where he did his Matriculation and passed his class 12th from Government Higher Secondary School, Bomdila. He graduated with Honours in Political science from Jawaharlal Nehru College, Pasighat, in 1984 and a Master of Arts in the same subject from Punjab University in 1986.

He was active in student politics. He served as the founding President of the All Nyishi Students' Union in 1982. He was appointed General Secretary of the All East Kameng District Students' Union in 1983. After completing higher education, he worked as Programme Officer at All India Radio, Itanagar, from 1986 to 1989. He was elected as a member of the Arunachal Pradesh Legislative Assembly from the Pakke-Kessang Assembly constituency for three consecutive terms since 1989.

He held portfolios as Minister of Sports & Youth Affairs, Information, Public Relations & Printing, Tourism, Arts and Culture, Social Welfare, Fisheries and Education. He also served as President of the Arunachal Pradesh Congress Committee from 1998 until early 2001.

== Death and commemoration ==
On 8 May 2001, Dera Natung was killed when a Pawan Hans's helicopter, MI-172, carrying him from Itanagar to West Kameng, crashed due to rough weather.

On 27 May 2001, the state government renamed Government College, Itanagar, to Dera Natung Government College (DNGC) to commemorate his contribution to the field of education. A statue of Natung has been installed on the college campus, which Education minister Honchun Ngandam unveiled.
