= Hemu (disambiguation) =

Hemu or Hemachandra was a 16th-century Indian general and king.

Hemu may also refer to:

- HEMU-430X, South Korean high-speed train
- Hemu Adhikari (1919–2003), an Indian cricketer
- Hemu Kalani, an Indian revolutionary and freedom fighter from Sindh
- Techi Hemu, Indian politician
- Haute école de musique de Lausanne, the Conservatory of Lausanne, Switzerland
- Hemu Village, a tourist village in Xinjiang, China

== See also ==
- Hemachandran (disambiguation)
