= Tangam language =

Sino-Tibetan language of North-East India

Tangam
- Region: Arunachal Pradesh
- Native speakers: 150 (2013-01-10)
- Language family: Sino-Tibetan: Tani; Western (?); Tangam

Language codes
- ISO 639-3: included under Adi [adi]
- Glottolog: tang1377
- ELP: Tangam
- Tangam is classified as Critically Endangered language by the UNESCO Atlas of the World's Languages in Danger.

Tangam is an endangered Sino-Tibetan language of the Tani subgroup spoken in Arunachal Pradesh state in Northeast India. The total number of Tangam speakers has been alternatively estimated at 150 and 253. The primary Tangam village is Kuging [kugɨŋ], which is located at 28°57'22"N and 94°59'25"E, approximately four hours' walk from Tuting in Upper Siang district. Tangam speakers are also found in some neighbouring villages, as well as in Tuting town.

Most Tangam are hill tribespeople, with a material culture that is similar to that of most Tani peoples of the Siang River valley. However, due to close present and historical contacts with Memba (Bodic-speaking) peoples of Tibet and Arunachal Pradesh, Tangam have also adopted some Tibetan cultural traits.

In the only large-scale work to treat the Tani languages, Sun (1993) had no access to Tangam data and supposed it to be a variety of Damu. Post (July 2013) suggested that this was probably not the case, and that Tangam was a distinct Tani language, being mutually-unintelligible to a large extent with any other Tani language. Genealogically, Tangam may align with the Western Tani languages, although it resembles the Eastern Tani languages with which it is in contact to a greater degree.

A comprehensive description of Tangam (grammar, lexicon and texts) was published in 2017.
