= Na dialect =

Sino-Tibetan language of Arunachal Pradesh, India

Na
- Bangni
- Region: Assam
- Native speakers: (1,500 estimate for year 2000 cited 1997)
- Language family: Sino-Tibetan: Tani; Western Tani; Subansiri; Bangni; Na

Language codes
- ISO 639-3: nbt
- Glottolog: naaa1245
- ELP: Na
- Na is classified as Critically Endangered language by the UNESCO Atlas of the World's Languages in Danger.

Na (Nah) is a dialect of Bangni, a Sino-Tibetan language spoken in India. Na is spoken in nine villages of Taksing Circle, Upper Subansiri District, Arunachal Pradesh (Pertin 1994:1). There are four clans, namely Chedar, Hafi, Tisi, and Hari.
