= Tagin =

Tagin may refer to:

- Tagin people of Northeast India
  - Tagin language, the Sino-Tibetan language spoken by them
- Tagin (Hebrew writing), decorations drawn over some Hebrew letters in Jewish scrolls
- Tajine, or tagin, a North African stew
