= Damu language =

Tani language spoken in Tibet

Damu
- Region: Tibet
- Native speakers: (80 cited 1985)
- Language family: Sino-Tibetan: Tani; Western?; Damu
- Dialects: Panggi?

Language codes
- ISO 639-3: None (mis)
- Glottolog: damu1236

Damu is a poorly documented Tani (Sino-Tibetan) language spoken in Tibet. Only 80 speakers of this language were reported to exist in 1985, and the language community was experiencing strong language contact with speakers of Bodic languages at that time. No documentation or description of the Damu language other than some brief remarks and a word list in Ouyang (1985) appears to exist, and it is not known whether the Damu community is still intact and speaking their language.

The precise genetic affiliation of Damu remains unclear. Although Sun (1993) clearly identified Damu as a member of the Tani languages, he noted some difficulties that prevented its precise alignment within either Western Tani or Eastern Tani. In addition, Sun speculated that Damu might represent a northern variety of the Tangam language. Post (2013a) concluded that Tangam and Damu are in fact distinct, despite sharing a number of features. In particular, both Tangam and Damu share an early sound change, which would suggest aligning them with Western Tani, despite sharing an overall Eastern Tani–like profile.

== Phonology ==
Consonants
		Labial	Alveolar	Retroflex	Alveolo-palatal	Palatal	Velar	Glottal
Plosive	oral	p b	t d			c ɟ	k g	ʔ
Plosive	aspirated	pʰ	tʰ				kʰ	
Affricate	oral	pr br	ts dz	ʈʂ ɖʐ	tɕ dʑ			
Affricate	aspirated		tsʰ	ʈʂʰ	tɕʰ			
Fricative			s z			ç	x	ɦ
Nasal		m̥ m	n		ɲ	ŋ̊ ŋ		
Approximant		w	l̥ l	r		j		

Vowels
	Front		Central	Back
	Unrounded	Rounded	Central	Back
Syllabic	(ɹ̩)		(ɻ̩)	
High	i iː	y yː	ɯ ɯː	u uː
Mid	e eː	ø øː	ə əː	o oː
Low			a aː	

- Vowel length is only contrastive in open syllables.
- /ɹ̩/ and /ɻ̩/ are only found in loanwords from Tibetan.

Additionally, the following diphthongs have been observed: /iu/, /iə/, /ia/, /iaː/, /yu/, /yo/, /yə/, /ui/, /ue/, /ei/, /əɯ/.
