= Hill Miri dialect =

Tani language of Arunachal Pradesh, India

Nyishi (Kamle)
- Sarak
- Region: Arunachal Pradesh
- Ethnicity: Nyishi (Kamle) people
- Native speakers: 10,000 (2008)
- Language family: Sino-Tibetan: Tani; West Tani; Nyishi; Nyishi (Kamle)

Language codes
- ISO 639-3: None (mis); Individual code: mrg – (included under Plains Miri)
- Glottolog: hill1258
- ELP: Hill Miri
- Hill Miri is classified as Definitely Endangered by the UNESCO Atlas of the World's Languages in Danger.

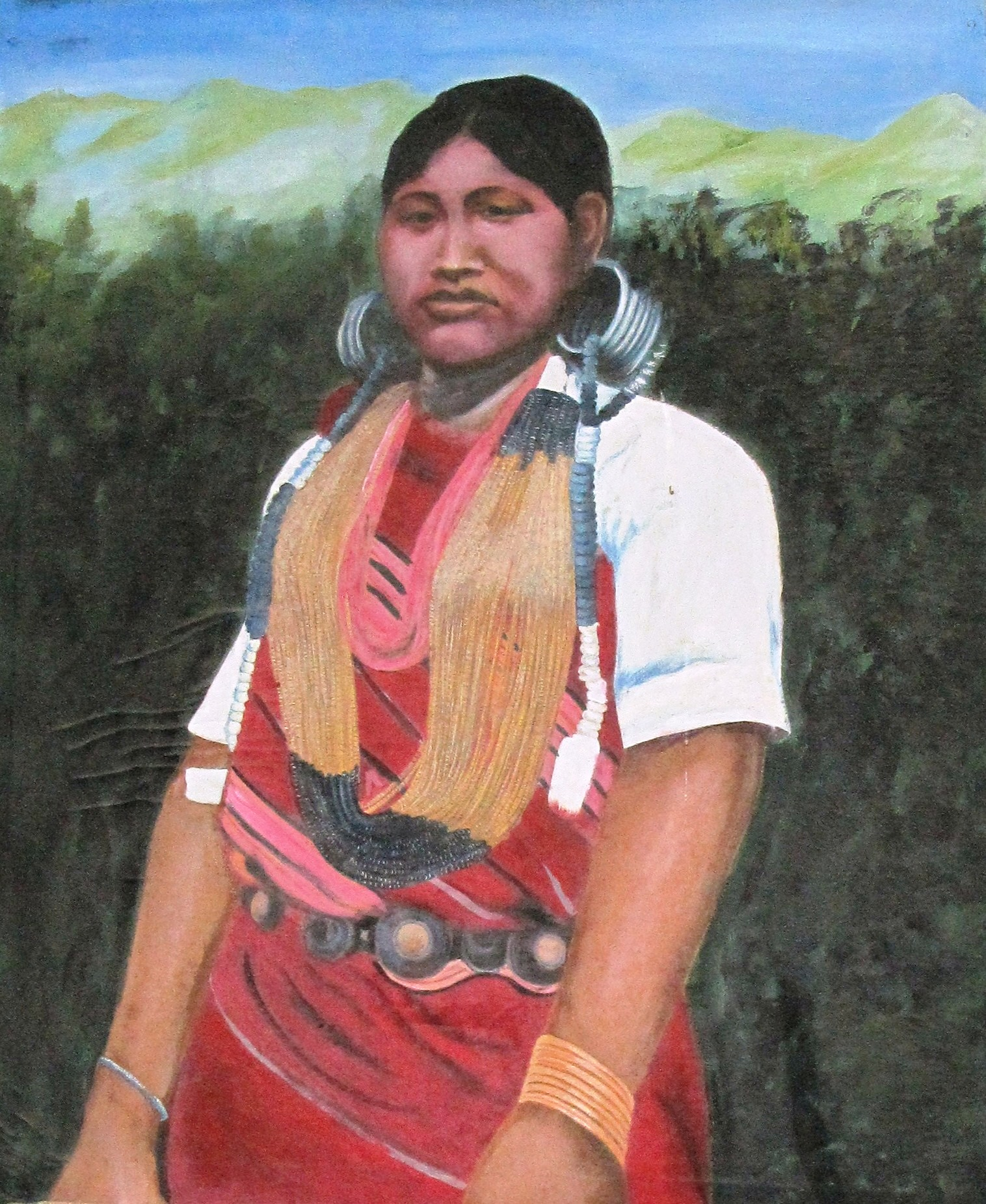
Portrait of a girl of the Nyishi people of Kamle

Nyishi (Kamle) or Sarak is a Tani language of India. It is spoken in Arunachal Pradesh by an estimated 9,000 people of the Nyishi tribe. It appears to be a dialect of the Nishi language.

Though Hili Miri is listed under Mising [mrg] in Ethnologue, Burling and Sun–experts on the Aranuchal Pradesh and Tani languages–treat Hill Miri and Mising as separate and distinct languages belonging to different branches of the Tani subgroup.

== Description ==
Nyishi (muri-mugli) is a member of the Tani branch of the Sino-Tibetan languages and is considered a dialect of the Nishi language. It is spoken by 9,000 people in the northern regions of India by the Nyishi people of Kamle. It is threatened because the younger generation is slowly breaking away from their people's traditions and language. Many audio books of gospel narratives in the Nyishi language of Kamle have been collected.

== History of scholarship ==
George Abraham Grierson, in his survey of India regarding its linguistics, researched the Nyishi language and published a record over a century ago.

== Phonology ==
=== Consonants ===
The following table includes an inventory of Nyishi (Kamle) consonants.

		Labial	Alveolar	Post- alveolar	Velar	Glottal
Nasal		m	n	ɲ	ŋ	
Stop	voiceless	p	t	c	k	
Stop	voiced	b	d	ɟ	ɡ	
Fricative			s	ʃ		h
Approximant		w	l	j		
Trill?			r			

Vowels are front /i, e/, central /ɨ, ʉ, ə, a/, and back /u, o/. Vowels occur long and short.

== Grammar ==
The basic Nyishi (Kamle) grammar and basic word order are like those of related Sino-Tibetan languages, similar to that of Nishi.

=== Numerals ===
	Nyishi (Kamle)
1	aken
2	eñi
3	oum
4	epi
5	ango/angngo
6	ake
7	kenne
8	pine
9	kora
10	íri

=== Pronouns ===
==== Personal ====
	Singular	Plural
1st person	ngo	ngu-lu
2nd person	no	nu-lu
3rd person	bu, bú	bu-lu, bú-lu
