= Abotani =

Progenitor of the Tani tribes of Arunachal Pradesh and Assam, India

Regions with significant populations
- India Arunachal Pradesh: N/A
- China: N/A

Languages
- Tani

Religion
- Donyi-Polo (sun and moon)

Abotani or Abu Tani is considered the progenitor of the Tani tribes of the state of Arunachal Pradesh and Assam in India. Abotani are located in Tibet and Arunachal Pradesh. In China, Abotani tribes are recognized as part of Lhoba ethnic group. The Apatani, Mising, Adi, Galos, Tagin and Nyishi are the subtribes of Abotanis. They follow the Donyi-Polo religion and credit Abotani with the technique of rice cultivation.

== Etymology ==
The Abo or Abu means "father" and Tani means "human".

== Oral history ==
The following story is told by priests (miri) among the Adi people:

Once Abotani wandered in the forest seeking food. He went to Takar-Taji's place (Tatar-Taji) during a marriage ceremony where a gayal (sebbe) was sacrificed. Due to a trick of Abotani, Takar-Taji could sacrifice only one animal, which was meagre for distribution to the guest. Abotani's dog (Kipung) and deer (Dumpo) shared a packet of rotten soya seeds (the staple food in those days). The deer kicked the packet and ran away, chased by the dog. Abotani followed them. After many days, they reached Digo Ane ("Keeper of Land"; digo "land", Ane "mother"), where people were scattering rice powder to dry it in the sun. Abotani and the animals were caught and imprisoned. After many days, Abotani played a trick: he put a dead mole rat in his armpit and acted as if he were dying. Worried that they might anger the Takar-Taji people, the Digo Ane people freed Abotani and gave him rice, millet, and maize seed.

Other Tani legends reference Abotani: a woman in the Digo Ane region told him how to cultivate rice; Abotani was successful at rice cultivation thanks to his wise wife, Aio Diiliang Diibiu; however, he divorced her to marry another woman. The new wife's pursuit of leisure brought disgrace to his wealth; when Abotani realized this, he left the second wife and continued the cultivation on his own. Once he needed his sister's help to descend from a high tree he had climbed.

Events in Abotani's life and his quest for rice are part of Tani traditions and are celebrated in different periods of the year (following the rice cultivation season). Abutani is a symbol of the struggle of humankind for food and prosperity and of the need for harmony between man and woman to bring wealth to the family.

== See also ==
- Tani people
