= Lumdung =

- village
- Location within Arunachal Pradesh
- Coordinates: 27.28°N 93.09°E
- Country: India
- State: Arunachal Pradesh

Lumdung village located in East Kameng district, Arunachal Pradesh in India. It is inhabited by Nyishi (Bagni) people.
