= Tani Language Foundation =

Indian non-profit organisation

TLF
- Tani Language Foundation
- Abbreviation: TLF
- Formation: 2024
- Founder: Luke Lego
- Founded at: Arunachal Pradesh, India
- Type: Non-profit organization
- Purpose: Preservation and revitalization of Tani languages
- Official language: Tani languages
- President: Migom Pamegam
- Vice President: Hariprasad Doley
- Executive Member: Taba Domina, Koj Nampi, Nyayi Lombi, Tingom Godak, Pakbi Lombi, Nuyi Yirang, Alessandro David
- Advisors: Dr. Anujeema Saikia, Dr. Anna Belew, Yulha Lahwa
- Website: https://www.tanilanguagefoundation.org/

The Tani Language Foundation (TLF) is a not-for-profit organisation dedicated to reviving the Tani languages and the cultural heritage of the Tani people. The foundation traces its roots to late 2023, when it began as a private WhatsApp group of college students. However, it was officially established as a formal foundation in 2024, when it also began registering projects. Since then, it has worked on projects such as the "Living Dictionary" in collaboration with the Living Tongues Institute for Endangered Languages.
