= Hemachandran =

Hemachandran may refer to:

- Hemachandra (born 1988), Indian playback singer and music director
- Hemachandran (actor), Indian film actor
- J. Hemachandran (1932–2008), Indian politician and trade unionist

== See also ==
- Hemu (disambiguation), a diminutive of Hemachandra
- Hemachandra, 12th-century Indian Jain author of Sanskrit works
- Hemachandra Vikramaditya or Hemu, 16th-century Indian warrior and ruler
