= Zhongsa Village (Danniang Township) =

Zhongsa Village གྲོང་གསར་གྲོང་ཚོ། · 仲萨村
- Country: China
- Region: Tibet
- City: Nyingchi
- County: Mainling County
- Postal code: 860000
- Area code: 0894

Zhongsa Village (Tibetan: གྲོང་གསར་གྲོང་ཚོ།, Wylie: grong gsar grong tsho; simplified Chinese: 仲萨村; traditional Chinese: 仲薩村) is an administrative village under the jurisdiction of Danniang Township, Mainling County, Nyingchi City, Tibet, with the zoning code 540422200203. The grassroots mass autonomous organization in which the village is located is the Zhongsa Villagers' Committee.

Zhongsa Village, one of the 6 administrative villages in Danniang Township, is adjacent to Luxia Village, Baila Village, Sangba Village, Danniang Village, and Kangbure Village.
