= Ashing language =

Sino-Tibetan language of Arunachal Pradesh, India

Ashing
- Region: Arunachal Pradesh
- Native speakers: (undated figure of < 1,000)
- Language family: Sino-Tibetan: Tani?; Ashing

Language codes
- ISO 639-3: (covered by Adi adi)
- Glottolog: ashi1243
- ELP: Ashing

Ashing or Aashing is an unclassified Sino-Tibetan language, probably of the Tani branch, spoken at the headwaters of the Siang River in Northeastern India near the Tibetan border, from Ramsing in the south to Tuting in the north. The most populous Ashing settlements are Pango and Bomdo.
