= Bokar language =

Tani language spoken in Tibet and India

Bokar
- Bokar-Ramo
- Region: Arunachal Pradesh, Tibet
- Ethnicity: Lhoba
- Language family: Sino-Tibetan: Tani; Eastern Tani; Bokar
- Dialects: Bokar; Ramo

Language codes
- ISO 639-3: None (mis)
- Glottolog: boka1249
- ELP: Bokar
- Bokar is classified as Vulnerable by the UNESCO Atlas of the World's Languages in Danger.

Bokar or Bokar-Ramo (IPA: [bɔk˭ar ɡɔm]; pinyin: Bogar Luoba) is a Tani language spoken by the Lhoba in West Siang district, Arunachal Pradesh, India (Megu 1990) and Nanyi Township 南伊珞巴民族乡, Mainling County, Tibet Autonomous Region, China (Ouyang 1985).

The Ramo dialect is spoken in Mechukha Subdivision and Monigong Circle (Badu 2004).

== Phonology ==
=== Consonants ===
		Labial		Alveolar	(Alveolo-) palatal	Velar	Glottal
		plain	pal.	Alveolar	(Alveolo-) palatal	Velar	Glottal
Plosive	voiceless	p	pʲ	t		k	
Plosive	voiced	b	bʲ	d		ɡ	
Affricate	voiceless				tɕ		
Affricate	voiced				dʑ		
Fricative				(s)	ɕ		h, (ɦ)
Nasal		m	mʲ	n	ɲ	ŋ	
Trill				r			
Approximant		w		l	j		

- The pronunciation of /ɕ/ may vary between [ɕ] and [s] among different dialects.
- Some speakers may also pronounce /tɕ/ as [ts] when preceding vowels other than /i/.
- /h/ can be realized as either voiced [ɦ] or [h], when preceding /i/.
- Stops /p t k/ are heard as unreleased [p̚ t̚ k̚] in word-coda position.
- A retroflex affricate /tʂ/ can also occur only from Tibetan loanwords.

=== Vowels ===
	Front	Central	Back	
Close	i	(ɨ)	ɯ	u
Mid	e	ə	o	
Open		a		

- /ɯ/ can also be heard as more central [ɨ].
- /o/ is heard as more open and nasalized before /ŋ/ as [ɔ̃ŋ].

== Writing system ==
Bokar is written in the Latin script in India and the Tibetan script in China.

IPA	a	b	t͡ɕ	ʈ͡ʂ	d	e	ə	g	h	ɦ	i	ɯ	d͡ʑ	k	l	m	n	ŋ	n̠ʲ	o	p	r	ɕ	t	u	w	j	ʔ
Latin	a	b	c	ch	d	e	ë	g	h	hh	i	ï	j	k	l	m	n	ng	ny	o	p	r	s	t	u	w	y	'
Tibetan	ཨ	བ	ཙ	ཅ	ད	ཨེ		ག	ཧ	འ	ཨི		ཇ	ཀ	ལ	མ	ན	ང	ཉ	ཨོ	པ	ར	ས	ཏ	ཨུ	ཝ	ཡ	N/A

Diphthongs are written as a digraph of there vowels, <y> is used to mark palatalization.

Glottal stops before vowels are unwritten in tibetan.
