= Kuging =

Village in Arunachal Pradesh, India

Coordinates: 28.955°N 94.990°E

Kuging is a village in Upper Siang district of Arunachal Pradesh, India.
