= Golden Pagoda, Namsai =

Burmese style Buddhist temple in India

Golden Pagoda at Namsai
- Kongmu Kham
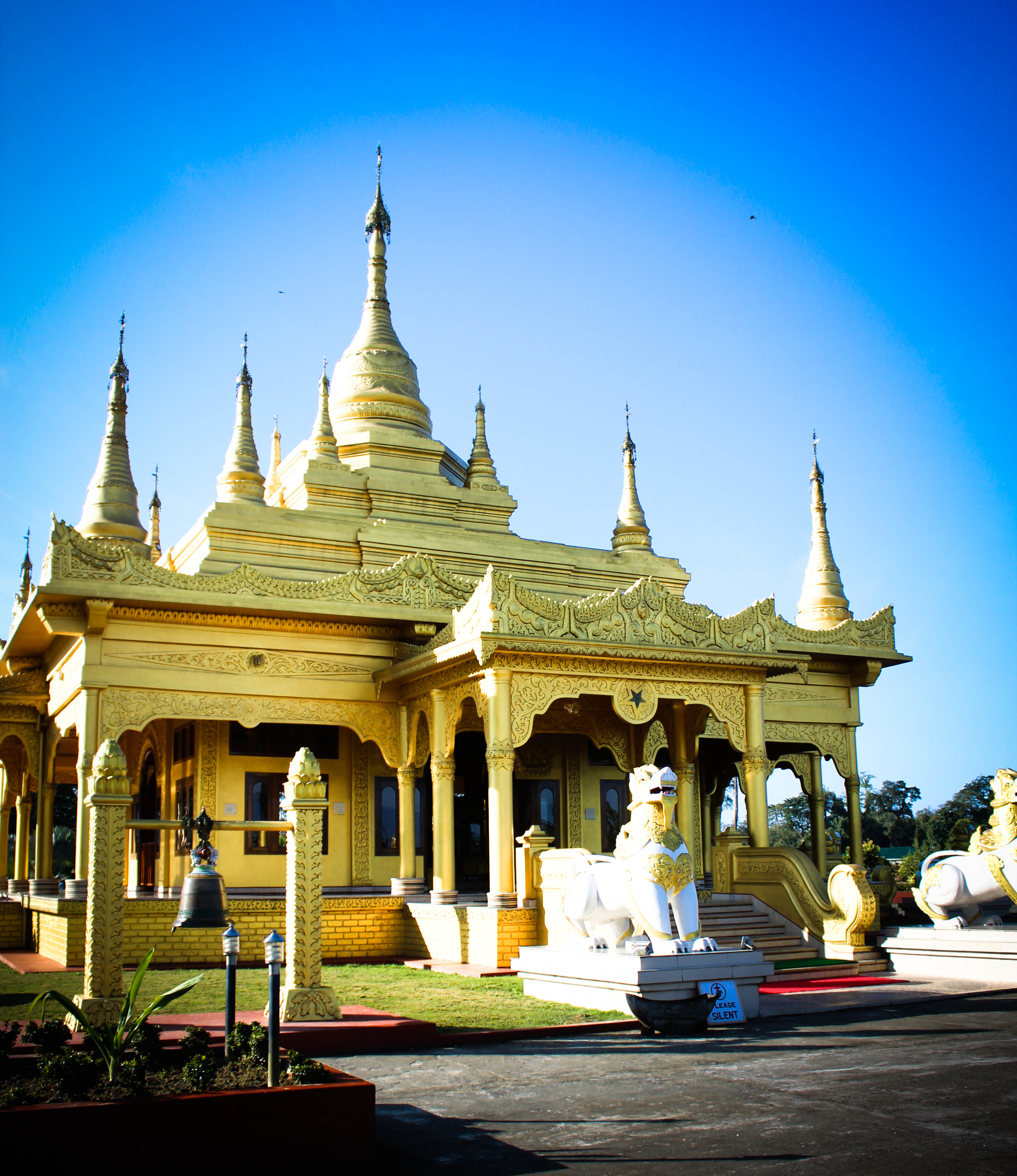

- Location within Arunachal Pradesh Location within India

Religion
- Affiliation: Theravada Buddhism other_info =: Sect: [[{{{sect}}}]]
- Deity: Buddha
- Festivals: Sangken, Kaṭhina

Location
- Country: India
- Interactive map of Golden Pagoda at Namsai
- Coordinates: 27.7725°N 95.9749°E

Architecture
- Founder: Chow Kon Yein
- Completed: 2010; 16 years ago

Website
- goldenpagoda.in

The Golden Pagoda of Namsai, also known as Kongmu Kham, in the Tai-Khamti language, is a Burmese-style Buddhist temple that was opened in 2010. It is located on a 20 hectares (49 acres) complex in Namsai District of Arunachal Pradesh, India and at a distance of 68 km (42 mi) from the nearest railway station Tinsukia, Assam. A sum of 3 crores was spent by Arunachal politician Chowna Mein, the local MLA in building the pagoda in a plot provided by the state government. The World Tripiṭaka Foundation is currently developing Kongmu Kham as the first international Tripiṭaka center in India.

In November 2026, the sacred relics of Shakyamuni Buddha were brought to the pagoda for public darshan from 14 to 20 November, the final leg of a three-week exposition across Tawang, Bomdila and Namsai organised by the Ministry of Culture.

== Kathina Civara Dana ==
The Kathina festival is the largest festival celebrated at the Golden Pagoda. The 2016 ceremony, held on 13 November also saw participation from Thai Buddhist monks. An image of Buddha which was earlier kept at Wat Bowonniwet Vihara known as the monks gifted the Pro Bpor Ror on behalf of the king Bhumibol Adulyadej of Thailand. The Thai monks also presented a Kalpatru (Money Tree) to the Golden Pagoda.

The ceremony of Loi-Krathong, which is marked by the release of floating lamps into the Mungchalinda Buddha pond, is also held on the festival's last day.
