= Techi Hemu =

Indian politician

Techi Hemu (born 1967 or 1968) is an Indian politician and member of the Bharatiya Janata Party. Hemu was a member of the Arunachal Pradesh Legislative Assembly from the Pakke-Kessang constituency in East Kameng district in 2004.
