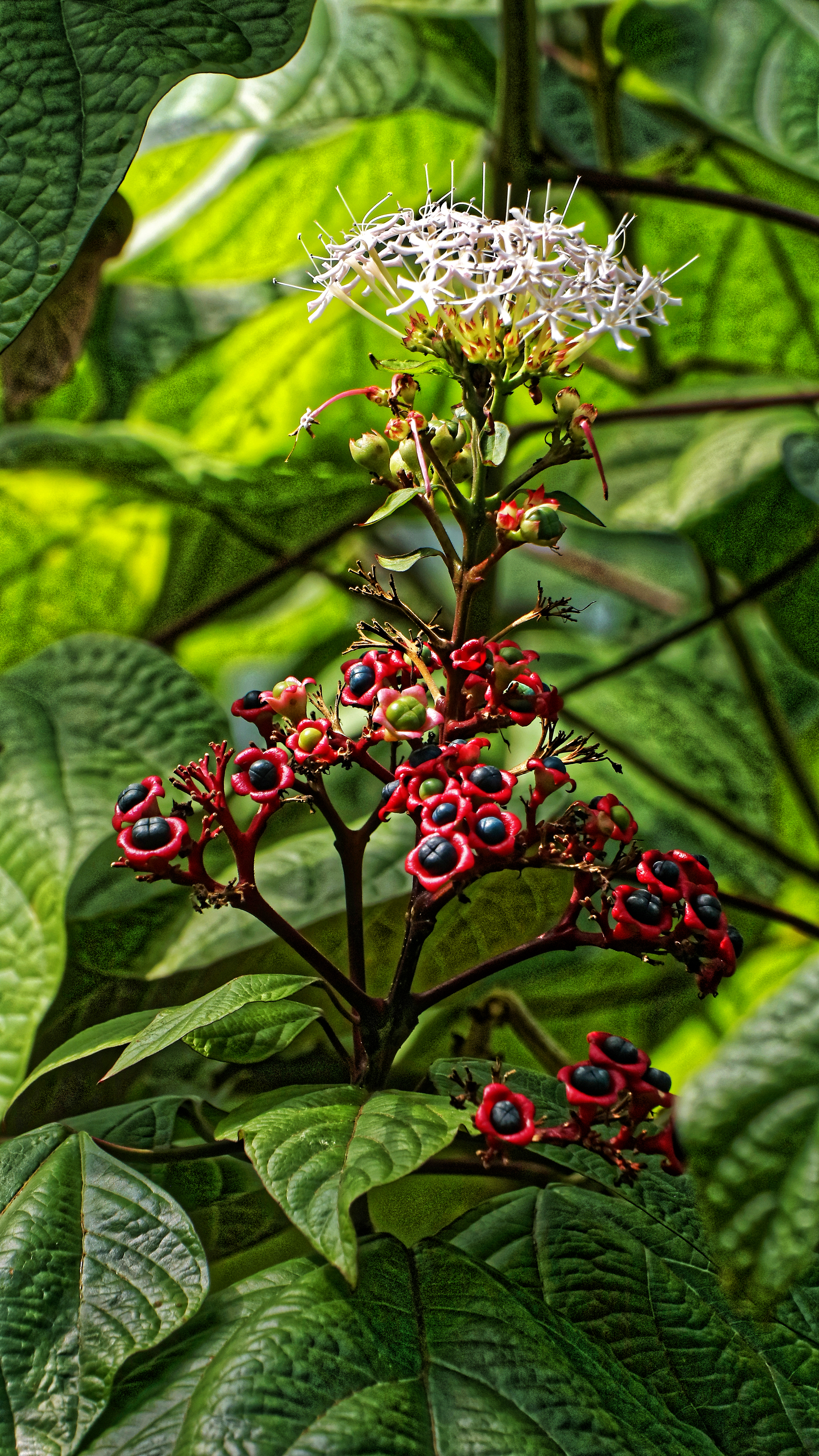

Scientific classification
- Kingdom: Plantae
- Clade: Tracheophytes
- Clade: Angiosperms
- Clade: Eudicots
- Clade: Asterids
- Order: Lamiales
- Family: Lamiaceae
- Genus: Clerodendrum
- Species: C. glandulosum

Binomial name
- Clerodendrum glandulosum Lindl.

Synonyms
- Clerodendrum colebrookianum Walp.; Clerodendrum speciosissimum Schauer

= Clerodendrum glandulosum =

Species of flowering plant

Clerodendrum glandulosum (syn. Clerodendrum colebrookianum), commonly known as East Indian glory bower, is a perennial shrub belonging to the family Lamiaceae, but sometimes classified under Verbenaceae. It is one of the most well known among ~400 species of Clerodendrum, as it is widely used in traditional practices, such as for vegetable and treatments of diabetes, hypertension, cough and rheumatism.

The species is found in tropical and subtropical regions of Asia including India, Myanmar, Bangladesh, Malaysia, Indonesia, Thailand, Bhutan and Nepal; and also in temperate China. In India it is confined to the north-east region including West Bengal and Sikkim, and is classified under the threat status as vulnerable.

== Description ==
C. glandulosum is a flowering shrub or small tree, characterized by a foetid smell. It is erect reaches up to 1.5-3 m in height and is evergreen. Branchlets are usually 4-angled when young. Leaves are simple, opposite or rarely whorled. Leaf base is wedge- shaped to heart-shaped, margin entire to slightly wavy, tip long-pointed to pointed. Flowers are white and borne in 4-6-branched corymbose cymes, at the end of branches. Inflorescences loosely cymose or capitate, in terminal or rarely axillary paniculate thyrses. Calyx is campanulate or cup-shaped, densely pubescent. Corolla with a slender tube; lobes 5, spreading. Stamens 4, ovary 4-locular; ovules pendulous or laterally attached. Style with 2 acute stigmatic lobes. Fruit is a drupe with four 1-seeded pyrenes, sometimes separating into two 2-loculed or four 1-locular mericarps. It flowers during postmonsoon, from August to December.

== Chemical constituents ==
Major phytochemicals in the leaves of C. glandulosum are steroids, phenolics, terpenoids, flavonoids, tannin, glycosides and reducing sugars. Novel compounds are identified such as colebroside A (1), a diglucoside of fatty acid ester of glycerin. New steroids named colebrin A-E (1-5) are also identified. Two new C29 sterols, colebrin A and colebrin B, and clerosterol have also been isolated.

== Traditional medicine ==
It is a common medicinal plant used for rheumatic pains by the Khasi and Jaintia tribes of Meghalaya. It is believed that the smell of the wood relieves children from many diseases. Leaves and roots are used by Manipuri tribes for skin diseases, cough, and dysentery. The tribal natives of Arunachal Pradesh use the leaf juice mixed with garlic extract given in treating blood pressure or cooked leaf is taken for the same. Among the Mizo, leaves are cooked as vegetable. Locally known as 'Anphui / Phuihnam' is popularly used to control hypertension. Like their Mizo brethren, the Hmar, the Garos of Meghalaya and Kukis of Manipur, Assam, Meghalaya, Nagaland and Myanmar also used the leaves to control hypertension and as a vegetables and is known as 'Anphui' in their dialect. More often than not, is used extensively in the preparation of pork curry. It is a popular folk remedy for hypertension throughout north-eastern India.
