= Galo people =

Ethnic group in Arunachal Pradesh, Northeast India

Galo
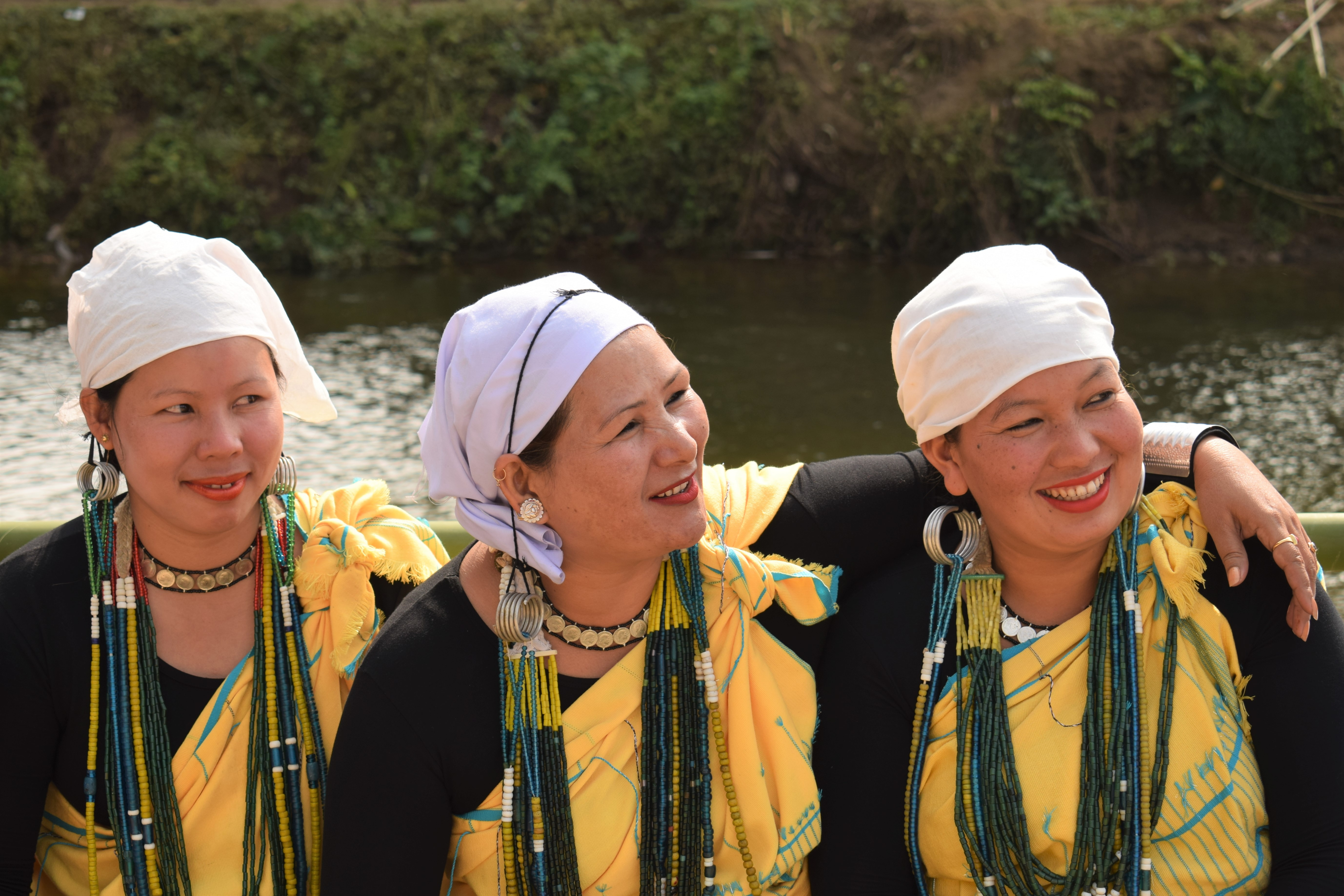
- Galo women in traditional dress

Regions with significant populations
- India
- Arunachal Pradesh: 144,440

Languages
- Tani

Religion
- Shamanic, Christianity

Related ethnic groups
- Tani

The Galo are a tribe in Arunachal Pradesh, India, who are descendants of Abotani. They speak the Tani Galo language. Other names which have been used to reference the Galo tribe in the past include Duba, Doba, Dobah Abor, Galo Abor, Galo, Galo Adi, Galong etc. The Galo have been listed as a scheduled tribe under the name Galo since 1950.

== Cuisine ==
The Galo utilize numerous ingredients, including rice, bamboo shoot, and foraged plants. Foraged ingredients are primarily gathered by women. Commonly foraged plants include Clerodendrum glandulosum (Oin), Diplazium esculenium (Taka), Elatostema sublaxum (Oji), Ganostegia hirta (Oyik), Litsea cubeba (Tair), Piper pedicellatum (Rar), and Solanum americanum (Or-re).

The most common cooking method is boiling with tender bamboo shoot; steaming, roasting, smoking, and fermenting are also popular. The most common steamed dish is chicken intestine, while smoking is often used with fish and meat in general. During festivals, it is common to cook rice (sometimes mixed with meat, fish, or wild plants) in bamboo tubes, which are cooked over a fire.

Bamboo shoot is prepared in multiple ways, including fermentation, grinding and drying. A common chutney is made from dried chili, roasted sesame, bamboo shoot, and dried fish.

The Galo usually eat three meals each day. Frequently, breakfast and lunch are rice, boiled potatoes, and boiled greens. Dinner also may add boiled fish.

== Folklore in relation to resource use and management ==
In Galo folklore, Turi or eri is the common ancestor of Tani (the first human-being and the ancestor of human-beings), Taki (the ancestor of spirits) and Tanyo [the ancestor of cat families which include Nyote (tiger), Nyopak-takar (leopard), Nyoke (Panther), Nyoli, Nyomuk, Nyoji (various species of wild cats)]. This folkloric relation signifies the harmonious relationship that the Galo society shares with other living and non-living forms.

One saying goes:

"tumsi nyomara lo, hottum elam go hore lelam go doma rem yobe nyine hage ha rem. Tumsi nyomra irga kama, isi opo kama rem mopin e irga kama. Sile boso gobo golak go goka kichin gatugo ao go kama rem nyiram re."

Translated as:

"O human! What worth is human life when forests without flora and fauna, rivers without fish"

Instead of assuming themselves as the 'possessor' of nature, their core world view of 'community of beings' places resource use and its management, apart from providing material sustenance, as a binding agent between human-nature relationship, human-human relationship and human-nature-supernatural relationship. Moreover, resources also act as a metaphysical medium to appease supernatural beings/spirits. Nature, according to Galo's worldview, has also unknown and destructive dimensions. Thus, periodic rituals with respect to land, water and forests becomes mandatory to pacify the anger of this incomprehensible element of nature, which manifests in the form of spirits.

The constant squabbling over the ownership of land between Tani (the mythical forefather of the Galos) and Taki (the spirit brother of Tani) led to division of ownership of resources: the domesticated ones (one owned by humankind) and the wild ones owned by ethereal beings/spirits. In order to resolve the conflict, Donyi Jilo, a respected priest, intervened and divided the land into momen (the domesticated one) and modir (vertical/land not suitable for human use). Moreover, he explicitly instructed both the beings not to intervene in each-other's land. However, the Galo people hold the notion that Taki's descendent groups namely, the Doje, Yapom, Pomte-Sarte and the Bute-Kamdu frequently trespasses onto momen inhabiting trees, streams, caves, rocks etc. And the way to honor them is to conduct rituals. One such ritual, Ampu Yolu, is observed in relation to protection of crops from pests and diseases. Through this ritual, the spirits/deities, namely Jeru Poru, Pote, Biro-mugli and Yapom are revered. In particular, village women perform the rite, amsep-misep, wherein a paste of amtir (rice powder) and opo (fermented rice) is tied to bamboo sticks and placed randomly in jhum fields. This helps to attract pests. Moreover, it is considered a boon for good harvest.

Another ritual, dir-tachi, is observed in case of excessive pest infestation. In the past, according to Galo's wisdom, Tachi was mainly responsible for the famine in the region. Etymologically, dir also signifies famine. The ritual involves tiny packets of edible grains and vegetables in combination with an egg, fowl or a pig, which is offered to the spirit, Uyis. After the ritual, effigies of Uyis, made of bamboo leaves along with other offerings are placed in a bamboo raft (Galo: hipe) and immersed in the river.

In relation to famine, the Galo's myth goes like this: Diyi Tami, daughter of Mopin and the first wife of Abo Tani, leaves for Digo Pine (the land of Mopin). In her absence, Rosi Tami, daughter of Dir (the famine) and the second wife of Abo Tani, mistakenly puts two grains in a magical pot. In normal circumstances, one grain would be sufficient to prepare enough food for the whole family. Putting two grains result in surplus food. Not knowing what to do, she asks Diro-Kibo (dog of famine) to consume the excess rice. Along with consuming the excess rice, he also consumes the magical power of the pot. Thus, the magical pot loses its inherent capacity to produce huge quantity of rice with a single grain. Subsequently, it led to famine in the region. In order to address the food-shortage, Abo Tani, following the order of Diyi Tami, drowns Rosi Tami in the river and kills Diro-Kibo.

== Notable people ==
- Binny Yanga, Social Worker
- Tomo Riba, Politician
- Eken Riba, Politician
- Anthony Doke, Insurgent Military Commander in Chief

== See also ==
- Marriage in Galo culture
- List of people of Tani descent

== Bibliography ==
- Nyori, Tai (1993). History and Culture of the Adis, Omsons Publications, New Delhi-110 027.
- Post, Mark W. (2007). A Grammar of Galo. PhD Dissertation. Melbourne, La Trobe University Research Centre for Linguistic Typology.
- Riba, Bomchak. (2009). Relevance of Indigenous Knowledge System of the Galo of Arunachal Pradesh in Sustainable Development of Forest Resources. Ph.D. Thesis, Rajiv Gandhi University, Arunachal Pradesh, India.
- Basar, Jumyir. (2014). INDIGENOUS KNOWLEDGE and RESOURCE MANAGEMENT (Perspectives of a Tribe in Northeast India), Anshah Publishing House, New Delhi-110002
