= Tani languages =

Language family found in Northeast India

Tani
- Miric
- Geographic distribution: Arunachal Pradesh and Assam
- Ethnicity: Tani peoples
- Linguistic classification: Sino-Tibetan: Tani
- Subdivisions: Eastern (Adi and Mising); Western (Apatani, Galo, Nishi and Tagin)

Language codes
- Glottolog: tani1259

The Tani languages encompass a group of closely related Sino-Tibetan languages spoken by the Tani peoples in northeastern India, primarily in Arunachal Pradesh and Assam. These languages belong to the Sino-Tibetan family and include several major dialects such as in Mising, Galo, Apatani, Adi, Tagin, and Nyishi.

== Background ==
The Tani languages are spoken by about 2,170,500 people of Arunachal Pradesh, including the Adi, Apatani, Galo, Mising, Nyishi, Tagin, and of the East Kameng, West Kameng, Papumpare, Lower Subansiri, Upper Subansiri, West Siang, East Siang, Upper Siang, Lower Dibang Valley and Lohit districts of Arunachal Pradesh and Dhemaji, North Lakhimpur, Sonitpur, Majuli etc. districts of Assam. In Arunachal Pradesh alone the Tani-speaking area covers some 40,000 square kilometers, or roughly half the size of the state. Scattered Tani communities spill over the Sino-Indian border into adjacent areas in Mêdog (Miguba people), Mainling (Bokar and Tagin peoples), and Lhünzê (Bangni, Na, Bayi, Dazu, and Mara peoples) counties of Tibet.

The name Tani was originally suggested by Jackson Tianshin Sun in his 1993 doctoral dissertation.

== Classification ==
The Tani languages are conservatively classified as a distinct branch in Sino-Tibetan. Their closest relatives may be their eastern neighbors the Digaro languages, Taraon and Idu; this was first suggested by Sun (1993), but a relationship has not yet been systematically demonstrated. Blench (2014) suggests that Tani has a Greater Siangic substratum, with the Greater Siangic languages being a non-Sino-Tibetan language family consisting of Idu-Taraon and Siangic languages.

Mark Post (2015) observes that Tani typologically fits into the Mainland Southeast Asia linguistic area, which typically has creoloid morphosyntactic patterns, rather than with the languages of the Tibetosphere. Post (2015) also notes that Tani culture is similar to those of Mainland Southeast Asian hill tribe cultures, and is not particularly adapted to cold montane environments.

A provisional classification in Sun (1993), who argued that Tani is a primary branch of Tibeto-Burman (within Sino-Tibetan), is:

- Tani
  - Eastern Tani (Adi/Abor)
    - ?Damu
    - Bori
    - Mising (aka Plains Miri) – Padam (Bor Abor) – Minyong
    - Bokar (incl. Palibo & Ramo)
  - Western Tani
    - Apatani (aka Tani)
    - Nishi
      - Nishi (aka E. Dafla, Nishing; possibly including Nyisu, Yano), Tagin (aka W. Dafla), Bangni (aka Na), Hill Miri (aka Sarak), ?Gallong (aka Duba, Galo)

To Eastern Tani, van Driem (2008) adds the following possible languages:

Tangam

Milang has traditionally been classified as a divergent Tani language, but in 2011 was tentatively reclassified as Siangic (Post & Blench 2011).

Proto-Tani was partially reconstructed by Sun (1993). A large number of reconstructed roots have cognates in other Sino-Tibetan languages. However, a great deal of Proto-Tani vocabulary have no cognates within Sino-Tibetan (Post 2011), and most Tani grammar seems to be secondary, without cognates in grammatically conservative Sino-Tibetan languages such as Jingpho or the Kiranti languages (Post 2006). Post (2012) suggests that Apatani and Milang have non-Tani substrata, and that as early Tani languages had expanded deeper into Arunachal Pradesh, mixing with non-Tani languages occurred.

Mark Post (2013) proposes the following revised classification for the Tani languages.

- Tani
  - ?Milang
  - Eastern Tani
    - Bori
    - Siang (Adi)
      - Minyong
      - Mising
      - Pasi
      - Padam
      - Bokar
  - Pre-Western Tani
    - Tangam, Damu?
    - Western Tani
      - Apatani
      - Subansiri
        - Bangni-Tagin
        - Nyishi–Hill Miri
        - Galo
          - Lare
          - Pugo

The undocumented Ashing language presumably belongs here.

However, Macario (2015) notes that many Apatani words are closer to reconstructions of Proto-Tibeto-Burman (Matisoff 2003) than to Proto-Tani (Sun 1993). Possible explanations include Apatani having a substratum belonging to an extinct Tibeto-Burman branch or language phylum, or linguistic variation in Proto-Tani.

== Isoglosses ==
Sun (1993: 254–255) lists the following 25 lexical isoglosses between Western Tani and Eastern Tani.

| Gloss | Proto-Western Tani | Proto-Eastern Tani |
|---|---|---|
| urine | *sum | *si |
| blind | *mik-čiŋ | *mik-maŋ |
| mouth | *gam | *nap-paŋ |
| nose | *ñV-pum | *ñV-buŋ |
| wind (n.) | *rji | *sar |
| rain (n.) | *mV-doŋ | *pV-doŋ |
| thunder | *doŋ-gum | *doŋ-mɯr |
| lightning | *doŋ-rjak | *ja-ri |
| fish | *ŋo-i | *a-ŋo |
| tiger | *paŋ-tə | *mjo/mro |
| root | *m(j)a | *pɯr |
| old man | *mi-kam | *mi-ǰiŋ |
| village | *nam-pom | *duŋ-luŋ |
| granary | *nam-suŋ | *kjum-suŋ |
| year | *ñiŋ | *tak |
| sell | *pruk | *ko |
| breath | *sak | *ŋa |
| ferry/cross | *rap | *koŋ |
| arrive | *-ki | *pɯŋ |
| say/speak | *ban±man | *lu |
| rich | *mi-tə~mi-ta | *mi-rem |
| soft | *ñi-mjak | *rə-mjak |
| drunk | *kjum | – |
| back (adv.) | *-kur | *lat² |
| ten | *čam | *rjɯŋ |

== Tani Language Foundation ==
The Tani Language Foundation (TLF) is a non-profit organization dedicated to preserving and revitalizing the linguistic and cultural heritage of the Tani people, an indigenous group primarily residing in Arunachal Pradesh and Assam, India. Established by a group of college students of Tani ethnicity, TLF focuses on unifying the various dialects of the Tani languages and ensuring their continued relevance in contemporary society.

Founded by Luke Rimmo (Mingkeng) Lego and Takar Mili, TLF focuses on preserving the various dialects of the Tani languages and ensuring their continued relevance in contemporary society.

== Proto-Tani ==
Consonants
| | Labial | Alveolar | (Alveolo-) Palatal | Velar | Glottal |
|---|---|---|---|---|---|
| Nasal | m | n | ɲ | ŋ | (ˀ) |
| Stop | p, b | t, d | t͡ɕ, d͡ʑ | k, g | |
| Fricative | f, v | | ɕ, ʑ | | h, ɦ |
| Approximant | | r | j | | |
| Lateral | | l | | | |

Vowels
| Height | Front | Central | Back |
|---|---|---|---|
| Close | i | ɨ | u |
| Mid | e | ə | o |
| Open | | a | |

While several of its daughter languages are tonal, Proto Tani most likely did not have tone.

=== Syllable structure ===
The Proto Tani syllable structure is (C_{i})(G)V(X)

1. C_{i} is an optional initial consonant
2. G is an optional approximant
3. V is the vowel
4. X is an optional coda, either a nucleus identical V, or a final consonant
  1. Syllables with an X are heavy, while syllables without one are light

== See also ==
- Siangic languages
- Greater Siangic languages
