= Bori language =

Tani language spoken in India

Bori
- Bori-Karko
- Region: Arunachal Pradesh
- Language family: Sino-Tibetan: Tani; Eastern; Bori
- Dialects: Karko; Komkar; Pasi; Shimong

Language codes
- ISO 639-3: (included under Adi adi)
- Glottolog: bori1243
- ELP: Bori
- Bori is classified as Definitely Endangered by the UNESCO Atlas of the World's Languages in Danger.

Bori is a Tani language of India. Bori is spoken in Payum Circle, West Siang District, Arunachal Pradesh (Megu 1988).

Bori is spoken by the Bori, an indigenous tribal people of India.

Post (2013) and Ethnologue classify Karko as a variety of Bori.

== Phonology ==
Megu (1988) defines the consonant and vowel inventories as follows:

Consonants
		Labial	Dental/ Alveolar	Palatal	Velar/ Glottal
Plosive	Voiceless	p	t	c	k
Plosive	Voiced	b	d		g
Fricative			s		h
Nasal		m	n	ɲ ⟨ny⟩	ŋ ⟨ng⟩
Trill			r~ɹ ⟨r⟩		
Approximant			r~ɹ ⟨r⟩	j ⟨y⟩	
Lateral			l		

Vowels
	Front	Central	Back
Close	i	ɨ	u
Close-mid	e	ə	
Open-mid			ɔ
Open	a, aː		

== Grammar ==
Plurality is expressed by adding the auxiliary kídíng after the noun. Nouns have no inherent gender, but animals of a specific sex can be marked by two grammatical genders: masculine and feminine. The masculine is marked by the -bo suffix and the feminine is marked by the -né suffix. The word order is SOV.

Four cases are marked by a suffix on the noun. These are the locative, accusative, instrumental, and dative. The habitual aspect is marked by -do and the continuous aspect is marked by -dung. -la and -toka are imperative suffixes. -la can also be used for the interrogative.

Personal pronouns denote three persons and two numbers.

Person	Singular	Plural
1	ngo	ngolu
2	no	nolu
3	bí	bulu

== Sources ==
- Megu, Arak. 1993. The Karkos and Their Language. Itanagar: Directorate of Research, Government of Arunachal Pradesh.
