= Pakke-Kessang =

Village in Arunachal Pradesh, India

Coordinates: 27.159°N 93.220°E

Pakke Kessang is a town in the Indian state of Arunachal Pradesh. It is located in Pakke-Kessang district, which has been carved out of the East Kameng district along with five administrative units, namely Pakke Kessang, Seijosa, Pijerang, Passa Valley, and Dissing-Passo with district headquarters at Lemmi.

It is located 60 km south east of the East Kameng district and is 130 km north west of the State capital, Itanagar. Two circuits approved by Arunachal Tourism, namely the Doimukh-Sagalee-Pakke Kessang-Seppa circuit and the Tezpur-Seijosa(Pakke)-Bhalukpong-Tipi circuit also runs within this area. Pakke-Kessang is one of the 60 constituencies of the Legislative Assembly of Arunachal Pradesh.

Pakke-Kessang consists of 110 villages and 28 panchayats. Naharlagun railway station is the nearest, being 115 km away from Pakke-Kessang district. Pakke Kessang is home to three different tribes of Arunachal Pradesh, namely the Nyishi, Galo and Puroiks. The famous Pakke Tigers Reserve, the only Hornbill sanctuary in India, and the ancient ruins of Naksha Parbat falls within this region.

== See also ==
- List of constituencies of Arunachal Pradesh Legislative Assembly
- Arunachal Pradesh Legislative Assembly
