= Apatani language =

Tani language of India

Apatani
- tanw
- Native to: India
- Region: Arunachal Pradesh
- Ethnicity: Apatani people
- Native speakers: 44,815 (2011 census)
- Language family: Sino-Tibetan: Tani; Western Tani; Apatani

Language codes
- ISO 639-3: apt
- Glottolog: apat1240
- ELP: Apatani

Apatani (Apa Tani, Tanw) is a Tani language, a branch of the Sino-Tibetan languages, spoken in India.

== Classification ==
Post & Kanno (2013) and Macario (2015) notes that Apatani has various words that do not reconstruct to Proto-Tani, pointing to a possible non-Tani substratum in Apatani. Macario (2015) lists the following divergent Apatani forms that do not reconstruct to Proto-Tani.

Apatani	Proto-Tani	Proto-Tibeto-Burman	Gloss
puulye	*ge	*buw, *giian	clothes
la-	*han	*graŋ	cold (water)
mɨ-	*ryɨ	*day	do
sar-	*put	-	foam
poteʔ	*brɨŋ	*brɨŋ	full
ʔude	*nam	*kyim	house
-lya	*grəŋ	-	lean against
sar-se	*yak	-	foxtail millet
-ɟii	*ɦo-pran	-	orphan
huʔ-	*dan	*tur	shake
-ko	*təŋ	*twiy	short
-be	*pam	*kyam, *wal	snow
dàa-cáñ	*ryok	*syam	iron
yo (o)	*dɨn	*sya	meat
heñ-	*mɨŋ	*səm	think

== Geographical distribution ==
In Lower Subansiri district, Arunachal Pradesh, Apatani is spoken in 7 villages in Ziro valley, namely Hong, Hari, Biilla, Dutta, Hija, Mudang-Tage, and Bamin Michi (Ethnologue).

== Phonology ==
=== Consonants ===
		Labial	Alveolar	Palatal	Velar	Glottal
Nasal		m	n	ɲ	ŋ	
Plosive/ Affricate	voiceless	p	t	tʃ	k	ʔ
Plosive/ Affricate	voiced	b	d	dʒ	ɡ	
Fricative			s		x	h
Rhotic			r			
Approximant			l	j		

=== Vowels ===
	Front	Central	Back
Close	i	ɨ	u
Mid	e	ə	o
Open		a	

== Writing system ==
Like many endangered languages, Apatani did not have a standardized orthography until recently, and there was some debate among the Apatanis on which script should be used to transcribe it. In view of this, Tanw Supuñ Dukuñ, the apex Tanii organization, recommended the constitution of the Apatani Language Development Committee (ALDC). The Apatani Cultural and Literary Society (ACLS) constituted the ALDC to recommend a writing system of the language. A year-long discussion and study by ALDC resulted in the recommendation of an alphabet based on Roman script. The recommendation was accepted by the ACLS and the administrative approval for its use was given by the Tanw Supuñ Dukuñ, or the Apatani Apex Council.

=== Apatani (Tanii) Language Development ===
Apatani people have been writing Apatani using the Roman alphabet via an English-inspired orthography. What began as a practical means to communicate through writing has now grown into a writing system that has emerged as a means of intergroup communication. Currently, there are initiatives with regard to strengthening the status of the Apatani language in India. The most relevant ones are a revision project by Popi Sarmin Society and LivingDictionaries' Talking Apatani Dictionary. However, these developments signal a positive momentum to raise public awareness regarding the need for Tanii language development and preservation.
