= Bangni-Tagin language =

Sino-Tibetan language spoken in India

Bangni-Tagin
- Native to: India, China
- Region: Arunachal Pradesh , Tibet
- Native speakers: 62,897 (2011 census)
- Language family: Sino-Tibetan: Tani; Western Tani; Subansiri; Bangni-Tagin
- Dialects: Tagin; Bangni (incl. Na)

Language codes
- ISO 639-3: Variously: tgj – Tagin nbt – Na njz – Nyishi (partial: Bangni dialect)
- Glottolog: tagi1241 Tagin naaa1245 Na bang1338 Bangni, docked to retired code
- Bangni and Tagin are both classified as Vulnerable by the UNESCO Atlas of the World's Languages in Danger.

Tagin (Tagen), also known as West Dafla and Bangni (incl. Na) is a Sino-Tibetan language spoken in India.

Stuart Blackburn states that the 350 speakers of Mra have "always been, wrongly, subsumed under the administrative label of Tagin." It is not clear whether Mra is therefore a distinct dialect of Bangni-Tagin, or a different Tani language altogether.
