= Mainling =

Mainling 米林市 • སྨན་གླིང་གྲོང་ཁྱེར།
- County-level city
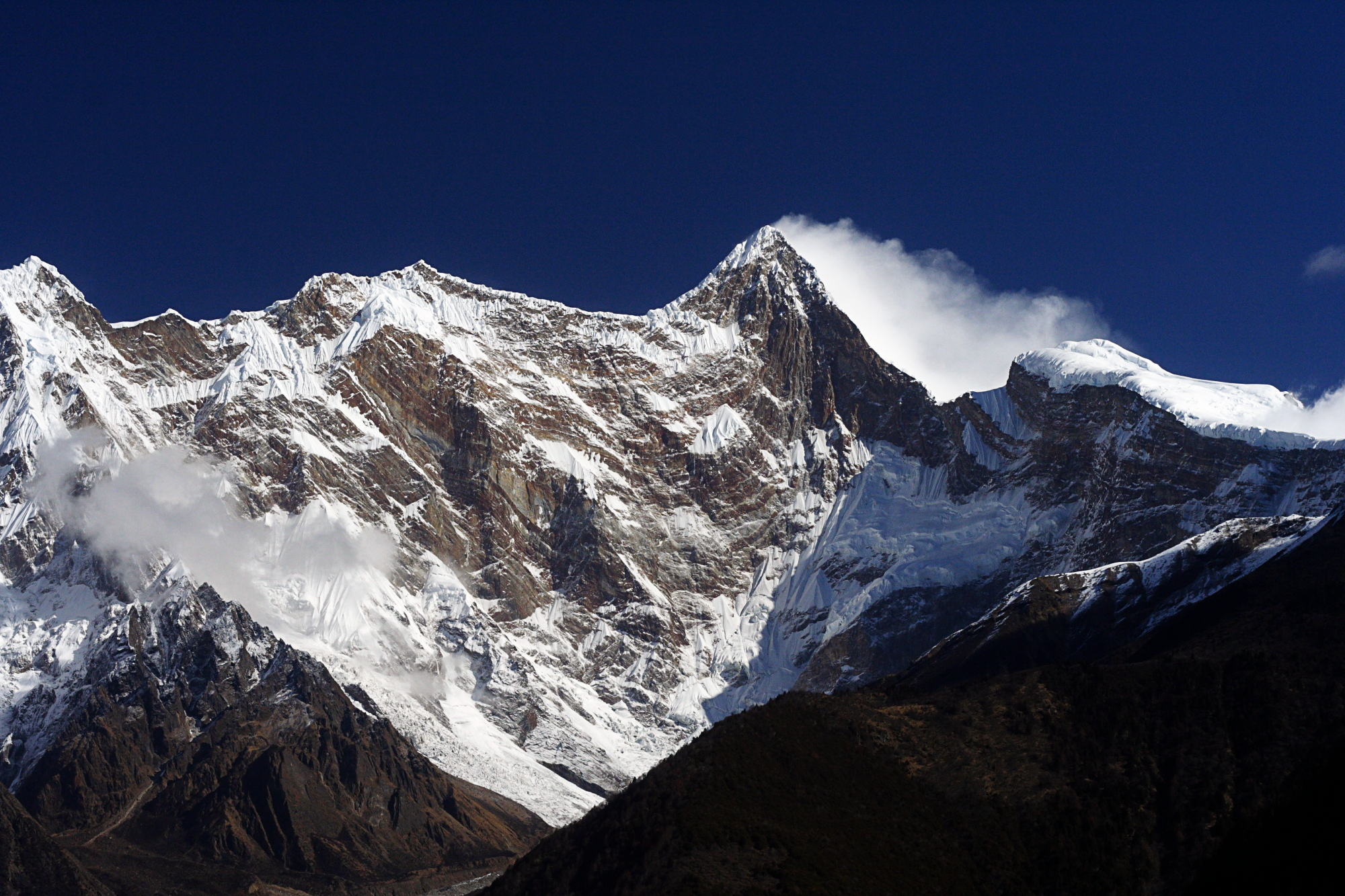
- Western slope of Namcha Barwa, captured from Naibai Observation Deck, Mainling City

- Location of the seat in the Tibet Autonomous Region Mainling (China)
- Coordinates: 29°36′00.00″N 94°12′07.20″E
- Country: China
- Autonomous region: Tibet
- Prefecture-level city: Nyingchi
- Municipal seat: Mainling

Area
  - Total: 9,490 km^{2} (3,660 sq mi)

Population (2020)
  - Total: 26,176
  - Density: 2.76/km^{2} (7.14/sq mi)
- Time zone: UTC+8 (China Standard)
- Website: www.milin.gov.cn

Mainling

Chinese name
- Chinese: 米林市
Transcriptions
Standard Mandarin
- Hanyu Pinyin: Mǐlín Shì

Tibetan name
- Tibetan: སྨན་གླིང་གྲོང་ཁྱེར།
Transcriptions
- Wylie: sman gling grong khyer
- Tibetan Pinyin: Mainling Chongkyêr

Mainling (Tibetan: སྨན་གླིང་གྲོང་ཁྱེར།; Chinese: 米林市; pinyin: Mǐlín), formerly Mainling County, is a county-level city under the jurisdiction of the prefecture-level city of Nyingchi in eastern Tibet Autonomous Region, China.

== Geography ==
Mainling is located in the central-west of the Nyingtri Prefecture, at the middle reaches of the Yarlung Tsangpo River, and between the Nyenchen Tanglha Mountains and the Himalayan Mountains. It de jure covers an area of 9,490 square kilometres, including the area claimed but de facto under control of the Arunachal Pradesh, India. The average altitude is 3,700 metres above sea level.

== Climate ==
Climate data for Mainling, elevation 2,950 m (9,680 ft), (1991–2020 normals, extremes 1981–2010)
Month	Jan	Feb	Mar	Apr	May	Jun	Jul	Aug	Sep	Oct	Nov	Dec	Year
Record high °C (°F)	19.1 (66.4)	19.4 (66.9)	22.3 (72.1)	24.1 (75.4)	25.8 (78.4)	27.9 (82.2)	29.7 (85.5)	27.8 (82.0)	27.9 (82.2)	24.6 (76.3)	19.1 (66.4)	16.7 (62.1)	29.7 (85.5)
Mean daily maximum °C (°F)	8.1 (46.6)	9.5 (49.1)	12.3 (54.1)	15.6 (60.1)	18.4 (65.1)	21.0 (69.8)	22.3 (72.1)	22.3 (72.1)	20.5 (68.9)	16.7 (62.1)	13.4 (56.1)	9.9 (49.8)	15.8 (60.5)
Daily mean °C (°F)	0.5 (32.9)	2.6 (36.7)	5.6 (42.1)	8.6 (47.5)	11.7 (53.1)	15.1 (59.2)	16.3 (61.3)	16.1 (61.0)	14.3 (57.7)	10.1 (50.2)	5.3 (41.5)	1.6 (34.9)	9.0 (48.2)
Mean daily minimum °C (°F)	−4.9 (23.2)	−2.1 (28.2)	1.1 (34.0)	4.0 (39.2)	7.3 (45.1)	11.2 (52.2)	12.5 (54.5)	12.1 (53.8)	10.5 (50.9)	5.9 (42.6)	−0.3 (31.5)	−4.2 (24.4)	4.4 (40.0)
Record low °C (°F)	−15.8 (3.6)	−12.1 (10.2)	−9.4 (15.1)	−6.0 (21.2)	−2.4 (27.7)	2.1 (35.8)	6.1 (43.0)	4.4 (39.9)	0.5 (32.9)	−6.9 (19.6)	−10.0 (14.0)	−14.5 (5.9)	−15.8 (3.6)
Average precipitation mm (inches)	4.8 (0.19)	10.9 (0.43)	31.4 (1.24)	57.0 (2.24)	85.7 (3.37)	121.0 (4.76)	143.4 (5.65)	116.4 (4.58)	84.5 (3.33)	39.1 (1.54)	4.6 (0.18)	2.6 (0.10)	701.4 (27.61)
Average precipitation days (≥ 0.1 mm)	4.8	8.3	14.8	19.4	21.3	23.3	24.1	22.3	19.8	14.8	4.1	2.4	179.4
Average snowy days	11.0	13.4	7.9	1.0	0	0	0	0	0	0.1	1.9	6.6	41.9
Average relative humidity (%)	60	63	66	69	71	75	77	75	76	70	62	60	69
Mean monthly sunshine hours	159.4	126.8	134.8	133.5	130.5	104.4	114.3	124.9	113.3	138.9	168.3	178.8	1,627.9
Percentage possible sunshine	49	40	36	34	31	25	27	31	31	40	53	56	38
Source: China Meteorological Administration

== Economy ==
The mine resources of the city are gold dust, plaster, limestone, chromium and iron, etc.

The main economy style in Mainling is farming and forest industry. The main species of the trees are fir, spruce, pine, oak, and cypress, etc. The total cumulation volume of woods is 40 million cubic metres. The special fruit productions are apples, apple pears, walnuts and peaches.

Nyingchi Mainling Airport is located in Mainling.

== Demography ==
In 1999 the city had a population of 17347 inhabitants.

The city is home to the Lhoba people.

== Administrative divisions ==
Mainling contains 3 towns, 4 townships, and 1 ethnic township.

Name	Chinese	Hanyu Pinyin	Tibetan	Wylie
Towns
Mainling Town	米林镇	Mǐlín zhèn	སྨན་གླིང་གྲོང་རྡལ།	sman gling grong rdal
Pé Town	派镇	Pài zhèn	ཕད་གྲོང་རྡལ།	phad grong rdal
Orong Town	卧龙镇	Wòlóng zhèn	ཨོ་རོང་གྲོང་རྡལ།	o rong grong rdal
Townships
Tamnyen Township	丹娘乡	Dānniáng xiāng	གཏམ་སྙན་ཤང་།	gtan snyan shang
Tashi Rabten Township	扎西绕登乡	Zhāxīràodēng xiāng	བཀྲིས་རབ་བརྟན་ཤང་།	bkra shis rab brtan shang
Nelung Township	里龙乡	Lǐlóng xiāng	གནས་ལུང་ཤང་།	gnas lung shang
Chanak Township	羌纳乡	Qiāngnà xiāng	ཆ་ནག་ཤང་།	chu nag shang
Ethnic township
Naiyü Lhoba Ethnic Township	南伊珞巴族乡	Nányī Luòbāzú xiāng	གནས་ཡུལ་ལྷོ་པ་མི་རིགས་ཤང་།	gnas yul lho pa mi rigs shang
* includes areas claimed but currently under control of the Indian state of Arunachal Pradesh.

=== Villages ===
- Zhongsa Village (Danniang Township)
