= Nishi language =

Language of India

Nyishi
- Nyishi, Nisi, Nishing
- Native to: India
- Region: Arunachal Pradesh, Assam
- Ethnicity: Nyishi people
- Native speakers: 280,000 (2011 census)
- Language family: Sino-Tibetan: Tibeto-Burman; Tani; Western Tani; Nyishi
- Dialects: Akang, Aya, Leil, Aka, Bangni, Nishang
- Writing system: Latin (Nishi alphabet); Devanagari

Language codes
- ISO 639-3: njz
- Glottolog: nyis1236
- Nishi is classified as Vulnerable by the UNESCO Atlas of the World's Languages in Danger.

Nishi (also known as Nyishi, Nisi, Nishang, Nissi, Nyising, Leil, Aya, Akang, Bangni-Bangru, Solung) is a Sino-Tibetan language of the Tani branch spoken in Papum Pare, Lower Subansiri, Kurung Kumey, Kra Daadi, East Kameng, Pakke Kesang, Kamle districts of Arunachal Pradesh and Darrang District of Assam in India. According to the 2011 census of India, the population of the Nishi speakers is approximately 280,000. Though there are plenty of variations across regions, the dialects of Nishi, such as Akang, Aya, Nyishi (raga), Tagin are easily mutually intelligible, with the exception of the rather small in population Bangni-Bangru and Solung Dialects being very different from the former. 'Nisi' is sometimes used as a cover term for western Tani languages.

Nishi is a subject–object–verb language.

== Origin ==
The main origin of this language has been pointed out by George Abraham Grierson as 'Dafla'. He included different varieties under a common name which is known as North Assam group. The varieties are Dafla, Miri and Abor according to him. Daflas used to denote them as 'Nyi-Shi'. these tribes inhabited between the Assam Valley and Tibet. Then they started to spread in Lakhimpur, Sibsagar and Darrang Districts of Assam. Mr. William Robinson in his notes mentioned that Daflas were spread over a region from 92°50' to 94° north latitude.

The word nyishi itself means "upland man", and is a compound of nyi ("man") and shi ("highland").

They are probably descendants of peoples who separated from Khasi 4,200 years ago.

== Phonology ==
Nishi is a tonal language that utilizes three tones: rising, neutral, and falling. These can be applied to all of its vowels, and often can change the word's meaning:

bénam – "to hold"
benam – "to deliver"
bènam – "to vomit"

Vowels
	Front	Central	Back
High	i	ɨ	u
Mid	e	ə	o
Low		a	

These are the consonants of Nyishi. Where the orthography differs from the IPA, the orthography is bolded. Velar fricative [x] appears in less than ten words in Abraham's vocabulary list, and is regarded as questionably phonemic.

		Bilabial	Alveolar	Palatal	Velar	Glottal
Nasal		m	n	ɲ ⟨ny⟩	ŋ ⟨ng⟩	
Stop	voiceless	p	t	c	k	
Stop	voiced	b	d	ɟ ⟨j⟩	g	
Fricative			s		x ⟨kh⟩	h
Approximant			l	j ⟨y⟩		
Tap			ɾ ⟨r⟩			

== Grammar ==
Nyishi distinguishes between number, person, and case. It does not have a gender system, but special affixes can be added to nouns to denote gender.

=== Pronouns ===
Personal Pronouns
Person	Singular	Dual	Plural
1st	ŋo	ŋuiɲ	ŋul
2nd	no	nuiɲ	nul
3rd	mɨ	buiɲ	bul

== Vocabulary ==
=== Numerals ===
English	Romanization	Nyishi
One	akin, aking	akin
Two	anyi, enyi	aɲiə
Three	om	oum
Four	api	
Five	ang, ango,angu	aŋ(o)

The counting system differs when referring to human vs. non-human objects.
