= Nyishi people =

Ethnic group in Arunachal Pradesh, India

Nyishi
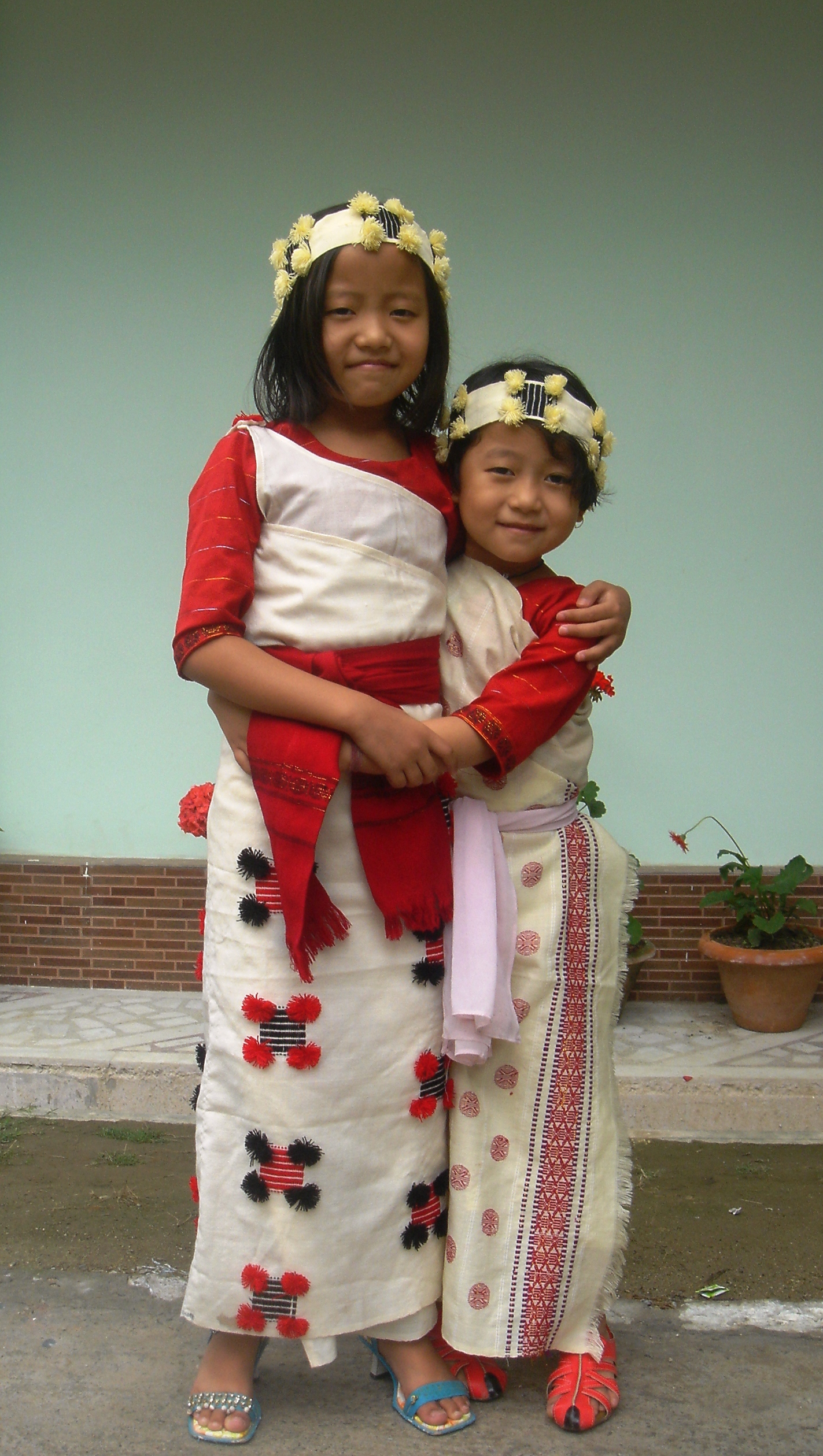
- Two girls of the Nyishi tribe

Total population
- 249,824 (2011 census)

Regions with significant populations
- India (Arunachal Pradesh)

Languages
- Tani

Religion
- mainly Christian (63%), followed by Hinduism, and Donyi-Polo.

Related ethnic groups
- Mising people, Tagin people, Galo people, Tibetan people

The Nyishi people are a dominant ethnic group in Arunachal Pradesh, in northeastern India. They speak a Tani language known as the Nishi language. Their population of around 300,000 makes them the most populous tribe of Arunachal Pradesh, closely followed by the tribes of the Adi according to 2001 census.

Polygyny is prevalent among the Nyishi. It signifies one's social status and economic stability and also proves useful during hard times like clan wars or social hunting and various other social activities. This practice, however, is diminishing especially with modernization and the spread of Christianity. They trace their descent patrilineally and are divided into several clans.

== Origin ==
As per the Nyshi mythology, there were many versions of Abo Tanyi in the form of spirits and other beings. Nyiha (Niya) is one of the sons of Abo Tanyi, which is the first perfect human being, and the Nyishi are his descendants.

== Etymology ==
In Nyishi, Nyi refers to "a human" and the word shi denotes "here, this or being", thereby Nyishi means human being or this human. The Nyishis are mentioned as the Dafla people in the contemporary Ahom documents and consequently, the British documents and historians of the post-independence period also used the same term. The Nyishi are geographically concentrated around the Dafla Hill range, located in the northern part of the Papum Pare district. Previously, they were referred to as Dafla, a term replaced by "Nyishi" through the Constitution (Scheduled Tribes) Order (Amendment) Act of 2008.

== Distributions ==
They are spread across eight districts of Arunachal Pradesh: Kra Daadi, Kurung Kumey, East Kameng, West Kameng, Papum Pare, Keyi Panyor, parts of Lower Subansiri, Kamle, and Pakke Kessang district and some parts of Upper subansiri District. The Kurung Kumey and Kra Daadi districts have the largest concentration of Nyishi population. The Nyishis also live in the Sonitpur and North Lakhimpur districts of Assam.

== Religion ==
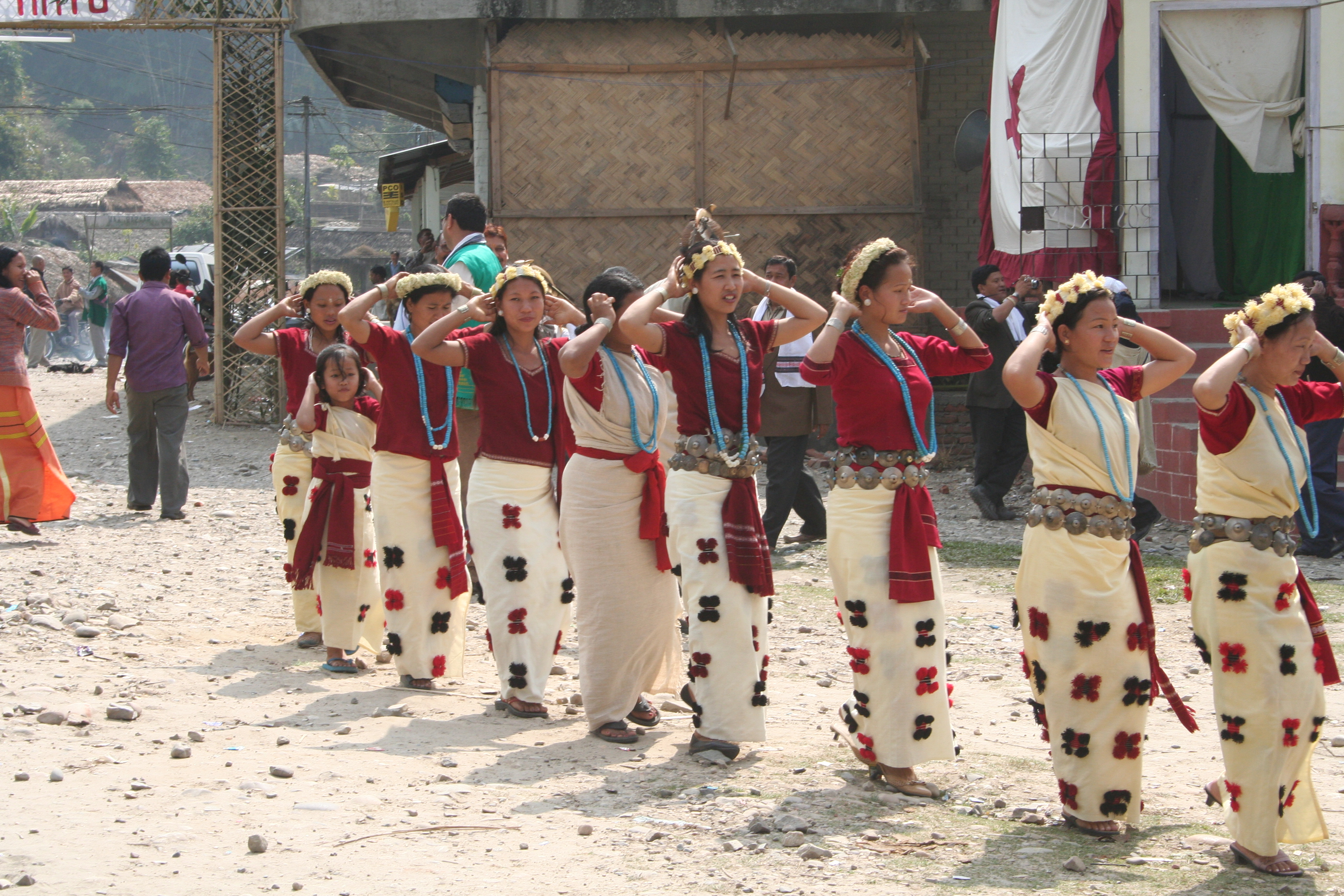
A festival of the Nyishi tribe of Arunachal Pradesh, India.

Nyokum, Boori-Boot, and Longte are the festivals celebrated by the Nyishi people, which commemorates their ancestors.

As per the Donyi Polo, the Nyishi believes that everything in nature has owner (spirit or uyu, wiyu). The priest (Nyubh) acts as the translator/mediator/negotiator between the human and the spirit and performs rituals and animals sacrifices to please the spirits. The spirits may be benevolent or malevolent.

Christian missionaries began operating in Arunachal Pradesh in the 1950s; however, many of their proselytising activities were limited by the government until the 1970s. According to a 2011 survey, many of the Nyishi people have become Christian (31%), followed by Hinduism (29%), with many of the remaining still following the ancient indigenous Donyi-Polo.

Recently tiny amount of Nyishi become Muslim; and wanted to create an organisation which safeguard the interest of tribal Muslims in Arunachal but it is self dissolved due to pressure by local organisations, those claim that "organisation is created to safeguard Bangladesh is in Arunachal from natives". After this reaction, the leading person of tribal Muslims decided to dissolve it because it may cause disruption in social harmony.

== The Hornbill issue ==
The Nyishis, who traditionally wear cane helmets surmounted by the crest of a hornbill beak (known as pudum or padam), have considerably affected the population of this bird.

Hornbill Nest Adoption Program(HNAB) has been going on since 2011, which is a community led conservation initiative through which local tribal villagers protect nest trees of hornbills in forests around villages on the fringe of the Pakke Tiger Reserve. The hunters from Nyishi tribe are now protectors who try to save the hornbill population, due to which hornbill populations have been doing well inside the protected area.

== Notable people ==
- Nabam Tuki, former Chief minister of Arunachal Pradesh
- Kameng Dolo, former Deputy Chief minister of Arunachal Pradesh

== See also ==
- List of people of Tani descent
