= Demographics of Arunachal Pradesh =

Historical population
Year	Pop.	±%
1961	337,000	—
1971	468,000	+38.9%
1981	632,000	+35.0%
1991	865,000	+36.9%
2001	1,098,000	+26.9%
2011	1,484,000	+35.2%
First ever census was carried out in 1961. Source: Census of India

The Indian state of Arunachal Pradesh has a total population of roughly 1.4 million (as of 2011) on an area of 84,000 km^{2}, amounting to a population density of about 17 pop./km^{2} (far below the Indian average of 370 pop./km^{2} but significantly higher than similarly mountainous Ladakh). The "indigenous groups" account for about two thirds of population, while immigrants, mostly of Bengali/Hindi belt origin, account for the remaining third.

== List of tribes ==
The Scheduled Castes and Scheduled Tribes Lists (Modification) Order (1956 and as inserted by Act 69 of 1986) lists twelve tribes of Arunachal Pradesh explicitly, but makes explicit that the list is non-exhaustive by noting that "all tribes of the State, including" those listed are to be considered "Scheduled". There are 26 major tribes and more than 100 sub tribes in Arunachal Pradesh. The twelve tribes listed are: Adi (Abor), Aka (Hruso), Apatani, Nyishi, Tagin, Galo, Khampti, Mishmi, Monpa, "any Naga tribes", Sherdukpen, Singpho.

By ethnolinguistic classification:

- Tibeto-Burman
  - Bodic Languages
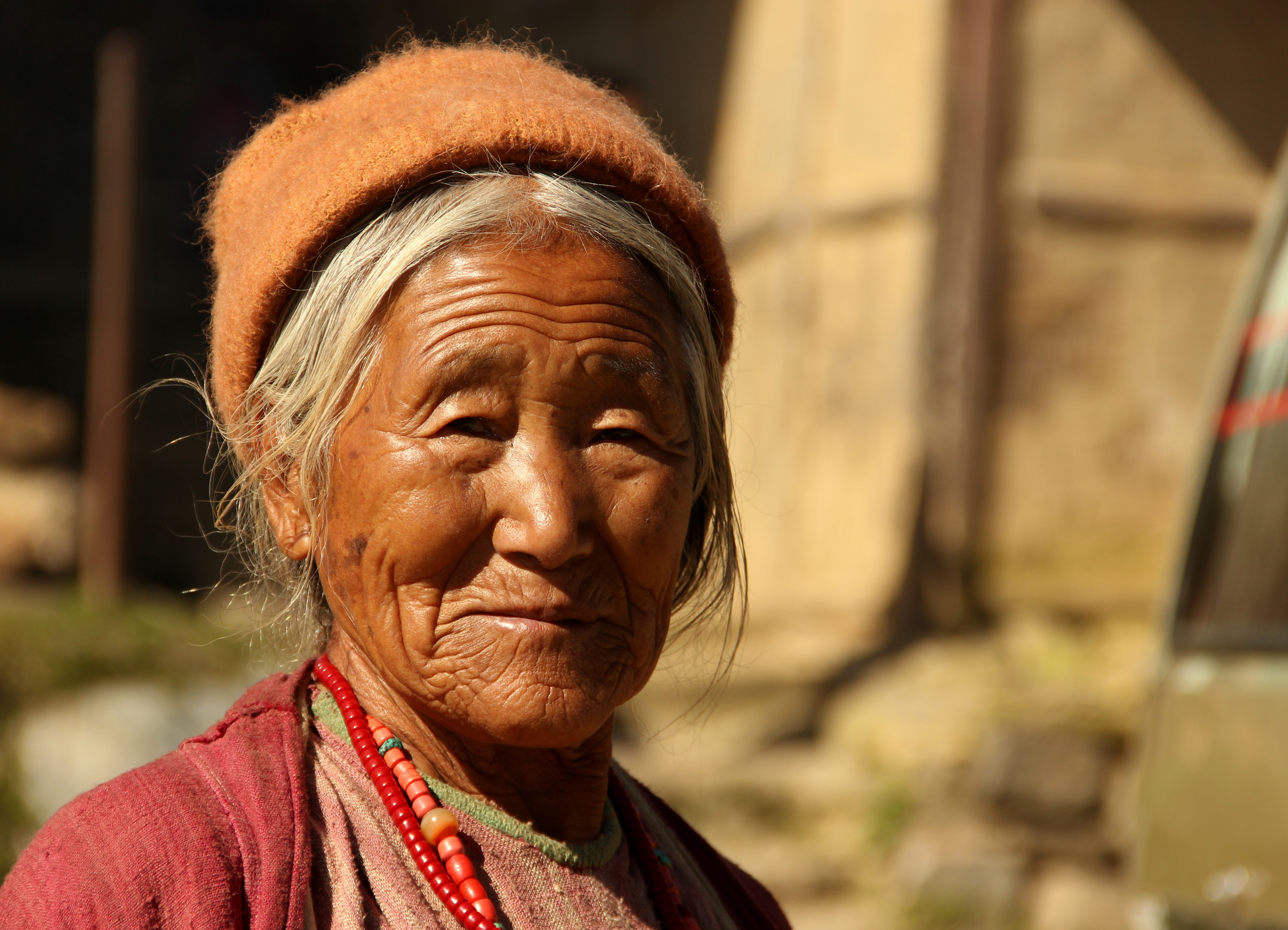
    A lady in Tawang, Arunachal Pradesh
    - Monpa (Chugpa, Takpa, Tshangla et al.)
    - Tibetans (Tibetan languages)
  - Khamba
  - Tani
    - Apatani/Tani, Galo/Abor, Nyishi, Hill Miri, Tagin, Na/Nga, Mising/Mishing
    - Adi/Lhoba (Millang, Minyong, Padam
  - Digaro-Mishmi
    - Mishmi (Idu Mishmi, Digaro Mishmi/Taraon/Darang Deng),
  - Miju
    - Miju Mishmi, Zekhring
  - Lolo-Burmese
    - Yobin
  - Hruso (association with Tibeto-Burman doubtful)
    - Hruso/Aka, Miji/Sajolang/Damai
  - Khowa (association with Tibeto-Burman doubtful)
    - Bugun (The Khowas)
    - Sherdukpen/Mey, Sartang
    - Lispha, Chug
    - Sulung/Puroik (association with Kho-Bwa doubtful)
  - Sal languages (Naga tribes [mostly Tibeto-Burman speaking; Nagamese creole], cf. "Northern Naga")
    - Singpho
    - Tangsa, Nocte, Wancho, Tutsa
    - Chakma
- Southwestern Tai
  - Khamti
  - Khamyang
- Other Indigenous Assamese people

== Distribution of various ethno-linguistic group in the state ==
As one of the Seven Sister States, or eight if including Sikkim in India's remote north-east, it is culturally at least as much part of Southeast Asia as it is of South Asia; ethnolinguistically, it is divided between various Tibeto-Burman speaking Tribes. Monpa area bordering Bhutan to the west, the Tani and Mishmi areas in the center, Singpho/Tangsa/Yobin area bordering Myanmar to the east and the Naga area bordering Nagaland in the south. It shares a large part of its border with China and the Indian state of Assam. In between there are transition zones, such as the Bugun/Aka/Hruso/Miji/Sherdukpen area, which form cultural "buffers" between the Tibetic Buddhist tribes and the Tani hill tribes. In addition, there are isolated peoples scattered throughout the state.

Within each of these cultural spheres, one finds populations of related tribes speaking related languages and sharing similar traditions. In the Tibetic area, one finds large numbers of Monpa tribespeople, with several subtribes speaking closely related but mutually incomprehensible languages, and also large numbers of Tibetans. Within the Tani area, major tribes include Nishi, which has recently come to be used by many people to encompass Bangni and even Hills Miri. Apatani also live among the Nishi, but are distinct. In the northern zone the Tagin presides as one of the major tribe extending up to the northeastern side of mechuka . In the centre, one finds predominantly Galo people, with the major sub-groups of Lare, Kargu-kardi and Pugo among others, extending to the Ramo and Pailibo areas (which are close in many ways to Galo). In the east, one finds the Adi, with many subtribes including Padam, Pasi, Minyong, and Bokar, among others. Milang, while also falling within the general "Adi" sphere, are in many ways quite distinct. Moving east, the Idu, Miju and Digaru make up the "Mishmi" cultural-linguistic area, which may or may not form a coherent historical grouping.

Moving southeast, the Tai Khamti are linguistically distinct from their neighbours and culturally distinct from the majority of other Arunachali tribes; they are religiously similar to the Chakmas who have migrated from erstwhile East Pakistan. They follow the same Theraveda sect of Buddhism. The Chakmas consist of the majority of the tribal population in Diyun Circleand are considered as minority ground in the state of mizoram, tripura and Myanmar. Districts of Lohit, Changlang and Papumpare have a considerable number of Chakmas. Assam also have a countable population of Chakmas who reside in the district of Karbi Anglong, and Dima Hasao district. They also exhibit considerable convergence with the Singpho and Tangsa tribes of the same area, all of which are also found in Burma. Finally, the Nocte and Wancho exhibit cultural and possibly also linguistic affinities to the tribes of Nagaland, which they border. There are also Indigenous Assamese people belonging to various indigenous Assamese communities in Arunachal Pradesh.

In addition, there are large numbers of migrants from diverse areas of India and Bangladesh, who, while legally not entitled to settle permanently, in practice stay indefinitely, progressively altering the traditional demographic makeup of the state. Finally, populations of "Nepalis" (in fact, usually Tibeto-Burman tribespeople whose tribes predominate in areas of Nepal, but who do not have tribal status in Arunachal Pradesh.) and Chakmas who are considered legal migrants are distributed in different areas of the state (although reliable figures are hard to come by).

== Literacy ==
Literacy has risen in official figures to 66.95% in 2011 from 54.74% in 2001. The literate population is said to number 789,943. Number of literate males are 454,532 (73.69%) and number of literate females are 335,411 (59.57%).

== Religion ==
Religion in Arunachal Pradesh
Religion	Percent
Christianity	30.3%
Hinduism	29.0%
Others (mostly Donyi-Polo)	26.2%
Buddhism	11.8%
Islam	1.9%
Sikhism	0.2%
Jainism	0.05%

Religion in Arunachal Pradesh
Religion	2001		2011	
Religion	Popul.	(%)	Popul.	(%)
Christianity	205,548	18.72	418,732	30.26
Hinduism	379,935	34.60	401,876	29.04
Buddhism	143,028	13.03	162,815	11.77
Islam	20,675	1.88	27,045	1.95
Sikhism	1,865	0.17	3,287	0.24
Jainism	216	0.02	771	0.05
Other (mostly Donyi-Polo)	337,399	30.73	362,553	26.20
Not stated	n/a	n/a	6,648	0.48
Total	1,097,968		1,383,727	

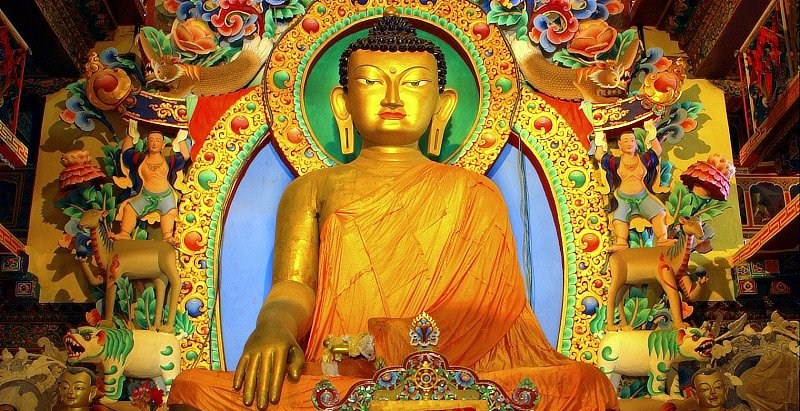
Buddhism is practiced by 12% of the population. Shown here is a statue of the Buddha in Tawang, Arunachal Pradesh.

- "Others" refers to indigenous religious traditions, such as Donyi-Polo (in the Tani area) or Rangfrah (further east). Tibetan Buddhism predominates in the districts of Tawang, West Kameng, and isolated regions adjacent to Tibet. Theravada Buddhism is practiced by groups living near the Burmese border like Changlang.

Out of the 101 recognized tribes, 37 have an animist majority (Nyishi, Adi, Galo, Tagin, Adi, Apatani, Bugun, etc.), 23 have a Christian majority (Wancho, Mossang Tangsa, Bori, Yobin, etc.), 15 have a Hindu majority (Mishmi, Mishing/Miri, Indigenous Assamese people, Nepali, Aka, Longchang Tangsa, etc.), and 17 have a Buddhist majority (Monpa, Khampti, Tawang Monpa, Momba, Singpho, Sherdukpen, Chakma, etc.). The remaining 8 tribes do not have a dominant religion (Nocte, Tangsa, Naga, etc.).

Cutting across all the religions, traditional marriage practices are often strictly within the same tribe; inter-tribe unions between communities are rare, yet on the rise in recent times.
