= Millang =

Subgroup of the Adi people found in Assam, India

The Milang tribe (alternately known as Millang, Malaa, or Holon) are a sub-group of the Adi people found in Arunachal Pradesh and nearby Rigbi, Jonai, in the Indian state of Assam.

== Etymology ==
The term Milang is an exonym. Members of the tribe call themselves Malaa.

== Language ==
The Malay people use a dialect unintelligible to most other subgroups of Adi. Several theories explain the dialect's creation, but most of the Malaa maintain they adopted it from the Soi-stem who inhabited their lands long before the Malaa people settled there. The Malaa still mention and remember the Soi-system people, who they claim migrated to other places, in their ballads, through lyrics like:

Soi belu kettunge, Sotem belu kettunge.

The Soi-system was believed to have originated from Kalang Ade, the highest peak in the land of the Malaa beyond which is the land of Idu Mishmi tribe.

== Religion ==
The Malaa are adherents of indigenous Donyi-Poloism, the practice of praying to the Sun Goddess and The Moon God. The priests, called Madar in Malaa, are believed to be the intermediaries between the natural, human world and the Spiritual, or supernatural world. Male priests are connected with the act of divination while the female priests are related to the healing of sickness. The priesthood is a hereditary practice, passed from generation to generation in a family. One particular ritual called Lulu involves the sacrificing of an animal to cure a disease. Whenever there is an epidemic or disease breakout in a village, the villagers construct a gate at the entrance of the village and a dog is sacrificed by hanging with its intestines sagging out. This ritual is called Lukan.

Aid Madar Bemmanu, a ritualistic dance, is performed throughout the night. During this dance, priests bargain to appease the spirits to release the souls of diseased people in exchange for gifts. The priests examine the liver of a chicken, read omens, and use those to interpret the nature of the disease and a corresponding sacrifice to be made to heal the ill.

Festival Name	Date
Aran	7 March
Solung Editor	15 May
Solung (Lune)	1 September

== Geography ==
The Malaa land lies approximately between 94-95 degree N latitude and 28-29 degree E longitude in the Upper Siang district. Their land extends to the Change and Felo hills in the north. To the south and the east, they are bounded by the land of the Padams.

Their land is a rich source of Aconitum plant (variously known as monk's hood or wolf's bane), the source of the powerful poison aconitine, which the Milang historically used on their spears and arrows during battle. The Anglo-Abor wars between 1835 and 1912 saw massive use of 'EMO'(called AMU in Millang) which was supplied from Peki Modi village against the invading British forces.

The principal rivers are Sidip, Yamane, Yammeng, Satamak, and Chapel.

Millang, Dabbing, and Peki Modi are their important ancestral villages. They now inhabit the hills and the valleys of East Siang, Upper Siang, and Lower Dibang Valley Districts of Arunachal Pradesh.

== Surnames ==
Surnames used by Malaa are based on family lineage. Common surnames include:

- Ayom
- Binggep
- Bitin
- Borang**
- Dalbong
- Daltem
- Dameng
- Gamno
- Langkam
- Lego**
- Litin
- Libang
- Miew
- Modi
- Ngukir
- Ngupok
- Patuk

Some of their clans/family with Milang history & origin**

Each Malaa surname is further subdivided into several clans. For example, the Modi has the following clans:

- Kevin
- Kebang-Bamuk, Bapok (Kepok)
- Rumi
- Taruk
- Mustang
- Miew
