= Mising language =

Sino-Tibetan language spoken in India

Mising
- Mising–Padam–Minyong
- Plains Miri
- Native to: India
- Region: Assam
- Ethnicity: Mising, Padam, Minyong
- Native speakers: 629,954 (2011)
- Language family: Sino-Tibetan: Tani; East Tani (Adi); Mising
- Dialects: Padam; Minyong; Mising (Plains Miri)

Language codes
- ISO 639-3: mrg
- Glottolog: misi1242
- ELP: Mising; Minyong; Padam
- Mising is classified as Definitely Endangered by the UNESCO Atlas of the World's Languages in Danger.

- Minyong is classified as Definitely Endangered by the UNESCO Atlas of the World's Languages in Danger.

Mising is a Tani language spoken by the Mising people. There are 629,954 speakers (as per Census of India, 2011), who inhabit mostly in the Dhemaji district, Lakhimpur, Sonitpur, Dibrugarh, Sibsagar, Jorhat, Majuli, Golaghat, Tinsukia districts of Assam and also some parts of Arunachal Pradesh. The primary literary body of Mising is known as 'Mising Agom Kébang (Mising Language Society)'.

The Mising, Padam and Minyong speak dialects of the same language.

== One year recognition by the Sahitya Akademi ==
For the year 2011, for the first time, Sahitya Akademi, India's highest literary body, recognised Mising eligible for receiving one of the six Bhasha Samman awards, for the category of the non-recognised languages, "that have developed sufficiently to merit the award".

"Mising is one such language which has a rich literary tradition though it does not have its own script but has adapted the Roman script. Through this convention, we will come to know who has worked in developing the language and literature, and the Bhasa Samman, which carries Rs 1 lakh prize money, will be a recognition of this effort."
"After selecting the communities for the award for one year, the system is to move on to other communities in the next year so that all such languages are given a chance to come up."

— Agrahar Krishna Murthy, Secretary of Sahitya Akademi, Delhi

Mising Oinitom song

== Phonology ==
=== Consonants ===
		Labial	Alveolar	Palatal	Velar	Glottal
Nasal		m	n	ɲ	ŋ	
Plosive/ Affricate	voiceless	p	t	(tʃ) (Note: [tʃ] and [dʒ] are typically rare, and mainly occur as allophones of /t d/ when after fricatives /s z/.)	k	
Plosive/ Affricate	voiced	b	d	(dʒ)	ɡ	
Fricative	voiceless		s			(h) (Note: [h] is heard in place of /s/ within variations of a local dialect.)
Fricative	voiced		z			
Tap			ɾ			
Approximant		(w) (Note: [w] is heard phonetically in different environments if a front or central vowel precedes a back vowel (i.e. /aɔ/ ~ [awɔ]).)	l	j		

=== Vowels ===
	Front	Central	Back
Close	i iː	ɨ ɨː	u uː
Mid	ɛ ɛː	ɜ ɜː	ɔ ɔː
Open		a aː	

== Geographical distribution ==
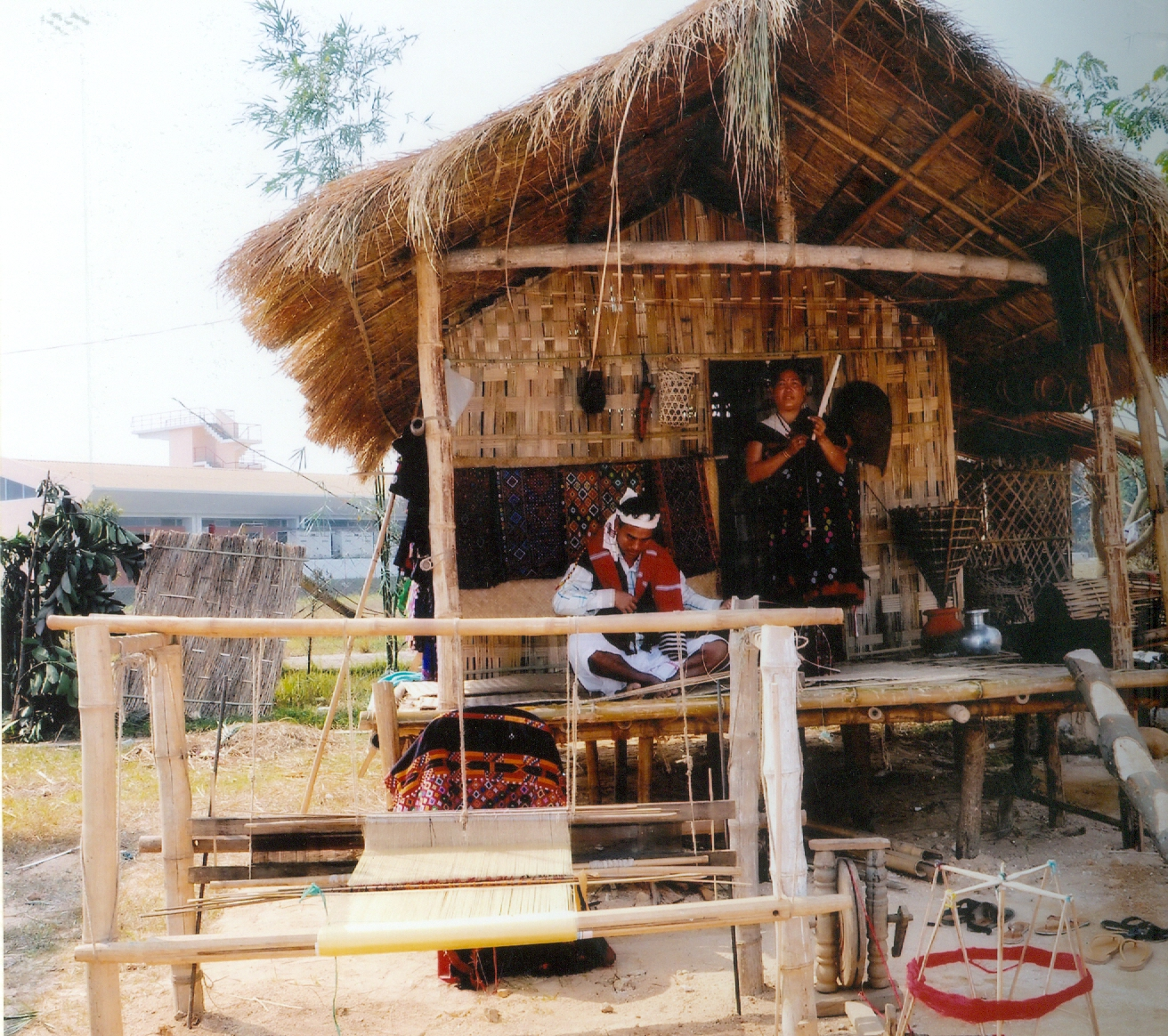
A traditional Mishing house is stilted.

Ethnologue gives the following locations for Mising speakers. The Hill Miri live in Arunachal Pradesh, while the Plains Miri live in Assam.

- Assam: North Lakhimpur, Sonitpur, Dhemaji, Dibrugarh, Sibsagar, Jorhat, Majuli, Charaideu, Bishwanath, Golaghat, and Tinsukia districts
- Arunachal Pradesh
  - Districts of East Siang, Lower Dibang valley and Lohit. Also on both sides of Kamla river in Ziro subdivision, Lower Subansiri district
  - Daporizo subdivision, Upper Subansiri district

== See also ==
- Mising Autonomous Council
- Takam Mising Porin Kebang
