= West Kameng district =

West Kameng District
- District of Arunachal Pradesh
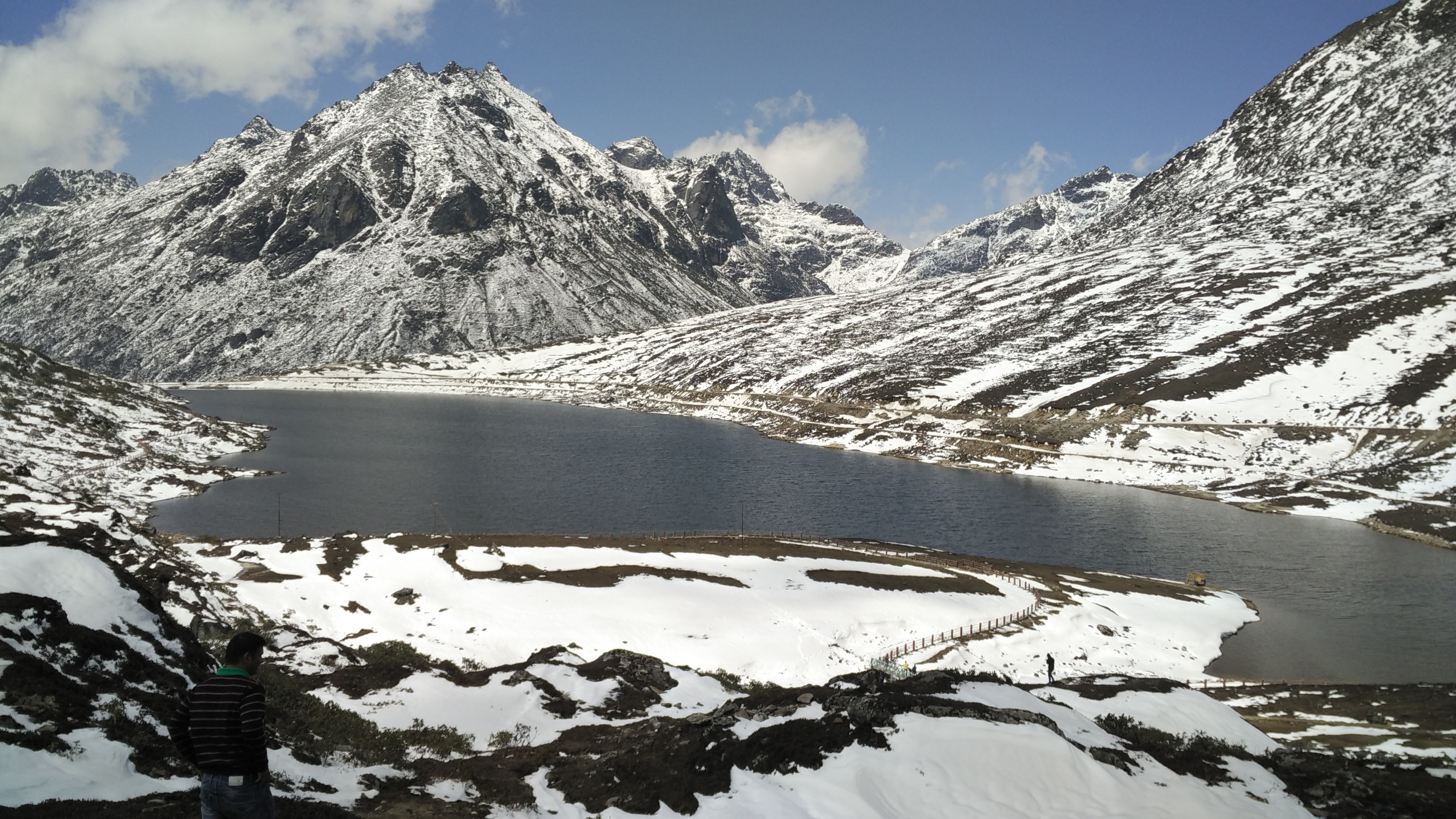
- Sela lake near the Sela Pass

- Location in Arunachal Pradesh
- Country: India
- State: Arunachal Pradesh
- Headquarters: Bomdila

Area
  - Total: 7,422 km^{2} (2,866 sq mi)

Population (2011)
  - Total: 83,947
  - Density: 11.31/km^{2} (29.29/sq mi)

Demographics
  - Literacy: 69.4%
  - Sex ratio: 755
- Time zone: UTC+05:30 (IST)
- Website: westkameng.nic.in

West Kameng district (/ˈkæmɛŋ/) is a district of Arunachal Pradesh in northeastern India. It accounts for 8.86% of the total area of the state. The name is derived from the Kameng river, a tributary of the Brahmaputra, that flows through the district.

== History ==
The area around the Kameng river has traditionally come under the control of the Mon kingdom, Bhutan, Tibet and the Ahom kingdom. Tibetan Buddhism got a strong foothold among the tribal groups as early as in the 7th century, where the Kachen Lama constructed the Lhagyala Gompa in Morshing.

Whenever loose control was exerted over the area, small, feudal chiefdoms ruled by the Miji and the Aka chiefs dominated control over the area. This can be evidenced in the fact that ruined fortresses like those in Bhalukpong constructed in the 10th to 12th century and the Dirang fort, which was constructed in the 17th century to defend against invasions from neighbouring chiefdoms.

Upon the arrival of the British, the present-day West Kameng was placed under what was known as the North-East Frontier Agency (later, Arunachal Pradesh). It was renamed as the Balipara Frontier tract in 1919, with its headquarters at Charduar in Assam. In 1946, the district area was carved out of the Balipara, with the name Sela Sub-Agency and its headquarters continued to be Charduar of Assam.

Following the independence of India, the Sela Sub-Agency was renamed as the Kameng Frontier Division. Its headquarters were later transferred to Bomdila in 1954. However, with the invasion of Tibet in 1950, Tibetan refugees started populating the area. Furthermore, with the invasion of the Chinese troops into this area, many historical monuments were either destroyed or defaced.

The Kameng Frontier Division was renamed as the Kameng District. The Political Officer was also redesignated as the Deputy Commissioner of Kameng. However, due to political reasons, the Kameng district was bifurcated between East Kameng and West Kameng on 1 June 1980. Tawang district, which initially belonged to part of the district, was separated on 6 October 1984. On March 7, 2024, Bichom district was carved out from West Kameng district comprising all the regions inhabited by the Miji community

== Geography ==
West Kameng district occupies an area of 7,442 square kilometres (2,873 sq mi), comparatively equivalent to Papua New Guinea's New Ireland. It lies approximately between 91° 30' to 92° 40' East longitudes and 26° 54' to 28° 01' North latitudes. The district shares an international border with Tibet in the north, Bhutan in the west, Tawang District in the northwest, and East Kameng district in the east. The southern border is shared with Sonitpur district and Udalguri district of Assam. The Eaglenest Wildlife Sanctuary is located in West Kameng.

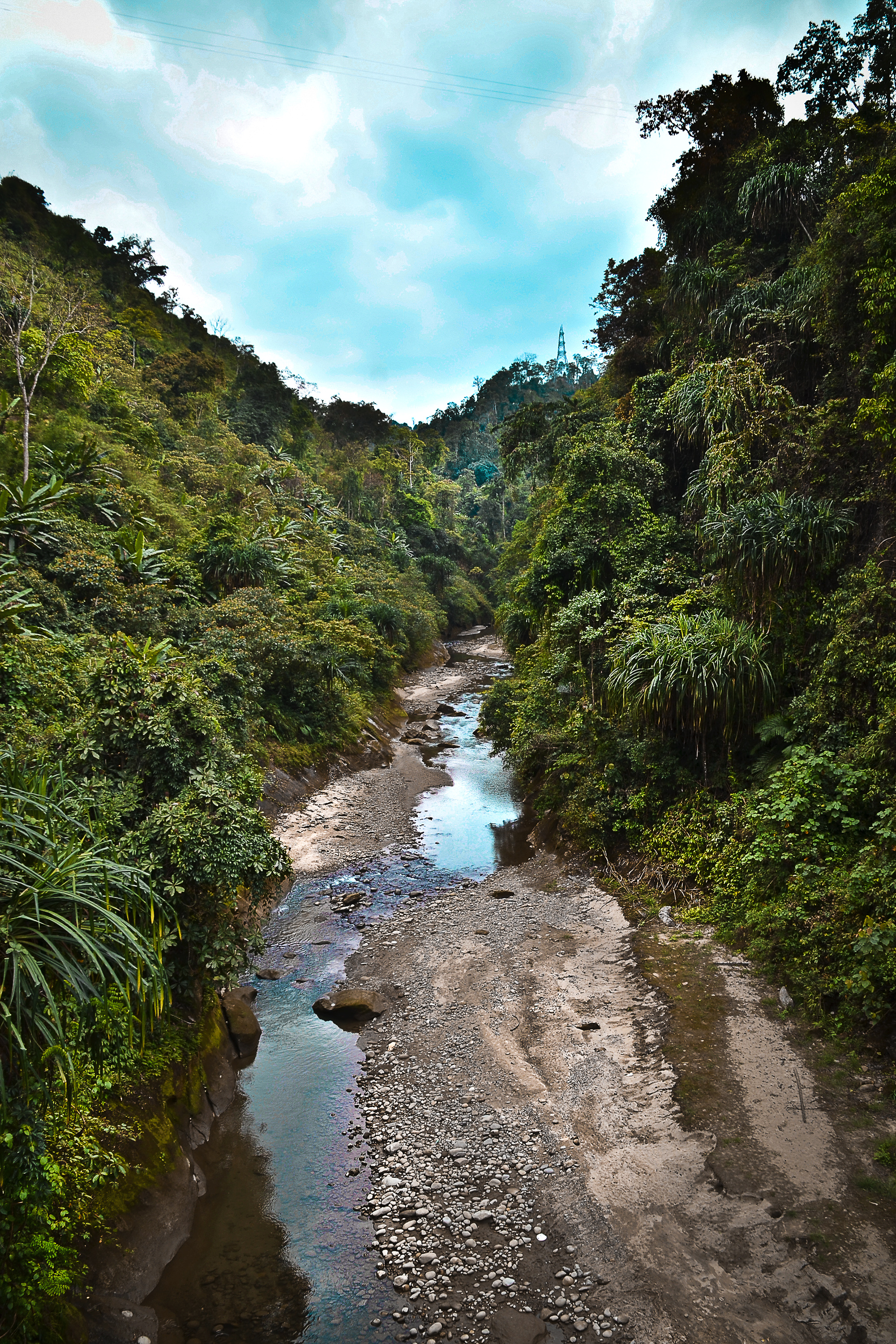
The scenic beauty of Bhalukpong in West Kameng district

=== Topography ===
The topography is mostly mountainous. Much of the West Kameng area is covered with the Himalayas. The highest peak in the district and state is Kangto.

=== Climate ===
Like East Kameng, the West Kameng district experiences an arid tundra or a cool temperate climate in the north. Snow fall occurs from mid-November to February. Snow can be also seen in Khupi, Bomdila, Sela. Sela range is the highest place in the district, situated at 13,714 feet above sea level.

== Transport ==
The 2,000-kilometre-long (1,200 mi) proposed Mago-Thingbu to Vijaynagar Arunachal Pradesh Frontier Highway along the McMahon Line, (will intersect with the proposed East-West Industrial Corridor Highway) and will pass through this district, alignment map of which can be seen here and here.

== Economy ==
Like most of Arunachal Pradesh, Jhum, or shifting cultivation, is practised among the tribes who live in lower elevations where there is a temperate or subtropical climate. Horticulture is practised as well.

Small industries such as textile and handicraft factories can be found. Nowadays tourism industries is booming in this district along Tawang district. With the improving of roads condition and investment in hospitality sectors the flow of tourists can be seen year-round.

== Divisions ==
The district is divided into three subdivisions, Thrizino, Rupa and Bomdila, which are further divided into twelve administrative circles, namely, Dirang, Bomdila, Kalaktang, Balemu, Bhalukpong, Jameri, Singchung, Nafra, Thrizino, Rupa, Thembang and Shergaon. The four development blocks in this district are Dirang, Kalaktang, Nafra-Buragaon, and Thrizino.

There are 4 Arunachal Pradesh Legislative Assembly constituencies located in this district: Dirang, Kalaktang, Thrizino-Buragaon and Bomdila. All of these are part of Arunachal West Lok Sabha constituency.

== Demographics ==
Historical population
Year	Pop.	±% p.a.
1961	26,872	—
1971	32,113	+1.80%
1981	41,567	+2.61%
1991	56,421	+3.10%
2001	74,599	+2.83%
2011	83,947	+1.19%

=== Population ===
According to the 2011 census West Kameng district has a population of 83,947, roughly equal to the nation of Antigua and Barbuda. This gives it a ranking of 618th in India (out of a total of 640). The district has a population density of 12 inhabitants per square kilometre (31/sq mi). Its population growth rate over the decade 2001–2011 was 16.64%. West Kameng has a sex ratio of 755 females for every 1000 males, and a literacy rate of 69.4%.

=== Language ===
West Kameng comprises five major tribes: Monpa (which includes Dirang, Bhut, Lish, and Kalaktang Monpa), Miji (Sajolang), Sherdukpen, Aka (Hrusso), and Bugun (Khowa). Minority tribes include Takpa, Lishipa, Chugpa, and Butpa. All of these indigenous communities use Hindi to communicate with each other.

Languages of West Kameng (2011)
1. Bhotia (33.1%)
2. Nepali (17.1%)
3. Hindi (9.83%)
4. Assamese (4.17%)
5. Bengali (3.64%)
6. Adi (2.39%)
7. Nyishi (2.36%)
8. Tibetan (1.65%)
9. Others (25.8%)

=== Religion ===
Most of the inhabitants are Buddhist, though the Aka, Bugun (Khowa), and Miji have indigenous religions and those tribe members follow a mix of Buddhism, Hinduism, and Donyi-Polo (a form of Animism).

Religion in West Kameng district (2011)
Religion	Per cent
Buddhism	42.99%
Hinduism	37.24%
Christianity	10.08%
Donyi Polo	6.86%
Islam	2.35%
Others	0.47%

== Flora and fauna ==
In 1989 West Kameng district became home to the Eaglenest Wildlife Sanctuary, which has an area of 217 km^{2} (83.8 mi^{2}). It is also home to the Sessa Orchid Wildlife Sanctuary, which was established in 1989 and has an area of 100 km^{2} (38.6 mi^{2}).
