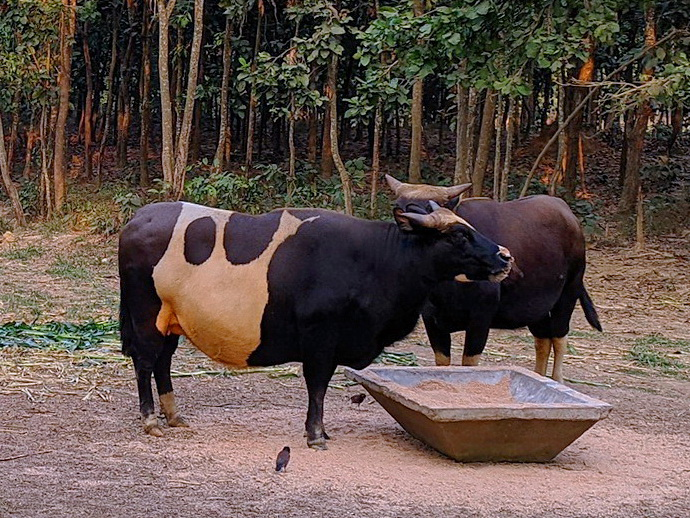
- Gayals at Gazipur Safari Park, Bangladesh

Conservation status
- Domesticated

Scientific classification
- Kingdom: Animalia
- Phylum: Chordata
- Class: Mammalia
- Order: Artiodactyla
- Family: Bovidae
- Subfamily: Bovinae
- Genus: Bos
- Species: B. frontalis

Binomial name
- Bos frontalis Lambert, 1804

Synonyms
- Species Level: Bibos frontalis; Subspecies Level: Bos gaurus frontalis; Bibos gaurus frontalis

= Gayal =

Species of domestic cattle

The gayal (Bos frontalis), also known as mithun or Drung ox, is a large semi-domesticated cattle in the Himalayan foothills of Indian Subcontinent and primarily in Northeast India.

== Taxonomy ==
In his first description of 1804, Aylmer Bourke Lambert applied the binomial Bos frontalis to a domestic specimen probably from Chittagong.

In 2003, the International Commission on Zoological Nomenclature fixed the first available specific name based on a wild population that the name for this wild species is valid by virtue of its being antedated by a name based on a domestic form. Most authors have adopted the binomial Bos frontalis for the domestic species as valid for the taxon.

Phylogenetic analysis corroborates the taxonomic assessment that the gayal is an independent Bos species originating matrilineally from gaur, zebu and taurine cattle.

There are two major hypotheses on the origin of the gayal:

- It was domesticated from wild gaur;
- It is a hybrid descendant from crossing of wild gaur and domestic cattle, either Bos indicus or Bos taurus.

Analysis of the genome of the gayal was published in 2017. In 2020, a phylogenetic analysis using complete mitochondrial genome sequences unambiguously indicated that the gaur is the maternal ancestor of domestic mithun. It was probably domesticated over 8,000 years ago along the Assam-Burma border, with wild gaur the most likely ancestor along with some gene introgression from zebu, Southern yellow cattle, and taurine cattle.

== Characteristics ==
The gayal differs in several important particulars from the gaur:

- It is somewhat smaller, with proportionately shorter limbs, and stands much lower at the withers.
- The ridge on the back is less developed, and bulls have a larger dewlap on the throat.
- The head is shorter and broader, with a perfectly flat forehead and a straight line between the bases of the horns.
- The thick and massive horns are less flattened and much less curved than in the gaur, extending almost directly outwards from the sides of the head, and curving somewhat upwards at the tips, but without any inward inclination. Their extremities are thus much farther apart than in the gaur.
- The female gayal is much smaller than the bull, and has scarcely any dewlap on the throat.
- The skin colour of the head and body is blackish-brown in both sexes, and the lower portion of the limbs are white or yellowish.
- The horns are of uniform blackish tint from base to tip.

Some domesticated gayals are parti-coloured, while others are completely white.

== Distribution and habitat ==
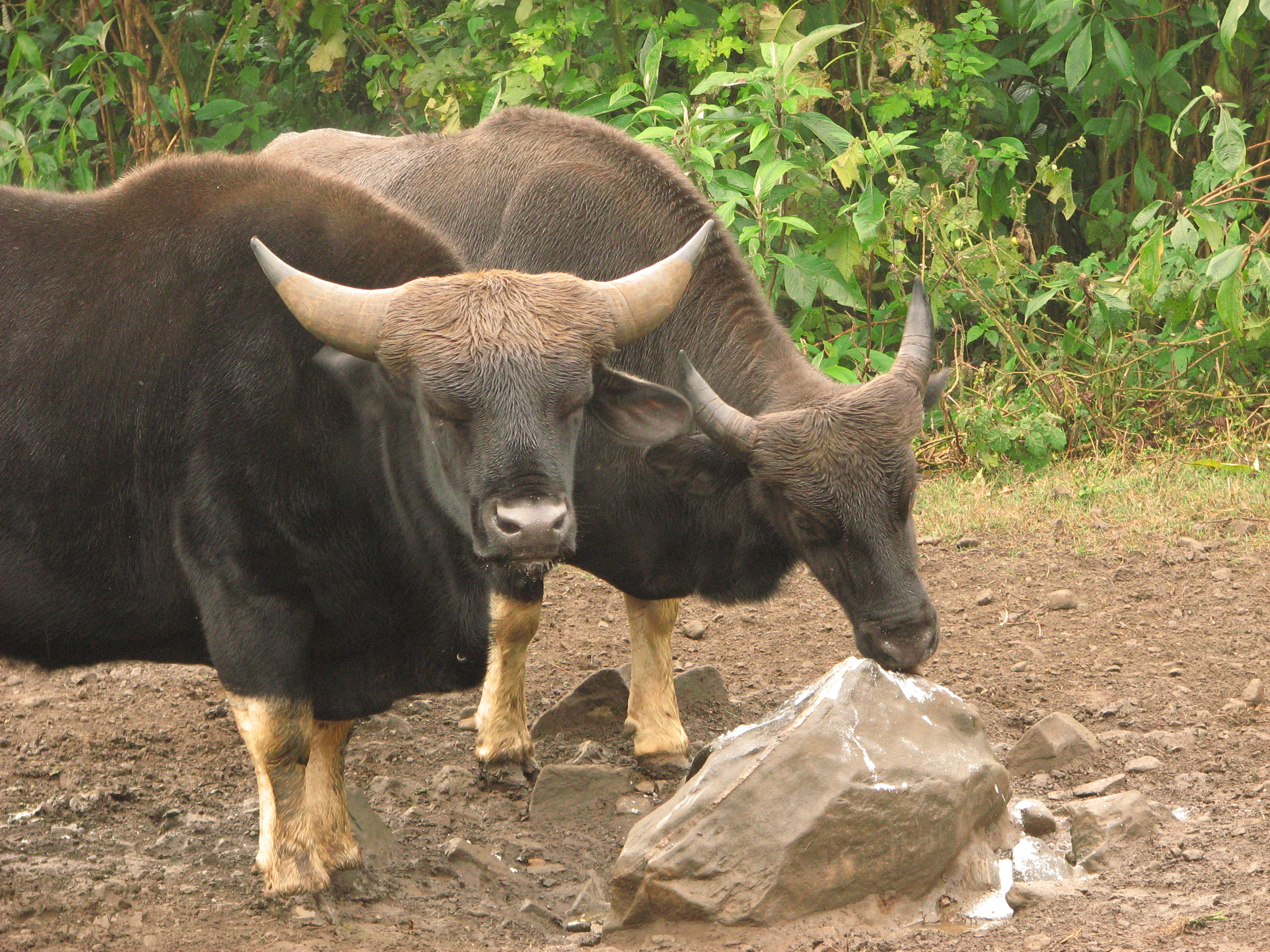
A gayal cow and calf, Arunachal Pradesh, India

Gayal occur on the southern slopes of the Eastern Himalayas in Northeast India, Bangladesh, Myanmar, Bhutan and in Yunnan, China at elevations of 300 to 5,000 m (980 to 16,400 ft) and temperature ranges from 20 to 30 °C (68 to 86 °F). Their preferred habitat is characterized by undisturbed forested regions on hilly terrain with streams, ponds, and lakes where abundant shrubs, trees, bamboo, and coarse grasses can be found. They are also drawn to salt lick hotspots.

In India, semi-domesticated gayals are kept by several ethnic groups living in the forested hills of Tripura, Mizoram, Assam, Arunachal Pradesh, Manipur and Nagaland. They also occur in the Chittagong Hill Tracts. In northern Burma, they occur in the Kachin State, and in adjacent Yunnan only in the Trung (Chinese: 独龙河) and Salween River basins.

Gayal serve an important ecological function and in northeast India function as ecosystem engineers, aiding in seed dispersal and enriching soil through their foraging activities and manure.

== In culture ==
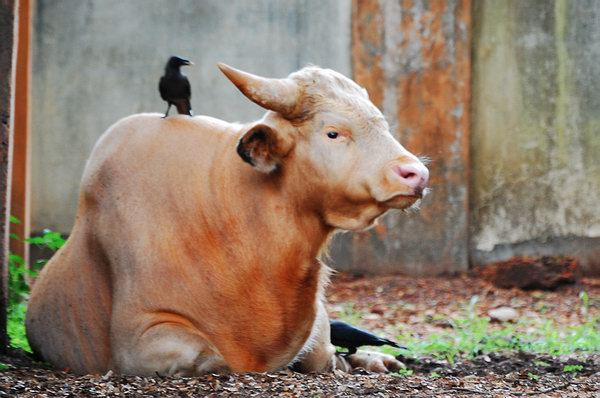
An albino akin mithun in Thrissur Zoo

The gayal is the state animal of Arunachal Pradesh and Nagaland. Gayal are reared for meat, milk, and ceremonial purposes, and are of economic, social, and cultural importance in many different ethnic groups in its range. They are known primarily as a meat animal, being used most often as a dairy animal in Northeast India and Bhutan. 24 ethnic groups across China, Bangladesh, Myanmar, and India have been recorded as being associated with gayal farming.

The role of the gayal is central to the lives of many residents of these areas, including transhumant ones who pair gayal herding with sago palm harvesting. The gayal is particularly important in the lifeways of the Tani peoples, including the Idu Mishmi, Nyishi, Galo, Adi (Bangni-Booker Lhobas including Pasi, Padam, Minyong), and of the Naga peoples, including the Ao Naga, Chang Naga, Konyak Naga, Khiamniungan Naga, Sangtam Naga, Sümi Naga, and Yimkhiung Naga. Gayal ownership is generally a signal of prosperity and high social status, and they are traditionally used as a form of currency, being exchanged for goods and alliances and used to pay fines and dowries. They also play a central role in religious ceremonies as a sacrificial animal or as a source of meat for festivals, feasts, religious and cultural events, and social gatherings. Sacrifice of a gayal generally is considered to bring honor and fortune to an individual or group, appease deities, and bring blessings, and the meat and blood of sacrificed gayal is auspicious.

For Galo people, gayal are a symbol of peace and harmony in the community, and an individual or family's wealth is measured by how many gayal they own. In Gallong, they are called hobo. During the Mopin festival held in April, gayal are sacrificed as offerings to the harvest goddess Mopin Ane, to bring a good harvest and a prosperous new year. Gayal are also part of the traditional dowry, with the groom's family gifting gayal to the bride's family. The amount and quality of the gayal given can be considered as both an indicator of the groom's family's status as well as an indicator of the bride's status.

In Naga folklore, man and gayal shared the same womb, which formed the basis for the close bond between the two species today. Gayal are a potent symbol of wealth, prosperity, and fertility. Carvings of gayal heads on the façades of homes are used to signify the social status of the residents. Among the Adi of Arunachal Pradesh, marriages are not fixed until the bridegroom's family gives at least one gayal to the bride's household.

Gayal are not commonly milked outside of Northeast India, and generally are not put to work. As gayal are semi-wild, traditionally they have been allowed to roam and forage freely in forests and return of their own accord, being given supplementary care by the herd owner. More contemporary practices have shifted towards creating fences, often living fences, to prevent gayal from straying into crop fields, where they can be shot and killed by farmers or cause crop damage which incurs a fine for their owners. It has also become increasingly common to call gayal back to the herd owners' pasture or barn on a nightly basis, in part due to the loss of livestock, especially calves, caused by dhole (Cuon alpinus) predation.

== National Research Centre on Mithun ==
The National Research Centre on Mithun was established at Medziphema in the Chümoukedima District of Nagaland under the Indian Council of Agricultural Research.

The mandate of the institute was redefined in 1997 and 2006. Currently, the National Research Centre on Mithun is functioning for developing the scientific and sustainable mithun rearing system and for catering the needs of mithun farmers with the following mandates:

- Identification, evaluation and characterization of mithun germplasm available in the country.
- Conservation and improvement of mithun for meat and milk.
- Act as a repository of germplasm and information centre on mithun.
