= Singchung =

Town in Arunachal Pradesh, India

- Town
- Location in Arunachal Pradesh, India Singchung (India)
- Coordinates: 27.2112°N 92.5066°E
- Country: India
- State: Arunachal Pradesh
- District: West Kameng
- Elevation: 1,680 m (5,510 ft)

Population (2011)
  - Total: 14,534
- Time zone: UTC+5:30 (IST)
- PIN: 790116
- Vehicle registration: AR-04

Singchung is a census town in West Kameng district, Arunachal Pradesh, India. As per 2011 Census of India, Singchung has a total population of 14,534 people including 9260 males and 5,274 females.

Bugun community is the primary community of Singchung, and their livelihood is cultivation including orchid farming.
