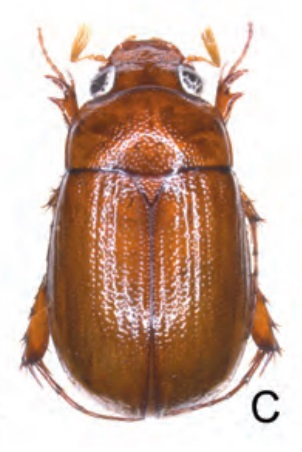

Scientific classification
- Kingdom: Animalia
- Phylum: Arthropoda
- Class: Insecta
- Order: Coleoptera
- Suborder: Polyphaga
- Infraorder: Scarabaeiformia
- Family: Scarabaeidae
- Genus: Neoserica
- Species: N. bhalukpongensis

Binomial name
- Neoserica bhalukpongensis Ahrens & Fabrizi, 2016

= Neoserica bhalukpongensis =

Species of beetle

Neoserica bhalukpongensis is a species of beetle of the family Scarabaeidae. It is found in India (Assam, Arunachal Pradesh).

== Description ==
Adults reach a length of about 6.9–7.2 mm. They have a yellowish brown, oval body. The dorsal surface is shiny and glabrous.

== Etymology ==
The species name refers to its type locality, Bhalukpong.
