= Bomdila =

- City
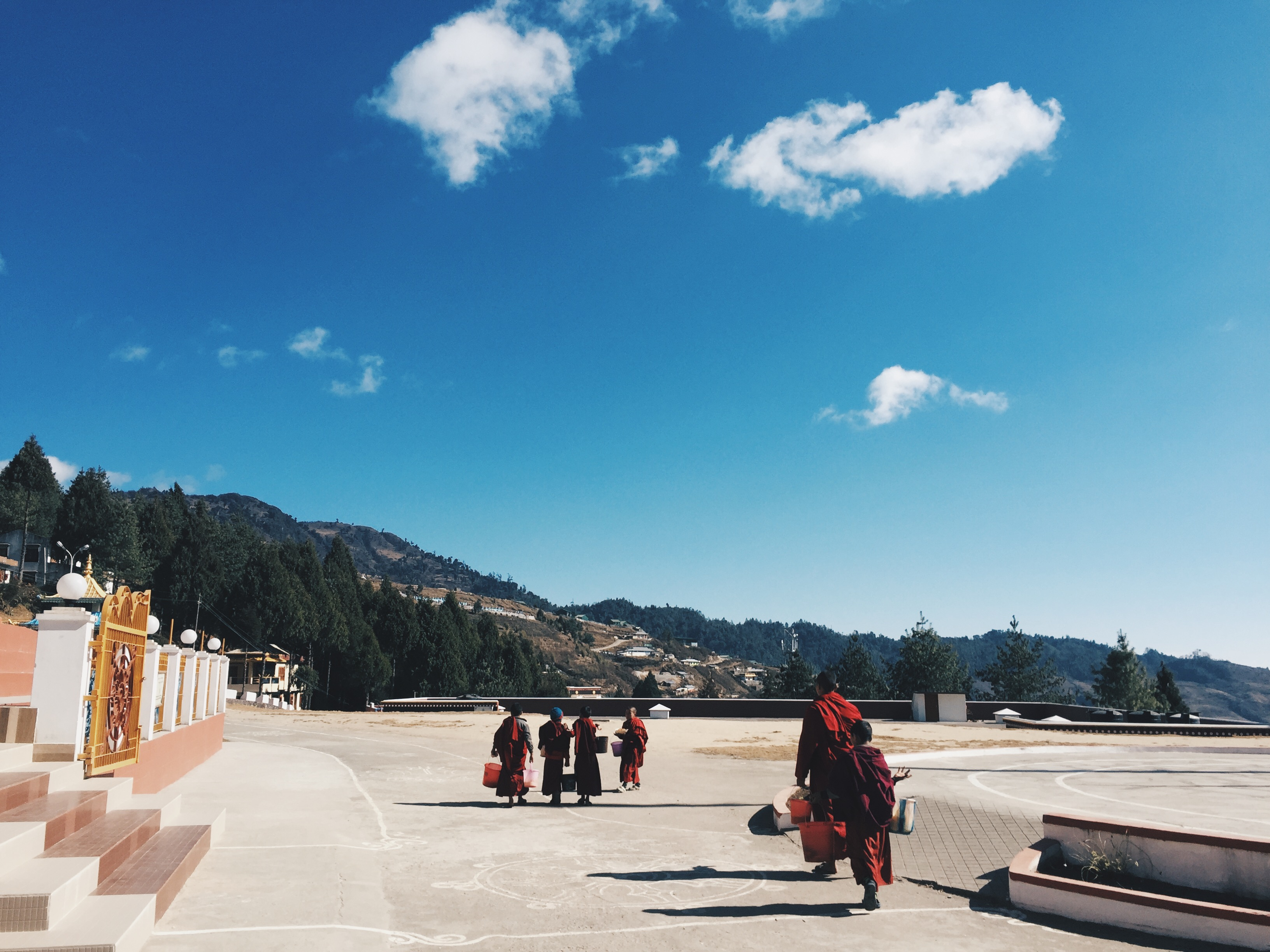
- Bomdila Monastery

- Location in Arunachal Pradesh, India Bomdila (India)
- Coordinates: 27.265°N 92.42°E
- Country: India
- State: Arunachal Pradesh
- District: West Kameng
- Elevation: 2,415 m (7,923 ft)

Population (2001)
  - Total: 6,685
- Time zone: UTC+5:30 (IST)
- ISO 3166 code: IN-AR
- Vehicle registration: AR 04

Bomdila is the headquarters of West Kameng district in the state of Arunachal Pradesh in India. Bomdila is one of the 60 constituencies of the state of Arunachal Pradesh. Bomdila, a virgin forest until modern times was built as Sela Sub Agency Capital by Major Ralengnao R Khathing. In February 1954, the shifting of the Headquarters of the Political Officer from Charduar to Bomdila was undertaken, and on February 28, 1954, Bomdila was officially made the capital of the Sela Sub Agency.

Bomdila is also the site of the last battle of the 1962 Battle of Se La Pass.

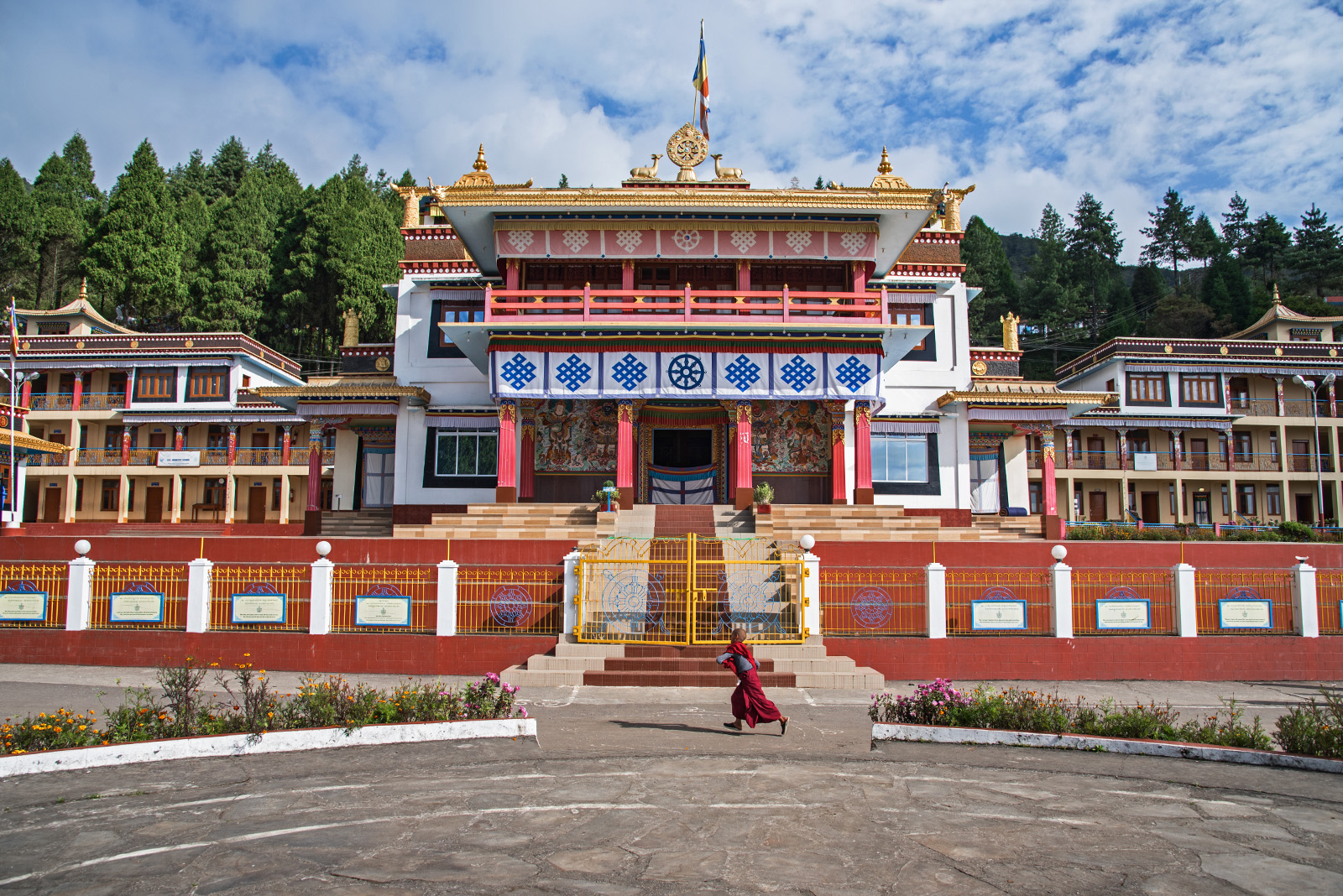
Bomdila Monastery

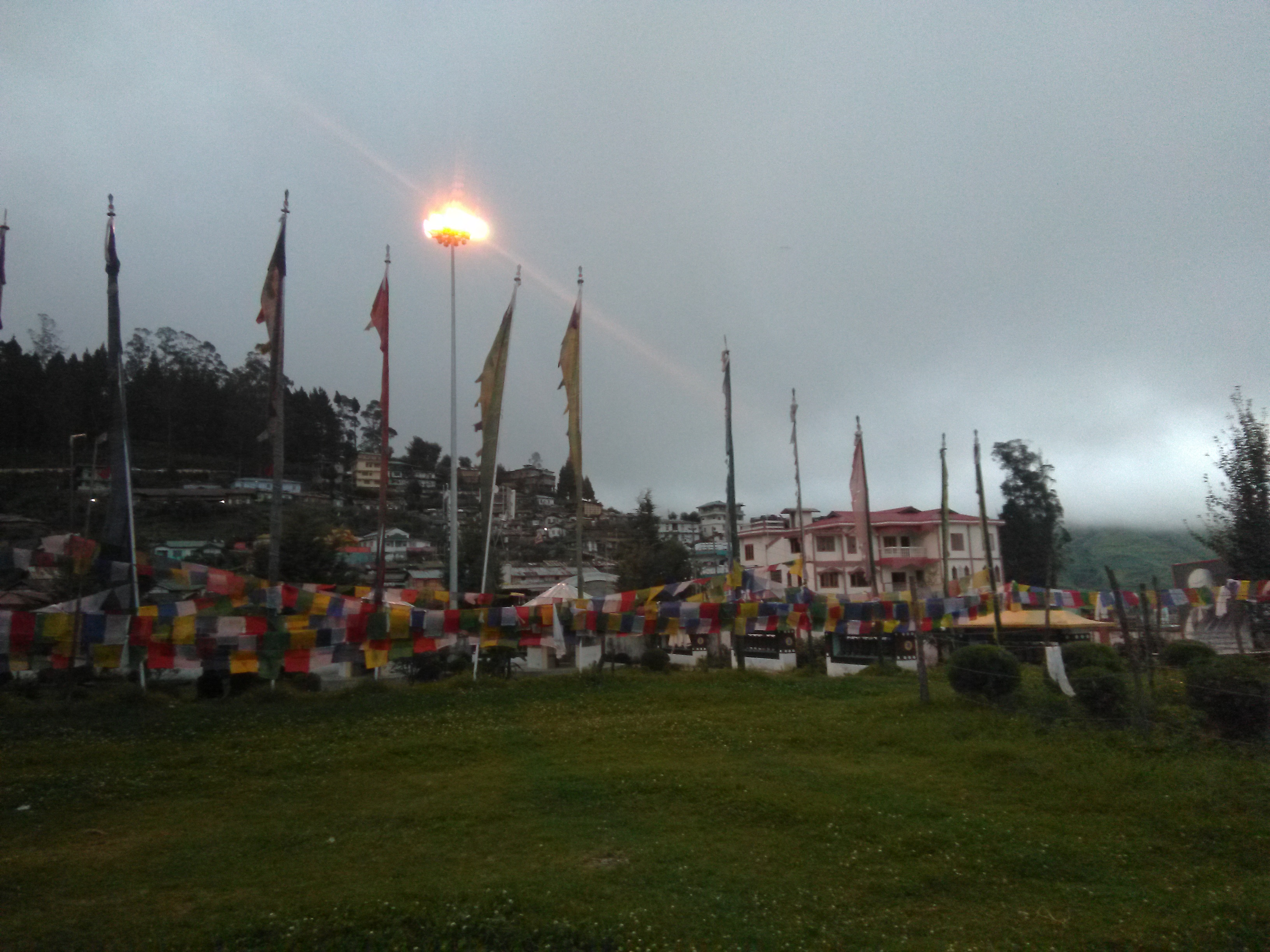
Bomdila Town

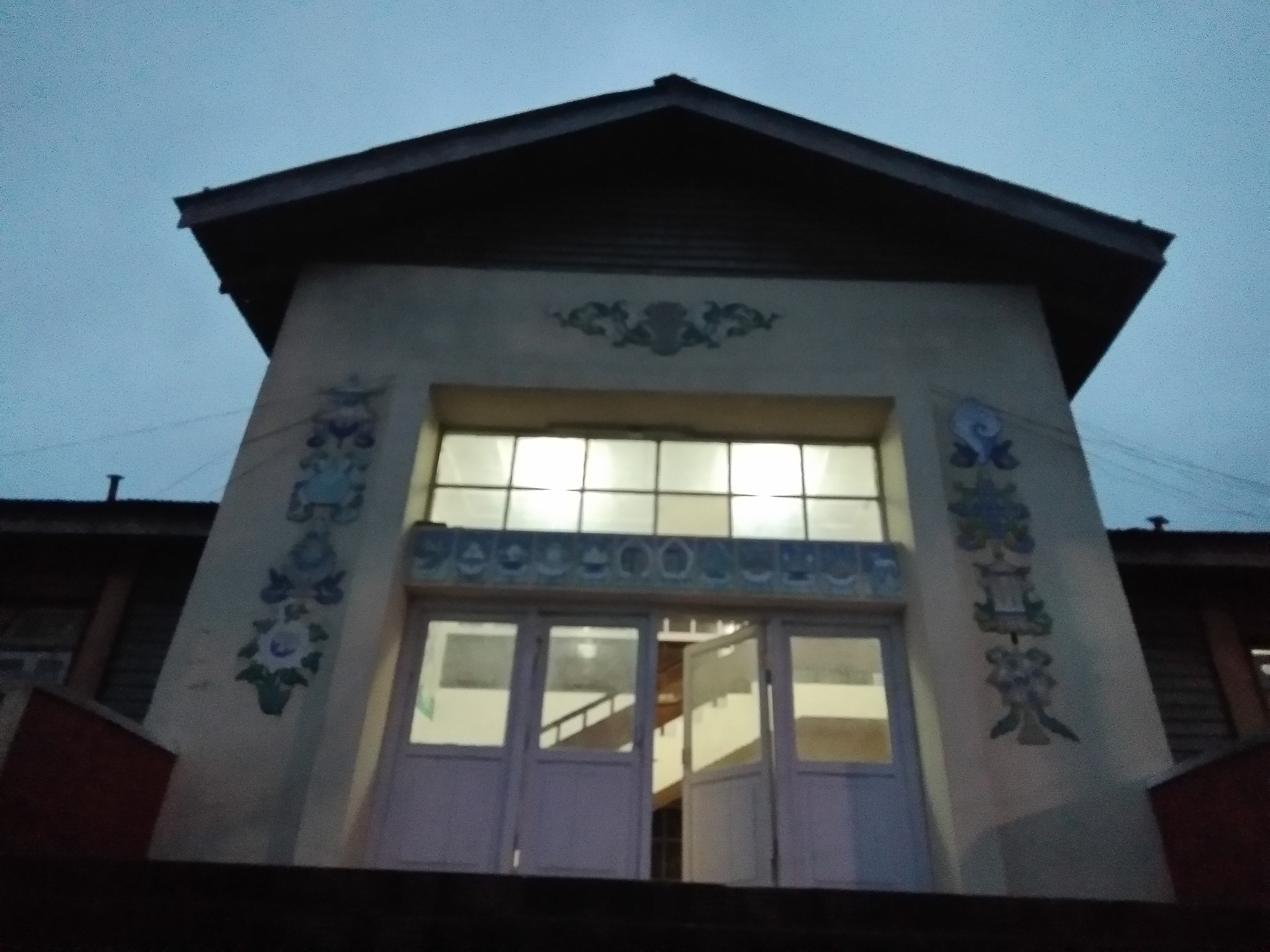
DC Office, Bomdila

== Geography and climate ==
Bomdila is located at 27.25°N 92.4°E. It has an average elevation of 2415 metres (7923 feet).

Climate: In Bomdila, the wet season is cool and mostly cloudy and the dry season is cold and clear. Over the course of the year, the temperature typically varies from 31 °F to 66 °F and is rarely below 27 °F or above 70 °F.

== Demographics ==
As of 2001 India census, Bomdila had a population of 6685. Males constitute 54% of the population and females 46%. Bomdila has an average literacy rate of 69%, higher than the national average of 59.5%; with male literacy of 75% and female literacy of 63%. 13% of the population is under 6 years of age. It is inhabited by the Monpa, Sherdukpen, Miji, Bugun (Khowa) and Aka tribes.

=== Languages ===
Languages spoken in Bomdila Town (2011)
1. Bhotia (29.6%)
2. Nepali (19.9%)
3. Hindi (6.20%)
4. Bengali (6.11%)
5. Assamese (6.07%)
6. Monpa (5.88%)
7. Nishi (4.03%)
8. Bhojpuri (2.68%)
9. Others (19.8%)

According to Census 2011, Bhotia is Spoken by 2,479 people, Nepali is Spoken by 1,670 people, Hindi at 519 people, Bengali language by 511, Assamese by 508 people, Monpa by 492 people, Nishi by 337 people and Bhojpuri at 224.

== Transport ==
Despite its rough roads and tough climatic conditions, Bomdila is well connected with Guwahati (320 km), Tawang (167 km), and Tezpur (162 km). Although one should be aware of the landslides while traveling by road. The nearest airport is in Tezpur (Assam) where buses and cabs can be easily availed. The closest railway station is Rangapara Railway station (Assam) which is around 145 km away from Bomdila.

== Features ==
The Eaglenest Wildlife Sanctuary is near Bomdila. The Bomdila pass offers views of Kangto and Gorichen Peaks, the highest in the state. Around the town, apple orchards and orchid farms are places of interest for many people. The historical 17th-century Lhagyala Monastery at Morshing village (70 km from Bomdila).

Kunzang Choekhor Ling Monastery is a Buddhist temple and Nyingma monastery located in Pema Ling Colony, Bomdila. It was established by H.E. 8th Tulku Namdrol and is known for its tranquil and a vantage view point.

Tourism has become a big source of income in Bomdila because of infrastructure developments. Many new hotels and homestays have come up. It has become a halt station for tourists traveling to Tawang. Much of the food here is local cuisine but one can get North Indian food on order.

== Media ==
Bomdila has an All India Radio Relay station known as Akashvani Bomdila. It broadcasts on FM frequencies.

Famous Celebrity includes Kismchi Namsa, an MBA graduate from NIT Jaipur.
