= Bhalukpong =

Bhalukpung
- town
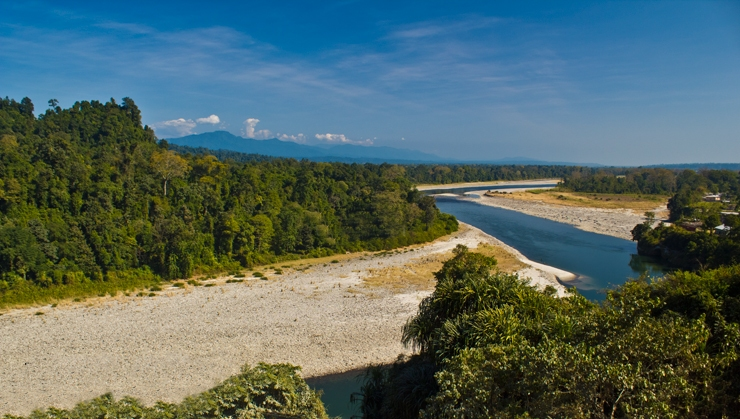
- Bhalukpung

- Location in Arunachal Pradesh, India Bhalukpung (India)
- Coordinates: 27.011°N 92.646°E
- Country: India
- State: Arunachal Pradesh
- District: West Kameng
- Elevation: 213 m (699 ft)

Languages
  - Official: English
- Time zone: UTC+5:30 (IST)
- PIN: 790114
- Vehicle registration: AR
- Nearest city: Tezpur
- Lok Sabha constituency: Arunachal West
- Vidhan Sabha constituency: Thrizino-Buragaon

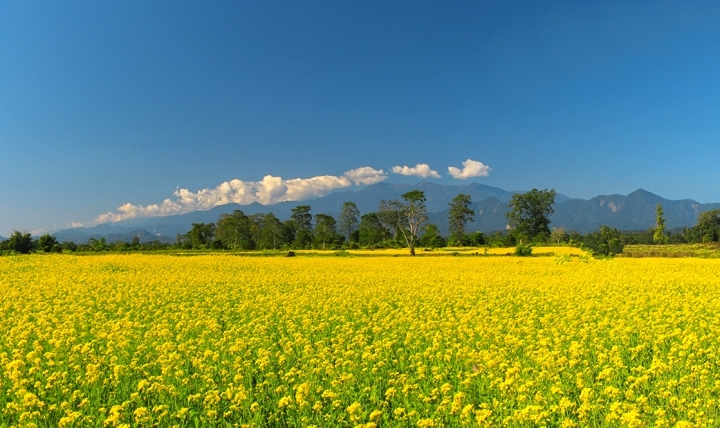
Salna Bari

Bhalukpung is a small town located along the southern reaches of the Himalayas in West Kameng district of Arunachal Pradesh in India. The town is located at 213m above sea level, 100 km from Bomdila, 52 km from Tezpur and 5 km from Tipi. It lies along the Kameng river and is the headquarters of Bhalukpung circle. A road leads to Bomdila via the Tipi Orchidariurm, and the inner line check post is located at Bhalukpung. It has a railway station namely Bhalukpong Railway Station, connected to Rangiya Murkongselek rail line at Balipara. It has 3 platforms. One pair of trains runs daily to and from here.

Bhalukpung was governed by local tribal Aka rulers, with occasional political dominance from Bhutan and Assam. Ahom rulers of Assam did not interfere with the local tribals, except for retaliatory raids into the tribal territory. In 1873, the British had declared the area around Bhalukpung as off-limits.

Fish angling and river rafting are the principal tourist activities in Bhalukpung. Tourist attractions in Bhalukpung include the Pakhui Game Sanctuary and Tipi Orchidarium, which hosts over 2600 cultivated orchids from 80 different species.

The annual festival Nyethidow of the Aka tribe is celebrated in January at Bhalukpung, Thrizino. Bhalukpung is inhabited by members of the Aka Tribes.
