= Adi Agom Kebang =

Apex Literary Body for the Adi Language of Arunachal Pradesh, India

Adi Agom Kébang
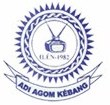
- Website type: Society Organization
- Available in: English & Adi
- Website: http://www.adiagomkebang.org
- Registration: SR/ITA/30 of 13/07/1982
- Current status: Offline

Adi Agom Kébang (AAK) is the apex literary body for the Adi people of Arunachal Pradesh, India that promotes and develops Adi language. AAK is currently headed by Kaliːng Borang, President, and its general secretary Tajing Takí.

AAK has been instrumental in adoption of modified roman script for writing in Adi language with 28 letters. The two additional letters are É and Í to represent sounds present in the Adi language. To differentiate between long and short vowels, the long vowel marker ː is used.

AAK is actively involved in writing and revising Adi language textbooks to be taught in classes 6, 7 and 8 as a third language.

AAK has been actively working to develop literature in Adi language since 1982.
