= Talom Rukbo =

Indian religious leader

Talom Rukbo (1937–2001) was the father of Donyi-Polo religion, a revivalist religious movement based in Arunachal Pradesh which attempts to reconstruct Tani (Adi) animist spirituality. Rukbo has been named one of the inspirations for the Vanavasi Kalyan Ashram project run by the Rashtriya Swayamsevak Sangh.
