= Kalaktang =

- town
- Location in Arunachal Pradesh, India Kalaktang (India)
- Coordinates: 27°06′N 92°06′E
- Country: India
- State: Arunachal Pradesh
- District: West Kameng
- Time zone: UTC+5:30 (IST)
- Vidhan Sabha constituency: West Kameng

Kalaktang is a town in the Indian state of Arunachal Pradesh West Kameng is the name of the district that contains town Kalaktang.

Kalaktang is one of the 60 constituencies of Legislative Assembly of Arunachal Pradesh. Name of current MLA (May-2019) of this constituency is Mr. Dorjee Wangdi Kharma. He was a former D.D.S.E

== See also ==
- List of constituencies of Arunachal Pradesh Legislative Assembly
- Arunachal Pradesh Legislative Assembly
