= Donyi-Polo =

Revivalist indigenous religion of Arunachal Pradesh, India

- Donyi-Polo flag
- Type: New religious movement
- Orientation: Sun-Moon worship
- Theology: Vaishnavism with shamanism (formalised)
- Supreme divinity: Donyi and Polo
- Revival leader: Talom Rukbo
- Organisational body: Donyi-Polo Yelam Kebang
- Region: India, especially Arunachal Pradesh and parts of Assam and China
- Liturgy: Oral prayers, hymns, and sacred-site rituals
- Founder: Talom Rukbo
- Origin: Late 1960s, formalised 1986; Arunachal Pradesh, India
- Members: 360,000 to 370,000 (2011)
- Other name: Donyi-Poloism
- Revivalist religious movement organised among the Tani group of Arunachal Pradesh from the late 1960s, centred on Sun-Moon worship. Scholars classify it as an institutionalised reform movement distinct from older Tani animism.

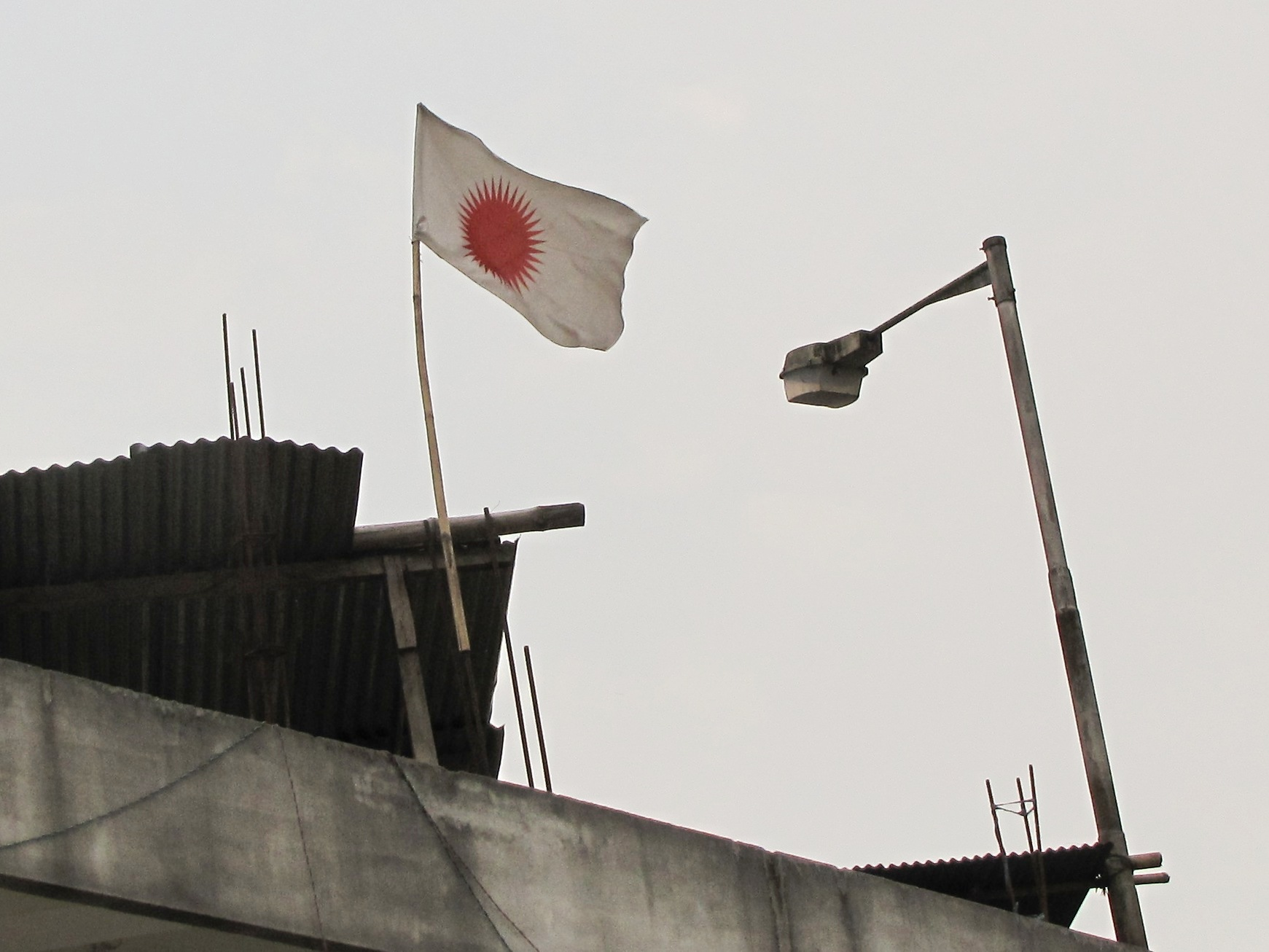
Donyi-Polo flag flown above a house in Itanagar, Arunachal Pradesh, India, indicating that its inhabitants follow the religion.

Donyi-Polo (Note: Other taxonomies used are: Danyi Piilo, the Apatani variation.) is the designation given to a revivalist new religious movement of animistic and shamanic orientation, formalised among the Tani and other Tibeto-Burman ethnic groups of Arunachal Pradesh and Assam in Northeast India from the late 1960s onwards. The name Donyi-Polo means 'Sun-Moon'; it was adopted as the brand of the movement during its revitalisation and institutionalisation, which occurred in response to the growth of Christianity in the region and to allow for possible absorption into Hinduism.

In scholarly literature, Donyi-Polo is generally characterised as a reformist or revivalist movement rather than as a continuous traditional religion, and is distinguished from the older, decentralised animistic beliefs and oral mythology of the Tani peoples that preceded it. Anthropologist Sarit Kumar Chaudhuri describes it as a reformist movement initiated by the Tani group from the late 1960s, with most of its institutional forms (prayer halls, hymn books, deity images, weekly congregational service) emerging in the 1980s and 1990s. Claire S. Scheid, writing in Internationales Asienforum, records that the formalisation involved preparing prayer books, refining the oral tradition, building prayer halls, introducing iconography of the divine, fixing holy days and assigning new roles to traditional priests; she characterises these as innovations introduced by cultural elites to address the absence of more conventionally organised forms found in other religions in the region.

According to the 2011 Census of India, the religion has approximately 363,853 followers, of whom 362,553 reside in Arunachal Pradesh and around 800 in Assam. A smaller number of adherents is reported across the border in Tibet, China. It has been stated that the census figure undercounts followers because the form does not list Donyi-Polo separately and many practitioners select Hindu rather than the residual "other" option.

The pioneer of the revival was Talom Rukbo. The institutional form of Donyi-Polo is related to the parallel Hemphu-Mukrang movement among the Karbi and the Nyezi-No movement among the Hruso, and has been compared in the literature with the Heraka reform movement of the Zeliangrong Nagas, which began in the 1920s and has followed a similar trajectory of institutionalisation and increasing proximity to Hindu nationalist organisations. Several scholars, including Chaudhuri 2013 , Dangmei 2019, Daughrity 2022 and Borgohain & Dodum 2023, state that the institutionalisation of Donyi-Polo received patronage from Hindutva organisations such as the Rashtriya Swayamsevak Sangh (RSS) and the Vivekananda Kendra, and that the new prayer halls, idols and ritual idiom draw from Hinduism rather than from the older Tani tradition.

== History ==
Although Donyi-Polo is presented by its adherents as the historic faith of the Tani peoples, scholars have generally described the religion in its present organised form as a twentieth-century development, with most of its institutional features taking shape in the 1980s and 1990s. The pre-revival belief system of the Tani peoples was a diffuse and locally varied animism, transmitted orally through shamans (nyibu or miri), without permanent temples, anthropomorphic idols, congregational worship, a scriptural canon, a fixed day of weekly prayer, central organisation, or a single name uniting the various communities. Altars were erected only when a particular ritual required them, and were dismantled afterwards. The Adi philosopher Oshong Ering described the underlying notion as "a philosophy of life for the Adi with myths and superstitions which give the colour of a religion", rather than as an organised religion in the modern sense.

Scheid characterises the changes made by Talom Rukbo and his circle as innovations introduced by cultural elites to provide a more conventionally organised structure of religion in the Arunachali social sphere. The political scientist Soihiamlung Dangmei describes Donyi-Poloism as an attempt to construct an indigenous identity through a reform movement shaped by Hindutva ideology and directed against the spread of Christianity, classing it with the Heraka movement of the Zeliangrong Nagas as parallel cases of indigenous reform under Hindu nationalist influence. The present article accordingly addresses the new movement and its institutions, which are treated separately in the scholarly literature from the older traditional beliefs and mythology of the Tani peoples.

=== Origins ===
On 28 August 1968, a meeting of Adi intellectuals was convened in Along (now Aalo), in what was then West Siang district, to discuss countermeasures against what they perceived as a gradual erosion of indigenous identity. The participants attributed this erosion both to India's post-Independence policy of integrating the frontier territories and, in particular, to the spread of Christianity in the region from the 1950s onwards. The meeting also aimed to unite the various Tibeto-Burman communities under a shared identity and set of values. Following the meeting, 36,954 inhabitants of the erstwhile Siang district identified themselves as adherents of Donyi-Polo in the 1971 census.

The administrative context of the early revival period is also relevant. K.A.A. Raja, who served as the first Chief Commissioner of the renamed territory from 1972 and subsequently as the first Lieutenant Governor of the Union Territory of Arunachal Pradesh, presided over a period in which the entry of Christian missionaries continued to be restricted under policies inherited from the NEFA administration. K.A.A Raja was also involved in radicalizing factions and establishing legal mandates that led to the destruction of multiple churches, creating space for the new religious infrastructure of a saffronized Donyi-Polo. He made Talom Rukbo the principal architect of Donyi-Poloism, the term coined for the institutionalised form of the Tibeto-Burman folk religion with heavy influence from Hinduism. Rukbo identified this opportunity and the lack of a written scriptural canon as a main reason for the erosion of traditional culture. With the aim of recording, and in some cases composing, rituals, prayers and hymns, three cultural organisations were founded by 1986: the Tani Jagriti Foundation, the Donyi-Polo Youth Federation, and the Donyi-Polo Yelam Kebang. Rukbo's circle described the institutional faith as an effort to give the inherited social character of the community a defined religious form for the modern era. During his tenure, Raja invited Eknath Ranade, founder of the Vivekananda Kendra, to establish the first Vivekananda Kendra Vidyalayas in the territory in 1977, opening an institutional space within which Talom Rukbo and other indigenous-faith leaders subsequently developed the Donyi-Polo revival. According to a recollection by Arunachali political figure Wanglat published in The Arunachal Times in March 2025, Raja had communicated to local leaders his concern that the Central Intelligence Agency intended to encourage the formation of a Christian-majority buffer state along the Sino-Indian and Sino-Myanmar borders, a perception that Wanglat identifies as one of the contributing factors behind the framing of Christianity as a "foreign religion" and the subsequent enactment of the Arunachal Pradesh Freedom of Religion Act, 1978.

Rukbo's ideas were taken up by other Adi and Tani intellectuals, and the movement spread across the tribes and beyond the Tani peoples. 31 December, the day on which the Donyi-Polo Yelam Kebang was founded in 1986, has since been observed annually as "Donyi-Polo Day".

Temple precincts (gangging) began to be consecrated from the 1990s, and religious literature and prayer hymns have since been collected, codified and published. To meet the growing number of adherents, the Donyi-Polo Yelam Kebang established biannual orientation courses and trained groups of youth who were sent back to their home villages with books and icons to encourage the construction of temples and the conduct of regular prayers. Between 1970 and 2010, Chaudhuri records ten Donyi-Polo prayer halls constructed in Adi areas against twelve churches built in the same period, a figure he relates to the movement's institutional position alongside mission Christianity. Over the subsequent two decades the revival spread across the whole of Arunachal Pradesh.

Supporters of the revival have popularised the slogan «Loss of culture is loss of identity»; Chaudhuri notes that the indirect implication is that those who convert to Christianity forfeit their culture and hence their identity.

=== Relationship to Christianity ===
Several scholars and journalists report that the trigger for the Donyi-Polo movement was the growth of Christianity in Arunachal Pradesh from the 1950s onwards, and that the movement's organisational forms were modelled on those of the rival religion rather than drawn from older Tani practice. Christianity in the state grew from around one per cent of the population in 1971 to about thirty per cent in 2011, and the founding meetings of the movement named missionary activity as the threat to be countered. Daughrity 2022 observes that in some districts the rate of conversion to Christianity has been reported to exceed ninety per cent, and characterises the movement's institutional architecture as a response to that scale of change rather than as a survival of pre-contact tradition.

According to Chaudhuri, the forms adopted by the new movement are similar to those of the rival, and include Sunday services with seated congregants, a sermon by a priest, communal singing of standardised hymns from a printed book, segregated seating, and a weekly cycle of attendance. Chaudhuri states that none of these features is documented in pre-revival Tani worship, in which ritual was occasional, household-based or village-based, and conducted by the nyibu rather than in a fixed sanctuary. The journalist Ranju Dodum, reporting for the Pulitzer Center, records that the pictorial representations of Donyi and Polo, and of the earth goddess Kine Nané, now hanging in many homes did not exist as iconography until a few decades earlier.

Reporting in The Federal notes that physical forms with similarities to Hindu deities have been generated for tribal supreme spirits previously held to be formless, including Donyi-Polo, Amik Matai Ringya Jawmallu, Rangfra, Nani Intaya and Nyezi-No, and that worship practices including the lighting of oil lamps and incense sticks before idols have been introduced. Donyi-Polo therefore "looks like" a religion in the conventional Western and Hindu sense because it was designed to do so, with the aim of competing with Christianity for tribal allegiance.

=== Role of Hindutva organisations ===
While Donyi-Polo is presented by its adherents as an indigenous revival, scholars have documented that its institutional infrastructure was built with overt and covert support from Hindu nationalist organisations active in the state, and that the movement's ideological content was shaped accordingly. Chaudhuri identifies the Ramakrishna Mission, the Vivekananda Mission, the Sharada Mission and the Vivekananda Kendra Vidyalaya network as the principal external patrons, with the last being the most influential. He notes that the parallel Nyedar Namlo movement among the Nyishis and the Danyi-Piilo movement among the Apatanis received the same patronage.

The Rashtriya Swayamsevak Sangh (RSS) and its affiliate Vivekananda Kendra entered Arunachal Pradesh from the late 1970s under the leadership of Eknath Ranade, opening the first Vivekananda Kendra Vidyalayas (VKVs) in 1977 in Kimin, Seijosa, Balijan, Sher, Oyan, Roing, Kharsang and Jairampur. A network of schools later founded under the Vidya Bharati umbrella in the state carries names drawn from indigenous faiths, including Abotani, Donyi Polo, Rangfra and Manjushree Vidya Niketans. The RSS-affiliated Vanavasi Kalyan Ashram has promoted indigenous faiths in the state, and Talom Rukbo has been formally identified as one of the inspirations for that project.

Daughrity, writing in the International Bulletin of Mission Research, records that the Bharatiya Janata Party and RSS have encouraged the reinterpretation of local myths to integrate Arunachal Pradesh into India's sacred geography: the Idu Mishmi, for example, have been linked to Rukmini, a consort of Krishna, in efforts to fold the tribe's mythology into a pan-Hindu frame. He further reports that some Hindus argue that Donyi-Polo is a branch of Hinduism, and that this claim has gained ground in public discourse. A 2025 report in Christianity Today similarly describes the institutionalisation of Donyi-Polo as the most successful of several RSS-led efforts to revive tribal faiths in Arunachal Pradesh as a structured competitor to Christianity, with prayer centres and religious texts developed to reinforce tribal identity within a Hindu framework. A 2024 long-form piece in Outlook presents the Donyi-Polo movement as one of several tribal reform movements that the Sangh Parivar has incorporated, alongside the Heraka movement of the Zeliangrong Nagas.

In November 2024, leaders of indigenous faith organisations promoting Donyi-Polo met the RSS chief Mohan Bhagwat in Itanagar to press the state government to implement the long-dormant Arunachal Pradesh Freedom of Religion Act, 1978, against forced conversion to Christianity; the meeting has been cited in coverage as an example of the working relationship between Donyi-Polo institutions and Hindutva.

Sociologist Bhaswati Borgohain and indigenous scholar Mekory Dodum, writing in South Asia: Journal of South Asian Studies, argue that the institutionalisation of Donyi-Polo cannot be understood apart from the simultaneous pressures of Christianisation and Hindu religious nationalism, and that the new prayer halls being built across the state occupy a liminal cultural space between tradition and modernity in which the sacred is blended with a shifting socio-political identity.

=== Iconography and Saffronisation ===
An academic and journalistic literature documents the extent to which the institutionalised form of Donyi-Polo draws from Hinduism in its iconography, ritual idiom and architecture, in addition to from the older Tani tradition. Chaudhuri writes that many of the images generated by the revival are largely Hinduised idols, with some local features added to suit their mythical characters, and that in the name of reviving an indigenous tribal religion the movement has, in his view, imposed Hinduised norms either consciously or in disguised form. A 2024 linguistic study of neighbouring Kera'a (Idu Mishmi) ritual language by Erika Sandman likewise observes that the Donyi-Polo belief system encodes older traditional beliefs superimposed by a Hindu spiritual framework.

Until the late twentieth century, the Tani supreme principle was not represented in figurative form; altars were erected temporarily for specific rituals, and there were no permanent idols or designated houses of worship. Following the revival, anthropomorphic images of formerly formless deities began to appear. Among the Tangsa, Rangfrah, previously a formless spirit, was given a Shiva-like iconography with a Mongoloid face; comparable transformations have been documented for Donyi-Polo, Amik Matai Ringya Jawmallu, Nani Intaya and Nyezi-No. Statues of Donyi-Polo modelled in river pebbles were among the earliest figural representations installed at the Naharlagun temple by the lay devotee Gongam Kamsi during the 1990s.

Ritual practice in the new prayer halls has also incorporated Hindu elements not previously found in traditional Tani worship, including the lighting of oil lamps and incense sticks before images or idols, congregational devotional singing in front of a sanctum, and the placement of pictorial deities in formal shrines. According to Borgohain and Dodum, the architecture and weekly schedule of the gangging, nyedar namlo and meder nello prayer halls draw on both Hindu temple and Christian church models: services are typically held on Sundays with congregants seated in segregated rows singing standardised hymns, a pattern they identify as not present in pre-revival Tani practice. The movement has also reorganised the older orthography of the divinity's name, with revivalists writing Donyi and Polo as a single fused word Donyipolo to express the doctrine that the divine is one force manifesting in plural forms; Doley 2022 describes this innovation as closer to formalised theistic systems than to traditional shamanic usage.

Some indigenous leaders associated with the movement have themselves discussed this shift. Pai Dawe, president of the Nyishi Indigenous Faith and Cultural Society and vice-chairman of the Donyi Polo Cultural and Charitable Trust, told the long-form magazine Fifty Two that there were certain differences, but that the movement had inclined toward Sanatana Dharma philosophies because of perceived similarities. Other Nyishi figures interviewed in the same report, including Government College of Seppa principal R. Hissang, expressed concern that the portrayal of the movement as falling within the fold of Hinduism is the design of external forces rather than a reflection of authentic Nyishi belief.

=== Points of structural similarity with Hinduism ===
Alongside the institutional borrowings, several theological motifs of Donyi-Polo in its formalised version bear structural resemblance to Hindu ideas, a point that has been raised both by Hindu nationalist commentators arguing for inclusion and by some Donyi-Polo theologians arguing for distinctness. The Sun (Donyi) and Moon (Polo) are venerated as a complementary female and male pair in a manner analogous to the Surya and Chandra worship of the Vedic tradition, and the Sun occupies a position comparable to that of Surya as a witness to truth and an enforcer of moral order. Talom Rukbo's later theology, in which all phenomena issue from a primordial Keyum (void or nothingness) through the polar action of Donyi-Polo, has been read as paralleling Hindu and Buddhist accounts of emergence from a non-dual source. Both traditions include reverence for nature, the maintenance of cosmic balance, and the use of fire and offerings in ritual; these features have been cited during the revival period by Hindutva interlocutors in support of the argument that Donyi-Polo is a regional expression of Hinduism rather than a religion of its own.

=== Scholarly assessment ===
The body of Donyi-Polo studies that has developed since the 2000s has produced an increasingly critical literature in which the movement is treated less as a survival of indigenous religion than as a constructed identity project. Several themes recur across the published sources.

Many of the researchers state that the institutional forms of Donyi-Polo were the work of an educated Tani elite, chief among them Talom Rukbo, rather than a continuous popular tradition, and that the move from diffuse shamanic practice to a codified "religion" was itself a modernising intervention. They had similarly hold that the movement was driven by the need to respond to Christian conversion, and that the forms it took (Sunday services, hymn books, congregational worship, fixed sanctuaries) were drawn from Christianity and from Hinduism rather than from older Tani practice.

Hindutva influence on content and organisation is a further theme. It was observed that the religion in its present form is "precisely influenced by the Hindutva ideology" and has been incorporated into a wider Sangh Parivar strategy of presenting tribal faiths as components of Sanatana Dharma. Many sources document the introduction of Hindu-style anthropomorphic idols for entities previously held to be formless, and the introduction of Hinduised ritual norms in the context of the revival. Reporting from Roads & Kingdoms (2018) and the Pulitzer Center (2021) records that the spontaneous, ecstatic and often female-led shamanic practices that characterised pre-revival worship now sit alongside the more decorous, scripted, male-led congregational forms favoured by the institutional movement, and that some of the older practices have been displaced.

A 2025 commentary in The Arunachal Times raises a longer-term concern that, in seeking to preserve itself, Donyi-Poloism may be reshaped into a regional component of a larger national religious identity, with the erosion of its distinct cosmological foundations. Daughrity (2022) and Borgohain and Dodum (2023) state that the official census figure undercounts followers because Donyi-Polo is not separately listed, with the result that practitioners are often classed as Hindu and absorbed statistically into the very category their movement was meant to resist. Dangmei (2019) and Outlook (2024) place Donyi-Polo alongside the Heraka movement of the Zeliangrong Nagas as comparable instances in which indigenous reform movements, originally directed against both Christianity and Hinduism, have in recent decades become closely associated with Hindu nationalism.

The historian Udayon Misra and the political scientist Arkotong Longkumer have offered broader frames within which these movements may be read. Misra's India's North-East: Identity Movements, State and Civil Society (2014) argues that the revival of indigenous faiths in the region cannot be separated from contests over the state and over the meaning of "indigeneity" itself, while Longkumer's monograph on the Heraka argues that "tradition" is selectively reinvented to legitimise reform in the moment of contact with world religions, a framework that Dangmei applies directly to Donyi-Polo.

=== Political context ===
The institutional growth of Donyi-Polo has been linked to state-level politics, particularly to the history of the Arunachal Pradesh Freedom of Religion Act (APFRA), 1978. Passed by the first Legislative Assembly of the then Union Territory in 1978, the Act prohibits religious conversion by force, inducement or fraud, defines "indigenous faiths" to include Buddhism among certain tribes, Vaishnavism among others and nature worship including Donyi-Polo, and prescribes imprisonment of up to two years and a fine of up to ₹10,000. The Act remained dormant for nearly five decades because the state government did not frame implementing rules.

From the late 2010s the BJP-led state government moved to operationalise the law, and Donyi-Polo organisations such as the Indigenous Faith and Cultural Society of Arunachal Pradesh (IFCSAP) have been among its supporters. The IFCSAP general secretary Maya Murtem has described the Act as "armour" against conversions, and IFCSAP president Emi Rumi has called its implementation a matter of survival for indigenous faiths. Critics, including Christian organisations, the Congress in the state and several legal commentators, argue that the Act is in practice directed at restricting evangelism rather than protecting all faiths equally, and that its definition of indigenous faiths effectively privileges Donyi-Polo and Hindu-aligned categories. A November 2024 meeting in Itanagar between Donyi-Polo leaders and Mohan Bhagwat, the chief of the RSS, was widely reported in connection with this push, and has been cited as further evidence of the working relationship between the institutional Donyi-Polo movement and Hindu nationalist organisations.

== Places of worship ==
=== Gangging ===
A gangging is the general term for a Donyi-Polo prayer place, especially in Adi areas. As a sacred enclosure, the gangging is a concept popularised by the Donyi-Polo Yelam Kebang since 1996, and is therefore an institution of the revival period rather than a pre-existing tradition. The first major Donyi-Polo temple was built by Talom Rukbo at Pasighat in 1989, and by the mid-2010s the network of associated prayer places had grown to around four hundred centres.

According to Talom Rukbo, the word gangging derives from Gangging Siring, the notion of a sacred land or holy tree that mediates between the spiritual and natural worlds and from which everything, living or non-living, comes into being.

Gangging congregants are expected to observe certain rules: male members sit cross-legged on the left in rows, female members on the right. No noise other than the sound of the hymns is permitted during prayer. Sunday prayers are central to the weekly cycle, and all the village-level gangging branches in the Siang area are centrally regulated by the Donyi-Polo Yelam Kebang. These prayer halls have served as the means by which the codified rituals, practices and new iconographies of the gods and goddesses have been disseminated.

=== Nyedar namlo ===
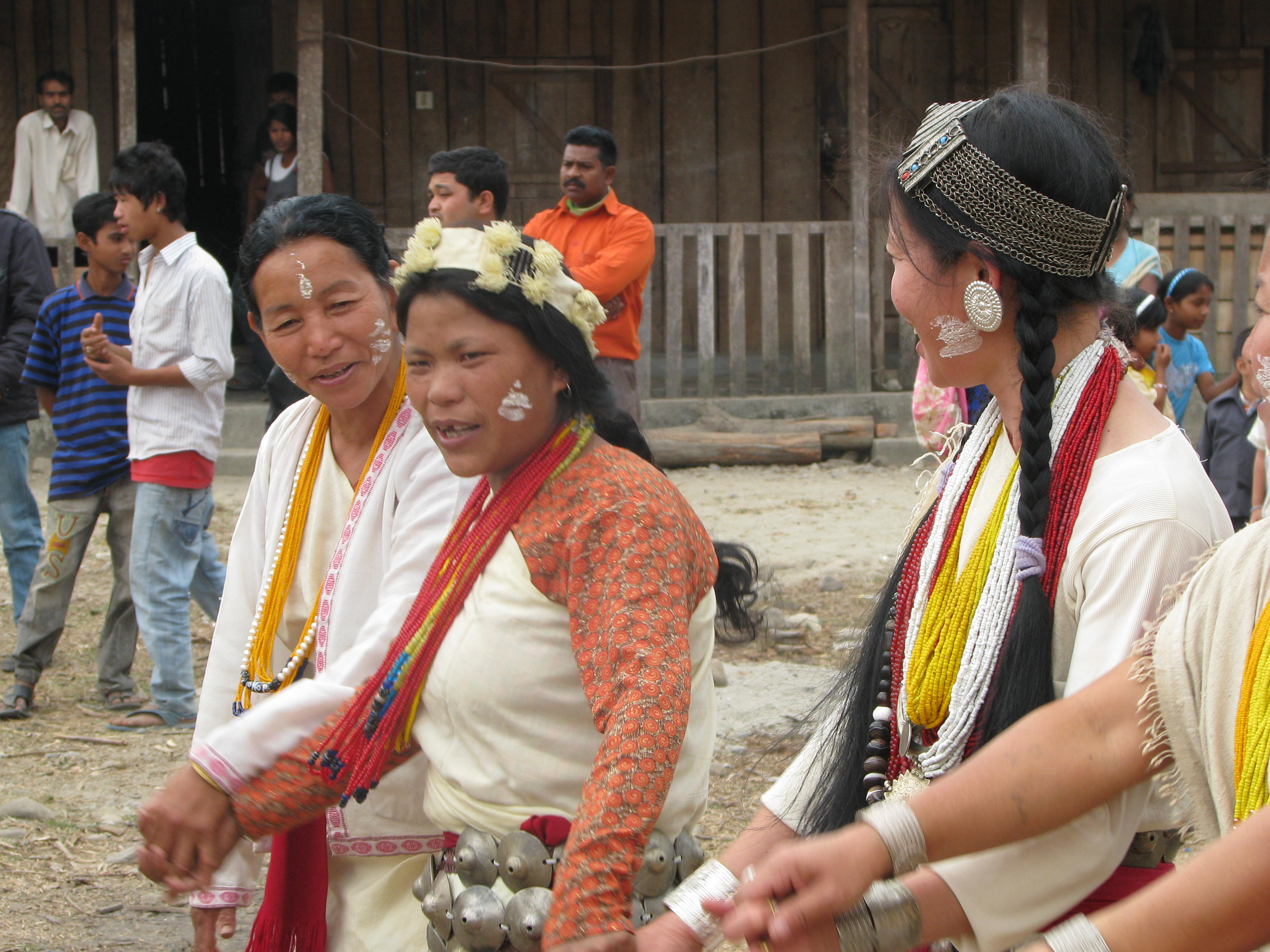
Nyishi women dancing during the annual festival, Nyokum Yullo.

Nyedar namlo is the Nyishi place of worship. Most were built from the late twentieth century onwards as part of the revivalist movement in the eastern part of Arunachal Pradesh. According to Borgohain and Dodum, their material and non-material culture borrows elements from both Christianity and Hinduism. The same authors describe these places as occupying a liminal space between tradition and modernity in which the sacred and spiritual blend with the social and cultural identity of the indigenous tribes, all of which are in transition.

=== Ethnic variations ===
In Galo areas, prayer places and community halls (dere) have been built under the patronage of the Donyi-Polo Welfare Association since the 2000s. Priests (nyibu) conduct prayers there on Sundays. The Galo prayer place, known as Gamgi, is similar in form to the Adi gangging: male members sit on the left in rows and female members on the right, cross-legged, and the prayers are held on Sundays. In Apatani areas the religion is called "Danyi-Piilo" and prayer places are called meder nello ("purified place"); the first such hall was built in 2004, and songs and prayers are collected in a book called Lyambope. Among the Nyishi, Donyi-Polo prayer places are called nyedar namlo ("pure place"), and the movement only began among them in the early 2000s.

The Donyi-Polo movement has subsequently crossed Tani cultural borders, with related developments including the rise of Rangfraism among the Tangsa, Amik-Matai Ringya-Jawmalo among the Miju and Digaro Mishmi in Anjaw and Lohit, and Intayaism among the Idu Mishmi in Changlang and Dibang Valley. Chaudhuri (2013) notes that these derivative movements received the same overt or covert support from Hindu nationalist organisations as the original Donyi-Polo movement.

== Theology and cosmology ==
The theology presented here is that of the formalised revival, which draws on older Tani concepts and also adds and reorganises material to form a coherent doctrine.

=== Sedi and Keyum ===
In the formalised Donyi-Polo belief system, the fountain god that begets the universe is referred to as Sedi by the Minyong and Padam and as Jimi by the Galo. All things and beings are held to be parts of the body of Sedi: at creation his hair became the plants of the earth, his tears the rain and waters, his bones the rocks and stones, and his two eyes Donyi (the Sun) and Polo (the Moon). After the act of creation Sedi withdraws as a deus otiosus but continues to observe creation through his eyes, his double aspect veiling, unveiling, and finally revealing himself.

In Galo belief, Jimi manifests as Melo (Sky) and Sidi (Earth), out of whose interaction all things and beings, including Donyi and Polo, are born. Other myths offer alternative interpretations of the duality of Donyi and Polo.

According to Talom Rukbo's theology, all celestial bodies, including the Earth, and all things in existence, originate from one source: Keyum (nothingness, or the vacuum). Donyi-Polo is the polar force that generates all stars; the physical Sun and Moon visible from Earth, Bomong and Boo, are bodily manifestations of this unseen universal power, with Bomong embodying the centralising force of Donyi and Boo the life-giving force of Polo.

=== Donyi and Polo ===
Donyi (Sun) and Polo (Moon), respectively female and male in the Tibeto-Burman tradition, are addressed as Ane Donyi ("Mother Sun") and Abu Polo ("Father Moon"). The pair forms a notion structurally analogous to the yin and yang of Chinese culture and is the conceptual lens through which the Divinity (Sedi) is described. They are held to represent the way in which the divine principle manifests itself in nature, providing harmony and balance in the alternation of light and darkness, heat and cool, and unity and multiplicity (analogous to the daytime sky and the night sky).

The practical expression of the faith is found in everyday speech and action. Believers refer to themselves as Donyi O, Polo Ome, "children of the Sun and the Moon". When in distress a believer invokes Donyi-Polo. A man falsely accused of lying calls out Donyi-e!, "oh Sun!" These expressions reflect the belief that Donyi-Polo upholds the world providently, rewarding the righteous and punishing wrongdoers. The divine pair is revered as the highest holy presence governing fate.

"Donyi-Polo" is also used in the sense of "truth" in sacral speech, and serves as the epitome of wisdom, enlightenment, right conscience, truthfulness and selflessness. Aware persons are called Donyi-Polo Ome ("children of truth") and elders are addressed as Donyi-Polo Abu ("representatives of the truth").

=== Gods ===
The followers of Donyi-Poloism worship a variety of gods and goddesses associated with elements of nature. These deities are said to share in the universal balance of Donyi and Polo and to be multiple manifestations or identities of Sedi and Donyi-Polo, each with specific functions and roles. They are held to watch over the earth and humanity. The main deities in the institutionalised pantheon are Donyi and Polo, Kine Nane, Doying Bote, Pedong Nane and Guumin Soyin.

== Abotani ==
Tani-speaking peoples (Lhoba, Tagin, Galo, Nyishi, Nah, Apatani, Mishing and Adi) share a myth of common descent from the progenitor Abotani. Other Tibeto-Burman peoples of Arunachal Pradesh who participate in the Donyi-Polo movement do not subscribe to descent from Abotani.

In the formalised theology, Abotani is taken to represent the evolution of the human being from the source, Donyi and Sedi, the eye of the universe being held to be as essential to humanity as the eye is to the body. The Divinity is held to have projected the human being and shown him the right path.

== Conscience and ethics ==
Donyi-Poloists describe the Donyi-Polo character of the universe as the eyes of the human conscience. Happiness is held to come through right action, and right action is defined as that which follows the order of nature (Donyi-Polo).

Oshang Ering, a philosopher of the religion, has written that just as Bomong and Boo provide the light that enables physical sight, Donyi-Polo makes humans aware of right and wrong. Right conscience is said to naturally prevail; when a person acts against the natural order and tries to conceal or rebrand the act as good, the force of conscience (Donyi-Polo) is held to exert a psychological pressure and the wrongdoer is said to lose happiness.

According to the doctrine, love, compassion, equality and selflessness are naturally ordained by Donyi-Polo and are inscribed in nature. The ethical dimension of Donyi-Polo also encompasses purity, beauty, simplicity and frankness.

== Demographics ==
Historical population
Year	Pop.	±%
1971	36,954	—
1981	218,489	+491.2%
1991	279,450	+27.9%
2001	302,928	+8.4%
2011	331,370	+9.4%
Source: Census of India

The growth of recorded adherents between 1971 and 2011 corresponds with the institutionalisation drive launched by Talom Rukbo and the Donyi-Polo Yelam Kebang, with the number rising from around 37,000 in 1971 to over 331,000 in 2011. A persistent issue affecting the figures is the absence of a dedicated religion code in the Indian census: according to Daughrity, a number of practising Donyi-Polo followers report themselves as Hindu because Donyi-Polo is not separately listed and respondents tend to prefer "Hindu" over the residual "other" category. Borgohain, Dodum & (2023) describe the same census architecture as effectively absorbing the population that the Donyi-Polo movement was created to keep distinct.

Adherents of Donyi-Polo, 2011 census
1. Nyishi (22.2%)
2. Galo (16.1%)
3. Adi (13.6%)
4. Tagin (13.6%)
5. Apatani (9.40%)
6. Adi minyong (6.02%)
7. Adi gallong (3.12%)
8. Nissi (2.72%)
9. Adi padam (2.33%)
10. Other (10.8%)

== See also ==
- Tribal religions in India
- Bathouism
- Indigenous religion
- New religious movement
- Sanamahism
- Sarnaism
- Arunachal Pradesh Freedom of Religion Act
- Vanavasi Kalyan Ashram
