= Lishipa tribe =

Tribal group in Arunachal Pradesh, India

The Lishipa is a tribal group found in the Dirang area in the West Kameng district of Arunachal Pradesh in India.

== Origin ==
They are ethnically related to both the Chugpa and Monpa, in which they are officially classified as a tribe of the Monpa.

However, the relative affinity of their linguistic origins to the Sherdukpen, Sulung and Bugun that rendered their distinct identity from the Monpas. The tribe boasts about 1,000 individuals.
