= Padam dialect =

Mishing dialect of India

Padam
- Bor-abor
- Native to: India
- Region: Arunachal Pradesh, Assam
- Ethnicity: Padam
- Native speakers: c. 40,000 (2007)
- Language family: Sino-Tibetan: Tani; East Tani; Mising; Padam

Language codes
- ISO 639-3: None (mis)
- Glottolog: pada1257
- ELP: Padam
- Padam is classified as Definitely Endangered by the UNESCO Atlas of the World's Languages in Danger.

Padam, also known as Bor-abor, is a dialect of the Mising language.

== Phonology ==
The Padam dialect consists of the following phonemes:

=== Consonants ===
| | | Labial | Alveolar | Palatal | Velar |
|---|---|---|---|---|---|
| Nasal | | m | n | ɲ | ŋ |
| Plosive/ Affricate | voiceless | p | t | | k |
| Plosive/ Affricate | voiced | b | d | dʒ | ɡ |
| Fricative | | | s | (ʃ) | |
| Trill | | | r | | |
| Approximant | | | l | j | |

- /s/ can also be heard as a palatal fricative [ʃ].

=== Vowels ===
| | Front | Central | Back |
|---|---|---|---|
| Close | i | ɨː | u uː |
| Mid | e | əː | o |
| Open | | a | ɑː |
