= Milang tribe =

Tribe of the Adi people of Arunachal Pradesh and Assam, India

The Milang tribe (alternately Millang, Malaa, or Holon) are a tribe of the Adi people of Arunachal Pradesh and nearby Jonai, in Assam, India.

== Etymology ==
The term Milang is an exonym, used by non-members of the tribe to refer to the tribe. Members of the tribe prefer the name Malaa.
