= Minyong people =

Sub-group of the Adi people of Arunachal Pradesh

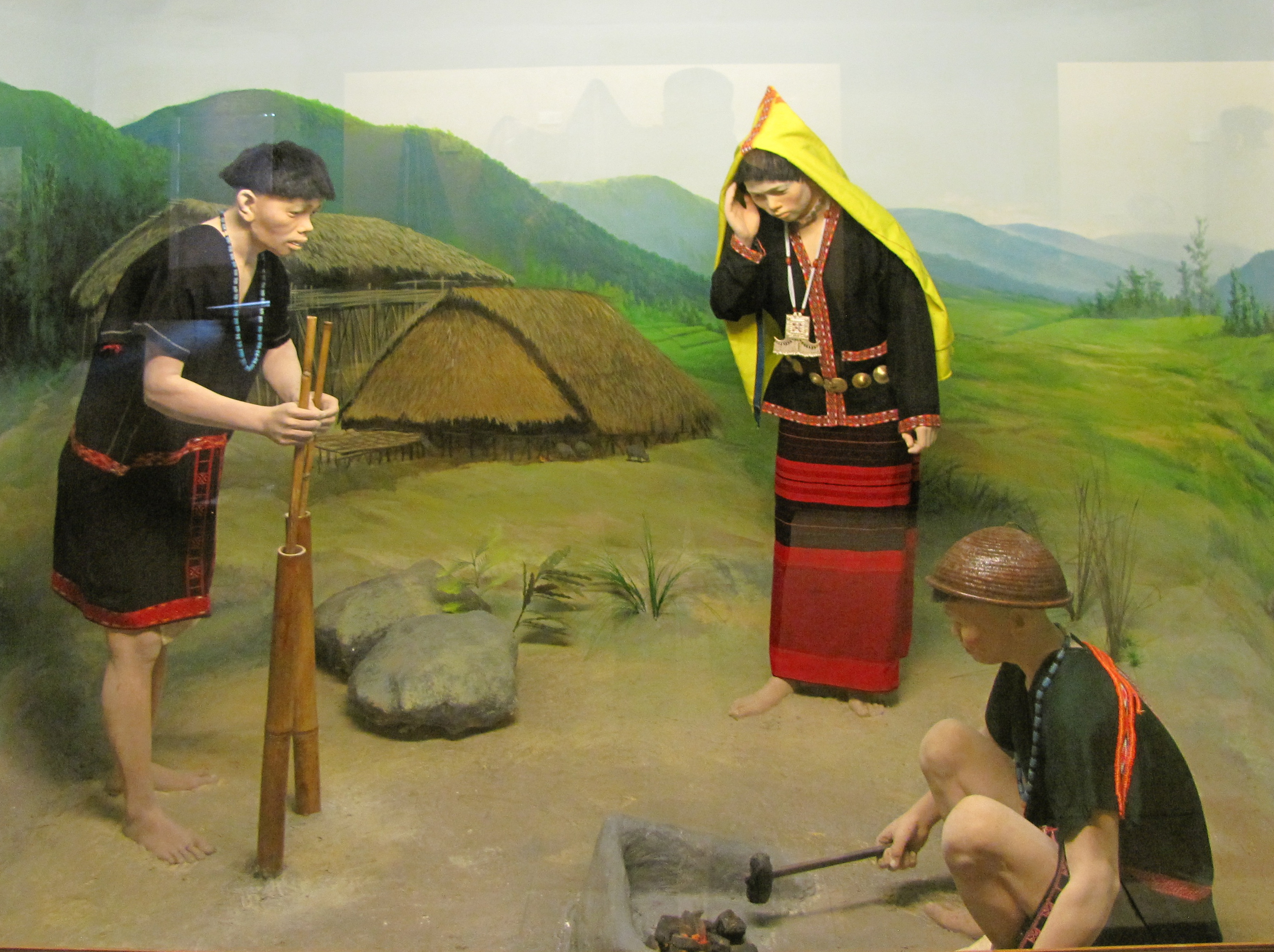
Diorama and wax figures of Adi Minyong people in Jawaharlal Nehru Museum, Itanagar

The Minyong are a sub-group of the Adi people, a tribal people living in Arunachal Pradesh, India. The Minyong are found in East Siang, Siang and West Siang district. They consider Donyi-Polo as their religion but there has been conversion to Christianity.

Like any other tribes of Adi they celebrate Solung, Aran and Etor as their festivals.

Minyong like other Tani group name their offspring with prefix 'Ta' for male and 'Ya' for female, e.g. Tapang for a boy and Yaman for a girl. This practice has been abandoned recently.

== Distribution ==
They have originated from Riga Village. Their villages are mostly found on the right bank of river Siang (Brahmaputra), starting from Riga village to plains of Assam, Jonai.

== History ==
Minyong people are known for their bravery as they have fought war against British Expedition to the hilly region in late 19th century. They are a large sub tribe of The Adis and considered as fearsome warriors of the hills.
