= Takpa people =

Subgroup of Mongpa people

The Takpa is a sub-group of the Monpa people, while the southern sub-group is identified as the Tshangla. Monpas of the Takpa group are found in Tawang and Dirang of Arunachal Pradesh, India, Cuona of Tibet as well as Trashigang in Bhutan.
