= Hruso people =

Ethnic group living in Arunachal Pradesh, Northeast India

Aka
Hrusso

Total population
- 8,167 (2011 census)

Regions with significant populations
- Arunachal Pradesh (West Kameng)

Languages
- Hruso

Religion
- Hinduism, Buddhism, traditional religions (Nyezi-No)

Related ethnic groups
- Miji

The Aka, also known as Hrusso, are an ethnic group native to the Indian state of Arunachal Pradesh. They are found in various areas of Arunachal Pradesh including the Thrizino Bhalukpong, Buragaon, Jamiri, Palizi, Khuppi area in West Kameng. Their language belongs to the Tibeto-Burman family.

== Lifestyle ==
For the convenience of administration, the Aka people elect a chief, who often acts the role of the village headman. Polygamy is widely practiced in their patrilineal society, and cross-cousin marriages are accepted. Like most tribes, the Aka have an elementary caste system, the aristocrat Kutsun and the commoner Kevatsum.

The Aka practice shifting cultivation and rear domestic animals such as the Mithun. Temporary huts, accommodated by young boys, are built near the field to guard the crops from the animals. The staple food of Akas is maize and millet. They plant leaves, pulses, potato and rice. Drinks locally made from fermented maize and millet include Lao pani, Mingri and the Aarah.

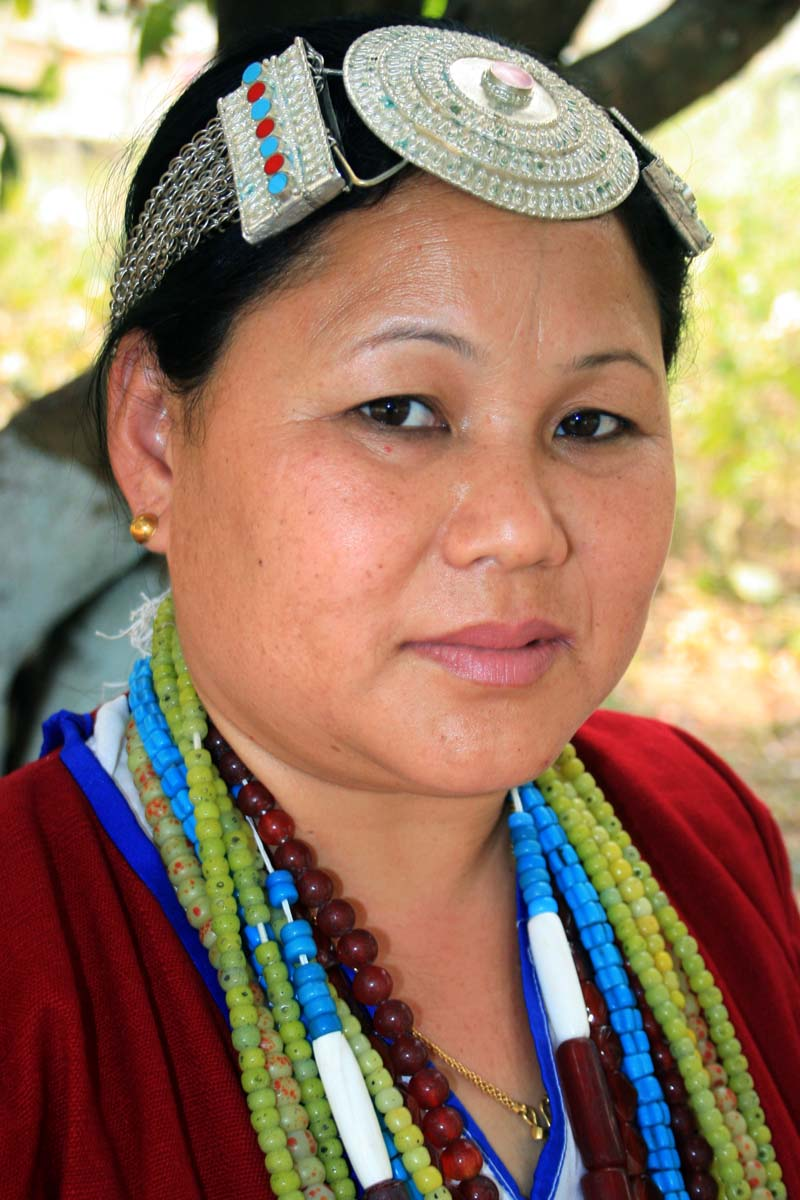
Aka tribe of Arunachal Pradesh

The Aka live in elongated houses made from bamboo, wood and cane leaves. Raised on platforms about 6 feet above the ground, the Aka houses are further subdivided into three sections. The granary is built away from the main house.

== Culture ==
The Aka share strong cultural affinities with the Miji, and intermarriage with the Miji is prevalent. Centuries of Vaishnava and intermittent Tibetan influence from the Sherdukpen has shaped the Aka culture into its modern form. Handicrafts, basket weaving and wood carving are the principal arts among the Aka tribe. Intermittent Tibetan contacts are evidenced by the fact that the Aka and Mishmis are known as "Khakhra" (meaning barbarians) to the Tibetans.

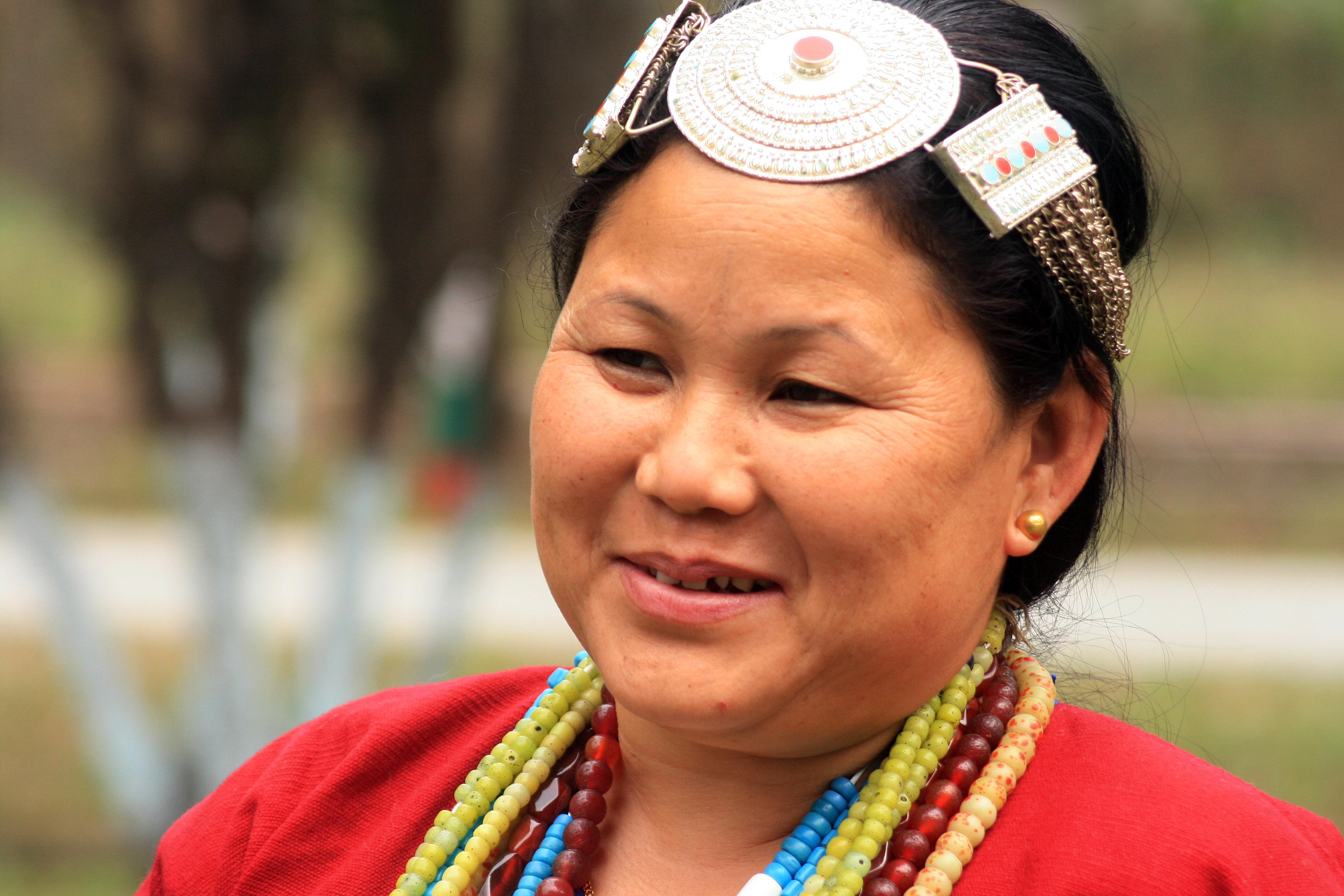
Aka Lady of Arunachal Pradesh

One of the most notable features of Aka art is the Chinese design of the Jana flower, which can often be found on many of the indigenous haversacks. It is a known legend that the Jana flower represents commemorating an ancient Tibetan king, who was believed to have led his entire life through daily reincarnations. It was also believed that he lived in an open, giant palace that grew the Jana flowers every time the sun set.

Indigenous festivals under the guidance of a village Chieftain, such as those of the four-day Nechido festival, held in November, involve affiliation with the natural world and community.

=== Dual language ===
Among the Aka live a second group of people, with their own language, the Koro. They are culturally integrated with the Aka, but have somehow maintained their separate, only distantly related Tibeto-Burman language. Koro has more similarities with the Tani language group, in easternmost Tibet. There are thought to be 800 to 1200 remaining speakers of Koro, and 4,000 to 6,000 speakers of Aka.

== Costume ==
The Aka costume deeply reflects its indigenous culture. While both males and females keep long hair, there are distinctions in the dress within the Aka. These restrictions involve the use of the Assamese silk and the Tibetan knobbed hat, which are worn among the aristocrats.

Generally, most men wear a silky Assamese toga, while the women wear a long, dark-red garment that covers the entire body. Indigenous lingchong cream, manufactured from pine resin, serves as a cosmetic for the Aka women. However, the interesting cane cap reaching three inches high, inserted with two bird feathers, serves as the highlight of the Aka costume.

Silver ornaments play another important role in the female Aka costume. Vase-shaped earrings and, for the richer ones, a fillet of silver chain is worn around the head. The rich Aka women wear a pretty filet of silver chain-work around the head. Jade beads are also made into necklaces.

Face tattooing is another notable feature among some Aka. Especially in the case of the women, they tattoo their faces in a straight line from the forehead to the chin.

== Religion ==
The Aka are mainly Animists–who are described to follow a variant of the Nyezi-No religion, which means Sky and Earth. Occasional contacts with the Assamese and neighbouring Buddhist tribes and Tibetans have seen Hindu and Buddhist influence imbibed beliefs and culture. However, centuries of Buddhist and Hindu influences have greatly shaped the religious rites of their religion. For instance, veneration of the Assamese Hindu God, Hori Deo came as a result of the imprisonment of a local Aka king, Tagi Raja. Superstitions and magic play an important role in their belief system. Shizhou proved to be the most popular form of magic ritual among the Aka, and anybody who is angry may resort to conducting Shizhou rituals on their foe.

The rituals of Shizhou involve slaughtering a dog, draining the blood from its head, and either sprinkling a few drops of the blood onto the enemy undetected, throwing them into his house, or burning them in his hearth. If the ritual succeeds, the enemy is supposed to lose their life.
