= Miji people =

Ethnic group of Arunachal Pradesh, India

Sajolang (Miji)
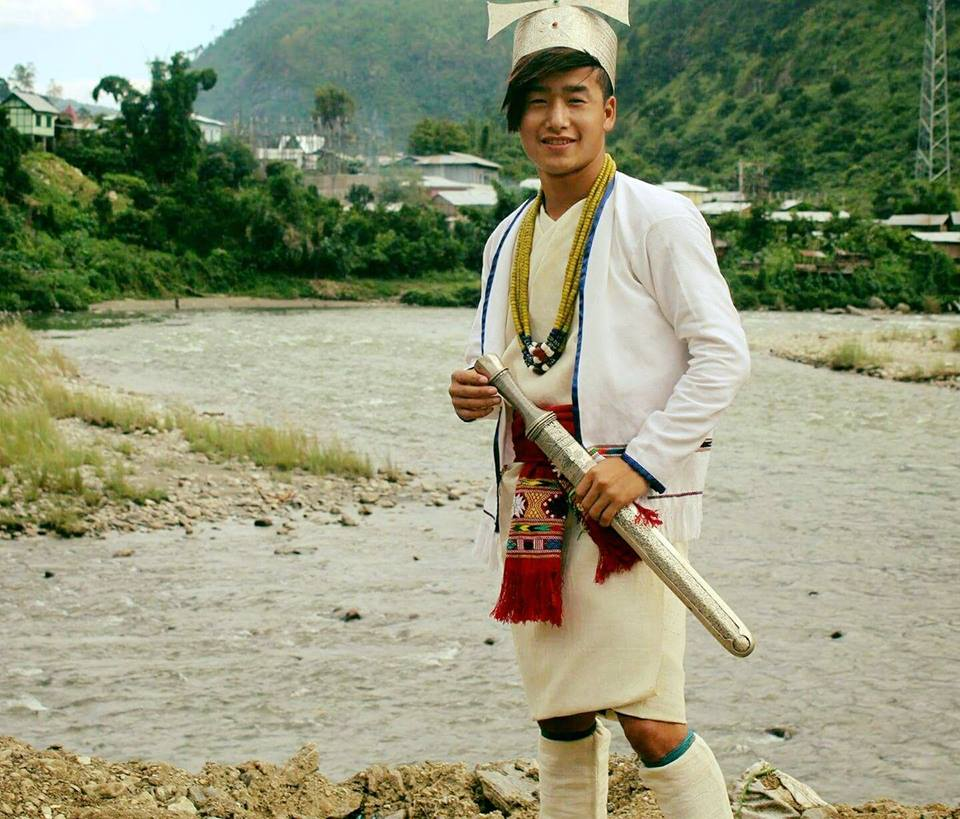
- A young Miji man

Total population
- 37000 (approx.)

Regions with significant populations
- West Kameng, East Kameng & Kurung Kumey districts of Arunachal Pradesh in India and Longzi County, Shannan Prefecture in China

Languages
- Miji, Bengru, Sajolang, Damai

Religion
- Christianity, Animism, Shamanism

Related ethnic groups
- Abotani, Tani people

The Miji, (or Sajolang) are a social group of Arunachal Pradesh, India. They are located in various districts of Arunachal Pradesh including the West Kameng, East Kameng and Kurung Kumey. Their population of 37,000 are found near the lower parts of the sub-Himalayan hills bordering Assam; they speak the Sajalong language.

== Dress ==
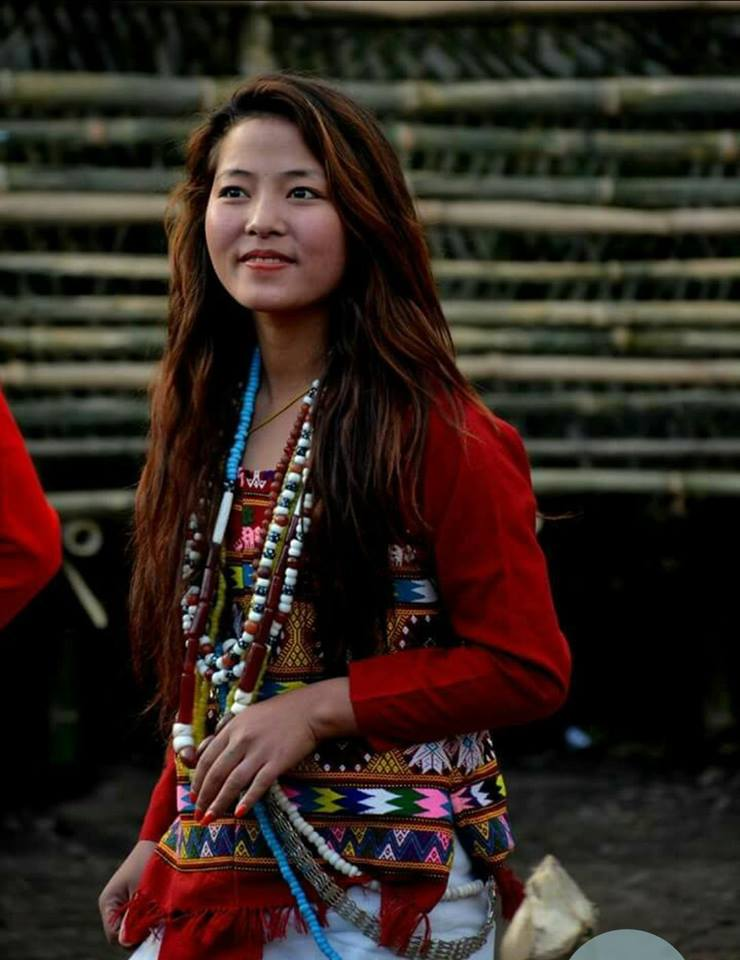
A young Miji girl from East Kameng

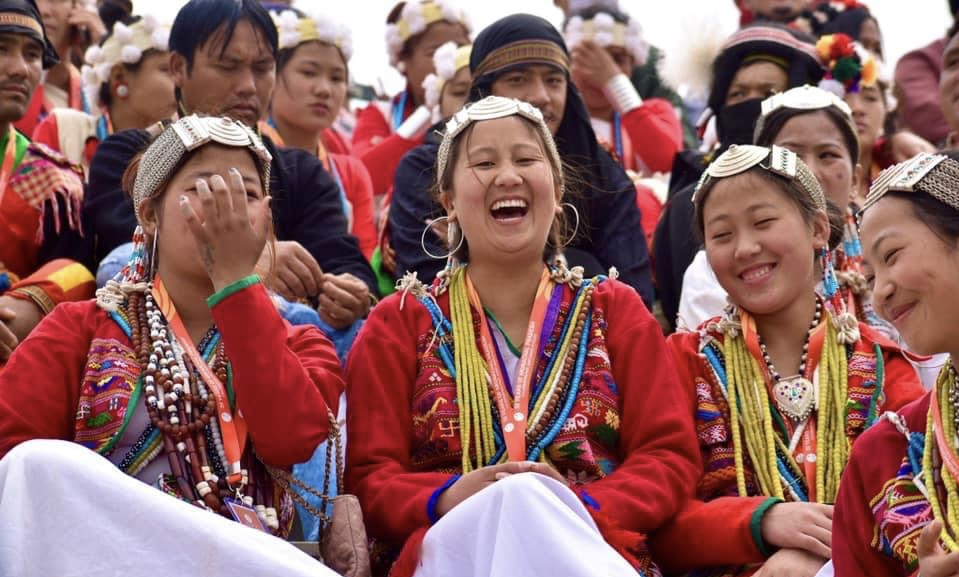
Miji women

The traditional costume of Miji women consists of an ankle-length white garment with a beautifully decorated red jacket. Unlike the majority of other tribes of Arunachal Pradesh, India; the Miji people wear silver ornaments, and glass/brass based necklaces. Indigenous cosmetics are made from pine resin and coal ( specially during marriage ceremonies).

== Religion ==
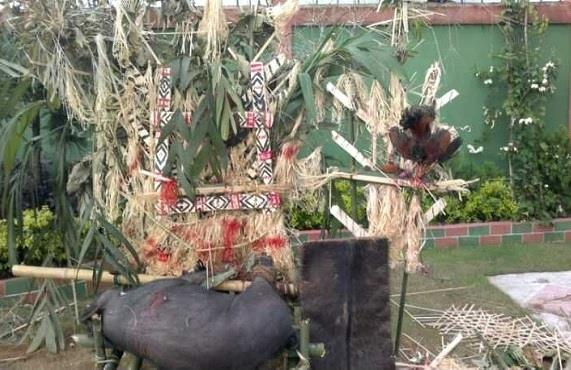
A sacrificial altar of the Bengru tribe

Most Miji are adherents of Animism, although a few have adopted Christianity. The Mijis practise a distinct religion which rely entirely on nature and god ( nature- being the replica of god. The supreme deity worshipped is Zhanglhang-Miungzhin; Mijis believe that god prevail in every aspects of nature, such as trees, water tributaries and even stones. Chindang, marked every 15 October, is considered the main festival of the Mijis, inhabiting the Lada circle of the East Kameng district, Sarli region of the Kurung Kumey district and Nafra and Bomdila Sub-Division of the West Kameng district with a few of them also found in the Assam-Arunachal border towns of Sessa and Bhalukpong who settled down there some time ago because of better access to facilities. Culturally and linguistically, the Miji and Hrusso Akas form a cognate group. Their ancestors are called Bor(Robo), or the brother of Tanis, like the Nyishis, Apatanis, Tagins, Galos and the Adis which share common features but are also distinct in themselves. Robo being the elder brother and Nyibo (tani) being younger are actual brothers, who belonged to same father.

There is some Buddhist influence as a result of long-standing cultural contacts with Buddhist tribes to the west, and the celebration of Losar as well as the usage of prayer flags are some indicators of this.
