= Chugpa tribe =

Monpa subtribe of Arunachal Pradesh, India

The Chugpa is a small subtribe of the Monpa community of Arunachal Pradesh.
