= Tani peoples =

Sino-Tibetan ethnic group from India

Tani
Tani
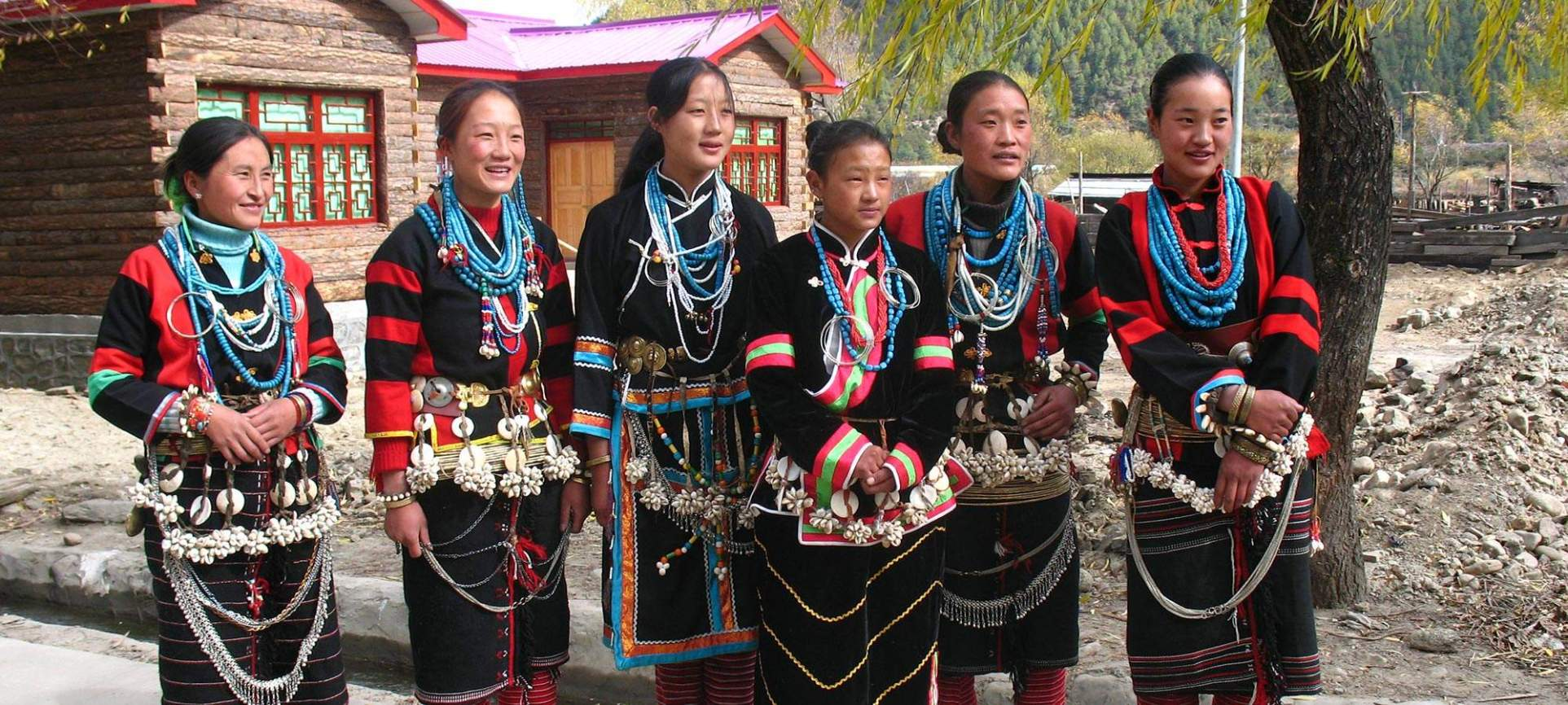

Regions with significant populations
- India: 1,380,878
- China: 10,000

Languages
- Tani languages, Hindi

Religion
- Donyi-Polo, Christianity, Buddhism, Hinduism

Related ethnic groups
- Other Tibeto-Burman people

The Tani people include the Adi, Apatani, Galo, Mising, Nyishi, and Tagin ethnic groups of India and China. They speak various Tani languages and primarily reside in the Indian states of Arunachal Pradesh and Assam, as well as the Tibet Autonomous Region in China.

The Tani population is approximately 1.3 million.

== See also ==
- List of people of Tani descent
- Lego clan
