= Padam people =

Subtribe of Adi Tribe

Padam is a sub-tribe of Adi, which speaks one of the Sino-Tibetan languages. They were a nomadic warrior race and used to have a reputation as fierce warriors among all the clans in Arunachal Pradesh. They are believed to have migrated to present Arunachal Pradesh from Tibet.

== Distribution ==
They inhabits the region of Upper Siang, East Siang, Lower Dibang Valley and parts of Lohit and Namsai districts of Arunachal Pradesh

== Geography ==
Although it is almost 70 kilometres (43 mi) from Pasighat, their land resides in the Upper Siang district, throughout the Lower Dibang Valley, and makes up about 50 percent of the Lohit district. Their indigenous land is watered by the Yamne River flowing through the valley.

== Culture ==
They were originally nomadic people but usually grow their food, mainly rice. The Padam people eat birds and animals, such as pigs, cows, and mithun. They are great hunters and usually have licensed guns and eyok (long metal swords).

Padam men wear different varieties of clothes and costumes. Traditional clothing for men includes red, blue, brown or black coats with various designs & patterns mostly Tibetan manufactured and a cotton cloth on the bottom, varieties of bamboo helmets decorated with boar teeth, bear hairs or red-dyed yak tails, and naturally colored stones worn as a necklace called tadok. Men may also carry different varieties of yoksa (Tibetan swords) and daggers with tigers' teeth attached to the strap of the sword. Padam women wear a gale on top of their heads, a black cotton cloth with gale on the bottom, and necklaces called sondorong as part of their traditional dress.

Padam people have their major festival as Solung Lune, Solung Etor or Solung Lutor and Unying Aaran.

== See also ==
- Adi-Padam language
