= Adi people =

Ethnic group of Tibet and Northeast India

Adi
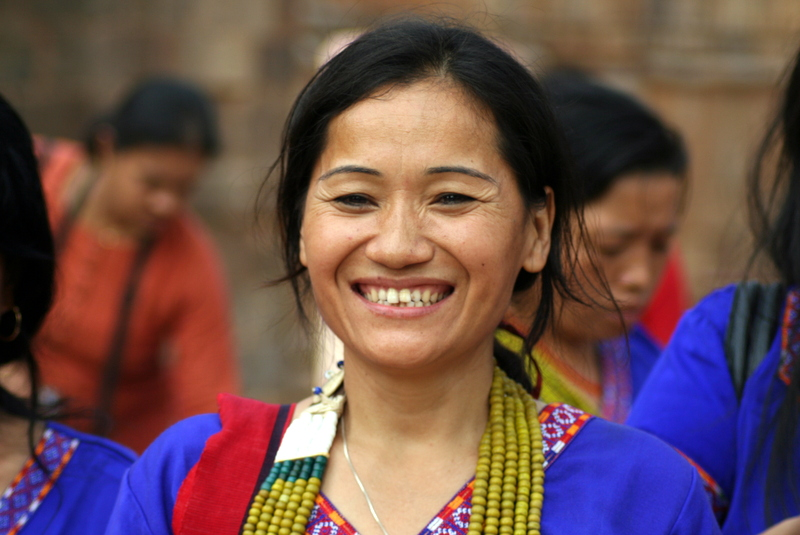
- Portrait of Adi Tribals from Arunachal Pradesh

Regions with significant populations
- India: N/A
- Arunachal Pradesh: N/A
- China: N/A
- Tibet Autonomous Region: N/A

Languages
- Tani

Religion
- Majority: Donyi-Polo; Minority: Christianity, Buddhism

Related ethnic groups
- Tani people, Lhoba people, Mishing people

The Adi people are an indigenous ethnic group primarily inhabiting the Indian state of Arunachal Pradesh, with smaller populations in neighboring regions.

== Notable people ==
- Tapir Gao, Indian politician
- Ninong Ering, Indian politician
- Daying Ering, Indian politician
- Talom Rukbo, Spiritualist and founder of Donyi Polo movement
- Mamang Dai, Poet
- Gegong Apang, Politician
- Omak Apang, Politician
- Jomin Tayeng, IAS officer
- Oken Tayeng, Politician
- Jarbom Gamlin, Former chief minister of Arunachal Pradesh

== See also ==
- List of people of Tani descent
