= Chiumo =

Mountain peak between India and China

Kawang Gyang
- Chiumo (Tibetan)
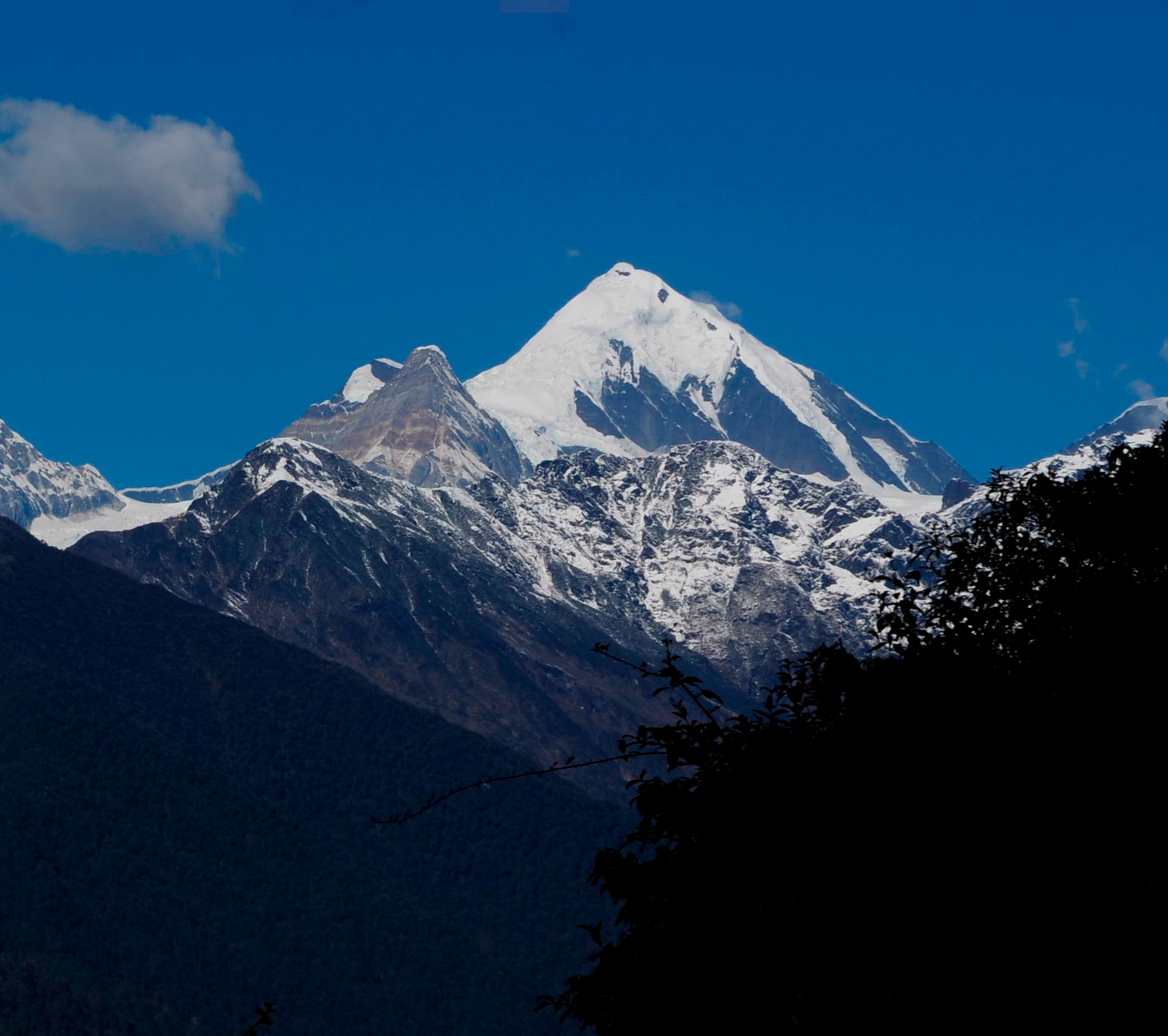
- View of the southern flanks of Khyarisatam / Kawang Gyang

Highest point
- Elevation: 6,890 m (22,600 ft)
- Prominence: 1,597 m (5,240 ft)
- Listing: Ultra
- Coordinates: 27°54′35″N 92°37′34″E

Naming
- Native name: Khyarisatam (Nyishi)

Geography
- Location within Arunachal Pradesh Location within India Location within Tibet Location within China
- Location: Arunachal Pradesh, India; Shannan Prefecture, Tibet
- Parent range: Eastern Himalayas

Chiumo (also known as Chumo or Chomo in Tibet; Nyishi: Khyarisatam; Puroik: Kawang Gyang) is a mountain peak located at 6,890 m (22,600 ft) above sea level on the McMahon Line, which runs between the state of Arunachal Pradesh, India and Tibetan Autonomous Region of China.

== Location ==
Kawang Gyang/Khyarisatam/Chiumo could be the highest in the Kangto Massif. The first one is Kangto, situated 6.6 mi (10.6 km) west-southwest, a part of Assam Himalaya. The other one is Katoie Gyang/Kra Daadi/Nyegi Kangsang shy of 7000 m. The prominence is 1,597 m (5,240 ft). The southern flank of the Chiumo is located in the Kameng River Basin, while the Subansiri River drains the northern flank. It is one of the three major peaks of the Kangto massif.

== Climbing history ==
There are no documented ascents of Chiumo. However three attempts have been made from the south in the last 5 years by Tapi Mra, Taro Hai, Tagit Sorang and Tame Bagang, who were part of the team including several tens of Puroik guides.

== See also ==
- List of ultras of the Himalayas
