= Kumar Waii =

Indian politician

Member of the Arunachal Pradesh Legislative Assembly
- Incumbent
- Assumed office 2024
- Preceded by: Goruk Pordung
- Constituency: Bameng
- In office 2004 – 2019
- Preceded by: Mekup Dolo
- Succeeded by: Goruk Pordung
- Constituency: Bameng

Personal details
- Born: April 10, 1971 (age 55) Arunachal Pradesh, India
- Party: Indian National Congress

Kumar Waii is an Indian politician from the state of Arunachal Pradesh. He is currently serving as member of Arunachal Pradesh Legislative Assembly representing Bameng.

Waii was elected from the Bameng seat in the 2014 Arunachal Pradesh Legislative Assembly election, standing as an Indian National Congress candidate. He served as the Minister of Home and Urban Development of Arunachal Pradesh in the previous government (2014–2019).

== Electoral performance ==
| Election | Constituency | Party | Result | Votes % | Opposition Candidate | Opposition Party | Opposition vote % | Ref |
|---|---|---|---|---|---|---|---|---|
| 2024 | Bameng | INC | Won | 52.36% | Doba Lamnio | BJP | 47.28% | |
| 2019 | Bameng | NPP | Lost | 47.58% | Goruk Pordung | BJP | 51.60% | |
| 2014 | Bameng | INC | Won | 60.12% | Vijay Sonam | BJP | 38.12% | |
| 2009 | Bameng | INC | Won | 71.21% | Tagung Neri | AITC | 28.79% | |
| 2004 | Bameng | INC | Won | 52.96% | Mekup Dolo | BJP | 47.04% | |

== See also ==
- Arunachal Pradesh Legislative Assembly
