= Bameng Assembly constituency =

Legislative Assembly constituency in Arunachal Pradesh State, India

Coordinates: 27.55°N 92.95°E

Bameng
- Constituency No. 8 for the Arunachal Pradesh Legislative Assembly

Constituency details
- Country: India
- Region: Northeast India
- State: Arunachal Pradesh
- District: East Kameng
- Lok Sabha constituency: Arunachal West
- Established: 1990
- Total electors: 13,960
- Reservation: ST

Member of Legislative Assembly
- 11th Arunachal Pradesh Legislative Assembly
- Incumbent Kumar Waii
- Party: Indian National Congress
- Elected year: 2024

Bameng is one of the 60 Legislative Assembly constituencies of Arunachal Pradesh state in India. It is part of East Kameng district and is reserved for candidates belonging to the Scheduled Tribes. As of 2024, it is represented by Kumar Waii of the Indian National Congress.

== Members of the Legislative Assembly ==
Election	Member	Party
1990	Dongle Sonam	Independent politician
1995	Medhi Dodum	Indian National Congress
1999	Mekup Dolo	Independent politician
2004	Kumar Waii	Indian National Congress
2009	Kumar Waii	Indian National Congress
2014	Kumar Waii	Indian National Congress
2019	Goruk Pordung	Bharatiya Janata Party
2024	Kumar Waii	Indian National Congress

== Election results ==
=== Assembly Election 2024 ===
2024 Arunachal Pradesh Legislative Assembly election: Bameng
Party	Candidate	Votes	%	±%
INC	Kumar Waii	6,554	52.36%	New
BJP	Doba Lamnio	5,919	47.28%	▼4.31
Margin of victory		635	5.07%	▲1.05
Turnout		12,518	89.67%	▲1.57
Registered electors		13,960		▲25.83
INC gain from BJP		Swing	▲0.76	

=== Assembly Election 2019 ===
2019 Arunachal Pradesh Legislative Assembly election: Bameng
Party	Candidate	Votes	%	±%
BJP	Goruk Pordung	5,043	51.60%	▲13.48
NPP	Kumar Waii	4,650	47.58%	New
NOTA	Nota	81	0.83%	New
Margin of victory		393	4.02%	▼17.98
Turnout		9,774	88.10%	▲3.74
Registered electors		11,094		▲10.76
BJP gain from INC		Swing	▼8.52	

=== Assembly Election 2014 ===
2014 Arunachal Pradesh Legislative Assembly election: Bameng
Party	Candidate	Votes	%	±%
INC	Kumar Waii	5,080	60.12%	▼11.09
BJP	Vijay Sonam	3,221	38.12%	New
Independent	Madang Sonam	81	0.96%	New
NOTA	None of the Above	68	0.80%	New
Margin of victory		1,859	22.00%	▼20.42
Turnout		8,450	84.37%	▼0.63
Registered electors		10,016		▲7.35
INC hold		Swing	▼11.09	

=== Assembly Election 2009 ===
2009 Arunachal Pradesh Legislative Assembly election: Bameng
Party	Candidate	Votes	%	±%
INC	Kumar Waii	5,647	71.21%	▲18.25
AITC	Tagung Neri	2,283	28.79%	New
Margin of victory		3,364	42.42%	▲36.49
Turnout		7,930	84.99%	▲19.80
Registered electors		9,330		▼16.54
INC hold		Swing		

=== Assembly Election 2004 ===
2004 Arunachal Pradesh Legislative Assembly election: Bameng
Party	Candidate	Votes	%	±%
INC	Kumar Waii	3,860	52.96%	▲22.40
BJP	Mekup Dolo	3,428	47.04%	New
Margin of victory		432	5.93%	▼7.37
Turnout		7,288	63.08%	▲3.75
Registered electors		11,179		▲3.33
INC gain from Independent		Swing		

=== Assembly Election 1999 ===
1999 Arunachal Pradesh Legislative Assembly election: Bameng
Party	Candidate	Votes	%	±%
Independent	Mekup Dolo	2,916	43.86%	New
INC	Medi Ram Dodum	2,032	30.57%	▼42.62
AC	Tage Lapung	1,700	25.57%	New
Margin of victory		884	13.30%	▼33.07
Turnout		6,648	64.89%	▼1.54
Registered electors		10,819		▲10.22
Independent gain from INC		Swing		

=== Assembly Election 1995 ===
1995 Arunachal Pradesh Legislative Assembly election: Bameng
Party	Candidate	Votes	%	±%
INC	Medhi Dodum	4,525	73.18%	▲37.34
JD	Donglo Sonam	1,658	26.82%	▲4.16
Margin of victory		2,867	46.37%	▲40.72
Turnout		6,183	64.29%	▼9.83
Registered electors		9,816		▲2.45
INC gain from Independent		Swing		

=== Assembly Election 1990 ===
1990 Arunachal Pradesh Legislative Assembly election: Bameng
Party	Candidate	Votes	%	±%
Independent	Dongle Sonam	2,895	41.49%	New
INC	Mai Sonam	2,501	35.85%	New
JD	Dokoi Jomo	1,581	22.66%	New
Margin of victory		394	5.65%	
Turnout		6,977	74.64%	
Registered electors		9,581		
Independent win (new seat)				

== See also ==
- List of constituencies of the Arunachal Pradesh Legislative Assembly
- East Kameng district
