= Kangto =

Mountain in Arunachal Pradesh India, on the border with China

- Kanggardo Rize
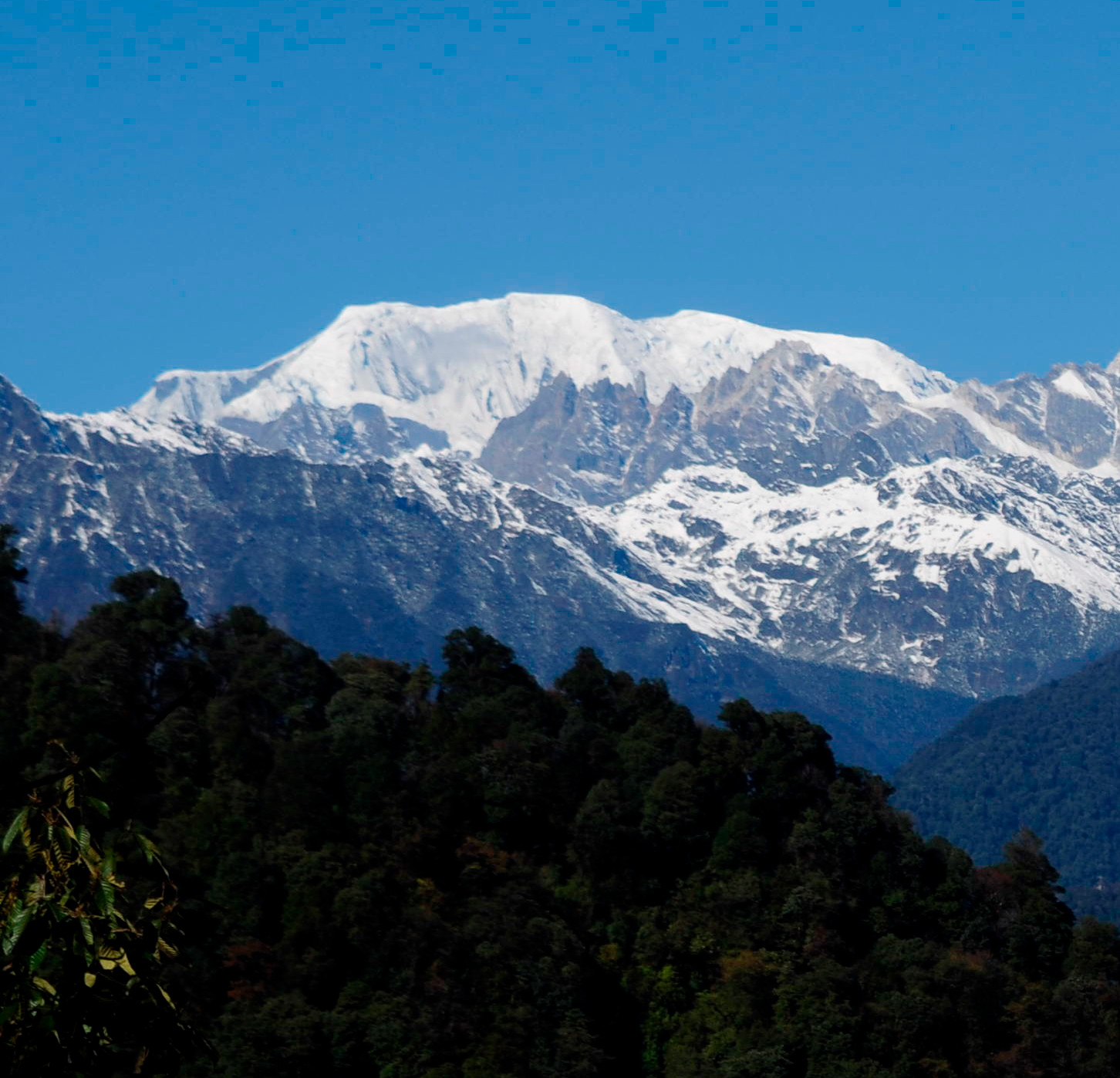
- Southeastern view of Kangto from Kameng/Katoie Kua Pi basin, East Kameng district, Arunachal Pradesh

Highest point
- Elevation: 7,090 m (23,260 ft)
- Prominence: 2,195 m (7,201 ft)
- Listing: Ultra; List of Indian states and union territories by highest point
- Coordinates: 27°51′54″N 92°31′57″E

Geography
- Location within Arunachal Pradesh Location within India Location within Tibet Location within China
- Location: Arunachal Pradesh, India; Shannan Prefecture, Tibet
- Parent range: Eastern Himalayas

Kangto (also known as Kanggardo Rize) at 7,090 metres (23,261 ft) is a mountain of the Eastern Himalayas located in the Indian state of Arunachal Pradesh and it shares its border with the Tibet Autonomous Region of China. It is the highest point in Arunachal Pradesh. The area in which Kangto is located lies in the Lada circle of Bichom district of the state. On the Chinese side, it lies in Cona County of Shannan Prefecture, Tibet.

Mount Kangto is the source of the Pachuk river, one of the main tributaries of the Kameng river in East Kameng district. It is one of the three major peaks of the Kangto massif.

A joint expedition team of ITBP and Indian Mountaineering Foundation had established a base camp at 9,920 feet on the banks of Pachuk river on October 21, 2017. All earlier attempts to reach the base of the peak were unsuccessful.

== See also ==
- List of ultras of the Himalayas
- Chiumo
