= Changla Himal =

Mountain in Nepal

- Chema Yungdung
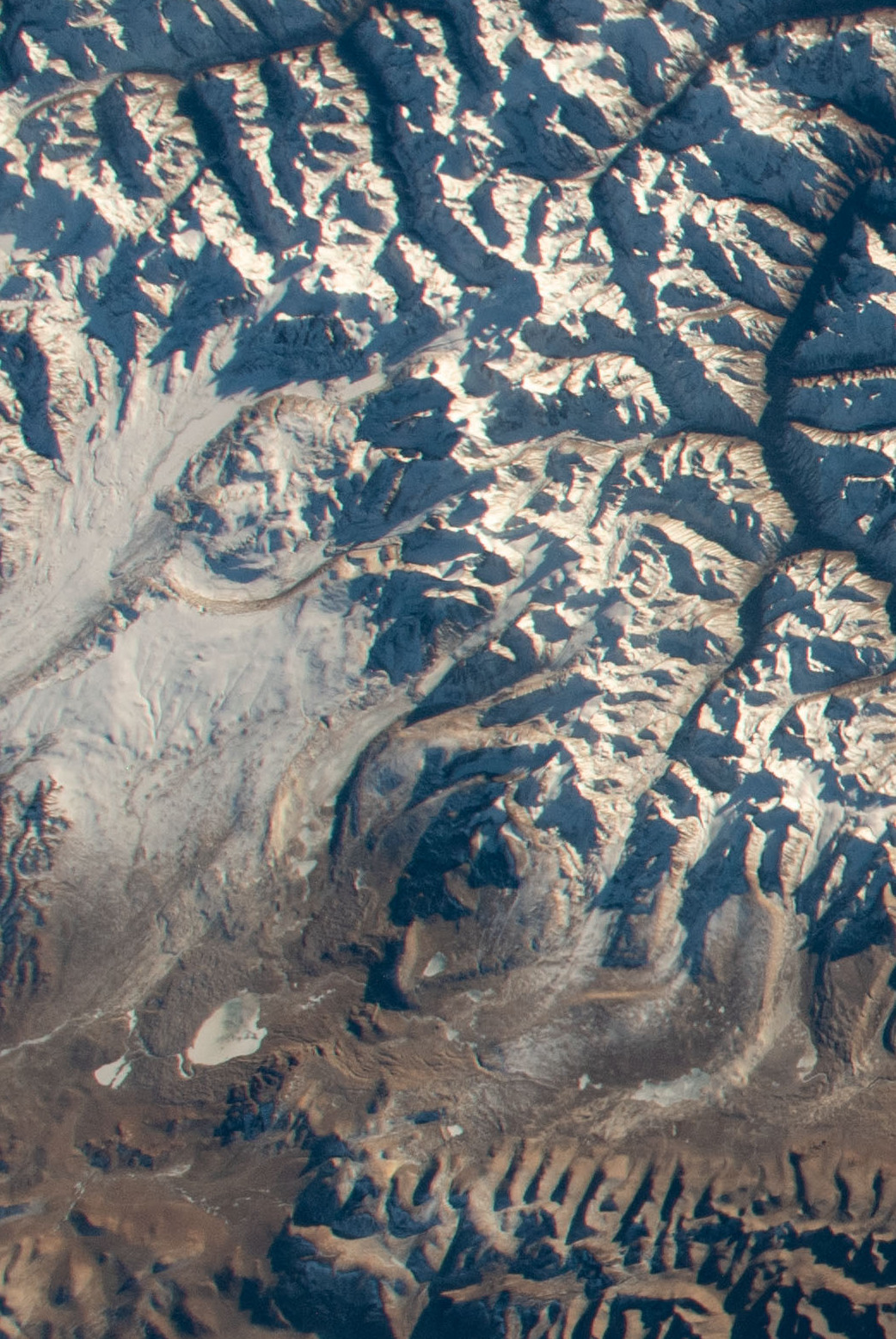
- Satellite image of the Changla Himal range

Highest point
- Elevation: 6,563 m (21,532 ft)
- Prominence: 883 m (2,897 ft)
- Listing: Ultra
- Coordinates: 30°18′10″N 82°07′43″E

Geography
- Location within Karnali Province Location within Nepal Location within China
- Location: China-Nepal border
- Parent range: Himalayas

Climbing
- First ascent: 2010

Changla Himal, also known as Chema Yungdung, or simply Changla, is a mountain in the Changla Himal range of the Himalayas. It has a summit elevation of 6,563 metres (21,532 ft) above sea level and is located on the China-Nepal border. It was first summited in September 2010 by a Japanese team led by Hirofumi Kabayashi.

== Naming ==
Changla Himal is also known as Chema Yungdung. Changla was the name given to another mountain in the same mountain group, which rises to 6,721 m (22,051 ft), and is located to the south of Changla Himal. Changes to the China-Nepal border in 1979 and subsequent revision to the maps issued by the Nepalese resulted in the historical name of Changla being applied to a different peak. Hence, the 6,721 m (22,051 ft) mountain, which was identified as Changla on the older maps, was subsequently applied to the 6,563 m (21,532 ft) peak in the Nepalese records.

== Geography ==
Changla Himal is a mountain on the Nepal–China border in the Changla Himal range of the Himalayas, in northwestern Nepal. It rises to an elevation of 6,563 m (21,532 ft), and has a topographic prominence of 883 m (2,897 ft). It is located in the headwater region of the Kubi Tsangpo river.

== Mountaineering ==
In 1983, a Japanese expedition team led by Kyoko Endo surveyed the Changla Himal and attempted the first ascent of Changla.

In September 1998, an expedition of the Osaka Alpine Club led by Sadao Yoshinaga came to the Changla Himal to explore the mountain ranges along the Nepal–Tibet border. The team attempted to climb the Changla Himal and established a base camp at 4,200 m (13,800 ft) near the Changla Pass. The team placed two higher camps at 5,023 m (16,480 ft) and 5,340 m (17,520 ft) and reached the summit of the Changla Southwest peak at 6,162 m (20,217 ft) on 31 October 1998 before turning back due to winter.

Later, a six member Japanese expedition led by Tomatsu Ohnishi made an attempt on the mountain in the autumn of 1998. They reached Changla's western summit through a route passing along the north and west ridges.

In September 2010, Changla Himal's main summit was climbed by a Japanese team led by Hirofumi Kabayashi. The team consisting of Kobayashi, Seiya Nakasukasa, Yuta Shibayama, and Naoki Yamaguchi took the route via Chula Khola along the north-northwest face of the mountain. They set up base camp at 4,700 m (15,400 ft), and later camp 1 at 5,500 m (18,000 ft). They made a push for the summit from camp 2 at 6,090 m (19,980 ft), along the northeast ridge. They reached the main summit at 11:40 on 27 September.

== See also ==
- List of mountains in Nepal
- List of ultras of the Himalayas
