= List of unclimbed mountains of Nepal =

This is the comprehensive list of all unclimbed mountains of Nepal.

S.N	Name	Height (metres)	Mountain	Region	Caravan route
1	Amphu Gyabien	5647	Mahalangur	Solu Khumbu	KtmLuklaNamcheTangbocheDingbocheBC
2	Amphu I	6840	Mahalangur	Solukhumbu	KtmLuklaNamcheTangbocheDingbocheBC
3	Anidesh chuli	6960	Kangchenjunga	Taplejung	KtmTaplejungGhunsaBC
4	Chabuk (Tsajirip)	6960	Kangchenjunga	Taplejung	KtmTaplejungDovanNilungSojangGhunsaBC
5	Chago	6893	Mahalangur	Solu Khumbu	KtmLuklaThangnaWest colSherpani Col
6	Chandi Himal	6096	Chandi Himal	Humla	KtmNepalgunjHumlaBC
7	Changla	6563	Changla	Karnali	KtmSimikotDharapaniKancheBhimthaukotiBC
8	Changwatnang	6125	Chandi Himal	Humla	KtmNepalgunjHumlaBC
9	Chaw Peak	6404	Kangchenjunga	Janak	KtmTaplejungPamtaYamjinBC
10	Chhochenphu Himal	6260	Kangchenjunga	Janak	KtmTaplejungSekhthungBC
11	Chhubohe Peak	5603	Annapurna	Manang	KtmBesisaharKotoBC
12	Chota Ri	6934	Khumbu Himal	Solukhumbu	KtmLuklaThang NaAmphu LaptseBC
13	Dazaney (Dzanaye Peak)	6710	Kangchenjunga	Taplejung	KtmTaplejungLonakLonak GlacierBC
14	Dhaulagiri	6632	Saipal	Bhajang	KtmNepalgunjBajhangBajuraBC
15	Dingiung Ri	6249	Gaurishankar	Dolakha	KtmCharikotSimi GaonBedingBC or Via Lama
16	Dogari Himal	6536	Dhaulagiri	Dhaulagiri	KtmBeniDarbanrMunaGurja GaonBC
17	Dragmorpa Ri (Panaya Tippa)	6185	Langtang	Bagmati	KtmDhunceLangtangKyanjingBC
18	Ek Rate Dada	6312	Makalu	Shankhuwasava	KtmLuklaMeralaThanangBC
19	Fimkof	6697	Saipal	Bajhang	KtmBajhangDuluBC
20	Gandharva	6248	Annapurna	Gandaki	KtmPokharaLandrukBagarBC
21	Ganesh VI	6480	Ganesh	Gorkha	KtmGorkhaArughatDovanBC
22	Ghustung North	6529	Dhaulagiri	Dhaulagiri	KtmBeniDarbangGurja GaonBC
23	Gorkha Himal	6092	Mahalangur	Solukhumbu	KtmLuklaMera laSherpani ColMakaluBC
24	Hongde	6556	Damodar	Mustang	KtmPokharaJomsomFrench Pass HongdeBC
25	Hongde	6556	Mukut	Mustang	KtmPokharaMarphaThapa PassBC
26	Hongu (Sura Peak)	6764	Mahalangur/makalu	Chamlang/Makalu	KtmLuklaMeralaHonguBC
27	Hunku	6119	Mahalangur	Solukhumbu	KtmTumlingtarNumsedewaBC
28	Jagdula Peak	5764	Jagdula	Karnali	KtmDunaiMuktinathBC
29	Jomsom Himal	6581	Damodar	Mustang	KtmPokharaJomsomLomangthangBC or Via Manang
30	Kalo Parbat	5419	Mukut Himal	Dhaulagiri	KtmPokharaJomsomMuktinathBC
31	Kambong Peak	6570	Dhaulagiri	Dhaulagiri	
32	Kande Hiunchuli	6627	Patrasi	Karnali	KtmJumlaTalpeChaubise KholaBC
33	Kang Nagchugo	6735	Gaurishankar	Dolakha	KtmCharikotSimi Gaon BedingBC or via Lama Bagar
34	Kanjerawa	6612	Kanjiroba	Karnali	KtmDunaiRingmo(Phoksundo)BC
35	Kanti Himal	6859	Kanti	Mugu	KtmNepalgunjMuguBC
36	Khangri West	6773	Mahalangur	Sagarmatha	KtmLuklaDin KharkhaBC
37	Khayan	6186	Mansiri	Gandaki	KtmBesisaharDharapaniDovan KholaBC
38	Khiurikala	5806	Saipal	Bajhang	KtmBajhangDuluBC
39	Khumjung	6699	Damodar	Mustang	KtmDa KharkhaJomsomLomangtang Bc
40	Kojichwa Chuli	6439	Kanti Himal	Karnali	
41	Kokthang	6148	Kanchenjunga	Singalila	KtmTaplejungYamphudinBC
42	Kumbatse	6639	Mahalangur	Solukhumbu	Ktm LuklaNamchePumori Bc
43	Kyungya Ri	6506	Langtang	Bagmati	KtmDhuncheKyanjingLangsisha KharkaBC
44	Kyungya Ri	6599	Langtang	Bagmati	KtmDhuncheKyanjingLangsisha KharkaBC
45	Lachama chuli	6721	Changla Himal	Karnali	
46	Lanpo Peak	6965	Kangchenjunga	Janak	KtmTaplejungGhunsaPemetembaBC
47	Lhayul Peak	6397	Api Himal	Humla	KtmNepalgunjHumlaBC
48	Linku Chuli1 (Pig	6719	Mahalangur	Rolwaling	KtmCharikotBedingBC
	Pherago Shar)				
49	Linku Chuli2 (Pig	6659	Mahalangur	Rolwaling	KtmCharikotBedingBC
	Pherago Nup)				
50	Lintren	6713	Mahalangur	Solukhumbu	KtmLuklaMera LaWest ColSherpani ColMakalu
51	Loshar I	6930	Kangchenjunga	Taplejung	KtmTaplejungGhunsaLonakTshima GlacierBC
52	Loshar II	6860	Kangchenjunga	Taplejung	KtmTaplejungGhunsaLonakTshima GlacierBC
53	Lumba Sumba	5670	Kangchenjunga	Taplejung	KtmTaplejungTshima GlacierBC
54	Lumba Sumba Peak	5672	Lumbasumba	Taplejung	KtmTaplejungTshima GlacierBC
55	Luza Peak	5726	Mahalangur	Taplejung	KtmLuklaNamcheDoleLuzaBC
56	Mariyang	6528	Kanjiroba	Karnali	
57	MDM Peak	6270	Kangchenjunga	Taplejung	KtmTaplejungGhunsaLonakTshima GlacierBC
58	Mojka Peak	6032	Kangchenjunga	Taplejung	KtmTaplejungGhunsaLonakTshima GlacierBC
59	Nagpai Gosum II	7296	Mahalangur	Solukhumbu	KtmLuklaNamcheThameLunakBC
60	Nagpai Gosum III	7110	Mahalangur	Solukhumbu	KtmLuklaNamcheThameBC
61	Nampa	6755	Gurans	Mahakali	KtmBaitadiChamelikhblaGhusaBC
62	Nampa II	6700	Gurans	Darchula/Bajhang	KtmNepalgunjBhajangDarchulaBC
63	Nampa III	6618	Gurans	Darchula/Bajhang	KtmNepalgunjBhajangDarchulaBC
64	Nampa, South	6580	ByasRikhi	Darchula/Bajhang	KtmNepalgunjBaitadiChameli KholaGhusaBC
65	Nangamari 1	6547	Kangchenjunga	Janak	KtmTaplejungGhunsaBC
66	Nangamari	6205	Kangchenjunga	Janak	KtmTaplejungGhunsaBC
67	Nar Phu	5748	Peri	Gorkha	KtmGorkhaArughatSama GaonBC
68	Panalotapa	6687	Mahalangur	Rolwaling	KtmCharikotSimi GaonBC
69	Panbuk Ri	6716	Mahalangur	Solukhumbu	KtmCharikotDolakhaBC
70	Pandra	6850	Kangchenjunga	Taplejung	KtmTaplejungGhunsaLunakTshima GlacierBC
71	Panpoche 1 (Pang Phunch)	6620	Mansiri	Gandaki	KtmArughatSama GaonBC
72	Panpoche 2 (Pang Phunch)	6504	Mansiri	Gandaki	KtmArughatSama GaonBC
73	Pashuwo	6177	Langtang	Gandaki	KtmSyabrubesiLangtang ValleyBC
74	Patrasi	6450	Patrasi	Karnali	KtmLuklaMeralaHunku GlacierBC
75	Peak 4	6736	Mahalangur/Makalu	Chamlang/Makalu	KtmLuklaThang NaAmphu LaptseBC
76	Peak 43	6779	Mahalangur	Solukhumbu	KtmLuklaThang NaAmphu LaptseBC
77	Phole	6645	Kangchenjunga	Taplejung	KtmTaplejungGhunsaPandra GlacierBC
78	Phu Kang	6694	Peri Himal	Manang	KtmBesisaharDhara PaniPhuBC
80	Pokharkan	6348	Damodar	Manang/Mustang	KtmBesisaharChameBC
81	Punchen Himal	6049	Mansiri	Gandaki	KtmBesisaharDharapaniDovan KholaBC
82	Punchen Himal	6049	Mansiri	Gandaki	KtmBesisaharDharapaniDovan KholaBC
83	Rokapi	5467	Saipal	Bhajang	KtmNepalgunjBhajangBajuraBC
84	Romaopen Peak	5407	Saipal	Bhajang	KtmNepalgunjBhajangBajuraBC
85	Rothong	6682	Kangchenjunga	Singalila	KtmTaplejungYamphudinRamcheBC
86	Saldim (Peak 5)	6374	Mahalangur/Makalu	Chamlang/Makalu	KtmLuklaMeralaWest ColBC
87	Sat Peak	6220	Kanchenjunga	Taplejung	KtmTaplejungGhunsaLonakTshima GlacierBC
88	Shantishikhar	7591	Mahalangur	Sagarmatha/Khumbu	KtmLuklaImja ValleyChhukungBC
89	Sharphu I	7070	Kangchenjunga	Taplejung	KtmTaplejungDovanNilungSojangGhunsaBC
90	Sharphu II	6154	Kangchenjunga	Taplejung	KtmTaplejungDovanNilungSojangGhunsaBC
91	Sharphu III	6885	Kangchenjunga	Taplejung	KtmTaplejungDovanNilungSojangGhunsaBC
92	Sharphu IV	6433	Kangchenjunga	Taplejung	KtmTaplejungDovanNilungSojangGhunsaBC
93	Sharphu V	6328	Kangchenjunga	Taplejung	KtmTaplejungDovanNilungSojangGhunsaBC
94	Sharphu VI	6076	Kangchenjunga	Taplejung	KtmTaplejungDovanNilungSojangGhunsaBC
95	Sherson (Peak 3)	6422	Mahalangur/ makalu	Chamlang/Makalu	KtmTumlingtarNumYangri KharkaBC
96	Sisne	5849	Sisne	Karnali	KtmJumlaLamriMahari GaonBC
97	Sobitongie	6670	Kangchenjunga	Taplejung	KtmTaplejungGhunsaPandra GlacierBC
98	SurmaSarovar, North	6523	Surma Saravar Lekh	Bajhang	KtmNepalgunjBajhangDuluBC
99	Suyaokang	5960	Kangchenjunga	Taplejung	KtmTaplejungDovanSekher ThumBC
100	Takargo	6771	Mahalangur	Rolwaling	KtmCharikotSimi GaonBedingBC
101	Takphu Himal	6395	Nalakankar	Karnali	KtmNepalgunjSimikotKerimiBC
102	Taple Sikhar (Cross Peak)	6341	Kangchenjunga	Taplejung	KtmTaplejungTapethokGhunsaKambachenBC
103	Thulagi Peak	7059	Mansiri	Gandaki	KtmBesisaharDhara PaniDovan KholaBC
104	Tilje	5697	Peri	Manang	KtmNumreKotoNarPhuBC
105	Tilkang	6369	Nalakankar	Karnali	KtmNepalgunjSimikotKerimiMuchuBC
106	Tobsar Peak	6100	Siringi Himal	Gorkha	KtmGorkhaArughatSama GaonBC
107	Tso Karop Kang	6556	Kanjibora	Humla	KtmNepalgunjHumlaBC
108	White Wave	5809	Kangchenjunga	Taplejung	KtmTaplejungYamphudinRamjeGhunsaBC
109	Yakawa Kang	6482	Damodar	Mustang	KtmPokharaJomsomMuktinathBC
110	Yanme Kang	6206	Kangchenjunga	Janak	KtmTaplejungGhunsaBC
111	Yokopahar (Nampa VIII)	6401	Gurans	Darchula/Bajhang	KtmNepalgunjBajhangBajuraBC
112	Yubra Himal	6035	Langtang Himal	Bagmati	KtmDhuncheLegbeniBC
