= Assam Himalaya =

Section of the Himalayas

Coordinates: 29°37′50″N 95°03′19″E

Assam Himalaya is a traditional designation for the portion of the Himalaya range between the eastern border of Bhutan, on the west, and the Great Bend of the Tsangpo River, on the east. The highest peak of this range is Namcha Barwa. Other high peaks include Gyala Peri, sister peak to Namcha Barwa; Kangto, and Nyegyi Kansang. The area is still poorly surveyed in general, and little visited by outsiders. It is located in the eastern side. The name "Assam Himalaya" is misleading, as some parts of this range are in southeastern Tibet, while other parts are in Bhutan and the Indian regions and states of northern Assam, Sikkim, and Arunachal Pradesh.

== Sources ==
- Neate, Jill (1989). High Asia: An Illustrated History of the 7000 Metre Peaks. Seattle: The Mountaineers. ISBN 0-89886-238-8.
