= Puroik =

Puroik may refer to:

- Puroik people or Sulung, of Arunachal Pradesh in northeastern India
- Puroik language, their Kho-Bwa (Sino-Tibetan) language
