= Dofana =

Mountain in Pakistan

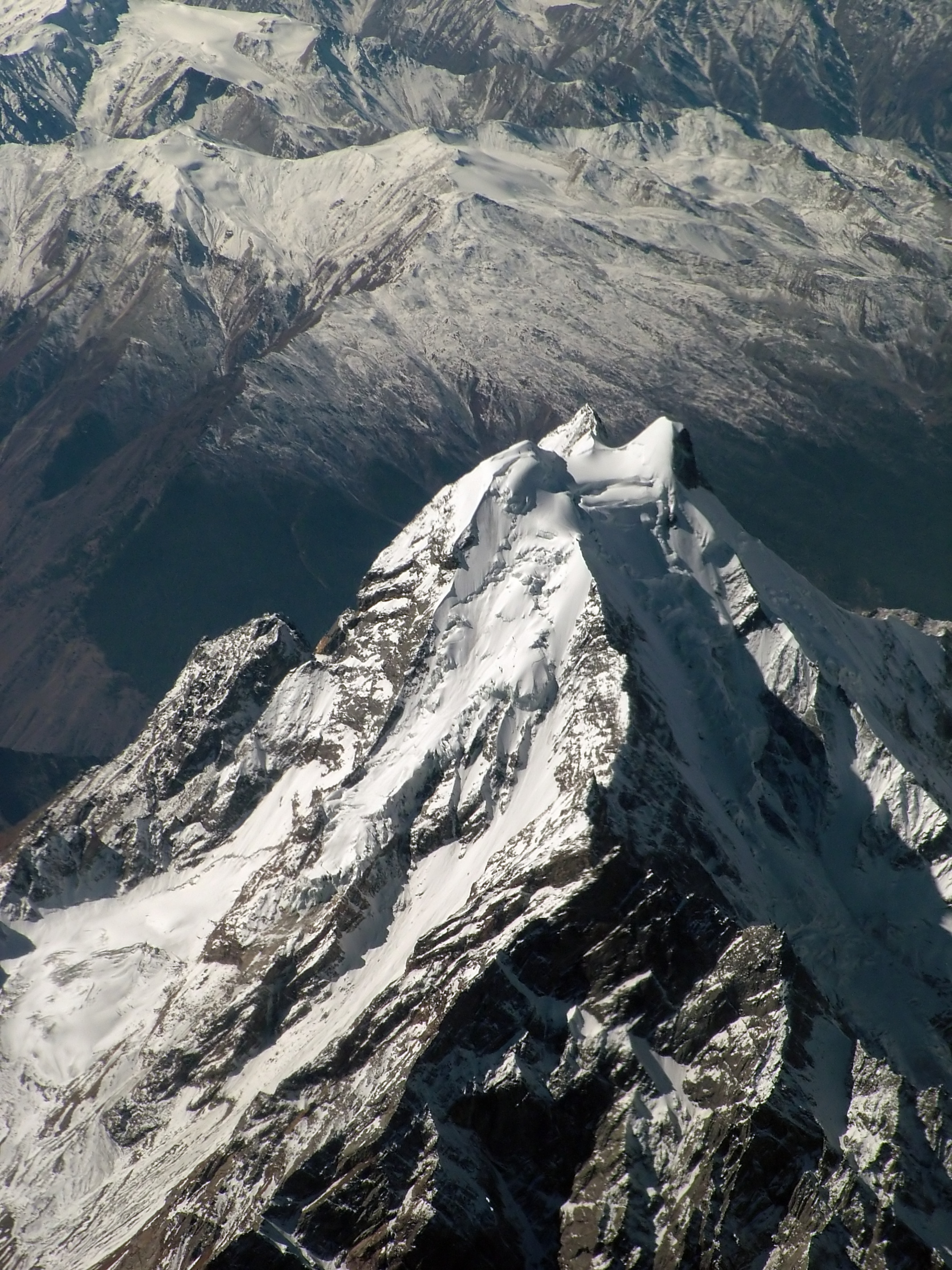

Highest point
- Elevation: 5,940 m (19,488 ft)
- Prominence: 1,875 m (6,152 ft)
- Isolation: 25.46 km (15.82 mi)
- Listing: Ultra
- Coordinates: 35°32′44″N 74°53′2″E

Geography
- Location within Pakistan
- Parent range: Punjab Himalaya

Dofana is a mountain in Gilgit-Baltistan, Pakistan. It is an ultra-prominent peak and is the 264th highest in Asia. It has an elevation of 5,940 m (19,488 ft).

== See also ==
- List of ultras of the Himalayas
