= Noijin Kangsang =

- Norin Kang
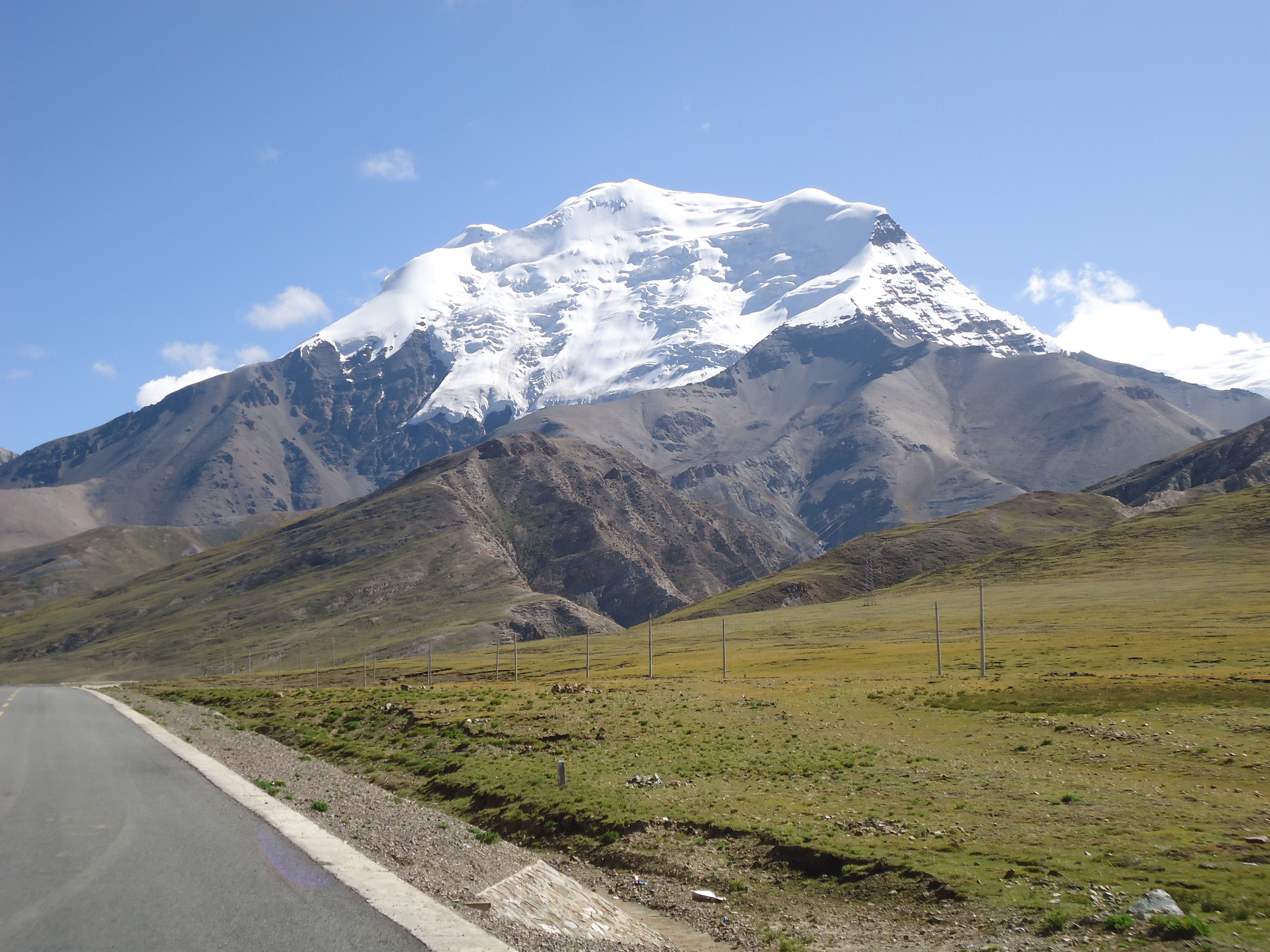
- Noijin Kangsang

Highest point
- Elevation: 7,206 m (23,642 ft); Ranked 104th
- Prominence: 2,145 m (7,037 ft)
- Listing: Ultra
- Coordinates: 28°56′54″N 90°10′42″E

Geography
- Location within Tibet
- Location: Tibet，China
- Parent range: Lhagoi Kangri

Climbing
- First ascent: 1986 by a Chinese expedition

Noijin Kangsang (Chinese: 宁金抗沙峰, also Norin Kang or Noijinkangsang) is the highest peak of Lhagoi Kangri mountain range in the Tibet Autonomous Region in China. It lies between the Yarlung Tsangpo River (to the north), Yamdrok Lake (to the east) and the Himalayas mountain range (to the south).

Noijin Kangsang was first climbed via the South Face and Southwest Ridge on 28 April 1986 by a Chinese expedition.

== See also ==
- List of ultras of the Himalayas
