= Pangpoche =

Mountain in Nepal

- Location within Nepal

Highest point
- Elevation: 6,620 m (21,720 ft)
- Prominence: 1,622 m (5,322 ft)
- Listing: Ultra
- Coordinates: 28°37′21″N 84°40′39″E

Geography
- Location: Nepal
- Parent range: Kutang Himal, Himalayas

Climbing
- First ascent: Archil Badriashvili, Giorgi Tepnadze, Bakar Gelashvili (Georgia) On October 4th, 2019.

Pangpoche, also known as Panpoche I, is a mountain in the Himalayas of Nepal. It has a summit elevation of 6,620 metres (21,720 ft) above sea level and is located approximately 15 kilometres (9.3 mi) northeast of the world's eighth-highest mountain, Manaslu (8,163 metres (26,781 ft)). On the ridge of Pangpoche to the South in 1.5 kilometers is located Pangpoche II 6,504 meters (21338 ft).

Both peaks were first ascended by three-men Georgian expedition in Autumn 2019, in alpine style.

== First Ascent ==
Until Autumn 2019 Pangpoche I has witnessed at least three unsuccessful attempts. The North-East ridge (First ascent line) by Japanese in 2009 and Norwegian team in 2012. The West-Northwest ridge by Italian-Swiss Expedition in 2019.

The first ascent of the peak was archived on 4th of October 2019 by Georgian team. Archil Badriashvili, Giorgi Tepnadze and Bakar Gelashvili climbed the North-East ridge over four days in alpine style.

The same trio has made first ascent of Pangpoche II earlier on September 22, climbing complex and dangerous South-West ridge and South-Southwest face in alpine style over three days.

Both ascents have been listed among most significant ascents of 2019, during Piolets d'Or (International Golden Ice Axe Award) 2020.

== See also ==
- List of mountains in Nepal
- List of ultras of the Himalayas

Media related to Kutang Himal at Wikimedia Commons
