= Shikar Beh =

- Location within Himachal Pradesh

Highest point
- Elevation: 6,200 m (20,300 ft)
- Prominence: 2,223 m (7,293 ft)
- Isolation: 31.35 km (19.48 mi)
- Listing: Ultra
- Coordinates: 32°25′N 77°4′E

Geography
- Country: India
- State: Himachal Pradesh
- Parent range: Punjab Himalayas

Shikar Beh is a mountain located in Himachal Pradesh, India. It is an ultra-prominent peak and is the 142nd highest in Asia. It has an elevation of 6,200 m (20,300 ft).

== History ==
In 1955, the Royal Air Force Mountaineering Association underwent an expedition to climb several unnamed peaks north of Manali in India. A documentary directed by Vic Bray called “Wings on the Himalayas” was created in the same year in collaboration with the Royal Air Force Mountaineering Association, which shows the team climbing three other mountains in the area. Taragiri, Tambu, and Ashagiri. They managed to reach the ‘Summit Cone’ of the Shikar Beh mountain.

In 1973, a Japanese team summited the mountain, but later expeditions found crevices making the summit almost impossible to reach.

On June 25, 2024, 9 mountaineers, including 6 sherpas and 2 base camp members, became the first people to summit Gupt Parvat. After summiting the mountain, the decided to try and summit Shikar Beh, but at around 200 meters from the summit, they encountered a lot of crevices, making it almost impossible to reach the summit.

Several other expeditions from Japan, Italy, and India also took place.

== See also ==
- List of ultras of the Himalayas
