= Mulkila =

Mountain in India

- Silver God
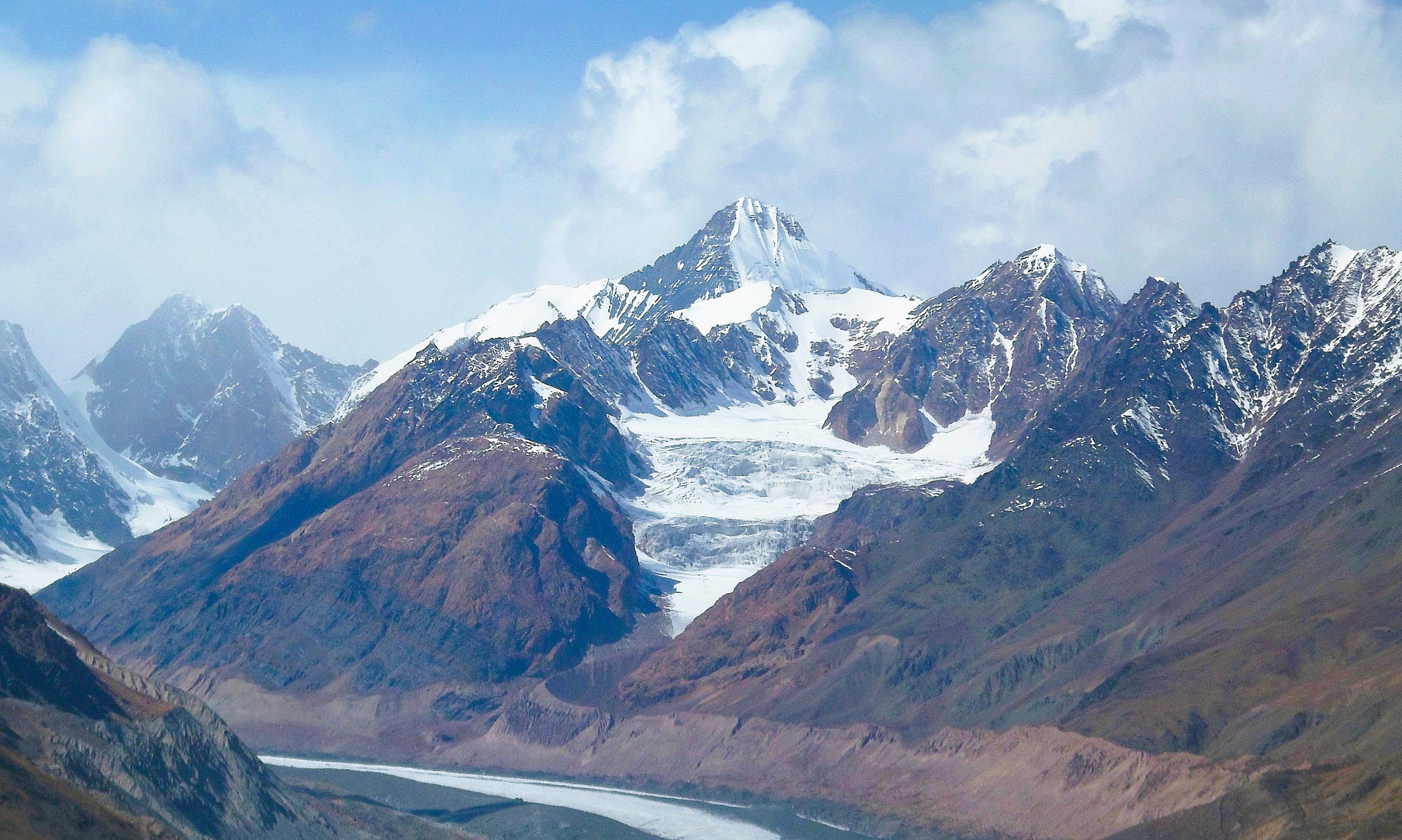
- East aspect, summit centered in back

Highest point
- Elevation: 6,517 m (21,381 ft)
- Prominence: 1,586 m (5,203 ft)
- Isolation: 54.51 km (33.87 mi)
- Listing: Ultras of the Himalayas
- Coordinates: 32°32′43″N 77°24′42″E

Geography
- Location within India
- Interactive map of Mulkila
- Country: India
- State: Himachal Pradesh
- District: Lahaul and Spiti
- Parent range: Himalayas

Climbing
- First ascent: 1939

Mulkila is a mountain in India.

== Description ==
Mulkila is a 6,517-metre (21,381-foot) summit in the Himalayas. The glaciated mountain is situated in the state of Himachal Pradesh, 155 kilometres (96 mi) north of the capital city of Shimla. Precipitation runoff from this mountain's slopes drains east to the Chandra River and west to the Bhaga River, and these two rivers ultimately converge to form the Chenab River. Topographic relief is significant as the south face rises 1,117 metres (3,665 ft) in one kilometre (0.62 mi). The first ascent of the summit was accomplished on September 7, 1939, by Ludwig Krenek, Robey Johnson, and Dr. Fritz Kolb. The first ascent by Indians was made on August 22, 1989, by Goutam Dutta and R.S. Negi. The mountain's toponym, Mulkila, translates as "Silver God," and the mountain is also known as Mulkila IV, or M4.

== Climate ==
Based on the Köppen climate classification, Mulkila is located in a tundra climate zone with cold, snowy winters, and cool summers. Weather systems are forced upwards by the Himalaya mountains (orographic lift), causing heavy precipitation in the form of rainfall and snowfall. July through September is the monsoon season. The months of April, May and June offer the most favorable weather for viewing or climbing this mountain.

== See also ==
- Geology of the Himalayas
- List of ultras of the Himalayas
