= List of ultras of the Himalayas =

This is a list of all the ultra-prominent peaks (with topographic prominence greater than 1,500 metres) in the Himalayas. Listed separately, to the west and north-west are the Karakoram and Hindu Kush Ultras, and while to the north-east and east are the ultras of Tibet. 9 of the 10 Himalayan 8,000m peaks are ultras (the exception is Lhotse), and there are a further 28 peaks over 7000m.

== Kashmir/Himachal Pradesh - Between Indus and Sutlej Rivers ==
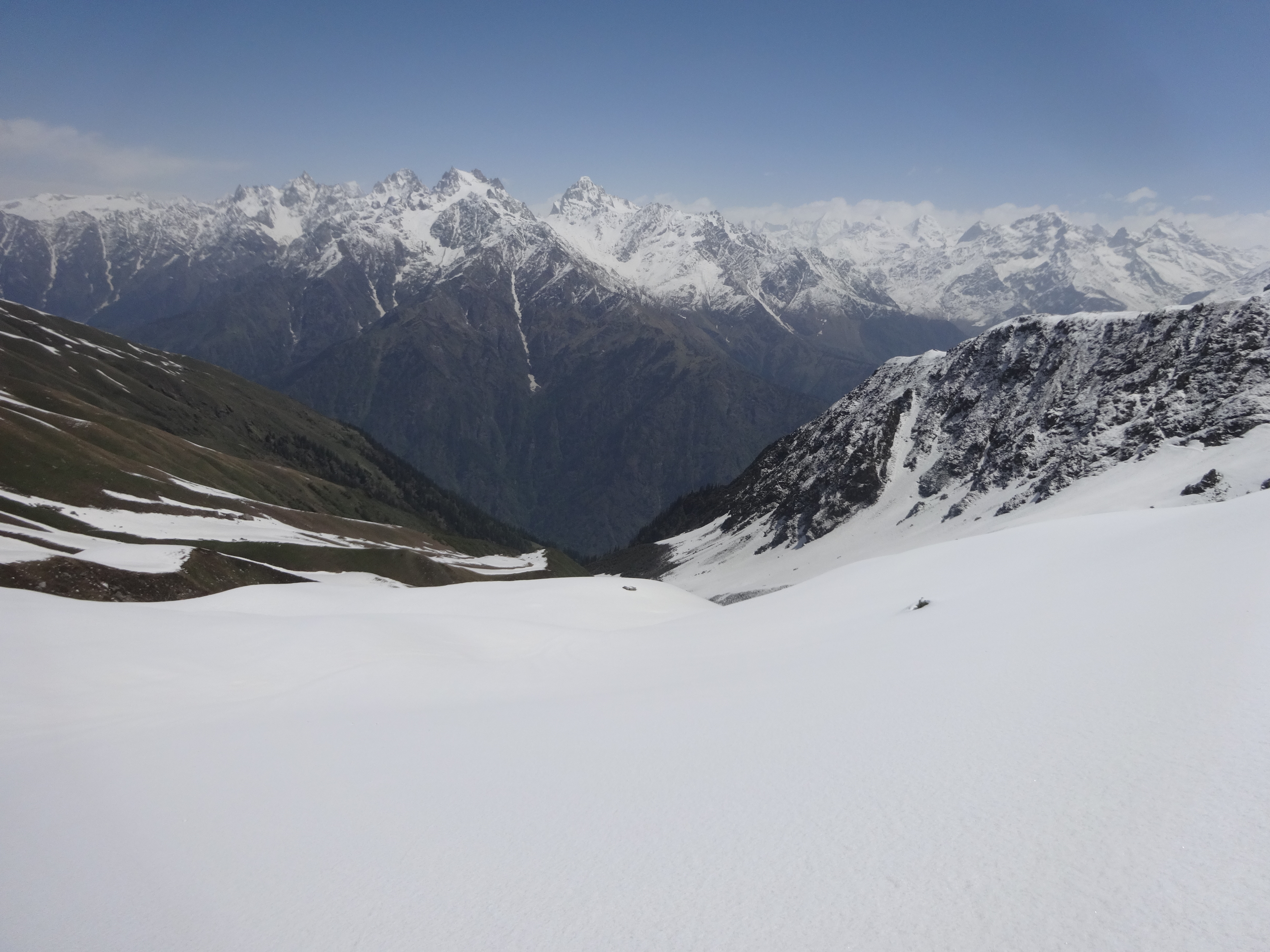
Parbati Parbat, Himachal Pradesh, India

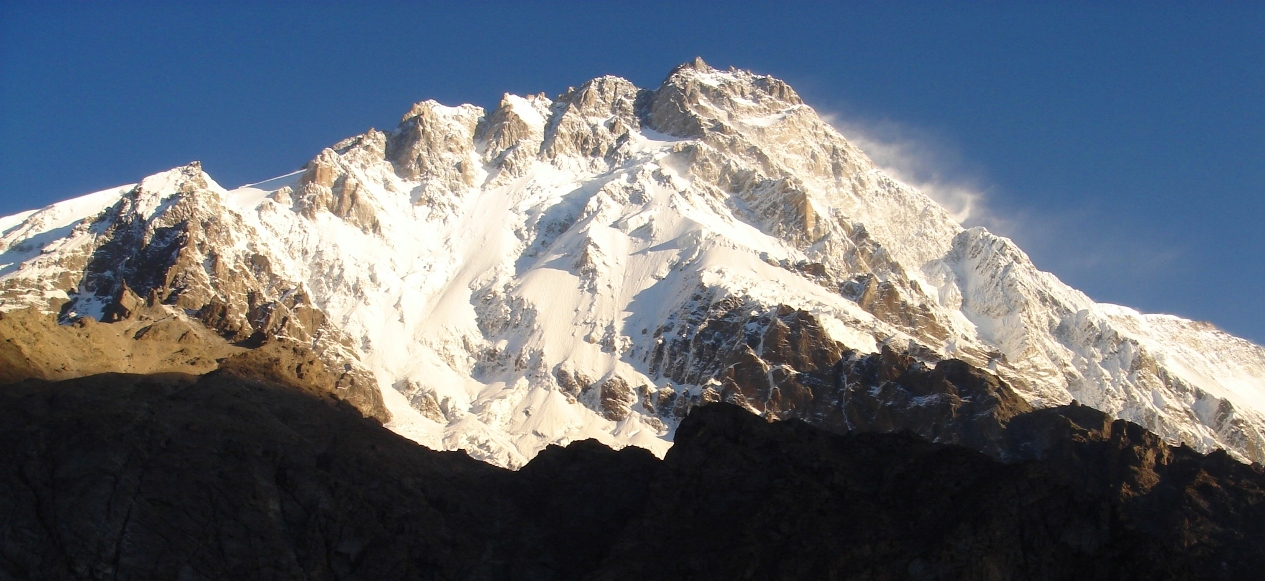
Nanga Parbat, Pakistan

No	Peak	Country	Elevation (m)	Prominence (m)	Col (m)
1	Nanga Parbat	Pakistan	8,125	4,608	3517
2	Nun	India	7,135	2,404	4731
3	Shikar Beh	India	6,200	2,223	3977
4	Parbati Parbat	India	6,633	2,093	4540
5	Reo Purgyil	India / China	6,816	1,978	4838
6	Sunset Peak	India	4,745	1,942	2803
7	Miranjani	Pakistan	2,981	1,911	1070
8	Gya	India / China	6,794	1,910	4884
9	Dofana	Pakistan	5,940	1,875	4065
10	Point 5608	Pakistan / India	5,608	1,850	3758
11	Manirang	India	6,593	1,727	4866
12	Point 5800	Pakistan	5,800	1,682	4118
13	Point 6086	India	6,086	1,618	4468
14	Bharanzar	India	6,574	1,606	4968
15	Mulkila	India	6,517	1,586	4931
16	Kolahoi	India	5,425	1,585	3840
17	Point 5971	India	5,971	1,566	4405
18	Junkor	Pakistan / India	5,373	1,563	3810
19	Doda	India	6,573	1,504	5069

== Garhwal/Kumaon- Sutlej to Kali Rivers ==
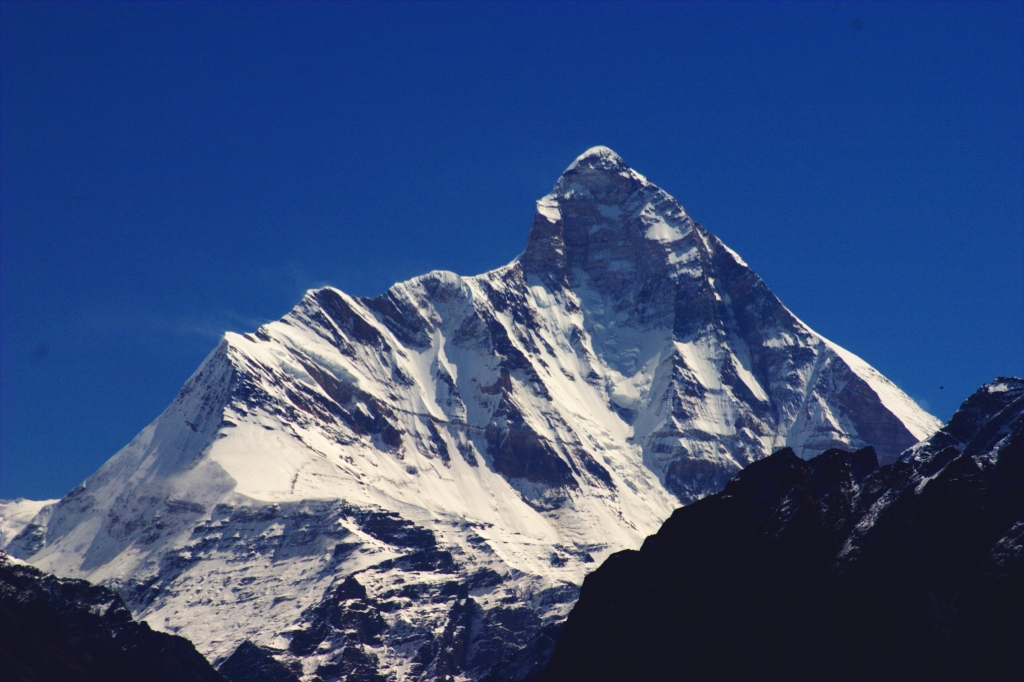
Nanda Devi, India

No	Peak	Country	Elevation (m)	Prominence (m)	Col (m)
1	Nanda Devi	India	7,816	3,139	4677
2	Kamet	India	7,756	2,825	4931
3	Rangrik Rang	India	6,684	1,674	5010
4	Hathi Parbat	India	6,727	1,673	5054
5	Trisul	India	7,120	1,616	5504
6	Panchchuli	India	6,904	1,614	5290
7	Chaukhamba	India	7,138	1,594	5544
8	Nanda Kot	India	6,861	1,592	5269

== Western Nepal/Tibet: Sharda River to Kali Gandaki River ==
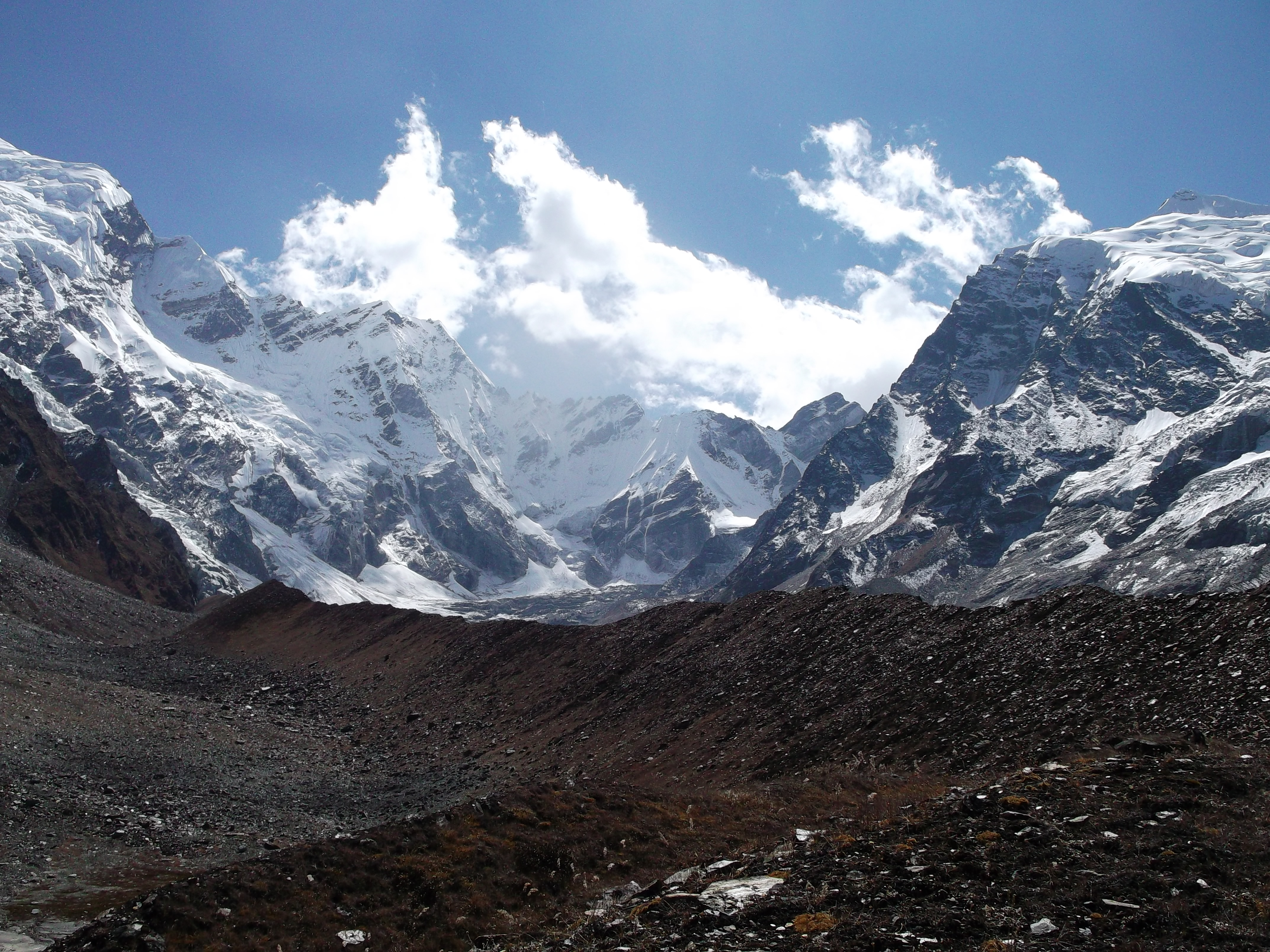
Api, Nepal

No	Peak	Country	Elevation (m)	Prominence (m)	Col (m)
1	Dhaulagiri	Nepal	8,167	3,357	4810
2	Gurla Mandhata	China	7,694	2,788	4906
3	Dhaulagiri II	Nepal	7,752	2,397	5355
4	Api	Nepal	7,132	2,040	5092
5	Kanjiroba	Nepal	6,883	1,870	5013
6	Saipal	Nepal	7,031	1,824	5207
7	Kubi Gangri	Nepal / China	6,859	1,699	5160
8	Badi malika	Nepal	4,390	1,678	2712
9	Changla	Nepal / China	6,721	1,657	5064
10	Bhalu Lek	Nepal	5,425	1,643	3782
11	Jethi Bahurani	Nepal	6,850	1,558	5292

The Kali Gandaki River is normally considered to mark the divide between the Western and Eastern Himalayas.

== Central Nepal/Tibet: Kali Gandaki River to Arun River ==
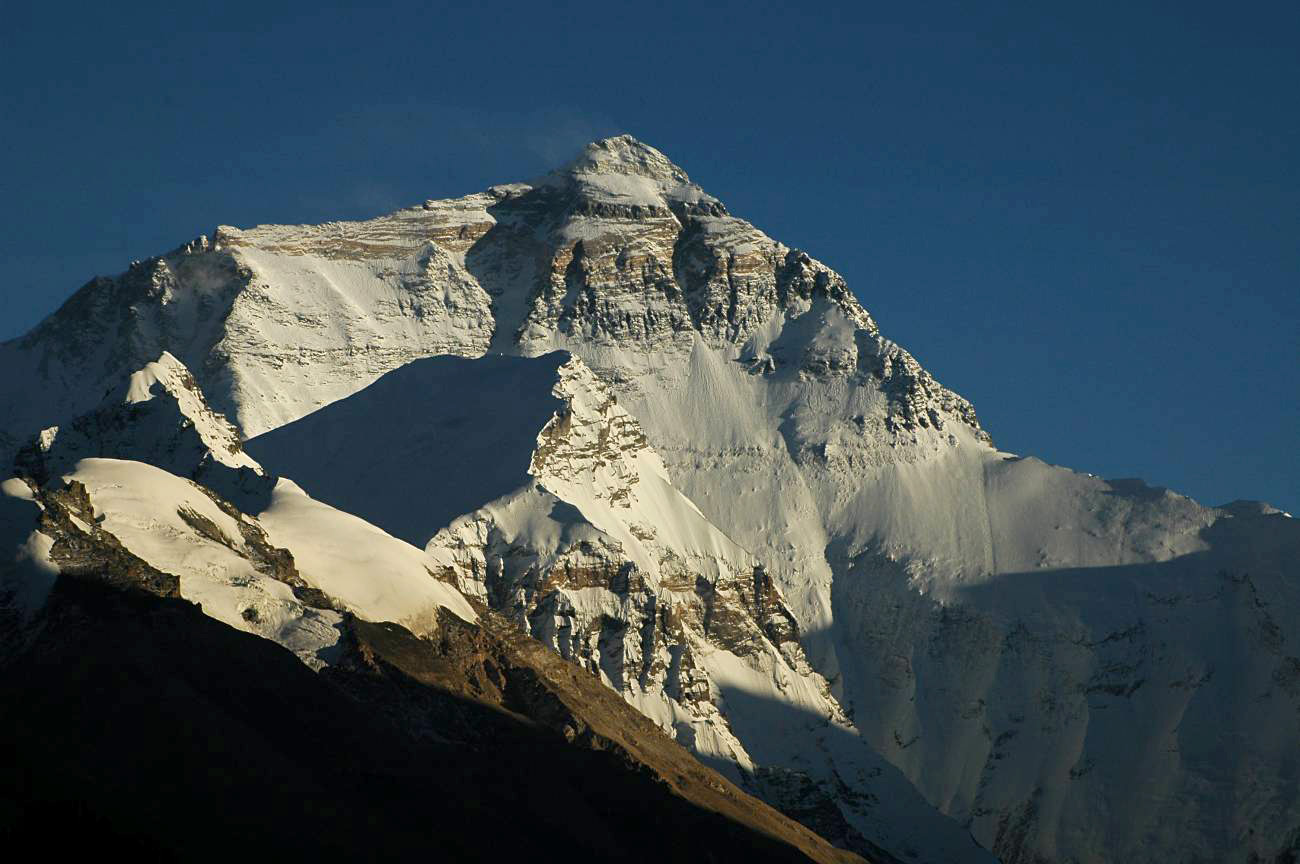
Mount Everest, Nepal

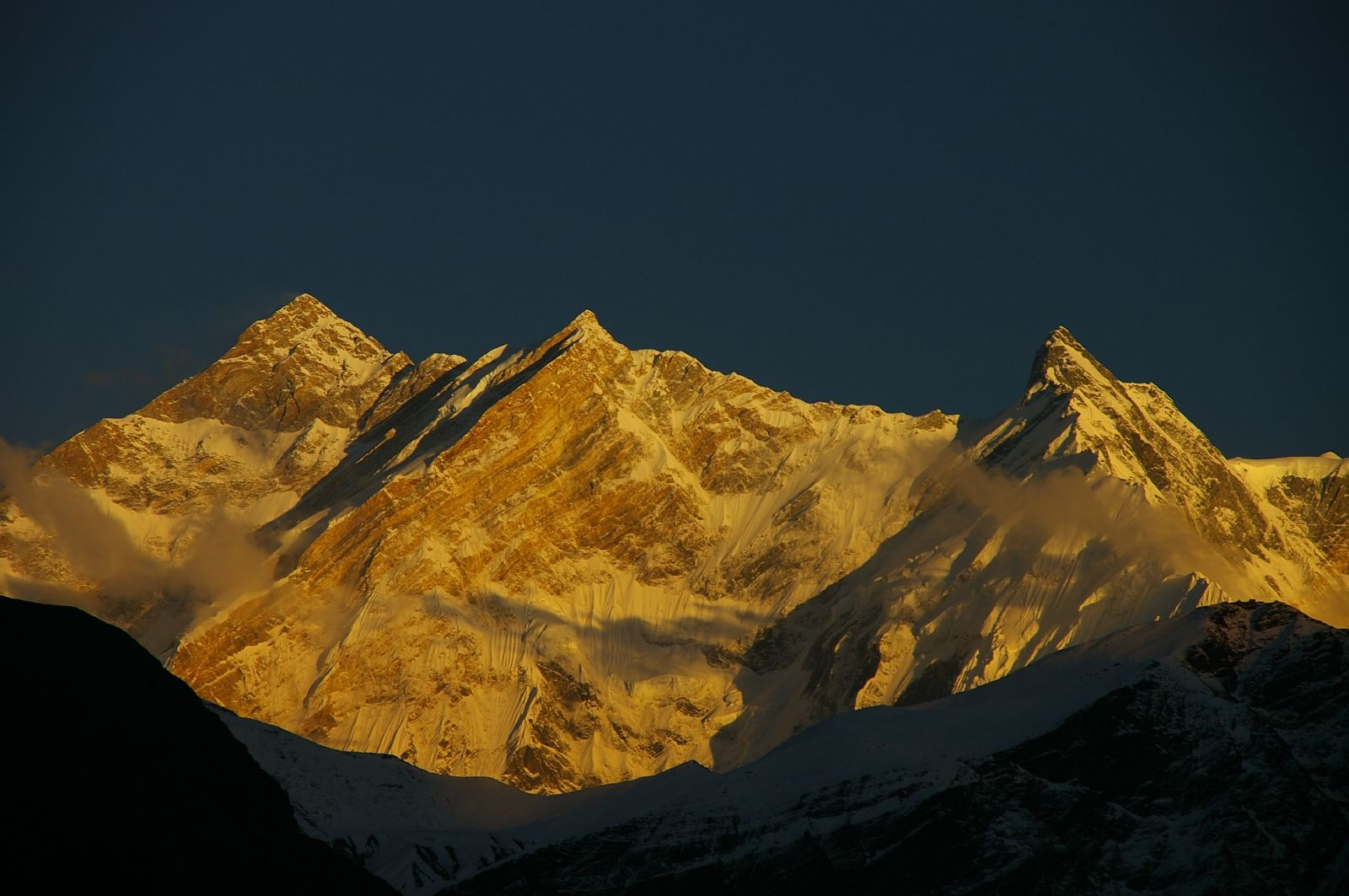
Annapurna, Nepal

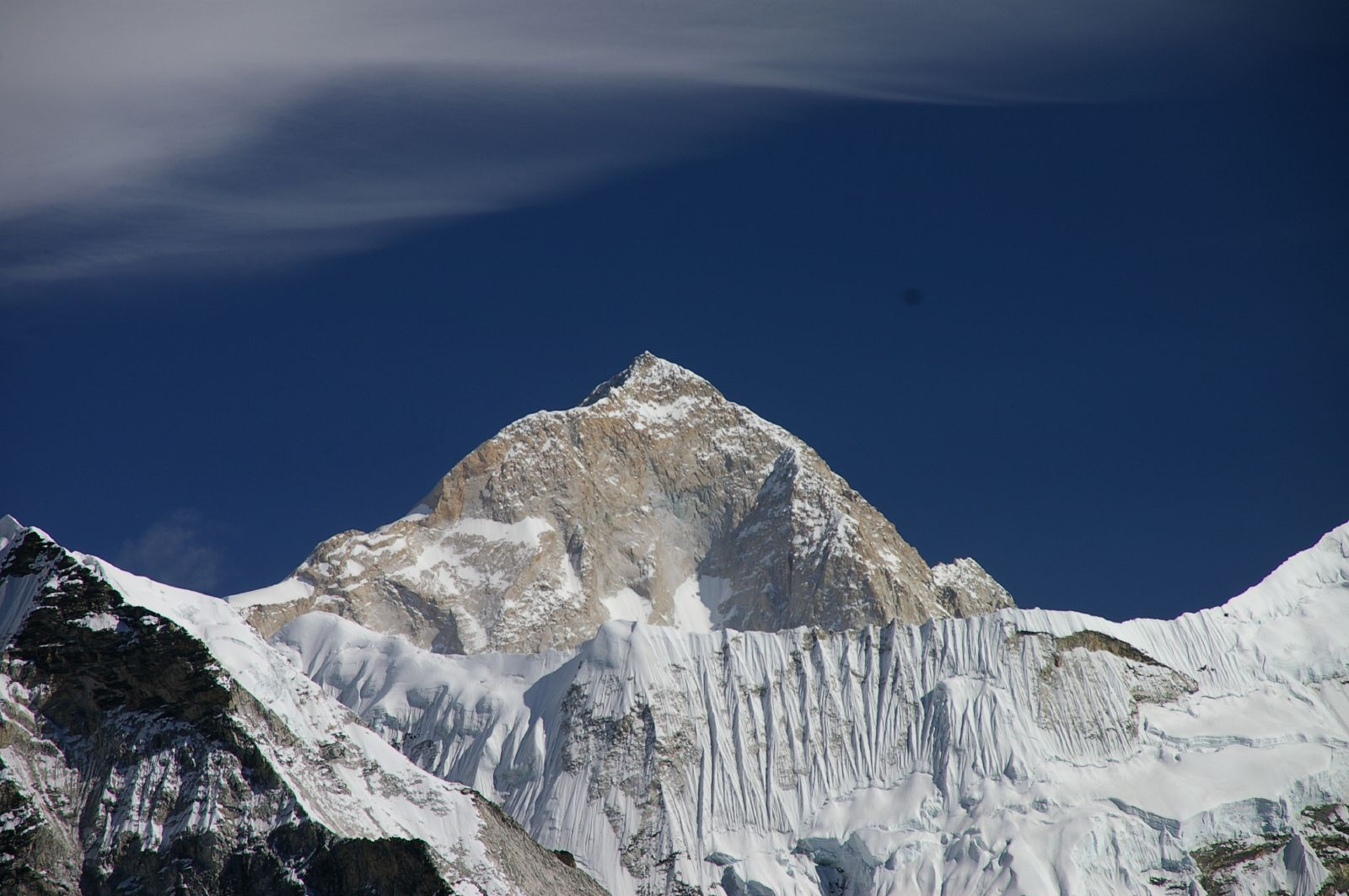
Makalu, Nepal

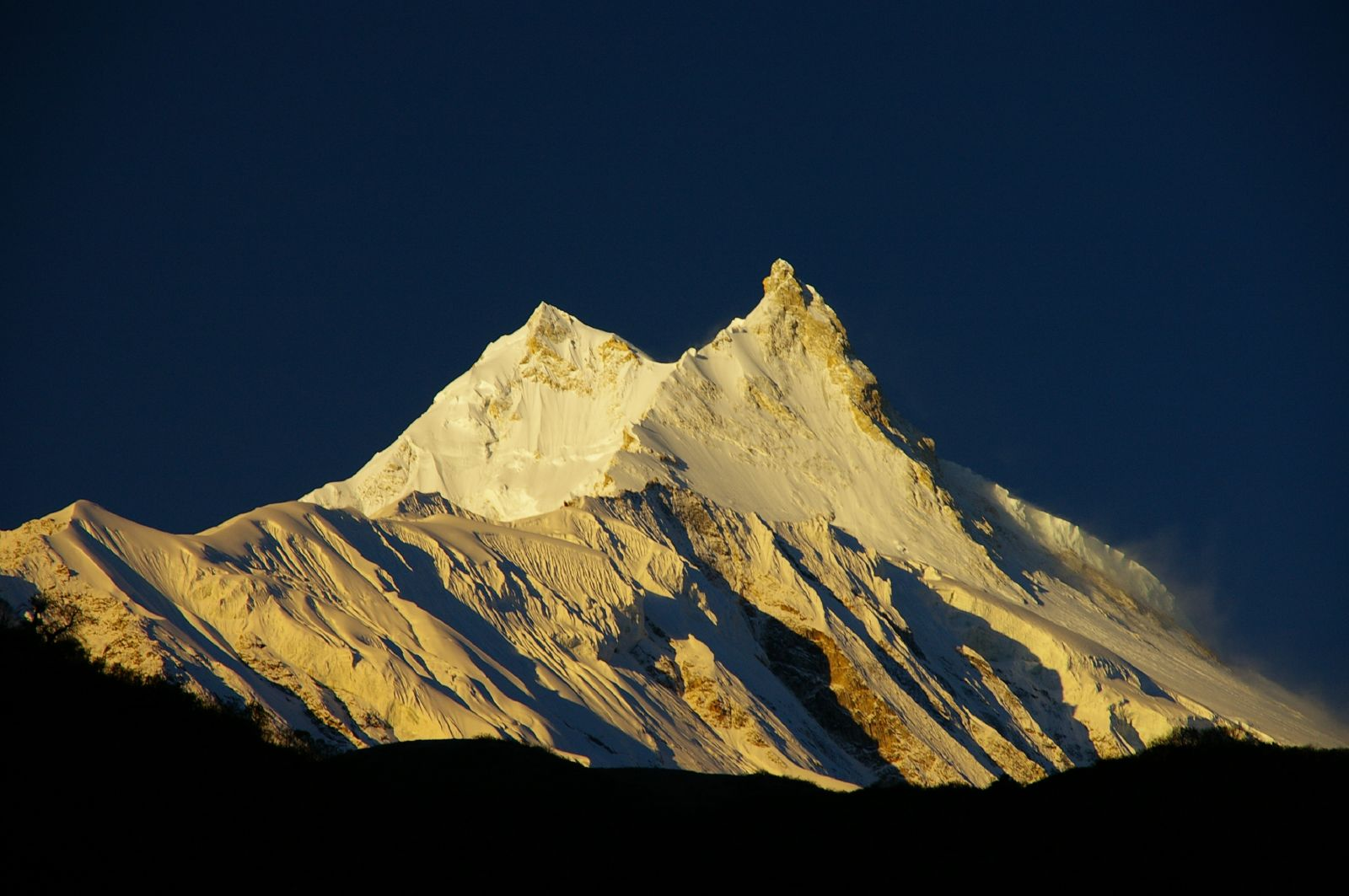
Manaslu, Nepal

No	Peak	Country	Elevation (m)	Prominence (m)	Col (m)
1	Mount Everest	China / Nepal	8,848	8,848	0
2	Manaslu	Nepal	8,163	3,092	5071
3	Annapurna I	Nepal	8,091	2,984	5107
4	Shishapangma	China	8,027	2,897	5130
5	Annapurna II	Nepal	7,937	2,437	5500
6	Makalu	China / Nepal	8,485	2,378	6107
7	Yangra	Nepal	7,422	2,352	5070
8	Cho Oyu	China / Nepal	8,188	2,340	5848
9	Chamar	Nepal	7,165	2,061	5104
10	Labuche Kang	China	7,367	1,957	5410
11	Nemjung	Nepal	7,140	1,920	5220
12	Tsanglha Ri (Zang La)	China	6,495	1,712	4783
13	Himalchuli	Nepal	7,893	1,633	6260
14	Pangpoche	Nepal	6,620	1,622	4998
15	Gauri Sankar	Nepal	7,146	1,600	5546
16	Melungtse	China	7,181	1,551	5630
17	Langtang Lirung	Nepal	7,234	1,534	5700

== Arun River to Bhutan border ==
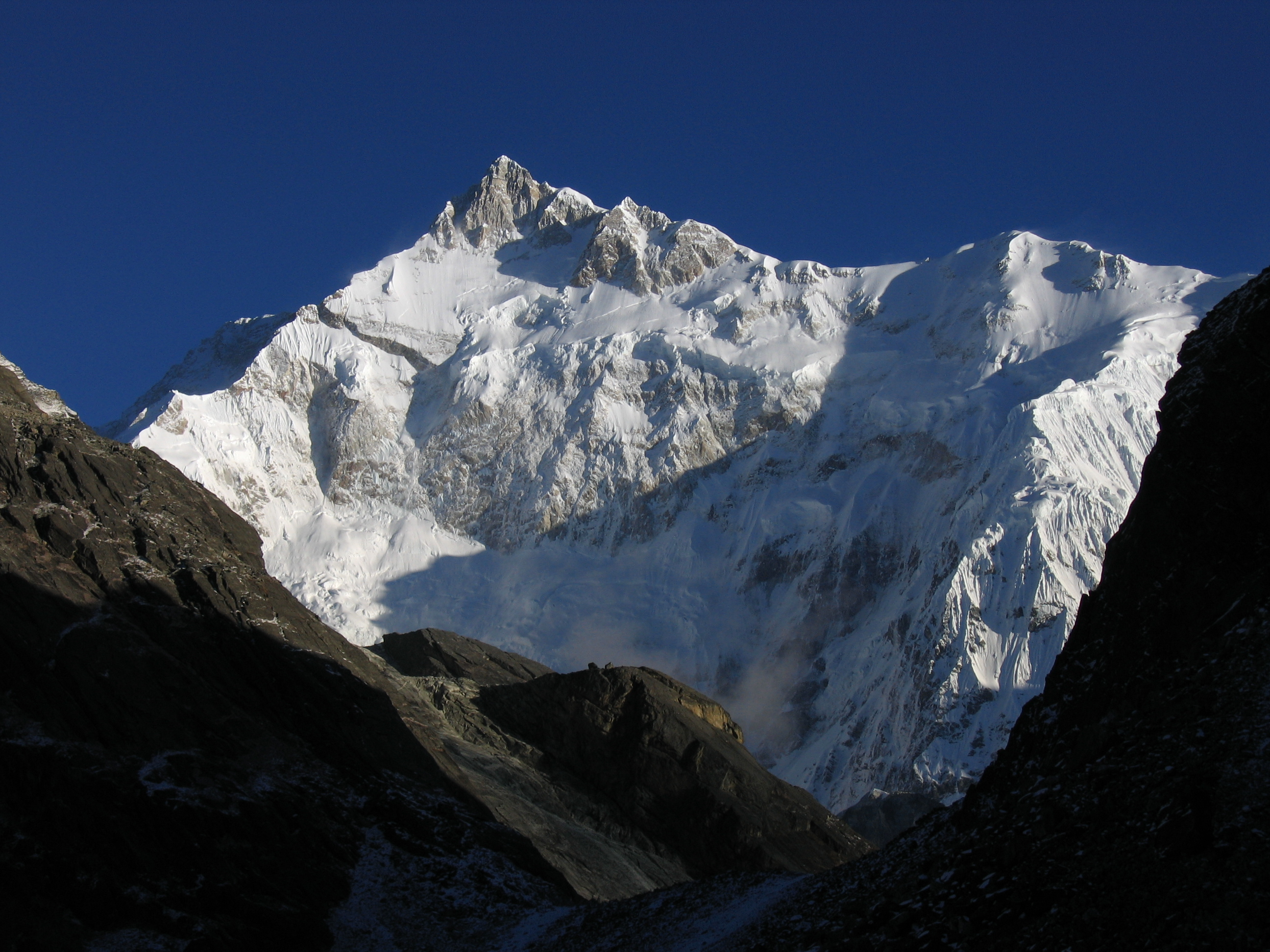
Kangchenjunga, Nepal

No	Peak	Country	Elevation (m)	Prominence (m)	Col (m)
1	Kangchenjunga	India / Nepal	8,586	3,922	4664
2	Pauhunri	India / China	7,128	2,035	5093
3	Nyonno Ri	China	6,724	1,805	4919
4	Pandim	India	6,691	1,762	4929
5	Chomo Yummo	China / India	6,829	1,559	5270

== Bhutan to the Brahmaputra (Assam Himalaya) ==
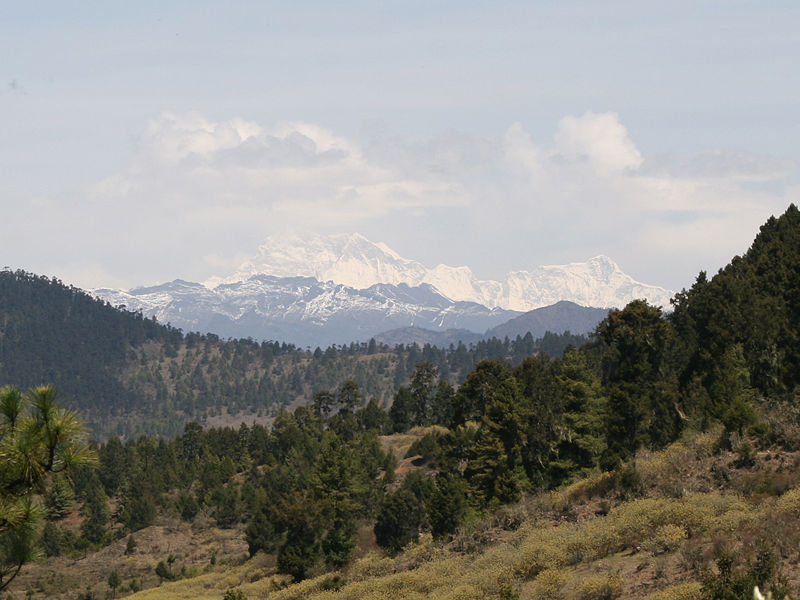
Gangkhar Puensum, Bhutan/China

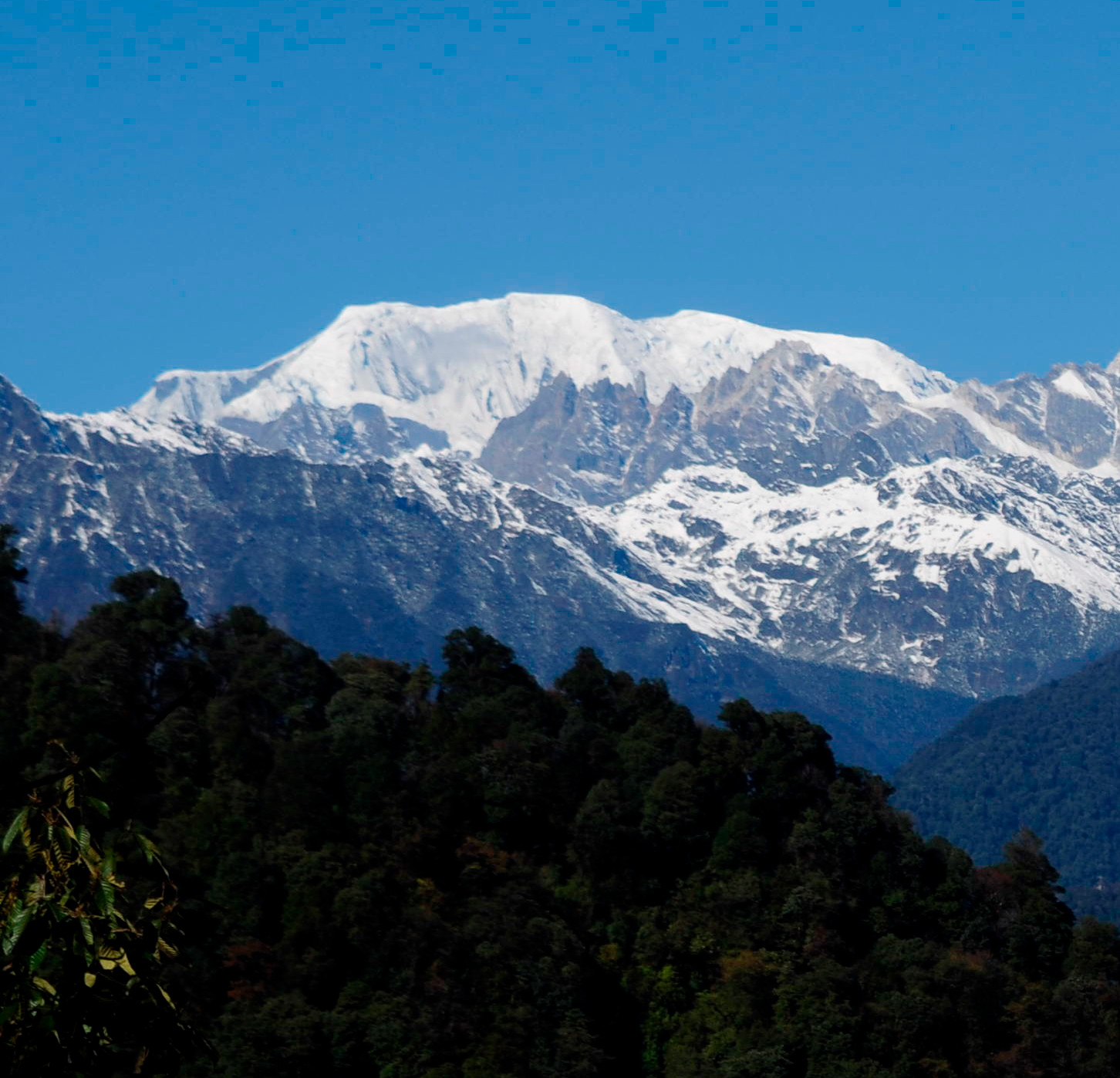
Kangto East Kameng district, Arunachal Pradesh, India

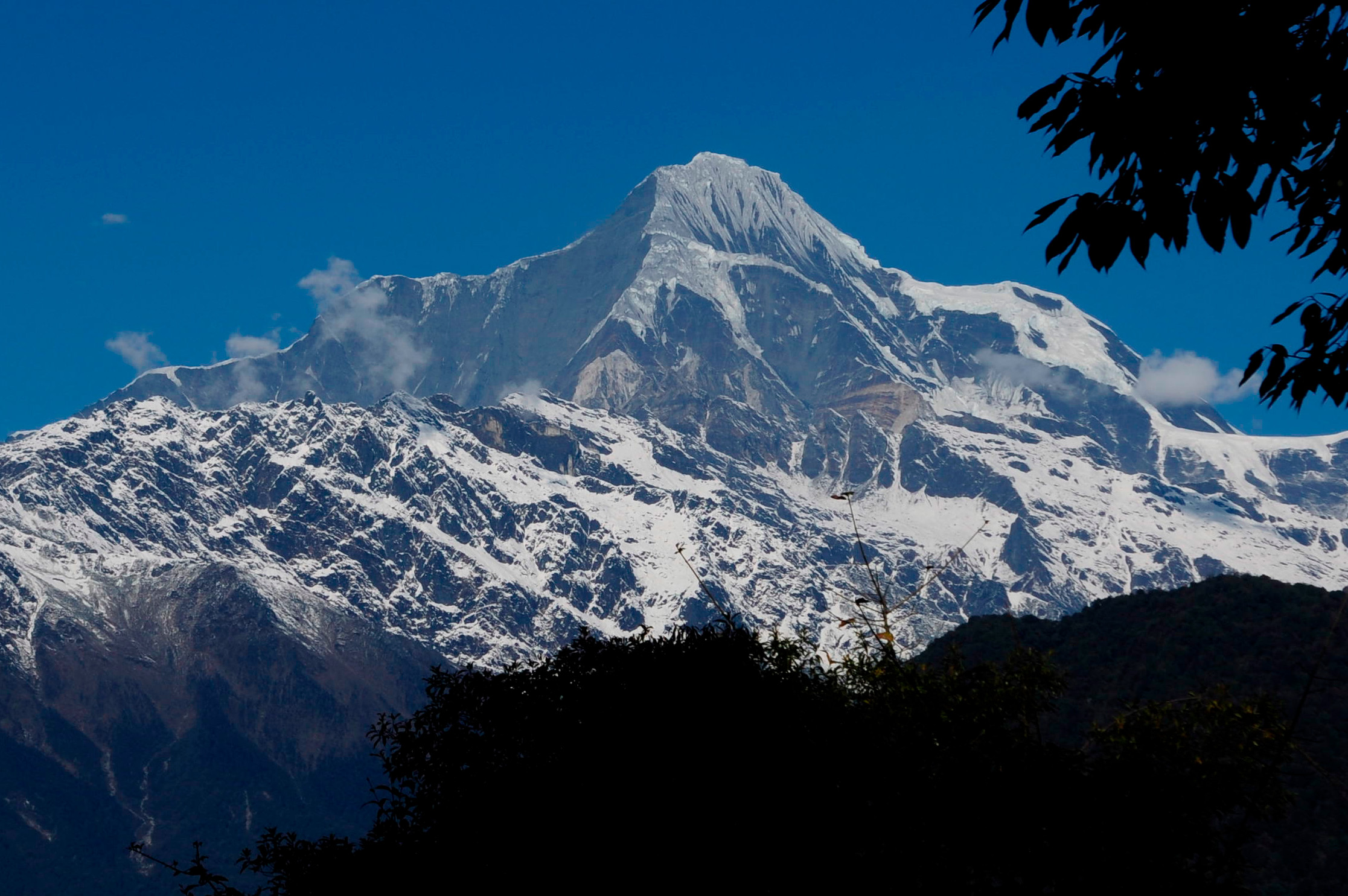
Katoie Gyang/Kra Daadi East Kameng district, Arunachal Pradesh, India

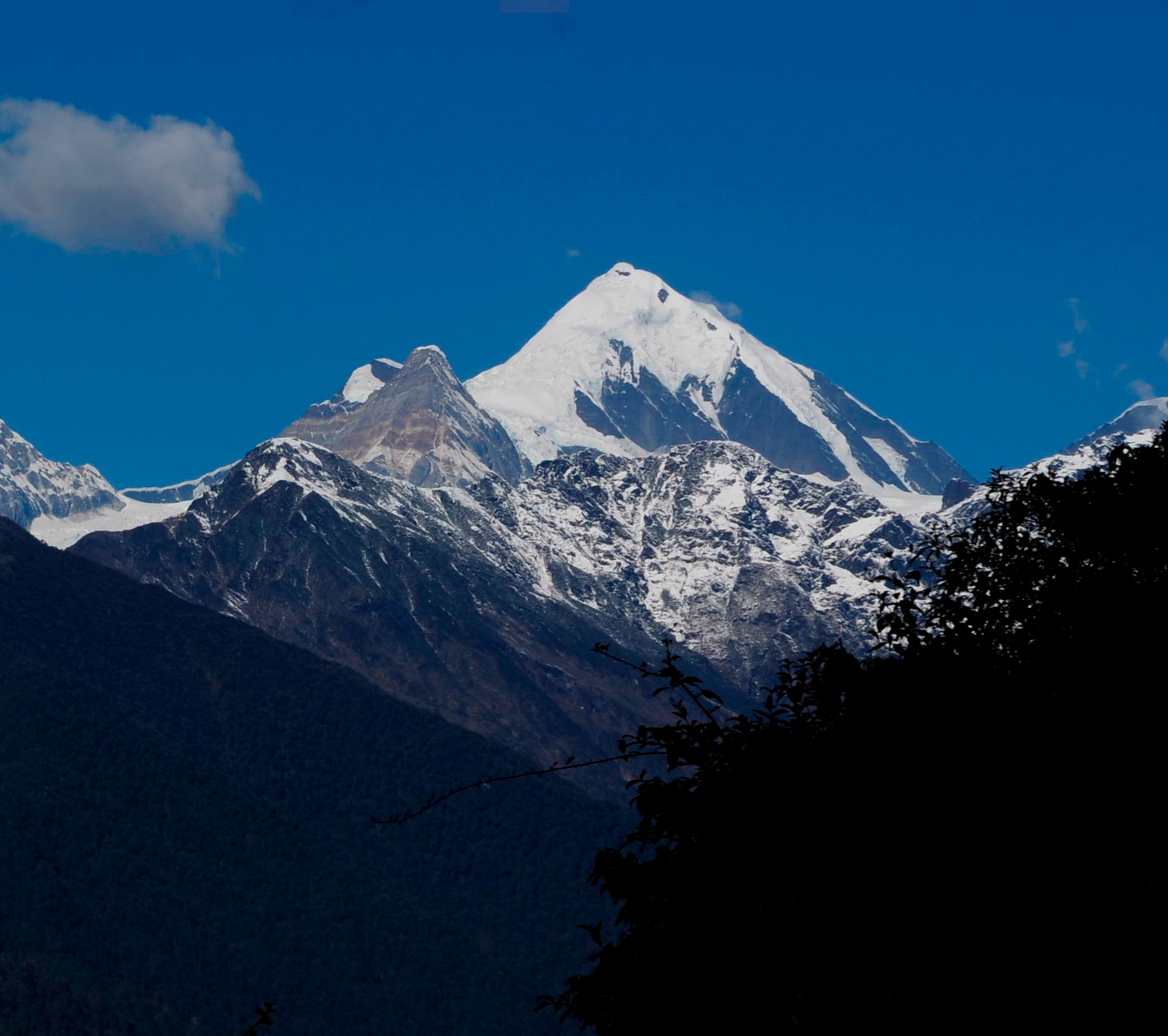
Kawang Gyang/Khyarisatam East Kameng district, Arunachal Pradesh, India

No	Peak	Country	Elevation (m)	Prominence (m)	Col (m)
1	Namcha Barwa	China	7,782	4,106	3676
2	Gangkhar Puensum	Bhutan / China	7,570	2,995	4575
3	Kangto	India / China	7,060	2,195	4865
4	Noijin Kangsang	China	7,191	2,145	5046
5	Chomolhari	Bhutan / China	7,326	2,077	5249
6	Yarla Shampo	China	6,636	1,805	4831
7	Tongshanjiabu	Bhutan / China	7,207	1,757	5450
8	Nyegyi Kansang	India / China	6,970	1,752	5295
9	Khyarisatam	India / China	6,870		
10	Point 5980	India / China	5,980	1,747	4233
11	Tarlha Ri	China	6,777	1,697	5080
12	HP Dafla Range	India	3,776	1,684	2092
13	Point 5641	India / China	5,641	1,681	3960
14	Kula Kangri	Bhutan / China	7,553	1,669	5884
15	Tarka La	Bhutan	4,735	1,624	3111
16	Kazi Razi	China	6,505	1,561	4944
17	Point 6215	China	6,215	1,521	4694
18	Point 5840	China	5,840	1,511	4329

== Sources ==
- Western list
- Eastern list
- Map
