= Goruk Pordung =

Indian politician

Goruk Pordung is an Indian politician who served as a member of the 10th Arunachal Pradesh Assembly from the Bameng Assembly constituency. In the 2019 Arunachal Pradesh Legislative Assembly election, he defeated Kumar Waii by a margin of 393 votes. In the 2024 Arunachal Pradesh Legislative Assembly election, he lost to Kumar Waii by a margin of 635 votes.

== Electoral performance ==
| Election | Constituency | Party | Result | Votes % | Opposition Candidate | Opposition Party | Opposition vote % | Ref |
|---|---|---|---|---|---|---|---|---|
| 2019 | Bameng | BJP | Won | 51.60% | Kumar Waii | NPP | 47.58% | |

== Controversy ==
In 2019, a case was registered against him for raping a doctor. In December 2019, Gauhati High Court rejected his bail. In January 2020, Supreme Court of India ordered a Special Investigation Team probe against him. In February 2021, the court granted him interim bail.
