= Par River (Arunachal Pradesh) =

River in India

The Par River is a river of Arunachal Pradesh in northeast India. It has a basin of 164,800 square kilometres (63,600 sq mi), of which 69,733 square kilometres (26,924 sq mi) (42%) are forested (2005 data). Its main tributaries are the Pang and Nimte rivers. It joins the Subansiri River(where?) and thus eventually the Brahmaputra.

== See also ==
- Puroik people
