= Parbati Parbat =

Mountain in Himachal Pradesh, India

- Location within Himachal Pradesh Location within India

Highest point
- Elevation: 6,633 m (21,762 ft)
- Prominence: 2,093 m (6,867 ft)
- Isolation: 79.23 km (49.23 mi)
- Listing: Mountains of India; Ultra
- Coordinates: 32°5′N 77°44′E

Geography
- Country: India
- State: Himachal Pradesh
- Parent range: Punjab Himalayas

Parbati Parbat is a mountain in Himachal Pradesh, India. It is an ultra-prominent peak and is the 173rd highest in Asia. It has an elevation of 6,633 m (21,762 ft).

In September 2004, a team of 10 people led by Lovraj Singh Dharamshaktu reached a point up the mountain in whiteout conditions. They placed a snow stick there and returned on September 21 and saw two more higher points that they could not reach.

== See also ==
- List of ultras of the Himalayas
