= Nyegyi Kansang =

Mountain in India

Katoie Gyang
- Nyegyi Kangtsang (Tibetan language)
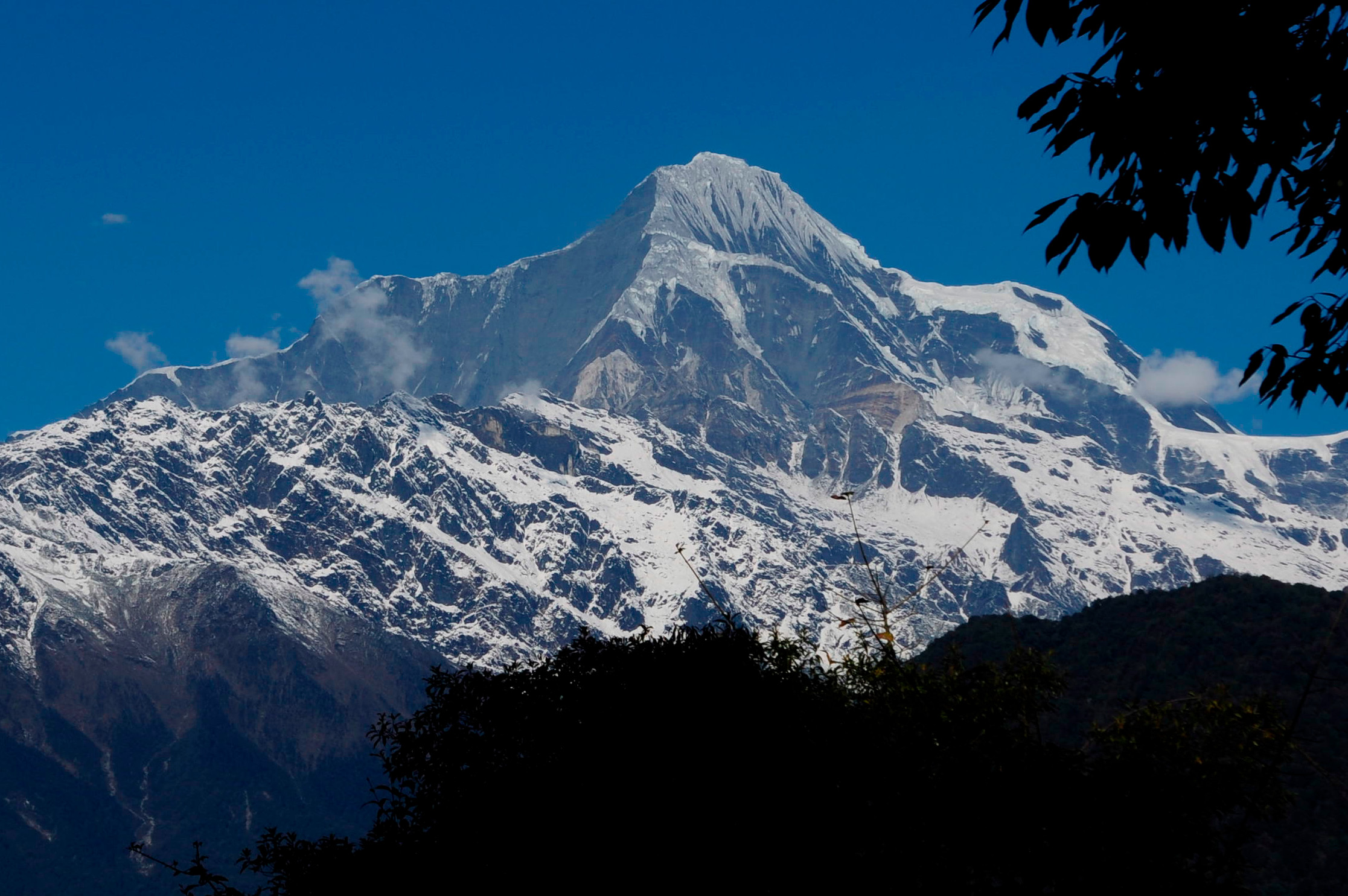
- Katoie Gyang or Kra Daadi photographed from the gorge of the Kameng/Katoie Kua Pi by Chintan Sheth on 12 December 2020.

Highest point
- Elevation: 7,047 m (23,120 ft)
- Prominence: 1,752 m (5,748 ft)
- Listing: Ultra
- Coordinates: 27°56′12″N 92°40′00″E

Naming
- Native name: Kra Daadi (Nyishi)

Geography
- Location within India
- Location: Arunachal Pradesh, India
- Parent range: Eastern Himalayas

Nyegyi Kangtsang (Puroik: Katoie Gyang; Nyishi: Kra-Daadi) is a mountain of the Eastern Himalayas located in East Kameng district of Arunachal Pradesh state of India on the border with Tibet.

== Location ==
The peak is referred to as Katoie Gyang by the Puroik people and Kra-Daadi or Wapra Kra-Daadi by Nyishi tribes in East Kameng district of Arunachal Pradesh. It has an elevation of 7,047 m (23,120 ft).

Katoie Gyang is one of the highest mountains in Arunachal Pradesh. The Kameng or Kaming (as referred to by Nyishi people) or Katoie Kwa Pi as referred to by Puroik people, is one of the most important rivers in Arunachal Pradesh. The Kameng or Katoie Kwa Pi is fed by several glaciers such as Katoie Gyang Glacier on the eastern flank of Katoie Gyang. The northern flank of the mountain is drained by the Subansiri. It is one of the three major peaks of the Kangto massif.

== Climbing history ==
On October 23, 1995, a five-member Indian expedition led by MP Yadav claimed to have succeeded in the first ascent of the Nyegi Kantsang over the northeast ridge. However, it was later found that the team reached a point about 600 metres below the main summit, and the peak is still unclimbed.

== See also ==
- List of ultras of the Himalayas
