= Bhalu Lek =

Mountain in Nepal

- Location within Karnali Province Location within Nepal

Highest point
- Elevation: 5,425 m (17,799 ft)
- Prominence: 1,643 m (5,390 ft)
- Parent peak: Kanjiroba (6883 m)
- Isolation: 0.86 km (0.53 mi)
- Listing: Mountains of Nepal; Ultra
- Coordinates: 28°59′N 82°24′E

Geography
- Country: Nepal
- Province: Karnali
- Parent range: Western Nepal Himalayas

Bhalu Lek is a mountain located in Karnali, Nepal. It is an ultra-prominent peak and is the 452nd highest in Asia. It has an elevation of 5,425 metres (17,799 ft).

== See also ==
- List of ultras of the Himalayas
