= Changla =

Mountain in Nepal/China

- Kubi Gangri; Lachama Chuli
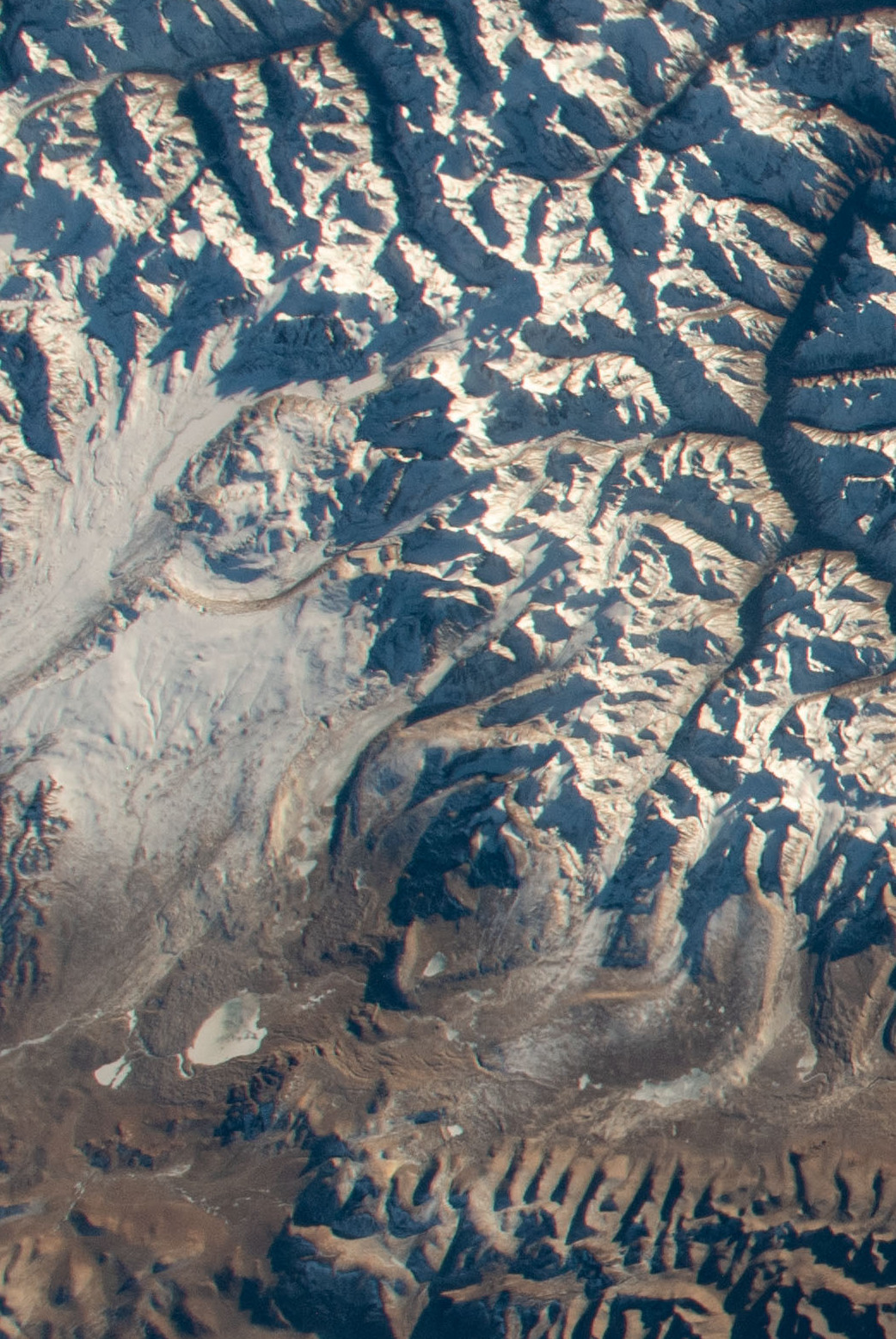
- Satellite image of the Changla Himal range

Highest point
- Elevation: 6,721 m (22,051 ft)
- Prominence: 1,657 m (5,436 ft)
- Listing: Ultra
- Coordinates: 30°08′15″N 82°11′45″E

Geography
- Location within Karnali Province Location within Nepal Location within China
- Location: China-Nepal border
- Parent range: Himalayas

Climbing
- First ascent: 2007

Changla, also known as Kubi Gangri or Lachama Chuli, is a mountain in the Changla Himal range of the Himalayas. It has a summit elevation of 6,721 metres (22,051 ft) above sea level and is located on the China-Nepal border.

== Naming ==
Changla is also known as Kubi Gangri, and Lachama Chuli in Nepal. It is called as Dong Dong by the Tibetans. A different peak with the name of Changla, which rises to 6,563 m (21,532 ft), is located in the same mountain group, to the north of Kubi Gangri. According to Japanese mountaineer Sadao Yoshinaga, changes to the Nepal–China border in 1979 and subsequent revision to the maps issued by the Nepalese resulted in the historical name of Changla being applied to a different peak. Hence, the 6,721 m (22,051 ft) mountain, which was identified as Changla on the older maps, was subsequently applied to the 6,563 m (21,532 ft) peak in the Nepalese records.

== Geography ==
Changla is a mountain on the Nepal–China border in the Changla Himal range of the Himalayas, in northwestern Nepal. It rises to an elevation of 6,721 m (22,051 ft), and is the highest peak of the Changla Himal group. It has a topographic prominence of 1,657 m (5,436 ft).

== Mountaineering ==
In 1983, a Japanese expedition team led by Kyoko Endo, attempted the first ascent of Changla. The team consisting of seven Japanese and three Nepalese, approached the mountain from Simikot and established four camps above the base camp along the southwest ridge. On 28 May, four expedition members and two Sherpas reached a high point of 6,302 m (20,676 ft) on the mountain. They abandoned the ascent to the summit as they had run out of fuel and ropes to ascent the difficult snow ridge with hidden crevasses and large sections of ice above.

In September 1998, an expedition of the Osaka Alpine Club led by Sadao Yoshinaga came to the Changla Himal to explore the mountain ranges along the Nepal–Tibet border. The team reached the summit of the Changla Southwest peak at 6,162 m (20,217 ft) before returning.

In 2007, a Japanese expedition team led by Atushi Senda and Toyoshi Wada. The team consiting of Senda and six others reached the summit of the mountain via the eastern ridge. The team was part of an expedition which went to chart out the headwaters of the Kubi Tsangpo river.

== See also ==
- List of mountains in China
- List of mountains in Nepal
- List of ultras of the Himalayas
