= Bameng =

Coordinates: 27.545°N 92.946°E

Bameng is a village in East Kameng district of Arunachal Pradesh

Bameng is one of the 60 constituencies of Legislative Assembly of Arunachal Pradesh. Name of current MLA (August-2016) of this constituency is Goruk pordung.
