= Kameng River =

River in northeast India

The Kameng River (previously also called Bharali River, now called Kameng in Arunachal Pradesh and Jiabharali (Jia Bharali) in Assam) in the eastern Himalayan mountains, originates in Tawang district from the glacial lake below snow-capped Gori Chen mountain 27°48′36″N 92°26′38″E, elevation 6,300 metres (20,669 ft), on the India-Tibet border and flows through Bhalukpong circle of West Kameng District, Arunachal Pradesh and Sonitpur District of Assam, India. It becomes a braided river in its lower reaches and is one of the major tributaries of the Brahmaputra River, joining it at Tezpur, just east of the Kolia Bhomora Setu bridge.

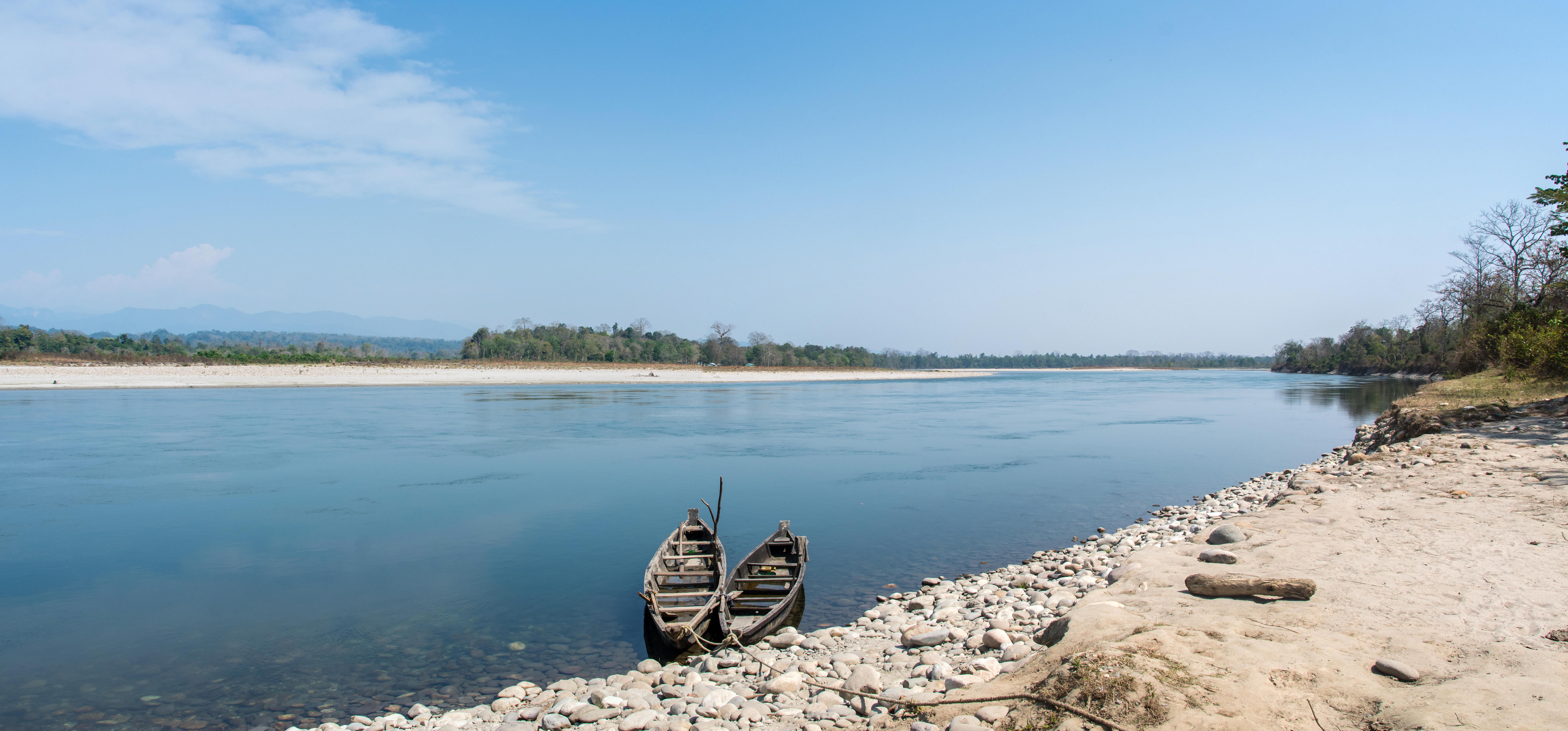
Kameng river

The Kameng forms the boundary between the East Kameng and West Kameng districts and is also the boundary between the Sessa Orchid Sanctuary and Eaglenest Wildlife Sanctuary to its west and the Pakke Tiger Reserve to the east. The Dafla Hills are east and the Aka Hills (home of Aka tribe) are west of the Kameng River. The entire stretch of forest along the Bhalukpong–Bomdila highway on the west bank of the river in West Kameng has vanished in the last few years though the forest across the river continues to be in a healthy state.

The Kameng River is about 264 kilometres (164 mi) long with a drainage basin of about 11,843 square kilometres (4,573 sq mi).

== Tributaries ==
The eastern half of Eaglenest-Sessa Wildlife sanctuaries is drained by the Tippi Naala (Tippi River) which joins Kameng River at the village of Tippi on the Bhalukpong-Bomdila Highway. The other major rivers flowing through West Kameng District, the Tenga, Bichom and Dirang Chu, are tributaries of the Kameng.

== Maps ==
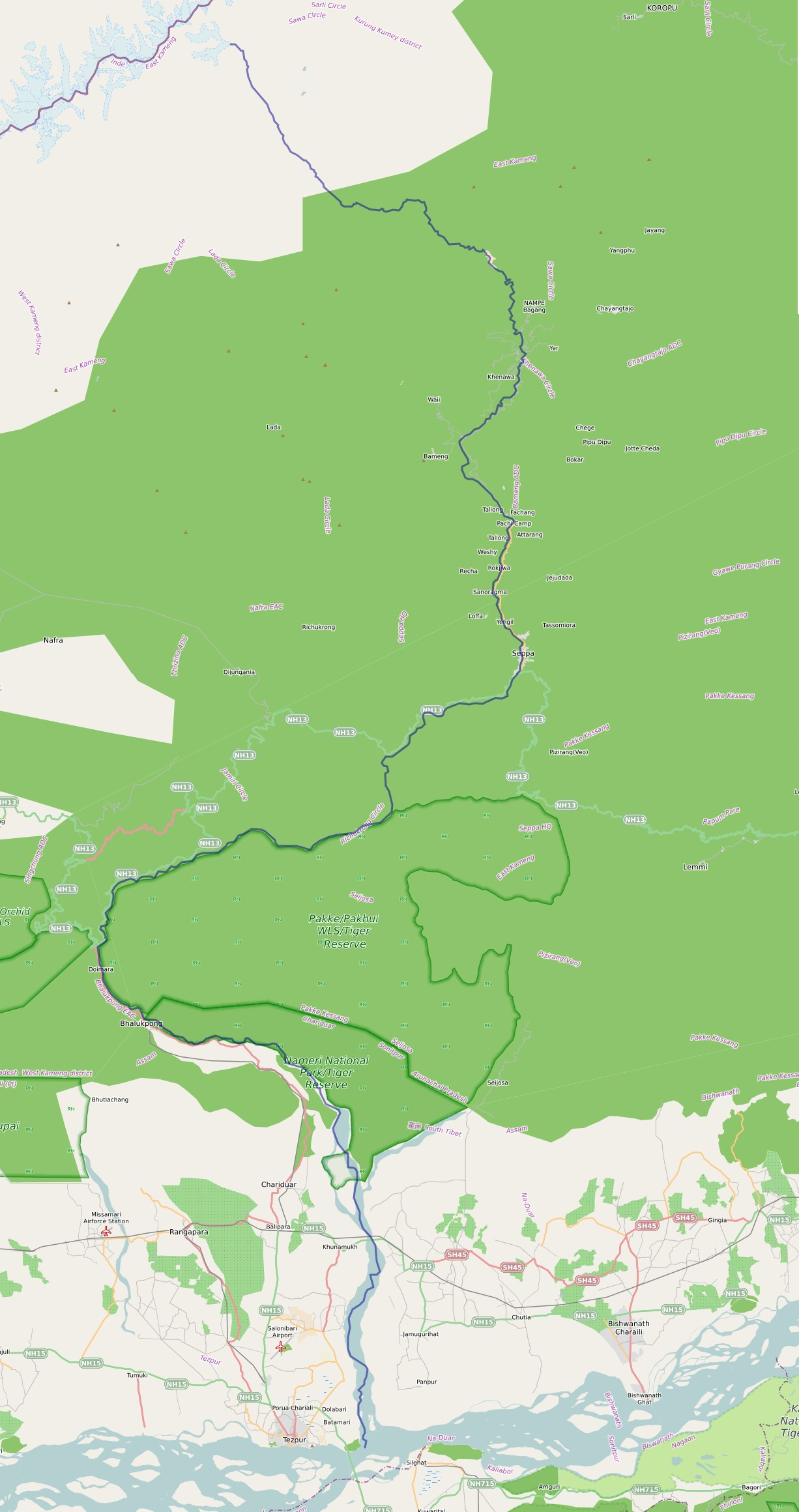

== See also ==
- Nyegyi Kansang
