= Puroik people =

Culture group of Tibet and Northeast India

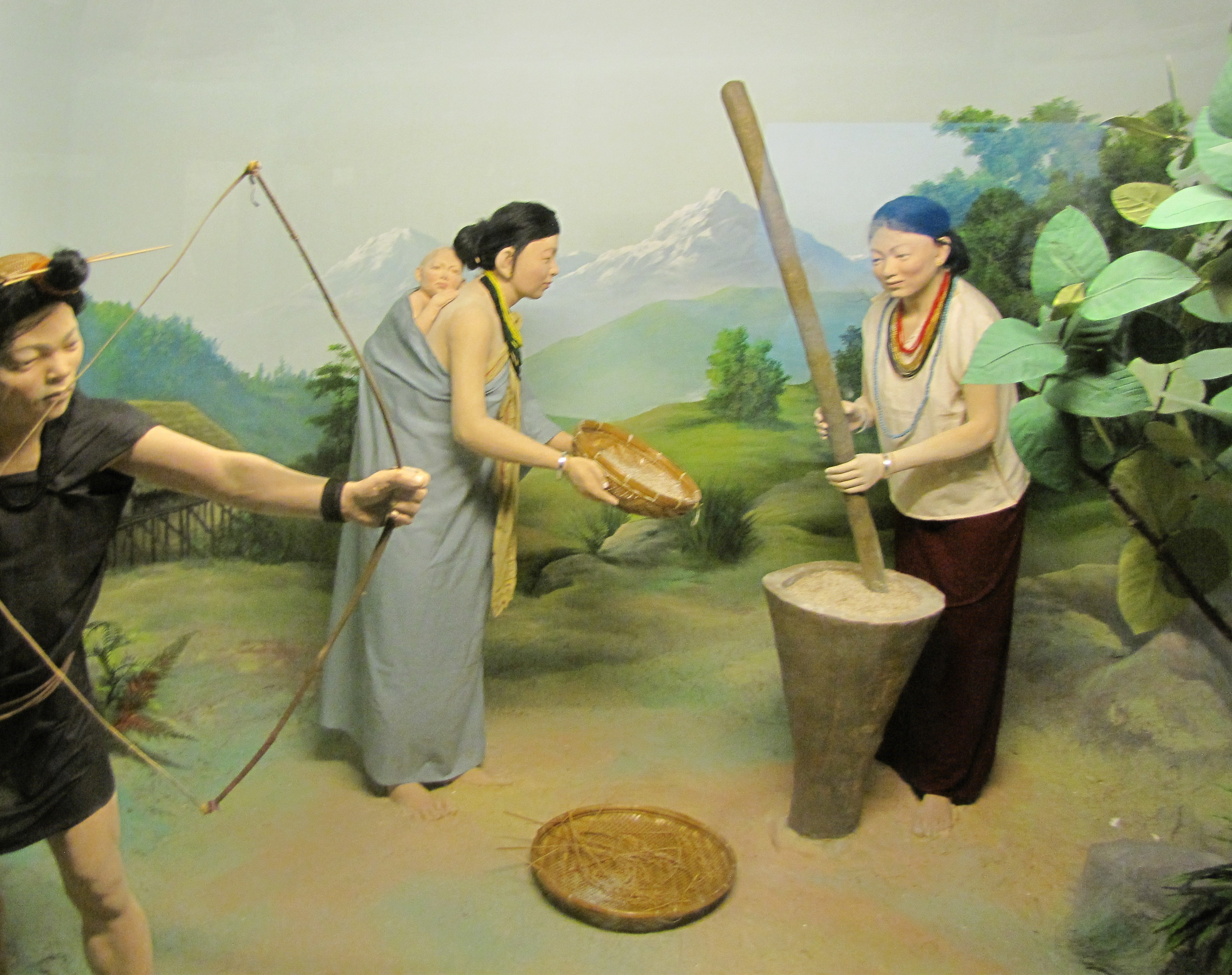
"Diorama" exhibit featuring wax figures on the Puroik at Jawaharlal Nehru Museum, Itanagar.

The Puroik are a tribe of the hill-tracts of Arunachal Pradesh in India. They speak the Puroik language. The Puroik people are found in an estimated 53 villages in the districts of Subansiri and Upper Subansiri, Papumpare, Kurung Kumey and East Kameng along the upper reaches of the Par River. They number more than 10,000 people according to the latest survey.

They are a "Scheduled Tribe" in India. They claim kinship with the Khowa (Bugun). Economically, they are at a transitional stage between a hunter gatherer lifestyle and agriculturalism. They retain their traditional religion, with some adherence to either Hinduism or Christianity.
