= East Kameng district =

- District of Arunachal Pradesh
- Interactive map of East Kameng district
- Country: India
- State: Arunachal Pradesh
- Headquarters: Seppa

Area
  - Total: 4,134 km^{2} (1,596 sq mi)

Population (2011)
  - Total: 78,690
  - Density: 19.03/km^{2} (49.30/sq mi)

Demographics
  - Literacy: 62.5%
  - Sex ratio: 1012
- Time zone: UTC+05:30 (IST)
- Website: eastkameng.nic.in

East Kameng district is one of districts of Arunachal Pradesh state in northeastern, India. It shares an international border with Tibet in the north and district borders with West Kameng district to the west, Pakke-Kessang district to the south, Kurung Kumey district to the east, Papum Pare district to the southeast. Pakke-Kessang district was bifurcated from East Kameng district on 1 December 2018.

== History ==
The area around the Kameng river has at various times come under the control and influence of the Mon kingdom; Tibet Aka and Nishi chiefs would exert control over the area whenever no major political powers dominated the area.

The Kameng Frontier Division was renamed the Kameng District. The Political Officer was also redesignated as the Deputy Commissioner of Kameng. The Kameng district was bifurcated between East Kameng and West Kameng on 1 June 1980.

== Geography ==
Before the bifurcation, East Kameng district occupied an area of 4,134 square kilometres (1,596 sq mi) Like West Kameng, the East Kameng climate ranges from arid in the tundra of the north through a cool temperate climate to a humid subtropical climate in the southern sub-himalayan hills bordering Assam.

== Transport ==
The 2,000-kilometre-long (1,200 mi) proposed Mago-Thingbu to Vijaynagar Arunachal Pradesh Frontier Highway along the McMahon Line, (will intersect with the proposed East-West Industrial Corridor Highway) and will pass through this district, alignment map of which can be seen here and here.

== Economy ==
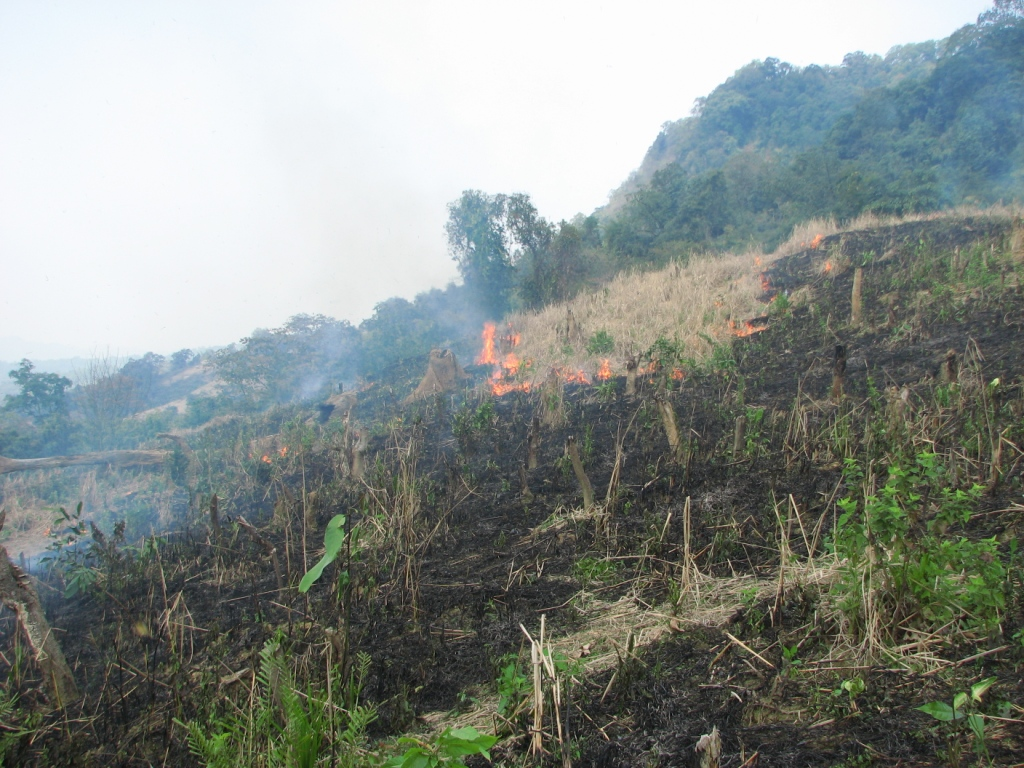
Jhum fire

Most tribes practice a form of slash and burn agriculture known as Jhum. After clearing the land, crops like barley and rice are planted, and fruit trees are planted to make orchards.

With the advancement of modern technology, horticulture based on apples and oranges is becoming increasingly popular. Today, temperate and sub-tropical fruits are planted in orchards with chemical fertilizers.

Fishing activities first started between 1965–66 and gained momentum in November 1980, when the Fishery Department first started functioning independently. As of today, the Fishery development activities are headed by a District Fishery Development Officer, originally the Superintendent of Fisheries.

== Divisions ==
The district's administrative divisions are Chayangtajo, Sawa, Khenewa, Bameng, Lada, Gyawe Purang, Pipu, Seppa, and Richukhrong.

There are 5 Arunachal Pradesh Legislative Assembly constituencies located in this district: Bameng, Chayangtajo, Seppa East, and Seppa West. All of these are part of Arunachal West Lok Sabha constituency.

== Demographics ==
Historical population
Year	Pop.	±% p.a.
1961	28,234	—
1971	35,134	+2.21%
1981	42,736	+1.98%
1991	50,395	+1.66%
2001	57,179	+1.27%
2011	78,690	+3.24%

=== Population ===
According to the 2011 census East Kameng district has a population of 78,690, roughly equal to the nation of Dominica. This gives it a ranking of 624th in India (out of a total of 640). The district has a population density of 19 inhabitants per square kilometre (49/sq mi) . Its population growth rate over the decade 2001–2011 was 37.14%. East Kameng has a sex ratio of 1,012 females for every 1,000 males, and a literacy rate of 62.48%.

East Kameng is inhabited by various tribes of similar origin but with distinct cultures and beliefs, practising the Donyi-Polo religion. The most populous of these, the Nishi, are scattered throughout the entire district. Other tribes, especially the Miji, Puroik and the Aka, are found in regions near the Kameng river.

Since independence, much of the population has relocated to the district capital, Seppa. With the coming of modernism, festivals such as the Sarok of the Aka, Nyokum of the Nishi, Jonglam-Ponklam and Chindang of the Miji and the Gumkum-Gumpa are celebrated in full flair in Seppa.

Religion in East Kameng District (2011)
1. Christianity (47.2%)
2. Donyi-Polo (35.4%)
3. Hinduism (15.7%)
4. Islam (0.83%)
5. Buddhism (0.57%)
6. Sikhism (0.05%)
7. Jainism (0.03%)
8. Not Stated (0.24%)

=== Languages ===
==== Nyishi ====
The Nishi is a Tibeto-Burman language spoken by approximately 800–1200 people in the East Kameng district who live among the Aka (Hruso), but their language is distantly related, with distinct words for basic vocabulary. Although it has resemblances to Tani further to the east, it appears to be a separate branch of Tibeto-Burman. Koro is unlike any language in the various branches of the Tibeto-Burman family. Researchers hypothesize it may have originated from a group of people enslaved and brought to the area.

Koro was recognized as a separate language in 2010 by a linguistic team of David Harrison, Gregory Anderson, and Ganesh Murmu while documenting two Hruso languages (Aka and Miji) as part of National Geographic's "Enduring Voices" project. It was apparently noticed by earlier researchers.

Languages of East Kameng (2011)
1. Nyishi (83.3%)
2. Nepali (2.40%)
3. Hindi (2.31%)
4. Bhotia (2.15%)
5. Rai (2.13%)
6. Others (7.68%)

== Tourism ==
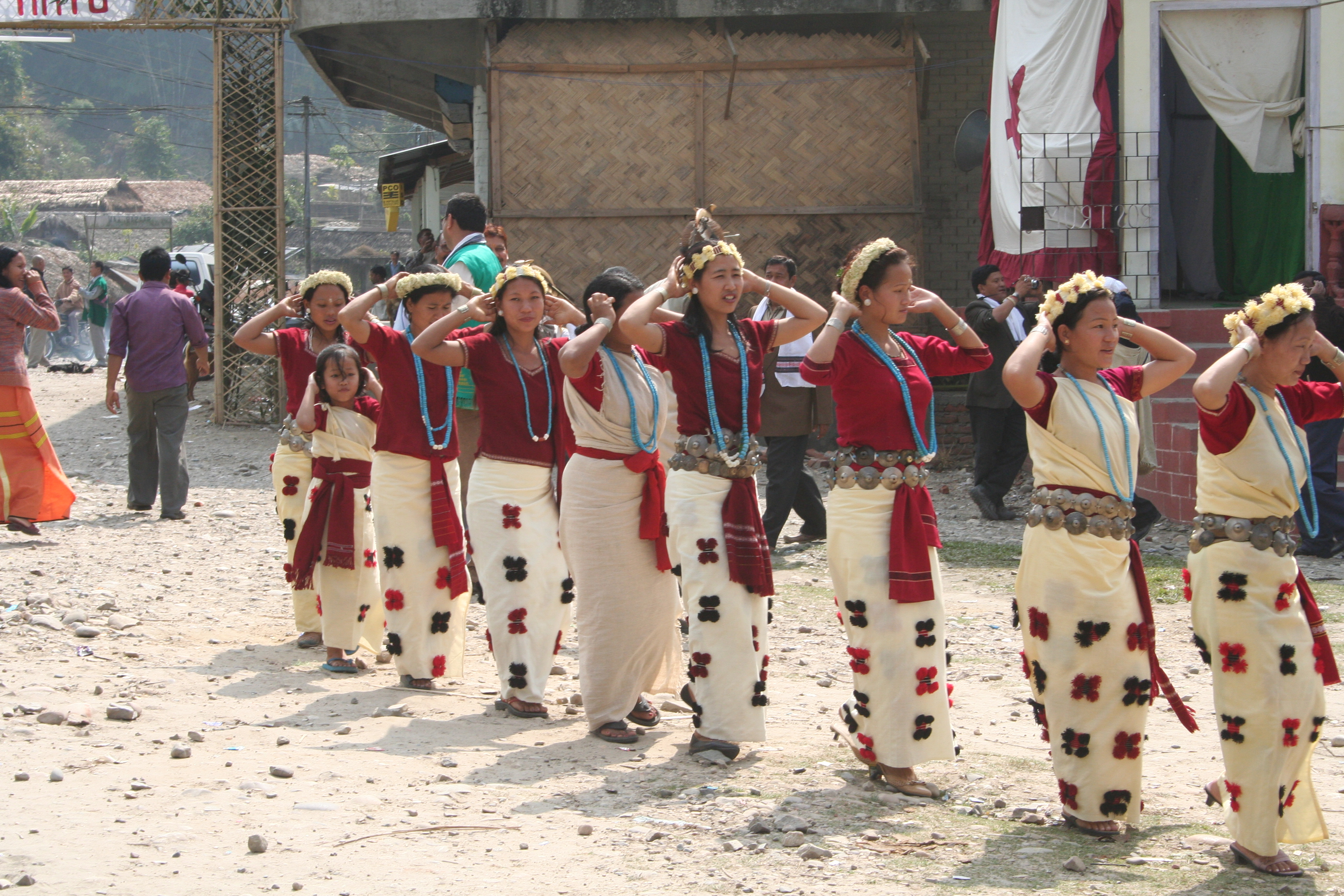
Nyishi People

The whole district is in picturesque hills covered with greenery. Tourist attractions in the district are in Papu Valley along the Papu River, among those Chayangtajo 81 km north and Bameng 48 km north of Seppo are hill stations connected by a motorable road.

Papu Valley is one of the most spectacular places in the district. Papu Valley got its name from the snake-like curvy streams of the Papu River. A vast field of rice covers the whole area of Papu Valley. Some of the major villages in this valley are Sede, Seba, Nere etc.

Kameng River is popular for fishing, which requires a fishing license from the district administration.
