= East-West Industrial Corridor Highway, Arunachal Pradesh =

Major junctions
- West end: Bhairabkunda in Udalguri district in Assam
- East end: Ruksin in East Siang district of Arunachal Pradesh

Location
- Country: India
- States: Arunachal Pradesh, Assam
- Major cities: Bhairabkunda, Ruksin

Highway system
- Roads in India; Expressways; National; State; Asian

East-West Industrial Corridor Highway of Arunachal Pradesh, a 2-lane and 966.78 km long including existing 274.20 km Pasighat-Manmao route, is a proposed highway across the lower foothills of Arunachal Pradesh state in India, from Bhairabkunda in Assam at the tri-junction of Bhutan-Assam-Arunachal Pradesh in the west to the Kanubari tri-junction of Nagaland-Assam-Arunachal Pradesh in the east.

== Background ==
The Government of Arunachal Pradesh (GoAP) is responsible for preparing DPR which has planning, survey, environmental and land acquisition approvals as prerequisites. Once DPR is ready, these projects are granted approval by the Ministry of Road Transport and Highways (MoRTH). Some of these projects subsume the existing or under-construction roads constructed by BRO, NHAI, Ministry of Ports, Shipping and Waterways (MoPSW), CPWD and other states of India or other nations. Hence, right from the inception, these projects require GoAP to facilitate coordinated efforts of multiple entities including MoRTH, NHAI, MoPSW, MoDNER, CPWD, state PWDs, BRO, MoD, NSA, Ministry of External Affairs (MoEA), and Ministry of Environment, Forest and Climate Change (MoEFCC). BJP-led Government of India (GoI) and GoAP were trying to expedite some of these projects. Since some these are constructed by BRO, once the paved basic road has been constructed by BRO ideally these should be handed over to NHAI and state PWDs (with the status of NH and SH accessible to civilians) so that BRO can focus on its core activity of building newer strategic border roads in the inaccessible areas. This is not done always due to turf war by BRO and poor efforts (poor justification to MoD and poor overall coordination) by the concerned state govt, resulting in lack of connectivity optimisation and poor collective ROI for India. Hence, persistent efforts by GoAP and firm backing by GoI are key to success, timely completion and maximisation of ROI of these projects.

=== Important road projects of Arunachal Pradesh ===
These major highways, spanning across the entire length of Arunachal Pradesh, are key to Arunachal Pradesh's development, India's national security and international Look East connectivity.

- East-West Industrial Corridor Highway (this project):
  Proposed highway which runs long foothills of Himalaya in lower in Arunachal Pradesh. As of 2021, some phases are under survey and DPR while others are yet to be planned or surveyed.
- Trans-Arunachal Highway:
  Partially existing highway which roughly divides Arunachal Pradesh in upper two-third and lower one-third portions. As of 2021, some phases are under survey and DPR while others are yet to be planned or surveyed.
- Arunachal Central Highway:
  Partially existing highway which roughly divides Arunachal Pradesh in two equal halves. Parts of its alignment could be taken from the India-China Border Roads (ICBR) being constructed by BRO. As of 2021, there were no media reports of any integrated planning or surveys by GoAP except the ICBR projects being undertaken by the BRO in an isolated manner.
  It runs from Radi (in Bhutan, existing highway from Radi connects to Silliguri Corridor via Trashigang) to Sakteng Arunachal-Bhutan border (greenfield route),
  Sakteng-Lubrang-Dirang direct alignment (partially greenfield), Dirang-Khenewa HQ (greenfield, via Thembang-Khoina-Nafra(circle HQ)-Koyo-BarmengHQ),
  Khenewa-Yangfo-Koloriang (upgrade existing, some ICBRs, with additional Yangfo-Zero Point partially greenfield spur),
  Koloriang-Tato (greenfield, some ICBRs, Tato is HQ of Shi Yomi district),
  Tato-Payum-YingkongHQ-Mariyang (existing Tato-Payum, greenfield Payum-Gashing-Jengging, Jengging-Yingking-Mariyang (existing),
  Mariyang-Etalin (direct greenfield alignment, from Mariyang or Damro-Boga-Lasing then to Awoka-Atiyi-Etalin HQ),
  Etalin-Apanli-Fishtail-II-Changlagam/Desali (upgrade of existing village road west-to-east Etain-Anose-Sunil-Apanli-Malinye-Chibuni to east of Chibuni at confluence of river, at confluence turn south and go on top of western-most spur of Fishtail-II ridge were river originates, 2 spur roads from Fishtail ridge top - one over the ridge to southwest to Desali HQ to NH-313 and second spur from ridge top to southeast to Changlagam HQ along the river, build road in interim and all-weather tunnel as long-term connectivity),
  Changlagam-Chirang-Walong (greenfield), Walong-Krosam (existing), Krosam-Namdapha Camp (greenfield), to Longyi.
- Arunachal Frontier Highway:
  Proposed highway which runs long and as close as possible to the India-China LAC. Parts of its alignment could be taken from the ICBR being constructed by BRO. As of 2021, there were no media reports of any integrated planning or surveys by Arunachal Pradesh government except the ICBR projects being undertaken by the BRO in an isolated manner.

=== Related connectivity ===
Following either intersect with or synergetically enhance the wider connectivity of this highway.

- Arunachal Pradesh connectivity projects
  - Bhalukpong-Tawang railway, under-construction
- Northeast connectivity projects
  - Northeast Connectivity projects
  - Look-East Connectivity projects
  - North-South and East-West Corridor
  - India-Myanmar-Thailand Friendship Highway
  - BCIM Economic Corridor The proposed East-West Industrial Corridor Highway, Arunachal Pradesh and the Arunachal Frontier Highway would be connected to the BCIM Economic Corridor Highway.
  - Asian Highway Network
  - List of bridges on Brahmaputra River

== Route alignment ==
Running through the foothills across at least 12 districts of Arunachal Pradesh, it will serve as an industrial corridor for the people residing in the area. The 692.58 km will be constructed in phase I and II, and remaining in phase III and IV as follows:

- Phase-I: Pasighat-Naharlagun-Seijosa-Bhalukpong-Bhairabkunda
  545.45 km long Phase-1 has been subdivided into following 4 packages:
  - Package-1: Pasighat-Naharlagun
    308.45 km long from Pasighat to Naharlagun.
  - Package-2A: Naharlagun-Seijosa
    101.70 km long from Naharlagun to Seijosa in the Pakke-Kessang district.
  - Package-2B: Seijosa to Bhalukpong
    39.84 km long from Seijosa to Bhalukpong.
  - Package-2C: Bhalukpong-Bhairabkund
    95.46 km long from Bhalukpong to Bhairabkund which lies partially across West Kameng district of Arunachal Pradesh and Udalguri district of Assam.
- Phase-II: Manmao-Khonsa-Longding-Kanubari
  147.13 km long from Tirap Gate at Manmao (Changlang district) to Kanubari (Longding district) via Khonsa (Tirap district) - Longding (Longding district).
- Phase-III: Wakro-Namdhapa-Miao-Maithong-Kharsang-Nampong
  Though there is an existing longer alternate 274.20 km long detour of NH standard highways from Pasighat in East Siang district to Manmao in Changlang district, most of this falls outside Arunachal Paradesh. The proposed shorter direct route within Arunachal Pradesh has been subdivided as follows.
  - Package-3A: Wakro-Camp Namdhapa-Miao-Maithong
    Upgrade of existing route to NH standard, requires greenfield bridge over Noadhiang River at Miao.
  - Package-3B: Maithong-Kharsang
    Upgrade of existing route to NH standard, part of which is already of NH standard.
  - Package-3C: Maithong-Nayang-New Khamlang-Khamkai-Nampong
    Upgrade of existing village road along upper course of Namphuk river on its western side via Nayang to NH-315.

- Phase-IV: Sadiya Sille-Oyan Bridge (Sille-Oyan-Chilling Madhupur-Sadia new bridge over Brahmputra river)-Bhupen Hazarika Bridge (link existing bridge via Na Gaon-Disai Nadiyal)-Alubari bridge (upgrade existing bridge to 2-lane from Tezu check post to Chongkham):
  To bring down existing 180 km Sille-Oyan to Sadiya distance to a mere 40 km (140 km reduction), requires greenfield Sadiya Sille-Oyan bridge and greenfield road from Sille-Oyan at NH-515 to Na-Gaon and Dhoom Pathar at NH-115 as well as the conversion/notification of existing NH-13 to NH-15 link road at Chongkham in Arunachal Pradesh to NH. Sille-Oyan is a circle H in East Siang district of Arunachal, Chilling Madhupur and Sadiya are in Tinsukia district of Assam, Sadiya is an important port town at the northern beginning of National Waterway 2 (NW2). This route will significantly shorten the distance in northern Assam and eastern Arunachal Pradesh ion this strategically important bottle neck area which also has an important port at NW2.
- Phase-V - eastern extension: connectivity from east Assam to southeast Arunachal Pradesh (Nampong, Vijoynagar and Dong-Walong-Kibithu)
  - Phase-V(a): Bhupen Hazarika Bridge-Bordumsa- Kharsang-Jairampur
    It will provide direct connectivity from Sadiya to Nampong by directly connecting NH-15, NH-215 and NH-315 through a shorter route.
  - Phase-V(b): Namsai-Namleng-Diyun-Camp Namdhapa with new bridge near Namleng
    It will provide direct connectivity from Namsai to Vijaynagar, also connect Namleng to Bordumsa by new greenfield bridge.
  - Phase-V(c): Bordumsa-Namleng-Wakro direct route with new bridge near Namleng
    It will provide direct & shortest connectivity from Bordumsa to Wakro, it requires a new greenfield bridge between Bordumsa and Namleng (bridge also included in Phase-V(b)).
  - Phase-V(d): Nampong-Kamkhai-along Namphuk river (Changlai & Korviwa)-new bridge on Nao Dihing river (Yapawphum or Lake view to 64 mile)-Tusar Valley (along Namdapha river)-Krosam (tunnel between Tusar Valley & Krosam) direct route
    It will provide direct & shortest connectivity from Tizit-Longding-Khonsa-Nampong to Vijoynagar and Walong-Dong-Kibithu.

== Future expansion for wider national connectivity ==
- Phase-VI - central Assam extension: connectivity between southeastern Arunachal Pradesh to central Assam (Sivasagar)
  - Phase-VI(a) - Sivasagar (& beyond to Gogamukh-Daporijo)
    From Longding-Tizit-Longlem-Bokopukhuri greenfield shortest route and the upgrade of remaining Simaluguri-Sivasagar-Disangmukh bridge(Sivasagar-Gogamukh bridge) stretch.
- Phase-VII - western extension: connectivity between southeastern Arunachal Pradesh to Pakistan via Assam, chicken-neck Siliguri Corridor, northern West Bengal, chicken-neck Siliguri Corridor-Ludhiana expressway (already included in the Bharatmala-II plan, along India-Nepal border (north Bihar & north Uttar Pradesh), northeast Haryana and north Punjab).
  It requires upgrading existing and building new greenfield highways for the missing direct links. Will also enhance connectivity for Sikkim, Uttrakhand, Chandigarh and Himachal Pradesh. Route alignment is from:
  - Assam
    - Bhairabkunda to Udiagiri-Balisitha-Khatorbari (upgrade),
    - Shahpur-Kumarikata-Subankhata-Doomni-Manas-Gobardhan-Borgaon-Ouguri-Hatidhura-SankosTeaGarden-Hasimara-Nagrakata
  - Silliguri-Gurdaspur Expressway (Sevoke-Kurseong to Dasuya-Mukerian-Gurdaspur-Naushera), included in Bharatmala-II.
    - Assam & West Bengal: Sevoke-Kurseong-Mirik-Naxalbari(upgrade and greenfield),
    - North Bihar:
      - Pauakhali-Kaliyaganj-Forbesganj-Phulparas existing,
      - Phulparas-Madhubani greenfield,
      - Madhubani-Benpatti existing,
      - Benpatti-Sitamarhi-Dhaka-Sugauli greenfield,
      - Sugauli-Bettiah existing,
      - Bettiah-Pardauna greenfield,
    - North Uttar Pradesh
      - Padrauna-Campirganj existing,
      - Campirganj-Balacha Bazar-Tillauli-Fatehpur/Bhawaniganj greenfield,
      - Bhawaniganj-Balrampur-Shravasti-Ikauna existing, Dikauli-Lakhimpur greenfield, Khutar existing,
      - Khutar-Indarpur-Gajraula Kalan greenfield and existing to Pilibhit,
      - Pilibhit-Baheri-Bilaspur-Seohara-Bijnor-Muzaffarnagar-South-of-Deoband-Gangoh mostly greenfield.
    - Northeast Haryana
      - Indri-Jyotisar-Ismailabad upgrade existing & greenfield.
    - North Punjab
      - Devigarh-Bhunarheri-Ramgarh-Pasiana-Rohti Channa mostly greenfield,
      - Rohti Channa-Jorhepul upgrade existing, Jorhepul-Sahura-Rara Sahib-Ludhiana-Delhi–Amritsar–Katra Expressway.
- Phase-VIII - southern extension: connectivity from east Assam and southeast Arunachal Pradesh to Nagaland, southern Assam, Meghalaya, Bangladesh, central West Bengal & central Bihar
  It will connect southeastern Arunachal Pradesh to Bangladesh via Nagaland, Assam, Meghalaya and Tripura by upgrading existing highways and building new greenfield highways for the missing direct links.
  Route alignment is as follows:
  - Arunachal Pradesh
    - Longding to Tizit on NH-702 upgrade existing dirt track.
    - Nagaland
      - Tizit-Niausa-Nayasa-Mon-Walching-Tamlu-Merangkong (on NH-2)-Asangma-Waromung-Merakong-Akuk Old-Sanis HQ-Longtsung(Lohtu HQ)-Ralan Old-Ambari-Dimapur greenfield along mostly existing dirt tracks.
      - Dimapur-Hazadisa NH-129A (existing).
      - Hazadisa-Dillajee-Longplan-Langting(on NH-27 greenfield along river.
    - Assam
      - Langting-Dihangi(on NH-627) greenfield.
      - Dihangi-Silchar NH-27 existing and upgrade existing Silchar-Kalain SH-34.
    - Meghalaya
      - Kalain-Umkiyang NH-6 existing.
      - Umkiyang-Dawki-Mawlynnong-Delsora greenfield.
      - Delsora-Khakorkora-Baghmara-Dalu-Mahendraganj-Mankachar-Hatsingimari-Dubri bridge upgrade NH, SH & other roads.
    - Bangladesh
      - Hatsingimari-Kurigram road-cum-rail bridge greenfield, Hatsingimari-Kurigram-Dinhata-Cooch Behar-Jaigaon route build greenfield, Dinhata-Mathabhanga-Jalpaiguri South-Kukurjan-BangladeshNH5 route build greenfield.
      - Mahendraganj-Gaibandha road-cum-rail bridge greenfield, Mahendraganj-Gaibandha-Hili-Belurghat-India-NH512 route build greenfield.

== Six Inter-corridor highways ==
To providing missing interconnectivity between three horizontal national highways across Arunachal Pradesh - Frontier Highway, Trans-Arunachal Highway and East-West Industrial Corridor Highway - following six vertical and diagonal national highway corridors of total 2178 km length will be built, which will also provide faster access to geostrategically important areas on India-China LAC.

Listed west to east.

- Thelamara-Tawang-Nelia Highway: 402 km.
- Itakhola-Pakke-Kessang-Seppa-Parsi Parlo Highway: 391 km.
- Gogamukh-Taliha-Tato Highway: 285 km.
- Akajan-Jorging-Pango Highway: 398 km.
- Pasighat-Bishing Highway: 298 km.
- Kanubari-Longding Highway: 404 km.

== Tourism ==
The Bhalukpong-Bomdila-Tawang Tourist Circuit along the Arunachal Frontier Highway and the Nafra-Seppa-Pappu-Pasa-Pakke Valleys-Sangdupota-New Sagalee-Ziro-Yomcha Tourist Circuit along the Trans-Arunachal Highway and East-West Industrial Corridor Highway have been developed under the Swadesh Darshan Scheme.

== Current status ==
- 2015: Union Minister of MoRTH, Nitin Gadkari granted an in-principle approval.
- 2021 March: Phase-1 DPR was ready and pre-DPR survey for phase-2 was in-progress. After DPR for Package-2C was submitted to Union Highways Ministry in December 2020, approval was awaited. DPRs of package-1 and package-2A by Arunachal Pradesh government were ready but their submission to MoRTH was held up due to non-submission of encumbrance free land availability certificates from respective DCs. Package 2(B) was facing land acquisition and environmental approval issues because its proposed alignment passes through Pakke Tiger Reserve. At that time, there were no media reports of any investigation, survey or preparation of DPR for the important Phase-III, Phase-IV and other projects mentioned in the "Future expansion" section.

== See also ==
- List of national highways in India
- National Highways Development Project
- Expressways of India
- Golden Quadrilateral (GQ)
