= India–China Border Roads =

Indian government project to develop border roads

India China Border Roads
- ICBRs, ICB Roads
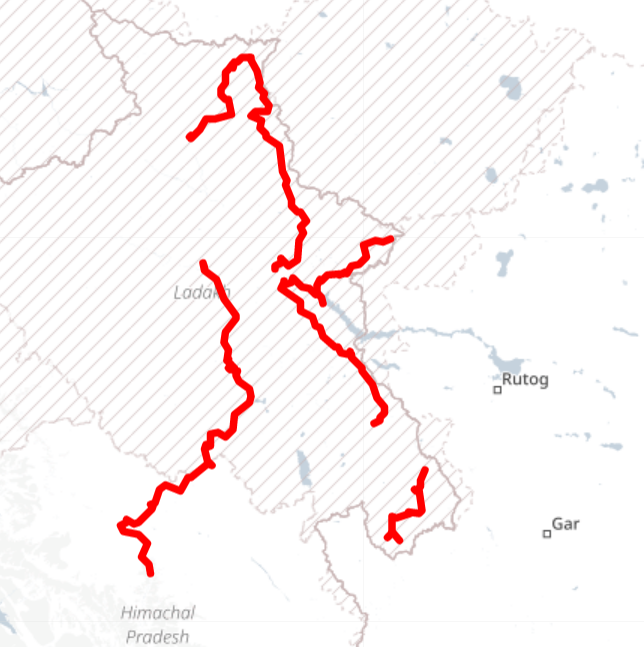
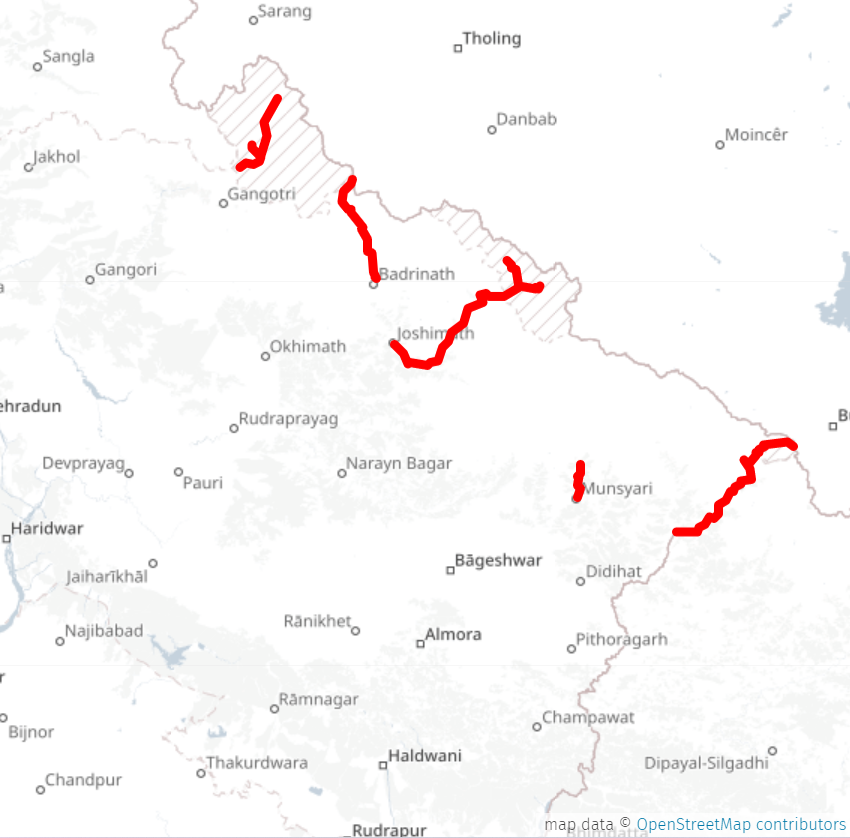
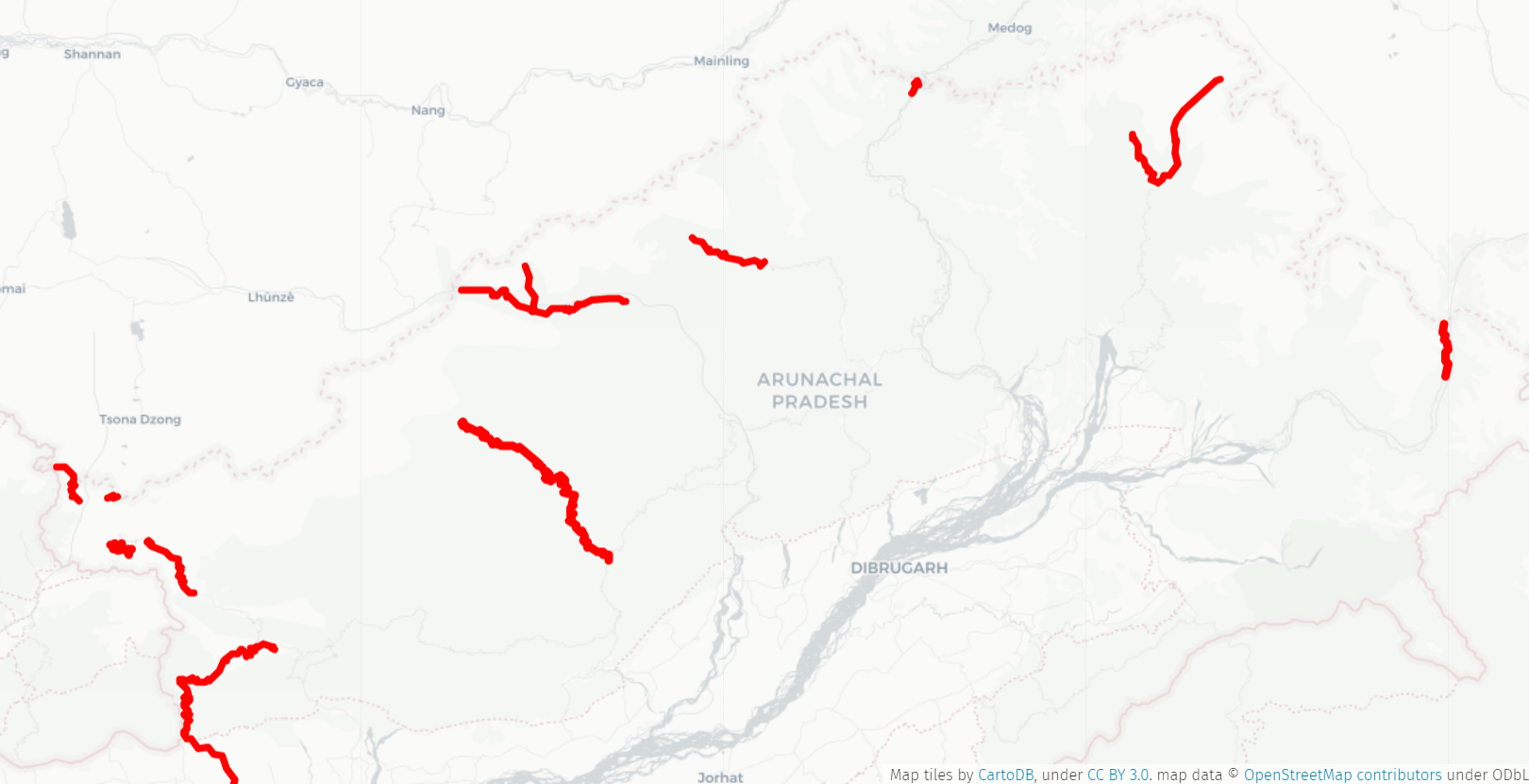
- Highlights in red for Ladakh, Uttarakhand, Arunachal Pradesh
- Type of project: Infrastructure development
- Current status: Ongoing (Establishing connectivity and maintenance)
- Location: Arunachal Pradesh, Sikkim, Uttarakhand, Himachal Pradesh, Ladakh
- Approved: 1999

Length of roads
- Phase 1: 3,323 km (approved in 2005)
- Phase 2: 6,700 km (approved in 2020)
- Total length: 10,023 km

Status
- Phase 1: 15% complete by 2012, 20% complete by 2015 46% complete and 95% connectivity established by 2021
- Phase 2: Ongoing

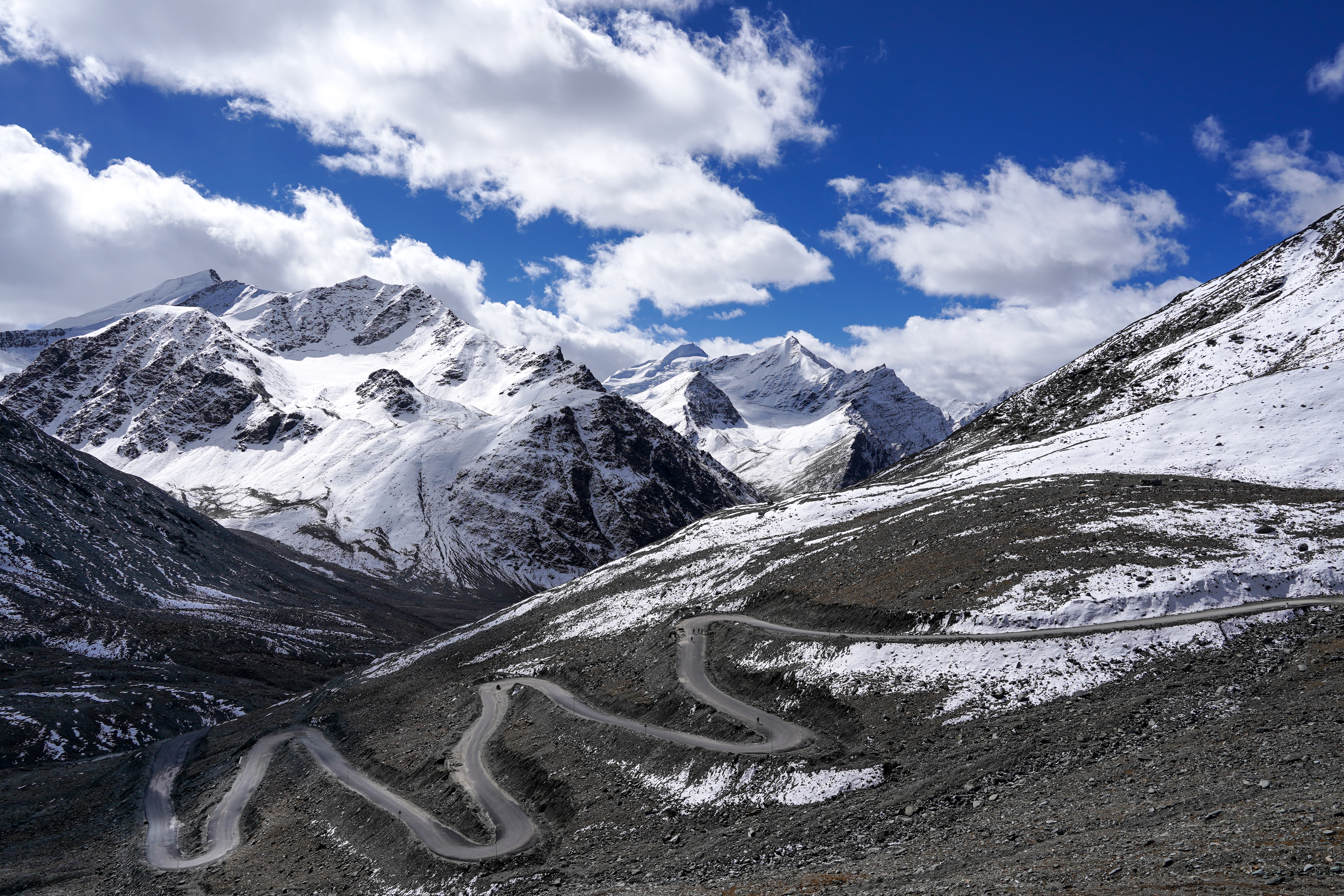
The winding road below Shingo La in Lahaul, Himachal Pradesh, that connects the region with Zanskar in Ladakh

India–China Border Roads (ICBRs, ICB Roads) is a Government of India project for developing infrastructure along the Sino-Indian border by constructing strategic roads, including bridges and tunnels. The ICBR project is largely in response to Chinese infrastructure development along the borderlands with India. Several entities are responsible for constructing ICBR, including Border Roads Organisation (BRO) which handles the bulk of the ICBR road construction work, National Highways Authority of India (NHAI), National Highways and Infrastructure Development Corporation Limited (NHIDCL), Ministry of Development of North Eastern Region (MoDNER), Central Public Works Department (CPWD), public works departments of respective states and others. At least 67 per cent of the road network assigned to BRO falls under ICBR.

Three phases of ICBR roads have been approved entailing 177 roads of over 10,023 km (6,228 mi) total length along the Line of Actual Control (LAC) with China under the "Border Infrastructure and Management Fund" (BIMF) of Ministry of Home Affairs, including 73 roads of 3,323 km (2,065 mi) length under Phase-I and Phase-II approved since 2005 and additional 104 roads of more than 6,700 km (4,200 mi) length under ICBR-III approved in 2020. As of August 2024, the work on Phase-III had commenced, and the Phase-I and Phase-II were complete except some residual work from Phase-II. ICBR covers construction of several roads, 18 feet wide foot tracks and border out posts (BoPs) connecting several LAC Patrol Points (PP) and Border Personnel Meeting (BPM) points. For example, in 2021 India was building 57 roads, 32 helipads, 47 BoPs, 12 staging camps for ITBP and many 18 ft tracks in Arunachal Pradesh under various ICBR phases.

India has set up an inter-departmental "Empowered Committee" (EC) headed by the Ministry of Defence to expedite the issue resolution and timely completion of ICBR infrastructure after the delay in forest/wildlife clearance and land acquisition, rugged terrain, limited working season due to winter and rains, scarcity of construction material, etc. resulted in the missed deadlines in the past. Some of the important already completed projects include the Darbuk-Shayok-Daulat Beg Oldie Road (DS-DBO) and Atal Tunnel under Rohtang Pass; and the under-construction important projects include the Sela Tunnel in Arunachal Pradesh and a road-cum-rail tunnel under the Brahmaputra River in Assam.

== Overview ==
=== Strategic infrastructure requirements ===
In the wake of heightened road and track construction work undertaken by China along India's northern and eastern frontiers, India constituted a China Study Group (CSG) in 1997, to study the requirement of road communication, along the China border for brisk movement of troops in the event of armed conflict. At the end of the study, the CSG identified a network of 73 roads, called the India–China Border Roads (ICBR), to be developed along the Indo-China border. The Cabinet Committee on Security (CCS) in 1999 approved the construction of these roads by the Border Roads Organisation (BRO) under the Ministry of Defence. The project was to be completed by 2006 but the deadline was then extended to 2012. The Standing Committee on Defence, a body for legislative oversight, appraised strategic road connectivity in 2018. With regard to the slow pace of construction of border roads, the Border Roads Organisation stated to the committee:

It would not be incorrect to say that few years back the philosophy of our nation was that we should not make roads as near to the border as possible. That philosophy is telling today very clearly as to why we do not have roads. It is only couple of years back that we suddenly decided a change of philosophy and said no, we must go as far forward as possible. It is going to take time. Unfortunately, the time cannot be compressed. Whatever we can do, it will take time.

— BRO, 50th Report, Standing Committee on Defence (2018–19)

Reasons such as climate, geography, land acquisition and natural disasters also accounted for the delays. In 2013 the United Progressive Alliance (UPA) government took multiple administrative decisions to speed up construction. The 2017 Doklam Standoff further raised the profile of the issue with the Modi government for border infrastructure along the China border. ICBRs are present in Jammu and Kashmir, Ladakh, Himachal Pradesh, Uttarakhand, Sikkim and Arunachal Pradesh.

=== Border Infrastructure Management Authority (BIMA) ===
In May 2022, Indian govt sources announced establishment of the Border Infrastructure Management Authority (BIMA) which is responsible for the integrated development of the border areas including road, rail, water, power, communications infrastructure, and the Vibrant Village Program for improvement of living conditions of natives in these areas to prevent their out-migration as the border villages are considered strategic assets.

=== ICBR project phases ===
==== ICBR-I (Phase-1) and ICBR-II (Phase-2) ====
Phase-1 or ICBR-1 project was conceived in 1999 with a target completion date of 2012 to construct 73 strategic ICBRs of nearly 4000 km length. It was approved in 2005. Of the 73 ICBR in Phase-1, the construction of 61 roads was assigned to BRO and remaining 12 to CPWD. Of the 61 roads assigned to BRO, 12 roads of 1,064.14 km length in Ladakh, 5 roads of 116.99 km length in Himachal Pradesh, 14 roads of 355 km length in Uttarakhand, 3 roads of 61.98 km length in Sikkim, and 27 roads of 1,725.46 km length are in Arunachal Pradesh. ICBR-I is seen as a successor of BRO's Project HIMANK which was initiated in 1985 for the construction of border roads in Ladakh.

As of March 2021, of the 61 ICBR-I and ICBR-II roads assigned to BRO, connectivity on 59 roads of 3,205.16 km length had been achieved. Of these 61 roads where connectivity has been achieved, 42 roads of 1,530.38 km have been black topped.

==== ICBR-III or Phase-3 ====
ICBR-III was approved in 2020–21 fiscal budget, to construct additional 104 roads of more than 6,700 km length. The proposal for the Phase 2 was first conceived in 2013 with the goal of constructing 32 roads along the border, expanded version of which was approved in 2020 with inclusion of additional roads. Amid the India-China skirmishes, the government asked all bodies to speed up the construction of the roads. Additional labour was also sent to these areas to assist in speeding up construction.

=== BIMF funding and progress of construction ===
ICBR infrastructure is funded by the "Border Infrastructure and Management Fund" (BIMF) which provides funding for India's border infrastructures along Bangladesh, Pakistan and China borders.

Spending on ICBR tripled between 2016 and 2020, from ₹4,600 crore (equivalent to ₹54 billion or US$560 million in 2023) to ₹11,800 crore (equivalent to ₹140 billion or US$1.4 billion in 2023). Annual funding was as follows: INR 118 billion in 2020–21, INR 80.50 billion in 2019–20, INR 67 billion in 2018–19, INR 54.50 billion in 2017–18, between INR 33 billion to INR 46 billion annually from 2008 to 2016.

Due to significantly increased annual funding, the ICBR construction picked up pace after 2014:

- Road length construction completed: 4,764 km roads during 2014–20 versus 3,610 km during 2008–14.
- Mountain formation-cutting completed: 470 km during 2017–20 versus 230 km during 2008–17.
- Surface-clearing completed: 380 km during 2017–20 versus 170 km roads during 2008–17.
- Bridges completed: 14,450 metres length during 2014–20 versus 7,270 metres during 2008–14.
- Road tunnels completed: 6 tunnels during 2014–20 including Atal Tunnel at Rohtang Pass in the Himachal Pradesh versus 1 tunnel during 2008–14.

Funds were also diverted from "General Staff (GS) roads" (Note: "GS roads ensure inter-valley and inter-sector movement along the LAC") to ICBRs.

=== Types of ICBRs ===
Of the 73 ICBR of 3812 km, 61 of 3323.57 km were assigned to BRO, which have been subdivided based on their usage type. China Study Group had identified roads vital for defending the whole LAC at national level. Ministry of Defence had identified sub-national level inter-state and regional roads vital for larger military logistics, which were assigned to CPWD and state PWDs. ITBP which mans the forward staging areas and frontier posts on the LAC had identified strategic roads to connect the individual posts to the main trunk and arterial roads. Other roads include connecting inter state and state level. The work structure for the ICBRs is divided among different agencies including the National Buildings Construction Corporation (NBCC), Central Public Works Department (CPWD), National Projects Construction Corporation (NPCC) and state public works departments.

== List of ICB Roads ==
=== Phase 1 ===
Phase-I consists of 3812 km roads.

==== Key ====
- Maplink: Interactive map with road.
- OSM ID: Provides a link to road on OpenStreetMap (OSM) in the form of a relation.
- Status: Status does not represent current state of the road.
- Length: Present / planned
- Comments and citation: Further information about the road including bridges and tunnels.

==== Arunachal Pradesh ====
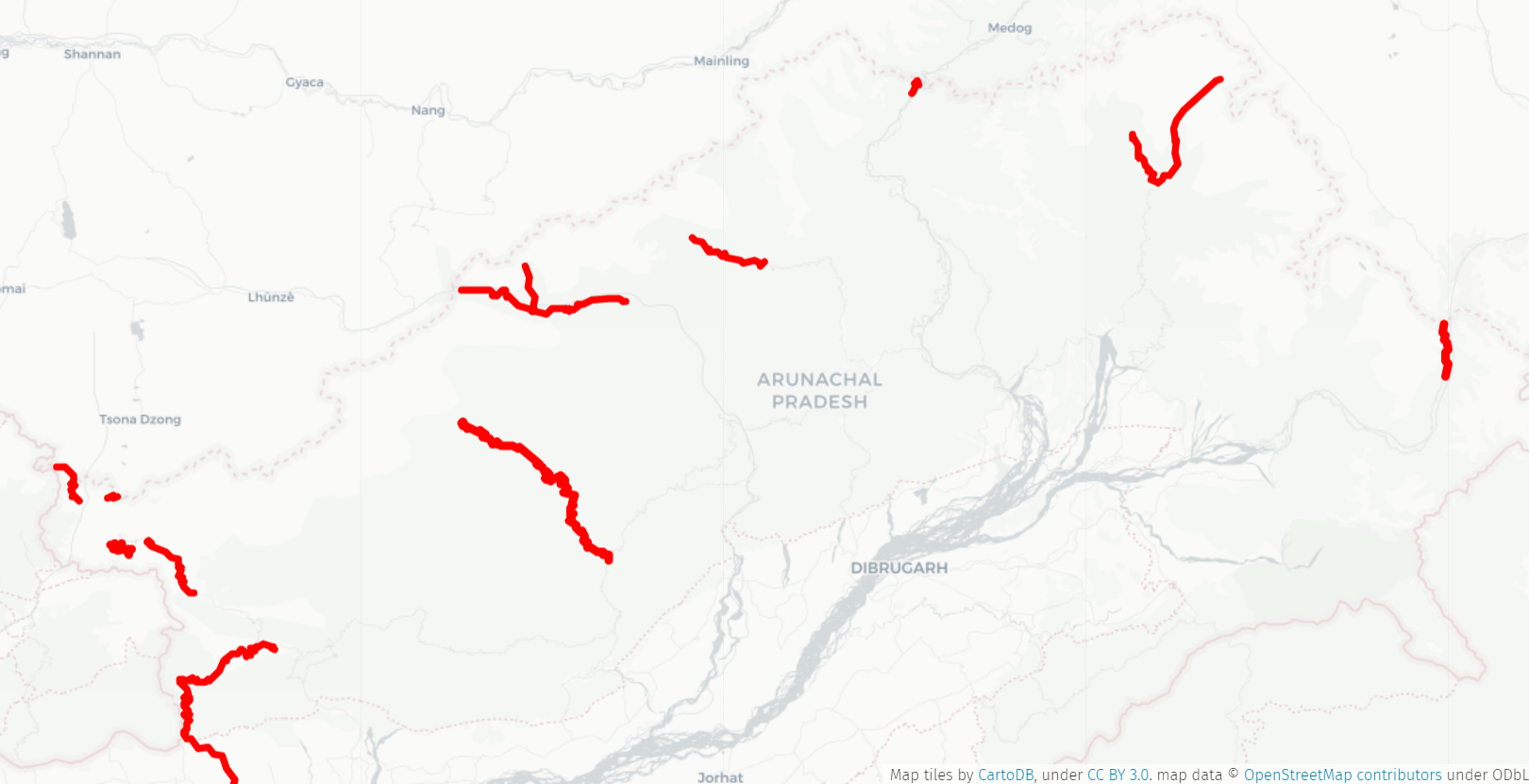
ICB Roads in Arunachal Pradesh

In Arunachal Pradesh the ICBR project, in coordination with other government programmes, has connected a number of border outposts and frontier areas to the national highway network such as Kharsang La, Taksing, Lamang, Gelling, Kibithu and Dichu. Major road projects in Arunachal Pradesh include the 'Sela Pass project' which consists of the under construction Sela Tunnel.

Representative list of ICB roads in Arunachal Pradesh
Route of road Maplink/OSM ID	Interactive Map	District	Length	Status	Comments	Ref
Assam – Arunachal Pradesh
Orang-Kalaktang-Shergaon-Roopa- Tenga (OKSRT) Map 13649310		West Kameng	158 km (98 mi)	Completed in 2016	It provides alternate access to western flank of National Highway 13 which also goes to Tawang. Bridges at Kalaktang, Gajni, Shikari, Sher, Balemu, Bomnag, Haflong.	
Arunachal Pradesh
Tato-Manigong-Tadagade Map 13651872		Shi Yomi	86 km (53 mi)	Partially complete	Tato is 47 km southeast of Mechuka, Manigong is 9 km west of Mechuka, Tadagade is 33 km from Manigong.	
Bona-Gelling Map 13652936		Upper Siang	10 km (6.2 mi)	Complete	Gelling is last Indian post on LAC. Gelling lies northeast of Bona. This is an extension of the Tuting-Bona-Gelling road.	
Tame Chung Chung-Taksing Map 13653063		Upper Subansiri	54 km (34 mi)	Completed in 2017	The road from Nacho goes to Tame Chung Chung (TCC) at Gelensiniak. From there it diverges towards Taksing and Maja (also spelt Maza), both close to the border. Work on TCC-Taksing started in 2000 but was completed in 2017. The road TCC-Bidak was completed in 2018.	
Tame Chung Chung-Maja Map 13660521		Upper Subansiri	48 km (30 mi)	Complete till Bidak	The road from Nacho goes to Tame Chung Chung (TCC) at Gelensiniak. From there it diverges towards Taksing and Maja (also spelt Maza), both close to the border. Work on TCC-Taksing started in 2000 but was completed in 2017. The road TCC-Bidak was completed in 2018.	
Nacho-Tame Chung Chung Map 13660549		Upper Subansiri	78 km (48 mi)	Partially complete	The road from Nacho goes to Tame Chung Chung (TCC) at Gelensiniak. From there it diverges towards Taksing and Maja (also spelt Maza), both close to the border. Work on TCC-Taksing started in 2000 but was completed in 2017. The road TCC-Bidak was completed in 2018.	
Jang-Rama Sapper Map 13651811		Tawang	90 km (56 mi)	Completed in 2016	It provides access to Tawang and forms the northern/upper part of National Highway 13. It was completed in 2016. It is a part of the unfinished Balipara-Charduar-Tawang road. (Jang also spelt as Jung)	
Sangetsar Tso-Kharsang La Map 13664340		Tawang	16 km (9.9 mi)	Complete	It lies very close to and southeast of Bum La Pass, north of Tawang, east of Lumpo and it forms the part of Bum La Road. BRO ensure maintenances. Image of Sangetsar Tso.	
Zemithang-Khinzemane Map 13664456		Tawang	25 km (16 mi)	Complete	The upper portion of the road is close to the Namka Chu river.	
Yarlung-Lamang		Shi Yomi	N/A	N/A	Lamang is last Indian outpost near Mechuka. Yarlung post is en route Lamang.	

==== Uttarakhand ====
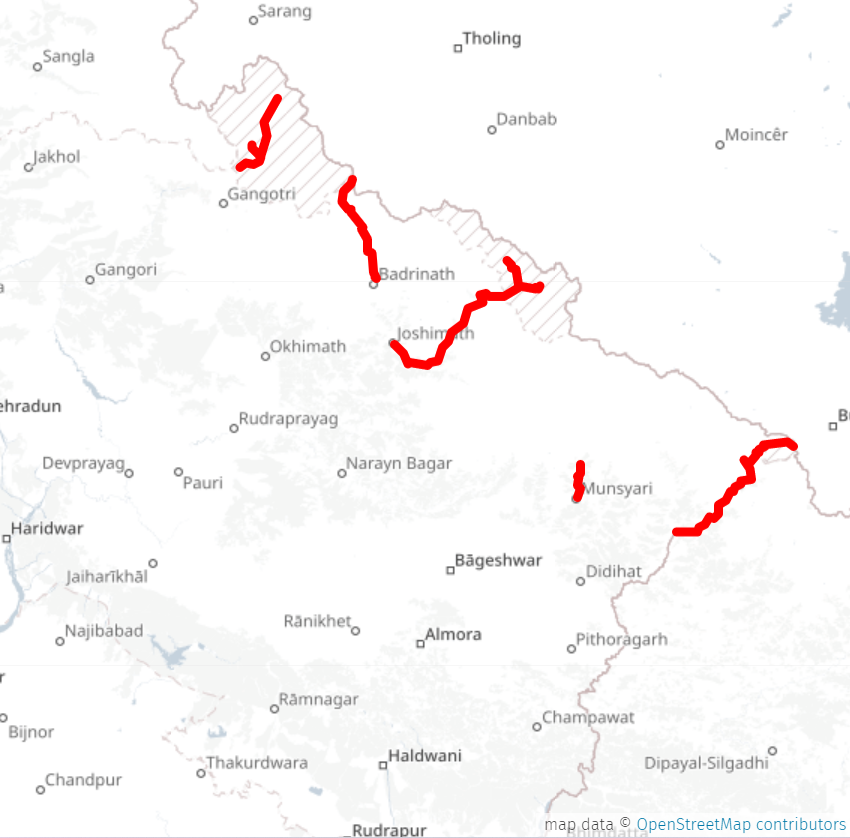
ICB Roads in Uttarakhand

In Uttarakhand, the border most points of Pulam Sumda, Mana Pass, Niti Pass, Lapthal and Rimkhim, and Lipulekh have been connected.

Representative list of ICB roads in Uttarakhand
Route of road Maplink/OSM ID	Interactive Map	District	Length	Status	Comments	Ref
Uttarakhand
Nelong-Naga-Jadhang/Sonam Map 13667660		Uttarkashi	30 km (19 mi)	Partially complete	Nelang-Naga road forks into 2 roads, one each leading to Sonam and Jadhang IBTP border outposts (BoPs). Jadganga River bridge is on this route. The fork toward Sonam continues to Pulam Sumda. This is also known as the Nelgang-Pulam Sumda road.	
Joshimath-Malari-Girthidobla-Sumna-Rimkhim Map 13667486		Chamoli	105 km (65 mi)	Partially complete	Bara Hoti-Lapthal disputed sector is 100 km from Joshimath. Joshimath-Malari road forks to 2 different ITBP posts at Malari, to Sumna-Rimkhim post in the east and another post to the west. Bridges at Dhak, Tamak, Suraithota, Subaigadhera ITBP has 42 BoPs (border outposts) in Bara Hoti sector and Mana Pass area.	
Mana-Mana Pass Map 13667703		Chamoli	48 km (30 mi)	Complete	Image of Mana village. Mana Pass is located on the China–India border.	
Tawaghat-Ghatiabagarh-Lipulekh Map 13667911		Pithoragarh	100 km (62 mi)	Complete	Lipulekh area and the pass, Kalapani territory, Kailash Mansarovar road.	
Munsiyari-Milam Map 13667746		Pithoragarh		Partially complete	Milam is the last village.	

==== Ladakh ====
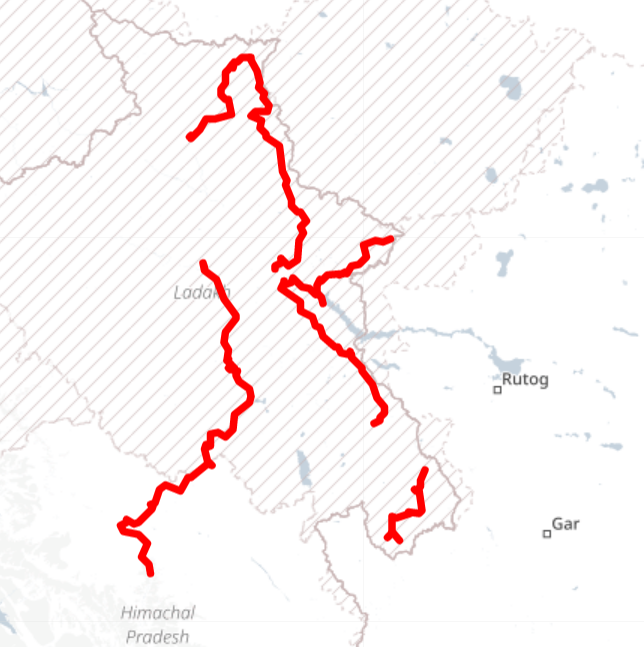
ICB Roads in Ladakh

The forward most localities and border outposts of Daulat Beg Oldie (DBO), Hotspring, Demchok and Zursar have been connected. Roads connectivity has reduced their reliance on air transport.

Representative list of ICB roads in Ladakh
Route of road Maplink/OSM ID	Interactive Map	District	Length	Status	Comments	Ref
Ladakh
Harong-Chushul Map 13671808		Leh	65 km (40 mi)	Complete	Part of the 240 km (150 mi) Spangmik-Tangtse-Harong-Chushul-Tsaga-Loma route on towards Nyoma.	
Phobrang-Marsimik La-Hot Springs Map 13671836		Leh	70 km (43 mi)	Complete	Route from Lukung near Pangong Tso towards Hot Springs close to the LAC.	
Darbuk-Shyok-DBO Map 13671859		Leh	255 km (158 mi)	Complete	Route is partially along the Shyok River and LAC. Also called the DS-DBO road or the Sub-Sector North Road.	
Sasoma-Saser La Map 13671925		Leh	55 km (34 mi)	Partially complete	The road will provide alternate connectivity to DBO in addition to existing DS-DBO road. Image of Sasser Pass.	
Koyul-Photila-Chisumle-Zurasar Map 13671950		Leh	120 km (75 mi)	Complete	Demchok sector. Zurasar is one of the last border posts in the area.	
Himachal Pradesh – Ladakh
Leh-Upshi-Sarchu Map 333878		Leh	250 km (160 mi)	Complete	Part of the 428 km (266 mi) Leh–Manali Highway.	
Nimmu–Padum–Darcha		Leh, Kargil, Lahaul and Spiti	285 km (177 mi)	Partially complete	First all weather road to Ladakh. Third access route to Ladakh. Image represents a section below Zanskar Sumdo in Lahaul.	

==== Sikkim ====
Route of road	Interactive Map	District	Length	Status	Comments	Ref
Sikkim
Gangtok- Chunghang		Northeast Sikkim		Complete		
Tr Jn-Bheem Base-Dokala		India-China-Bhutan Tri-junction	19.72	Complete		

== Related geo-strategic projects ==
Geostrategic initiatives include the Andaman and Nicobar Command and the Quadrilateral Security Dialogue.

=== Vibrant villages Border Area Development Plan ===
Under the 2022–23 budget, India intends to repopulate, upgrade or establish 500 villages near the zero-line border along the LAC from Ladakh to Arunachal Pradesh, while China has already established 628 villages by 2021 at a cost of $6.4 billion with heavily subsidized telecommunication, internet, electricity and utilities, etc. According to this report, out of 172 (incl. 24 3G & 78 4G) out 236 villages in Ladakh had telecom connectivity. For example, 19 border villages in Chushul had no or partial communication infrastructure.

=== Border airport and ALG projects ===
Western Theater Command of China, area under integrated command.

The People's Liberation Army's Western Theater Command is responsible for the defense of China along the whole line of actual control with India. The Indian Armed Forces has divided the LAC into 3 sectors – the western sector across Ladakh and the Chinese-controlled Aksai Chin, the central sector across Himachal Pradesh and Uttrakhand, and the eastern sector across Sikkim and Arunachal Pradesh. Similarly, the Indian Airforce has the Prayagraj-based Central Air Command, Delhi-based Western Air Command, and Shillong-based Eastern Air Command to cover the LAC.

- Ladakh airports and advanced landing grounds (ALGs) at Daulat Beg Oldi, Fukche, Leh, Nyoma, Padum, Thoise and the proposed Parma Valley ALG.
- Himachal Pradesh shares 250 km border with China. Airports include Shimla Airport, Kullu-Manali Airport, and the proposed Rangrik.
- Uttrakhand has 350 km border with Tibet. Airports and ALGs include Chinyalisaur Airport and Pithoragarh Airport ALG.
- Sikkim consists of the Pakyong Airport ALG.
- Arunachal Pradesh has a number of airports and ALGs at Aalo, Mechuka, Pasighat, Tawang Air Force Station, Tuting, Vijoynagar, Walong, Ziro, Daporijo, Arunachal Pradesh and the proposed Alinye (ALG),

=== Border bridge projects ===
- Teesta River road bridge in Sikkim, already completed in 2020 will serve Doklam sector.
- Teesta River railway bridge, under construction in July 2020 and on target for completion by December 2020.
- New bridges on Brahmaputra River in Assam will serve Arunachal Pradesh in Eastern Sector.

=== Border railway projects ===
India's Ministry of Defence (MoD) has identified at least 15 new geostrategic rail lines to be constructed near the China, Pakistan and Nepal borders for troop deployments. In comparison, China has built lines up to Shigatse in Tibet, with plans to connect it to Nepal and further to India. After these lines were proposed by the ministry of defense in 2013, the Government of India approved the initial surveys of all 14 lines in 2014, Some of these as well as other related projects are as follows:

=== Other border road projects ===
- Ladakh-Himachal-Uttrakhand
  - Char Dham Highway, not part of ICBR
  - Pooh–Chumar Road & Harsil-Kharcham Road. Both were announced in September 2020 in addition to the ICBR phase 1, and each will cost between INR20 billion to INR30 billion.
- Sikkim
  - Bagrakote-Gangtok Highway: 250 km-long road originating from NH17 (NH31 as per old numbering) near Bagrakote in the Dooars to Gangtok is being upgraded to national highway standard in July 2020 by the National Highways and Infrastructure Development Corporation Limited (NHIDCL). It passes through Algarah-Lava-Rishyap (in West Bengal on Sikkim border)-Rhenock-Rorathang-Pakyong-Ranipool to Gangtok. In addition to the existing landslide-prone NH10 Sevoke-Gangtok Highway, this will provide alternate access to the state capital Gangtok and beyond to the India-China border.
- Arunachal Pradesh
  - Arunachal Frontier Highway, proposed along the India-China border and is not part of ICBR.
  - Arunachal East-West Corridor, proposed across the foothills of lower upper Arunachal Pradesh, not part of ICBR.
  - Trans-Arunachal Highway, existing operational highway.

=== Border tunnel projects ===
As of sept 2021, India is constructing 31 road tunnels (up from 17 tunnels of 100 km total length planned in 2017), 20 in J&K and 11 in Ladakh, at the combined cost of INR1.4 trillion (short scale) (~US$17.5 billion), this includes tunnels constructed by Ministry of Road Transport and Highways (MoRTH). As of January 2023, of the tunnel projects assigned to BRO, 5 were complete, 9 were under construction ( 6 – Arunachal Pradesh, 4 – Jammu and Kashmir, 1 – Ladakh), 11 were in DPR phase, the rest have been assigned to other entities. BRO keeps 27 mountain passes open and plans to build tunnels under all of those so that traffic remains open throughout the year and the army will save several hundred crores of rupees annually presently spent on airlifting logistics supplies. Of the 13 highest motorable mountain passes in the world, 10 are in India, and out of which 8 are in Ladakh only. Out of 27 mountain passes maintained by BRO, tunnels are being constructed under 11 and the detail project report of tunnel under 9 is being prepared, tunnels will also be built under the remaining 7 mountain passes so that the army can reach the border at a faster pace with year-around all-weather connectivity through all 27 passes. Some of these tunnels have dual road and rail usage, such as the world's longest three tube rail and road tunnel under Brahmaputra. Modi government doubled the BRO's budget of GS Roads (General Staff roads for military) of BRO in 2 years, Rs 25 billion in fy2021-21 to Rs 35 billion in fy2022-23 to Rs 50 billion in 2023–24.

BRO has been constructing tunnels the strategic ICBR roads on Sino-Indian border to provide the year-round all-weather connectivity. Without these tunnels, the road access to high altitude posts on Sino-India border is closed for six months every year due to snowfall and rain, and supplies are through airlift only. These tunnels will reduce the travel time and operational costs, and eliminate the risk of avalanche and landslide. List of tunnels, from west to east along the Indo-Chinese border, is as follows:

Tunnel construction in Himalayan areas have picked up the pace. For example, Uttrakhand has 18 existing tunnels in January 2023 and 66 more tunnels will be built in next 10 years, some of which are already under construction and others are either in DPR or planning phase. In May 2023, India had 1641 ongoing tunneling projects, of which national highways had 144 tunnels of 357 km costing ₹2000 billion including 30 tunnels (45 km) completed, 16 (120 km) under construction to be completed by fy2024-25, 54 (192 km) under the Detailed Project Report (DPR) stage.

Route	Tunnel name	State	Length (km)	Operational (as of dec 2022)	Opening (yyyy (Mmm))	Type (Road / Rail / Dual)	Status/Comment
Jammu–Baramulla rail line tunnels	Pir Panjal Railway Tunnel	Jammu and Kashmir	11.215 km	Y	2013 (Dec)	Rail	3 tunnels in the project.
Jammu–Baramulla rail line tunnels	T13	Jammu and Kashmir	9.8 km	Y	2022 (Dec)	Rail	
Jammu–Baramulla rail line tunnels	T49	Jammu and Kashmir	12.758 km	N	2023 (Dec)	Rail	
NH44 Jammu-Udhampur-Patnitop-Banihal-Srinagar Highway tunnels	Chenani-Nashri Dr. Syama Prasad Mookerjee Tunnel	Jammu and Kashmir	9.028 km	Y	2017 (Apr)	Road	12 tunnels on NH44, two major tunnels are Dr. Syama Prasad Mukherjee Tunnel & Banihal Qazigund Road Tunnel.
NH44 Jammu-Udhampur-Patnitop-Banihal-Srinagar Highway tunnels	Banihal Qazigund Road Tunnel	Jammu and Kashmir	8.45 km	Y	2021 (Dec)	Road	
NH44 Jammu-Udhampur-Patnitop-Banihal-Srinagar Highway tunnels	4-Nandni tunnels	Jammu and Kashmir	1.4 km	Y	2022 (Dec)	Road	Between Jammu-Udhampur.
NH44 Jammu-Udhampur-Patnitop-Banihal-Srinagar Highway tunnels	Sudhmahadev–Dharanga Tunnel	Jammu and Kashmir	8 km	N (under construction)	2025? (?)	Road	Uni-directional twin-tube tunnel near Patnitop costing INR25.98 billion.
NH44 Jammu-Udhampur-Patnitop-Banihal-Srinagar Highway tunnels	Khellani Tunnel	Jammu and Kashmir	2.5 km	N (under construction)	2025? (?)	Road	
NH244 Kishtwar-Qazigund-Anantnag highway	Singhpora-Vailoo tunnel (Sinthan Top Tunnel)	Jammu and Kashmir	10.3 km	N (under construction)	2025? (?)	Road	cost INR32.53 billion. Cost INR46.50 billion. MoRTH approved project since before 2018.
NH501 Chandanwari-Sangam Highway section on Amarnath Cave yatra route.	Sheshnag-Sangam Tunnel (under Mahaguns Top aka Ganesh Top)	Jammu and Kashmir	11 km	N (DPR)	2029	Road	cost INR?. Chandanwari-Sangam Highway, including 11 km long tunnel, is 22 km long greenfield section of the national highway on the South Route (via Pahalgam) of Amarnath yatra which will connect the South (via Pahalgam) and North (via Baltal) yatra routes via the highway tunnel. In January 2023, MoRTH's NHIDCL invited RFP submissions by vendors by 20 Feb 2023 for preparation of DPR (detailed project report) which will take 10 months to prepare, subsequently after 2 months long pre-construction preparation the construction will take 5 years, with the target completion date of 31 March 2029 (total 6 years).
Kathua-Basohli-Bani-Chattergala-Bhaderwah highway	Bhaderwah Tunnel	Jammu and Kashmir	3.5 km	N (DPR)	2027? (?)	Road	2-lane tunnel. Cost INR11.33 billion. MoRTH approved project since before 2018.
Kathua-Basohli-Bani-Chattergala-Bhaderwah highway	Chattergalla Tunnel	Jammu and Kashmir	6.8 km	N (DPR)	2027? (?)	Road	2-lane tunnel. Cost INR8.08 billion. MoRTH approved project since before 2018.
NH144A Jammu-Akhnoor-Poonch highway tunnels (4 tunnels)	Kandi tunnel (Tunghi Morh-Chaura tunnel)	Jammu and Kashmir	? km	N (under construction)	2024 (Aug)	Road	Paved-shoulder highway, Jammu-Akhnoor 4-lanes & Akhnoor-Poonch 2-lanes. All 4 tunnels built by BRO.
NH144A Jammu-Akhnoor-Poonch highway tunnels (4 tunnels)	Sungal Tunnel (Daghun-Sungal tunnel)	Jammu and Kashmir	2.7 km	N (under construction)	2024 (Aug)	Road	2-lane tunnel between Daghun village Kali Dwar temple and Chowki Choura, cost INR7.97 billion for 9.35 section including tunnel.
NH144A Jammu-Akhnoor-Poonch highway tunnels (4 tunnels)	Nowshera tunnel (Rajal-Kallar tunnel)	Jammu and Kashmir	? km	N (under construction)	2024 (Aug)	Road	2-lane.
NH144A Jammu-Akhnoor-Poonch highway tunnels (4 tunnels)	Bhimbar Gali tunnel (Kalai-Bhatadurian tunnel)	Jammu and Kashmir	? km	N (under construction)	2024 (Aug)	Road	Paved-shoulder highway, Jammu-Akhnoor 4-lanes & Akhnoor-Poonch 2-lanes. All 4 tunnels built by BRO.
Poonch-Sophian Mughal Road highway tunnels	Pir ki Gali Tunnel (Chhatapani-Zaznar Tunnel)	Jammu and Kashmir	8 km	N (DPR done)	2025? (?)	Road	Poonch-Shopian 2-lane highway with paved shoulder and 2-lane tunnel will cost INR40 billion. DPR was ready in mid 2022. Tunnel from Chhatapani from the Poonch side to Zaznar from Shopian, "ideally there should be another tunnel that starts from Thanamandi and ends at Buflaiz to make it an all-weather road". Tunnel cost INR2,000, JICA-funded MoRTH approved project since before 2018.
Tangdhar-Kupwara highway tunnel	Sadhna Pass Tunnel	Jammu and Kashmir	? km	N (DPR done)	2025? (?)	Road	2-lane highway with paved shoulder and 2-lane tunnel announced in dec 2021.
Paddar-Atholi-Machail-Zanskar-Kargil highway (Hagshu La tunnel)	Paddar-Zanskar Tunnel (Machail-Zanskar Tunnel)	Jammu and Kashmir	~350 km	N (DPR done)	2025? (?)	Road	2-lane highway with paved shoulder and 2-lane tunnel announced in dec 2021. Traditional foot-track was over the Umasi La, but the new highway will be built along a slightly different alignment with a tunnel under the Hagshu La. Udhampur command HQ-Srinagar-Zoji La-Kargil-Zanskar route is ~1100 km or 25 hours of travel and Udhampur-Pader-Zanskar route will be only ~350 km or 5 hours making it shortest route to serve the Kargil-Dras defence sector. Building the highway across this alpine route will be a challenge. It will connect the Buddhist villages in 3 valleys (Gandhari, Kabban, and Machail) of Pader area of Kishtwar district with Buddhist villages of Zanskar valley in the north which have the similar culture. Kishtwar to Machail Mata road has been completed under PMGSY scheme.
NH1 Srinagar-Kargil-Leh tunnels	Z-Morh Tunnel	Jammu and Kashmir	6.5 km	N (under construction)	2023 (Dec)	Dual	2-lane tunnels, Zojila-La & Z-Morh are 100 km southwest of Kargil.
NH1 Srinagar-Kargil-Leh tunnels	Zoji-la Tunnel	Jammu and Kashmir	14.2 km	N (under construction)	2023 (Dec)	Dual	
NH1 Srinagar-Kargil-Leh tunnels	Nilgrar Tunnel-I	Jammu and Kashmir	0.433 km	N (under construction)	2023 (Dec)	Dual	Twine-tube tunnel part of approach road to Zojila tunnel's west portal.
NH1 Srinagar-Kargil-Leh tunnels	Nilgrar Tunnel-II	Jammu and Kashmir	1.95 km	N (under construction)	2023 (Dec)	Dual	Twine-tube tunnel part of approach road to Zojila tunnel's west portal.
NH1 Srinagar-Kargil-Leh tunnels	Namika La	Ladakh	? km	N (DPR)	2027? (?)	?	
NH1 Srinagar-Kargil-Leh tunnels	Fotu La	Ladakh	? km	N (DPR)	2027? (?)	?	
Kargil-Batalik-Dah-Khalatse route tunnel	Hamboting La	Ladakh	? km	N (DPR)	2027? (?)	Road	31 km east of Kargil between Kargil & Batalik, provides an alternate to NH1 Kargil-Leh.
Leh-Khalsar-Siachen route	Khardung La	Ladakh	5.5 km	N (DPR)	2027? (?)	Road	2-lane tunnel on Khardung La going north from Leh town to Siachen & Nubra valley.
Sasoma–Saser La Road-DBO Tunnel (SSSG-DBO tunnel, Saser La – Saser Brangsa Tunnel)	Depsang Plains	Ladakh	? km	N (DPR)	2027? (?)	Road	On Sasoma–Sasser La-Saser Brangsa-Gapsam-Daulat Beg Oldi Road (SSSG-DBO Road), also Sasoma-Sasser La Road between Nubra Valley and Daulat Beg Oldi (DBO) in Depsang Plains including a tunnel between Saser La 17,800 feet (5,400 m) to Saser Brangsa, wildlife approval for which was already granted in April 2022. As of January 2023, Sasoma (near Siachen Base Camp) in south to Saser La in north route is under-construction – which is reachable on Saser La side from Murgo in northeast by a motorable road, Saser La to Saser Brangsa in northwest is a 30 km foot track under which a highway tunnel will be built, Saser Brangsa-Gapsam-Daulat Beg Oldi section in northwest is already motorable. SSSG-DBO Road connects to Darbuk–Shyok–DBO Road (DS-DBO Road) at two places: at Daulat Beg Oldi in northwest and also via the Saser La to Murgo (on DS-DBO Road) spur in northeast.
Darbuk–Shyok–DBO Road tunnel (DS-DBO tunnel)	Depsang Plains	Ladakh	? km	N (DPR)	2027? (?)	Road	2-lane tunnel.
Gogra-Marsimik La-Pangong Tso-Chushul-Mahe-Karzok-Tso Moriri-Kiato-Kaza-Dhar Larang-Tiuni-Paonta Sahib-Behat-Saharanpur-Delhi Highway	Several tunnels e.g. Marsimik La, Dhar Larang, Chheyuda Dhar, etc.	Ladakh, Himachal, Uttar Pradesh	? km	N (Planning)	2029?	Road	Karzok-Kiato has been proposed and the rest of the road is yet to be formally proposed. From Gogra & Hot Springs the route will turn west to end at intersection with Darbuk–Shyok–DBO Road (DSDBO Road). Between Chusul & Marsimik La it will have tunnel under hill ranges immediately north (Marsimik) & south (Chushul & Changthang Nature Reserve) of Pangong Tso with a bridge over the Pangong Tso & tourist ropeway to peak of finger 4.
Hemis-Tangste-Durbuk-Pangong Tso route	Ke La	Ladakh	? km	N (DPR)	2027? (?)	Road	2-lane tunnel.
NH3 Leh-Manali Highway	Lungalacha La tunnel	Ladakh	14.5 km	N (Tender)	2027? (?)	Road (or Dual?)	Cost for Lachung La tunnel INR67.47 billion.
NH3 Leh-Manali Highway	Bara-lacha la	Ladakh	?	N (Tender)	2027? (?)	Road (or Dual?)	
NH3 Leh-Manali Highway	Tanglang La	Ladakh	7.5 km	N (Tender)	2027? (?)	Road (or Dual?)	Cost for Tanglang La tunnel INR34.90 billion.
NH3 Leh-Manali Highway	Rohtang Tunnel	Himachal Pradesh	9.02 km	Y	2020 (Jul)	Dual	
NH505 Manali-Kaza-Kaurik	Kunzum Pass Tunnel (west of Kaza, between Manali-Kaza)	Himachal Pradesh	? km	N (planned)	? (?)	Road	NH505 connects Kaza to Manali in the southwest, and via Sumdo to the Sino-Indian border in the east and the Kinnaur district in the southeast. The Kaza-Tabo-Shimla route is open whole year, but the Manali-Kaza route is closed for 5–7 months every year due to the closure of the Kunzum Pass (15,000 ft) by snows. NH505 is the arterial highway through Spiti, and has been vital for this region's development. NHAI is planning to construct a tunnel under the Kunzum Pass to provide all-weather connectivity between Manali and Spiti valley.
Nimmu–Padum–Darcha road	Shingo La Tunnel	Himachal Pradesh	4.25 km	N (under construction)	2027? (?)	Road	Provides an alternate route to NH3 Leh-Manali Highway to reach Leh. Cost INR40.95 billion for 8.8 km tunnel & approach Road.
NH154 Pathankot-Joginder Nagar-Mandi Highway upgrade to 4-lanes	3 new tunnels	Himachal Pradesh	?	Y (being upgraded)	2025? (?)	Road	3 new tunnels between Joginder Nagar-Mandi newcalignment, 3 rail overbridges & 8 bypasses elsewhere on this upgraded route. Kangra-Shimla, Kiratpur-Manali, Shimla-Kalka National highways are also being upgraded to four lanes with several new tunnels on each of these routes.
Harsil-Kharcham Highway	Lamkhaga Pass tunnel	Himachal & Uttrakhand	?	N (DPR)	2027? (?)	Road	Connect Harsil & Kharcham via Lamkhaga Pass tunnel, & connect to Pooh-Chumar-Hanle Highway.
Char Dham Railway	Char Dham rail tunnels	Uttrakhand	?	N (DPR)	2027? (?)	Rail	Char Dham Railway multiple rail tunnels.
Char Dham Highway	Char Dham highway tunnels	Uttrakhand	? km	N (under construction)	2024 (Dec)	Road	Char Dham Highway multiple road tunnels e.g. Chamba tunnel
Char Dham Highway	Chamba tunnel	Uttrakhand	0.440 km	Y	2021 (Jan)	Road	Under the town on Rishikesh-Dharasu road.
Char Dham Highway	Dabarkot twin-tube tunnel	Uttrakhand	2 km	N (DPR)	2026	Road	Under landslide prone area of Dabarkot on Yamunotri Highway. DPR was prepared in late 2022 and construction will take 4 years.
Char Dham Highway	Rudraprayag bypass tunnel	Uttrakhand	0.900 km	N (under construction)	Road	2024	On Badrinath route, cost INR2 billion (US$25 million), construction began in November 2022.
Char Dham Highway	Ranipokhri tunnel (Dehradun-Tehri tunnel)	Uttrakhand	27 km	N (DPR)	Road	2026?	Between Dehradun & Tehri on ~35 km long greenfield alignment including 27 to 28 km long tunnel, starts from Ranipokhri in south. Tunnel alignment was being finalized in December 2022.
Char Dham Highway	Budi-Garbyang tunnel on Pithoragarh-Lipulekh Pass Highway (PLPH) or Kailash-Mansarovar Road (KMR).	Uttrakhand	6 km	N (DPR)	Road	2029?	Rs 20 billion 2-lane tunnel, on Kailash-Mansarovar yatra route.
NH310A Chungthang-Tung North Sikkim highway	Theng Tunnel	Sikkim	0.578 km	Y	2018 (Oct)	Road	
NH6 Silchar-Shillong Highway	Sonapur Tunnel	Meghalaya	0.120 km	Y	2008 (Sept)	Road	On NH6 (old NH44) inside Narpuh Sanctuary northwest of Silchar, connects Meghalaya with Assam's Barak Valley in Meghalaya's southeast.
Brahmaputra River	Numaligarh-Gohpur under-river tunnel	Assam	15.6 km	N (DPR)	2029? (?)	Dual	Twin-tubes 22 metres below river connecting NH-52 and Numaligarh on NH-37 will cost Rs 128.07 billion (US$1.7 b).
NH13 Bogibeel (Assam)-Tawang Highway	Nechiphu Pass	Arunachal Pradesh	0.5 km	N (under construction)	2023 (Jan)	Dual	2-lane tunnel halfway between Tawang & Dirang
NH13 Bogibeel (Assam)-Tawang Highway	Sela Tunnels	Arunachal Pradesh	1.790 km & 0.475 km	N (under construction)	2023 (Jan)	Dual	D-shaped single-tube Nechiphu Pass tunnel halfway between Bomdila & Bhalukpong.

=== Sea ports and waterways projects ===
Sagarmala port development project and the National Waterways projects will also enhance geostrategic capabilities along LAC and elsewhere. Waterway projects in Assam on Brahmaputra River and its tributaries are of geostrategic importance for the movement of military assets, these include National Waterway 2 and Subansiri River.

=== Under-river tunnel ===
Gohpur–Numaligarh under-river tunnel, is an under construction tunnel under the Brahmaputra river.

=== Mobile and internet connectivity ===
In June 2020, it was announced that 54 villages in the Ladakh region; including the Demchok is among the 19 in Kargil, 11 in Zanskar and 7 in Nubra Valley; will receive mobile phone connectivity from Jio via the satellite connected towers under the Universal Service Obligation Funding (USOF) programme.

=== Radars ===
- Uttarakhand
  - Doppler radar at Mukteshwar and Surkanda Devi
  - Air defence radars, under construction, at Chamoli, Pithoragarh and Uttarkashi

=== Northeast connectivity projects ===
- North Eastern Railway Connectivity Project
- Northeast Connectivity projects
- Look-East Connectivity projects
- North-South and East-West Corridor
- India-Myanmar-Thailand Friendship Highway
- BCIM Economic Corridor
- Asian Highway Network
- List of bridges on Brahmaputra River

== See also ==
Geostrategic

- India-China border infrastructure
- List of disputed territories of India
- Western Theater Command, China
- East, Central and Western Command LAC, of India
- List of Indian Air Force stations
- List of People's Liberation Army Air Force airbases

Similar rail development

- Future of rail transport in India, rail development
- China–India railway

Similar roads development

- Bharatmala
  - Diamond Quadrilateral, Subsumed in Bharatmala
  - Golden Quadrilateral, completed national road development connectivity older scheme
  - National Highways Development Project, Subsumed in Bharatmala
  - North-South and East-West Corridor, Subsumed in Bharatmala
- Expressways of India

Similar ports and river transport development

- List of national waterways in India
- Sagar Mala project, national water port development connectivity scheme

Similar air transport development

- Indian Human Spaceflight Programme
- UDAN, national airport development connectivity scheme

General

- List of national highways in India
- Transport in India
