= Boham =

Boham is a family name. Notable people with the surname include:

- Noksong Boham (1948–2019), Indian politician
- Sandra Boham, American academic administrator
- Timothy J. Boham (born 1981), American murderer and former gay pornographic film actor
