= Khoina haafi =

Scientific classification
- Kingdom: Animalia
- Phylum: Arthropoda
- Class: Insecta
- Order: Coleoptera
- Suborder: Polyphaga
- Infraorder: Scarabaeiformia
- Family: Scarabaeidae
- Genus: Khoina
- Species: K. haafi

Binomial name
- Khoina haafi Schein, 1959

Synonyms
- Khoina haafi nigerrima Schein, 1959

Species of beetle

Khoina haafi is a species of beetle of the family Scarabaeidae. It is found in South Africa (Western Cape).

== Description ==
Adults reach a length of about 5.5–6.5 mm (0.22–0.26 in). They are black and similar to Khoina bilateralis, but may be distinguished by the darker colour of the elytra and the much coarser punctation of the pronotum and elytra.

== Etymology ==
The species is dedicated to Dr. Haaf of the Frey Museum.
