= Mechuka =

Menchukha Menchukha
- Town
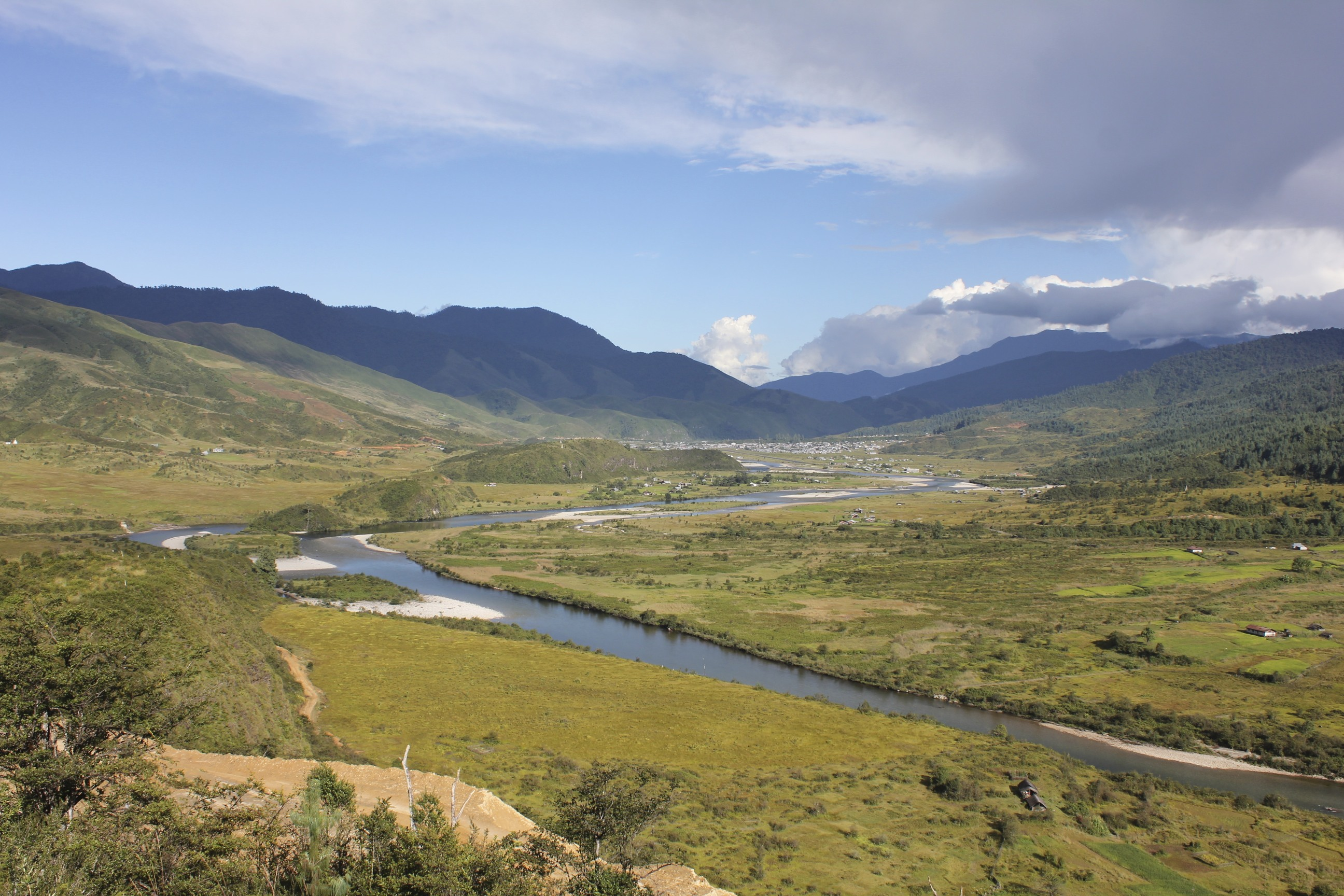
- Arunachal Pradesh, India

- Location in Arunachal Pradesh, India Menchukha (India)
- Coordinates: 28°36′18″N 94°7′41″E
- Country: India
- State: Arunachal Pradesh
- District: Shi-Yomi district
- Elevation: 2,000 m (6,600 ft)

Languages
  - Official: English
- Time zone: UTC+05:30 (IST)
- ISO 3166 code: IN-AR
- Vehicle registration: AR

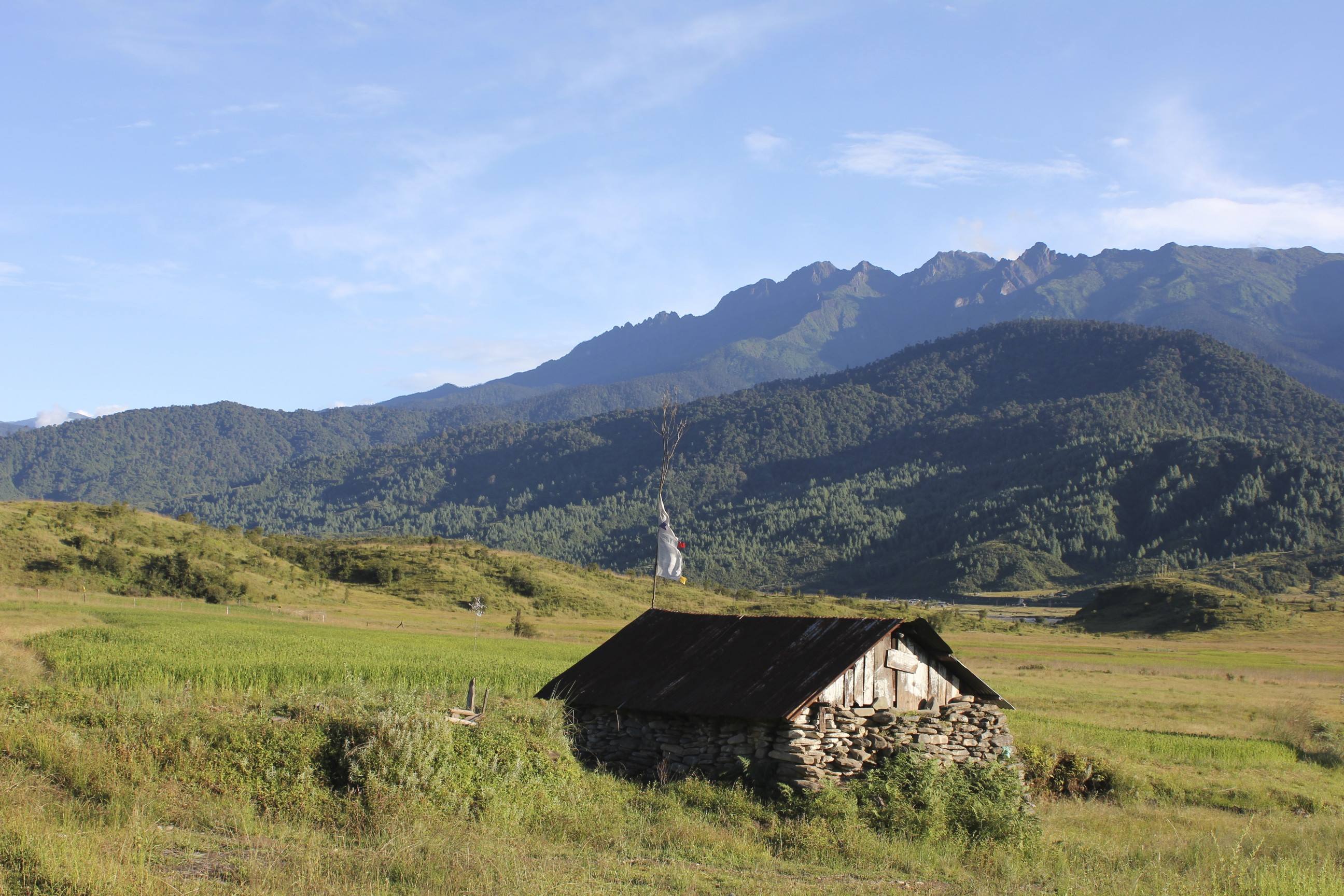
Mechuka landscape

Mechuka or Menchukha is a town, assembly constituency and subdivision, situated 6,000 feet (1,829 m) above sea level in the Menchukha Valley of Yargyap Chu/ Siyom River in Shi Yomi district of Arunachal Pradesh state of India. Before the 1950s, Mechuka valley was known as Pachakshiri.

The Line of Actual Control (McMahon Line) on the India-Tibet border, 29 km north of Menchukha, separates Indian territory and Chinese territory. Mechukha has an ALG airstrip and is also reachable by one of the strategic India-China Border Roads. It is located 47 km northwest of the district head office, Tato, and 187 km north of Aalo.

== Background ==
=== Etymology ===
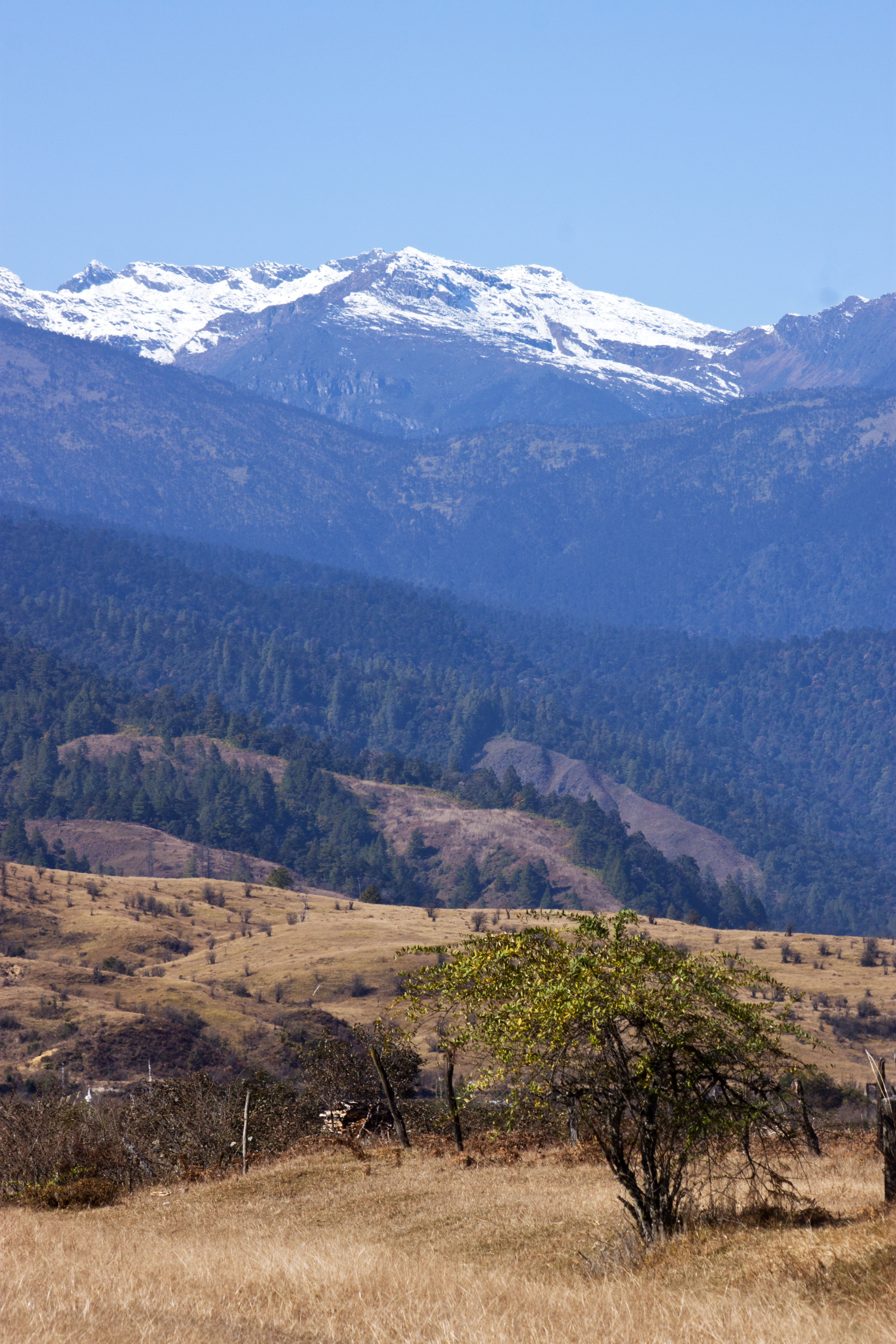
Menchukha Pine Forests.

The name Men-chu-kha means medicinal water of snow where men is medicine, while me refers to fire, chu is water and kha means ice in the local language, thus the difference in meaning of the two different names as per local belief.

=== History ===
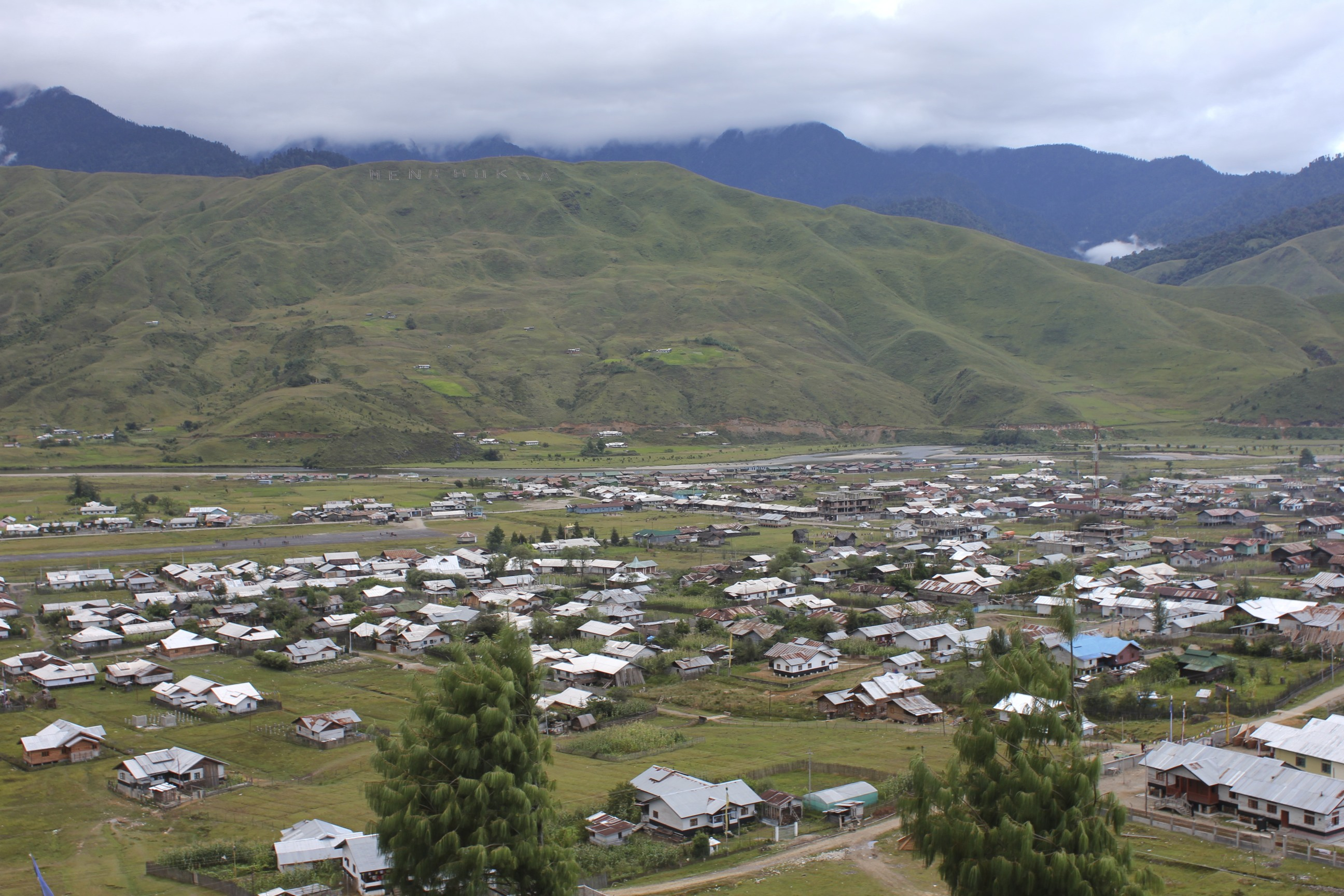
Mechuka village

Menchukha is part of Arunachal Pradesh state of India. Prior to the construction of the modern road, the only access to the village was via an airstrip, used by the Indian Air Force to supply goods to local people. During those times, Membas (adi)ramo people used to trade with Tibet like Mithun for salt and medicines. Horses were their main means of travelling. People often sell horses for money, those time who used to have lots of cattle were regarded as rich.

== Politics ==
Menchukha is an election constituency of Arunachal Pradesh Legislative Assembly. As of June 2024, the MLA elected from Mechuka constituency is Pasang Dorjee Sona.

== Demographics ==
Menchukha/Mechukha Valley is home to the people of the Memba and Adi people. Other local people include the Tagin tribes. The current MLA (August-2016) of Mechuka constituency is Pasang Dorjee Sona.

Religions practised in the valley include Nyingmapa Buddhism, Donyi-Poloism, and Christianity. Mechukha is known for both its religious and historical significance. The 400-year-old Samten Yongcha monastery of Vajrayana Buddhism is a contemporary of the much-revered Tawang Monastery.

The languages spoken in Mechuka are Tshangla, Adi, Tagin, Hindi, and English. There is no evidence of Tshangla still being spoken in Menchukha Valley. Instead, the people speak Memba, which is a Bodish language made up of a mixture of various Bodic varieties (dwags-po, kong-po, brag-gsum mtsho-'khor), East Bodish Tawang Monpa, Tshangla and some Tani loans. Some Memba people still speak Tawang Monpa. In and around the periphery of Mechukha town and especially Mechukha Circle, population is dominated by Memba tribe. The largest tribe of the Shi Yomi district is (Adi) Bokar, mainly residing in the Monigong circle, Memba inhabiting the valleys of Mechukha, limbo and Ramo inhabiting the Tato circle; most of the people speak Adi in the Shi Yomi district after that member and then tagin.

== Transport ==
=== Mechuka Airport ===
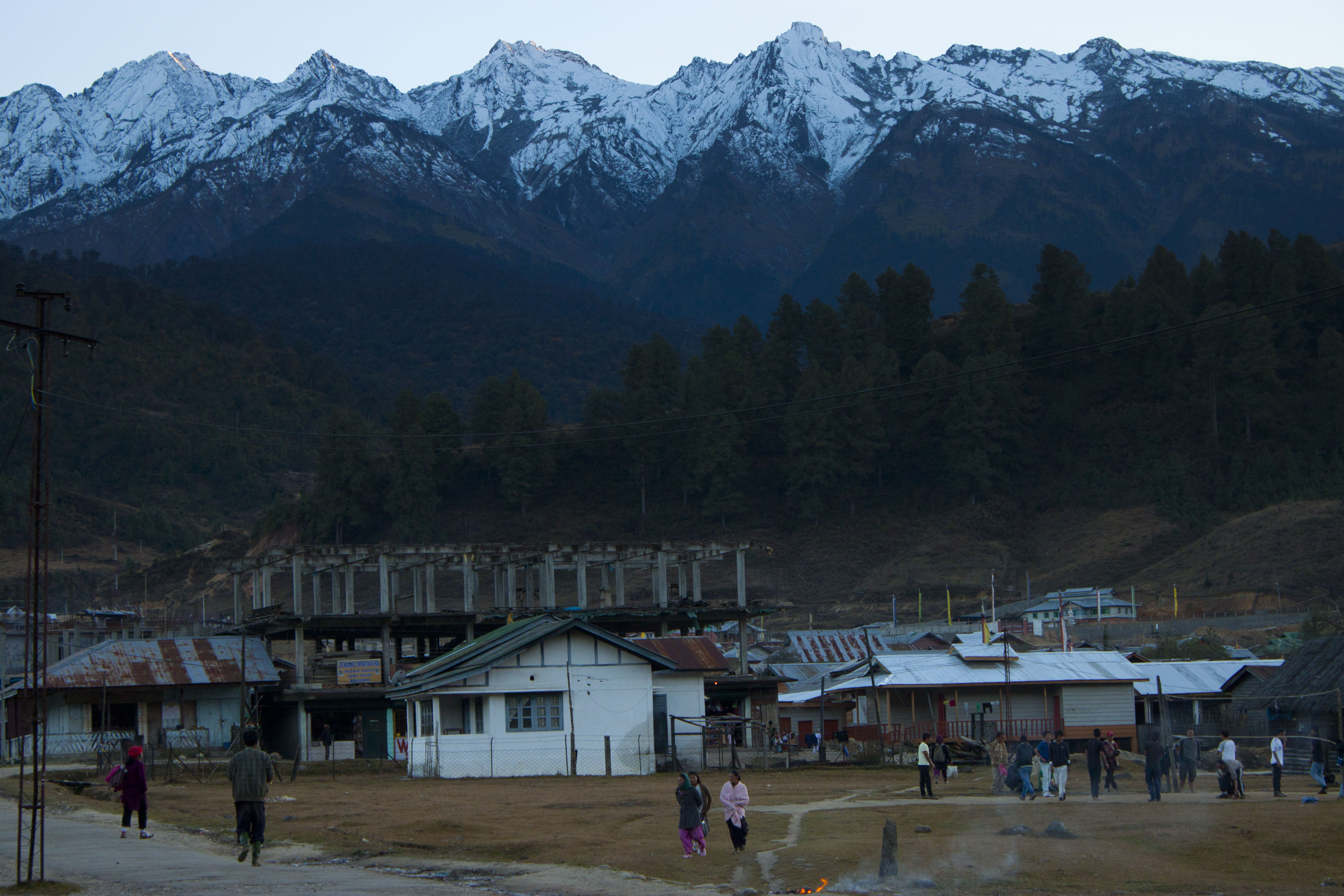
Menchukha town at dusk

The Indian Air Force maintains an airstrip, known as the Advanced Landing Ground (ALG) in Mechukha. The airstrip is used frequently to bring in vital supplies from cities in Assam via Antonov-32 aircraft and helicopters. The runway was renovated, strengthened, upgraded to a concrete runway and extended to 4,700 feet in 2017 by the government. The area has a significant military presence, which also creates some employment opportunities for civilians. There is a twice a week helicopter service under the UDAN scheme on Monday and Saturday. Government of Arunachal Pradesh has invited bids from the private airlines to operate a 9-seater fixed-wing air service which will not be under the UDAN scheme (c. May 2018). On 3 Jun 2019, An Indian Air Force Plane Carrying 13 went missing after taking off From Assam toward this airport. The wreckage of this aircraft was found in Siang circle sometime on 11 June 2019 and has been confirmed to District officials by IAF. The wreckage was spotted by an MI17 helicopter that was on search & rescue mission since last 8 days.

=== Highways ===
Aalo-Tato-Mechukha-Yorlung-Lamang Highway (ATMYL Road), from Aalo (formerly called Along) to Tato, Mechuka, Yorlung, Lamang, and Lola Pass on LAC will be completed by March 2026 (September 2025 update). From Yorlung, the road forks into two, Yorlung-Lamang Road to north to Lamang BOP on LAC and Yorlung-Trijunction Road to northwest to Trijunction BOP on LAC. Aalo-Mechuka section is two-lane highway. Mechukha has become a subdivisional headquarters.

The 2,000-kilometre-long (1,200 mi) proposed Mago-Thingbu to Vijaynagar Arunachal Pradesh Frontier Highway along the McMahon Line, (will intersect with the proposed East-West Industrial Corridor Highway) and will pass through Mechuka.

== Tourism ==
Mechukha is gradually becoming a tourist destination in Arunachal Pradesh due to its scenery, exotic tribes, gentle hills and snow-capped mountains and Siyom River (locally known as Yargyap Chu). The Siyom River, which flows through Mechukha also provides a scenic view in the valley.

One of the main tourist attractions is a 400-year-old Buddhist monastery, which is located at a hilltop in the westernmost part of Mechukha. A number of ancient statues can also be found here. The people of Adi tribe have resided in the Menchukha valley since time immemorial in the periphery of Mechukha valley in the villages of Gapo, Pauk, Padusa, Lipusi, Hiri, Purying, Rapum, Charung, Rego and Kart gumjipang, barang gang, and shorang dhem.

A new giant flying squirrel was discovered and described from the area by the naturalist of North East India Dr. Anwaruddin Choudhury, who named Mechuka's giant flying squirrel Petaurista mechukaensis. The IUCN RedList has classified it as a Data Deficient species.

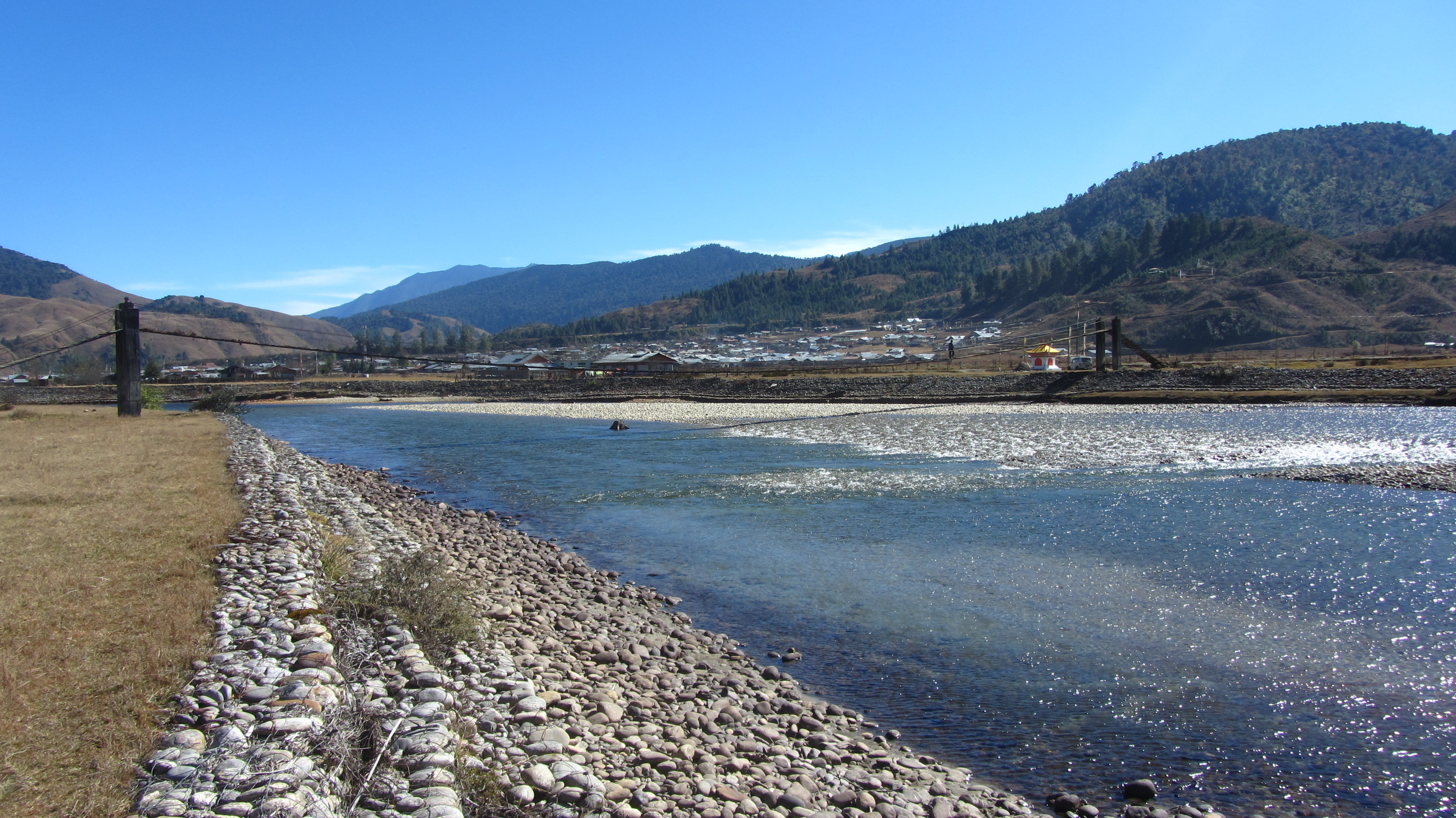
Menchukha landscape with river Siyom at the foreground

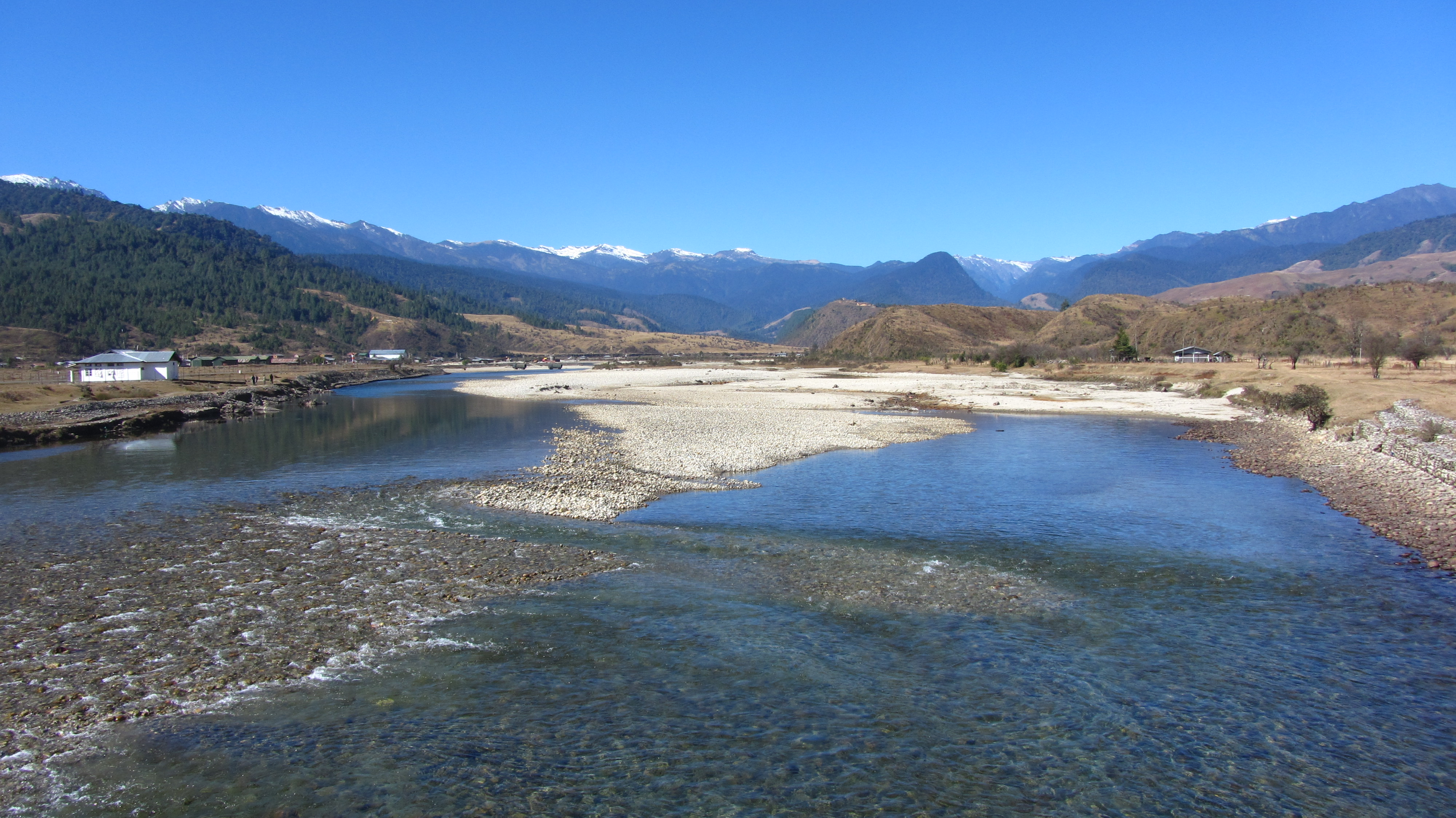
Menchukha landscape, river Siyom at the foreground

== See also ==
- North-East Frontier Agency
- List of people from Arunachal Pradesh
- Religion in Arunachal Pradesh
- Cuisine of Arunachal Pradesh
- List of institutions of higher education in Arunachal Pradesh
