= Lapthal =

Border outpost in Uttarakahand, India

Lapthal Laptel
- Lapthal
- Location within Uttarakhand Location within India
- Coordinates: 30°44′N 80°08′E
- Country: India
- District: Chamoli and Pithoragarh
- State: Uttarakhand
- Elevation: 4,700 m (15,400 ft)
- Time zone: UTC+5:30 (IST)

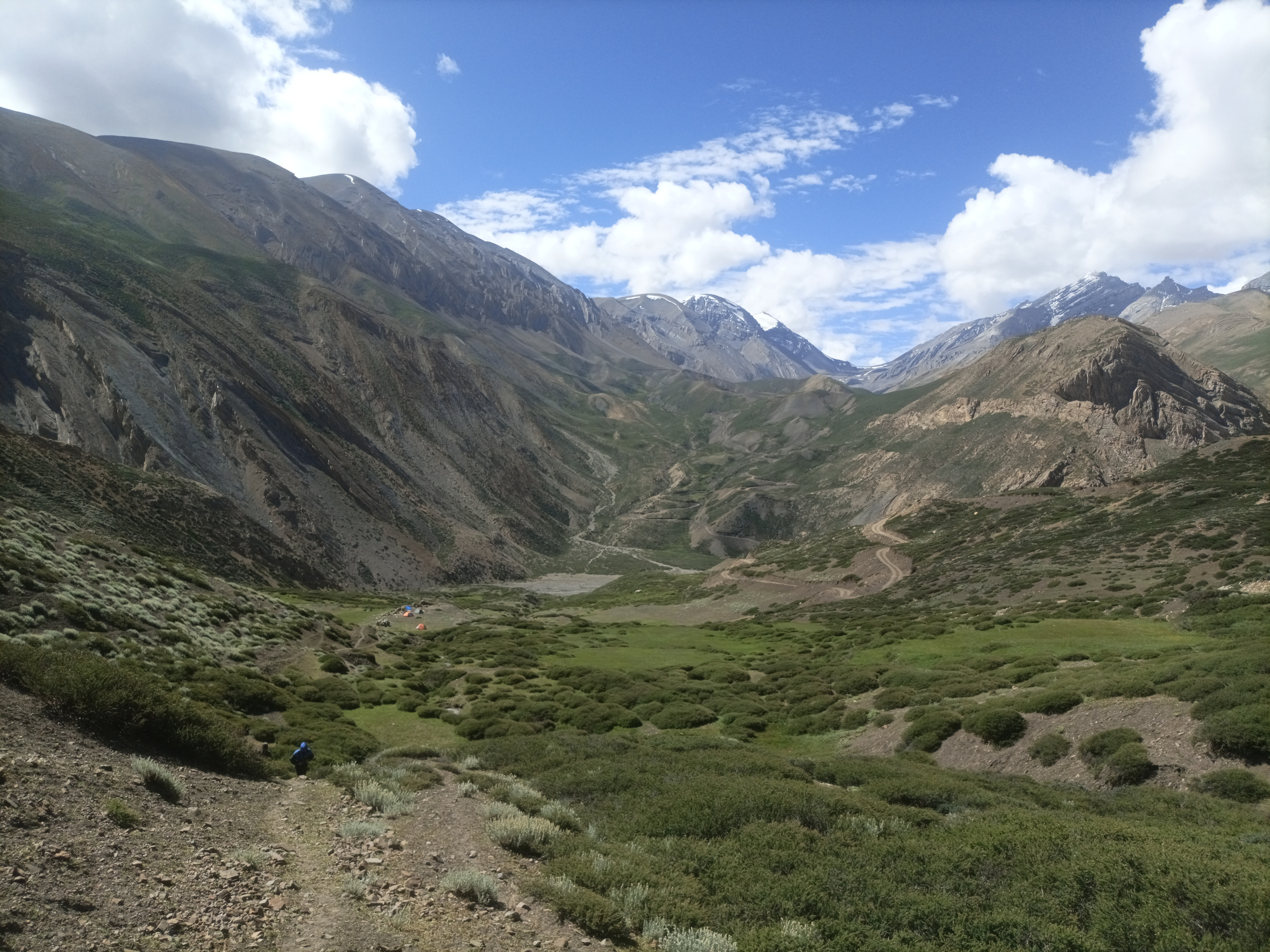
Landscape View of Old Lapthal, also called Loha Lapthal (Altitude 4250 metres above sea level)

Lapthal is located in the Pithoragarh district and Chamoli district of Uttarakahand, India. Lapthal is historically part of India territory and currently controlled by India with some claim on the region by Zanda County, Ngari Prefecture, Tibet, China.

== Origins of Lapthal ==
The Lapthal Region, located in Chamoli District in the north-east of Uttarakhand, Himalayas, holds a geological history tracing back to the ancient Tethys Sea. During the Mesozoic Era, the Tethys Sea was a vast ocean separating the supercontinents of Gondwana and Laurasia. As tectonic movements gradually pushed these landmasses together, the Tethys Sea began to close, giving rise to the Himalayas. Today, the Lapthal Region offers a rare glimpse into this bygone era, with marine fossils and sedimentary rock formations that once lay at the bottom of the Tethys Sea now visible on the surface. These geological remnants provide insights into the Earth's dynamic history and the processes that shaped the current Himalayan landscape.

== Proposed Fossil National Park in Lapthal ==
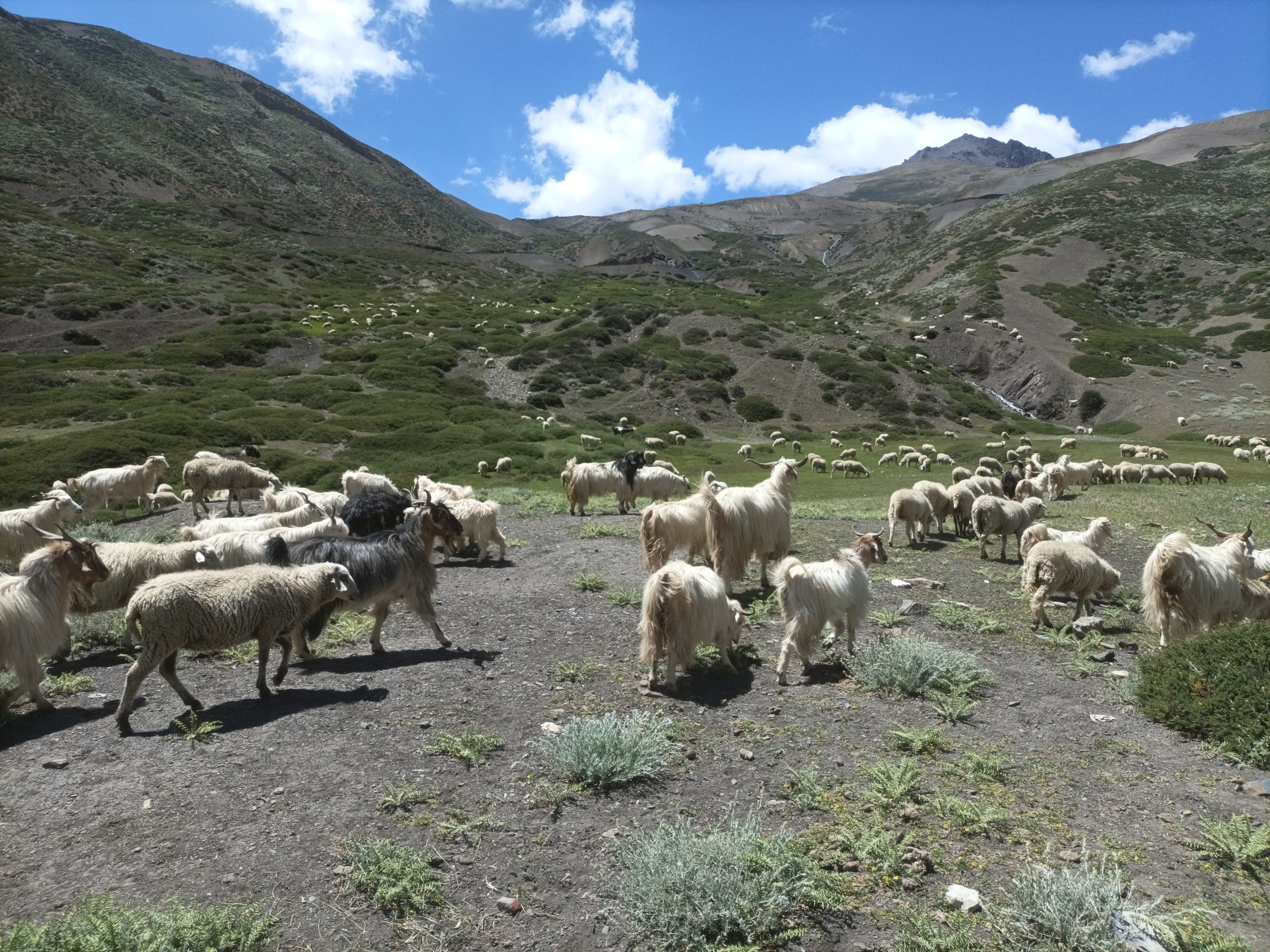
Annually in summer Indian shepherds migrate up to these trans-Himalayan / Tibetan plateau like grasslands with large flocks Sheep and Goat herds

The Pithoragarh Forest Division's management plan for 2011 to 2021 has suggested that the Lapthal region, located near the Indo-Tibetan border, be designated as a Fossil National Park. This area, extending across parts of Pithoragarh and Chamoli districts in Uttarakhand, India, represents the remnants of an ancient seabed that disappeared during the Himalayan formation. The proposed park aims to protect significant fossil deposits and the region's unique flora and fauna while curbing illegal trade and poaching activities. Nanda Devi Biosphere Reserve officials are tasked with preparing a comprehensive proposal and delineating the park's boundaries, which will cover between 500 and 1,000 square kilometers, predominantly at elevations of about 4,500 meters above sea level. The site is rich in marine fossils such as ammonites and belemnites, known locally as 'Shaligram pathar,' which hold cultural and religious significance. The region also supports diverse wildlife, including the snow leopard, musk deer, Tibetan wild ass, woolly hare, and Tibetan wolf. Given its strategic location near the border, the Indo-Tibetan Border Police (ITBP) oversee the area. Presently, access to Lapthal is limited to trekking routes from Sumna in Chamoli or Munsiyari in Pithoragarh, although the Border Roads Organisation (BRO) has plans to construct a new route from Sumna to Lapthal.

== ITBP border out posts ==
Lapthal and Rimkhim border out posts of the Indo-Tibetan Border Police are located in the area. It took the Border Roads Organisation 24 years to connect Rimkhim to the nearest habitat of Malari, 41 kilometers away.
