= Theng Tunnel =

Longest road tunnel in the state of Sikkim

Theng tunnel
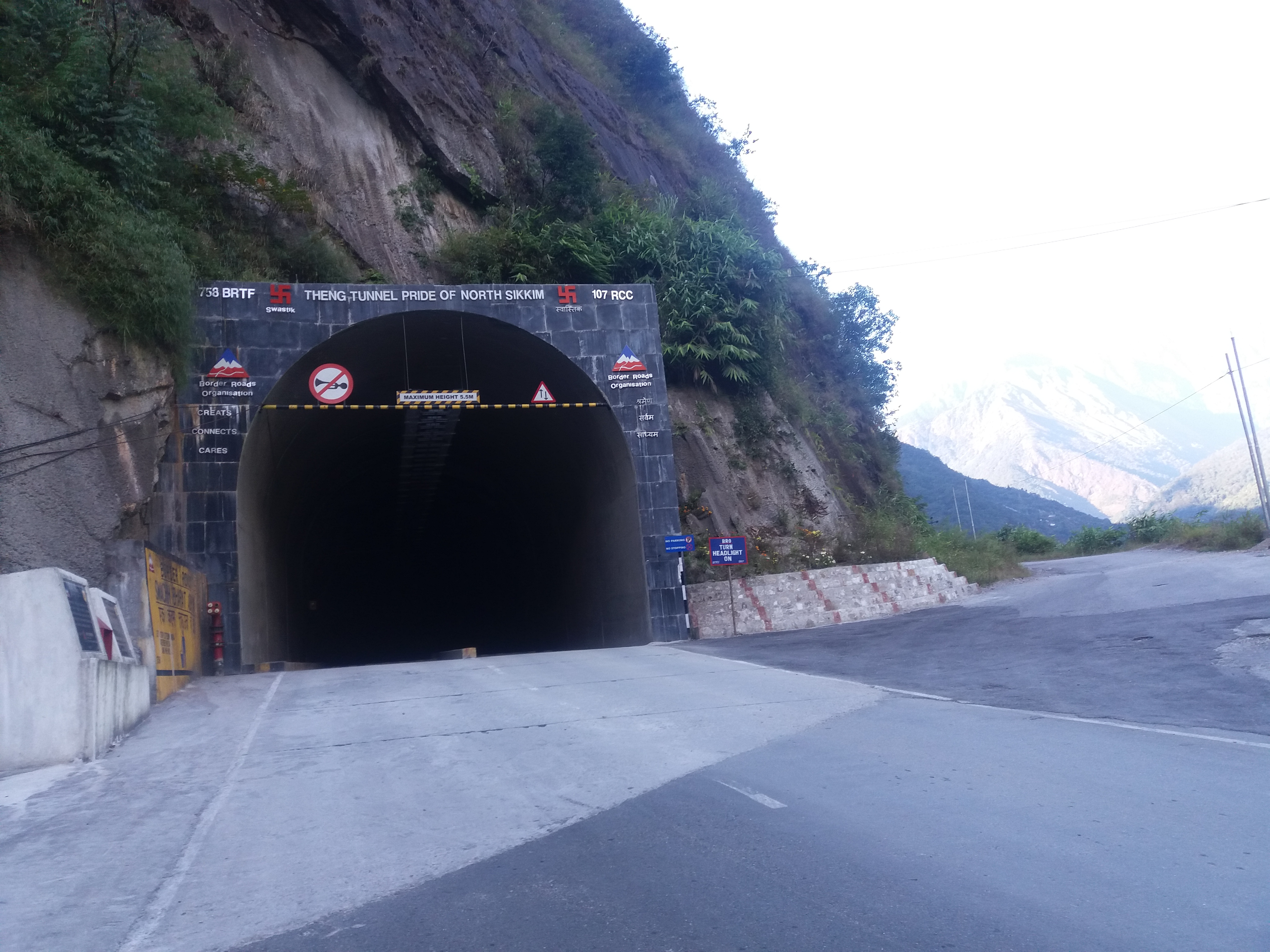
- Interactive map of Theng tunnel

Overview
- Location: Mangan District, Sikkim, India
- Coordinates: 27.55691°N 88.65389°E
- Status: Active

Operation
- Opened: 7 June 2018

Technical
- Length: 578 metres (1,896 ft)
- Tunnel clearance: 5.5 metres (18 ft)

Theng Tunnel is a road tunnel on the Chungthang-Mangan (Gangtok-Chungthang) highway in North Sikkim. The 578 meters long tunnel is the longest tunnel in the state of Sikkim.

It is constructed by Border Road Organisation as part of Project Swastik on the Sino-Indian border. The construction was carried out by AIREF Engineers and was inaugurated on 7 June 2018. It is double-lane tunnel which bypasses a treacherous stretch of road between Sikkim's capital Gangtok and Chungthang, which frequently remains closed due to land slides and shooting stones. The tunnel is illuminated by LED lights, has one safety exit in case of emergencies and has full fire safety feature with fire hydrants and a big tank for storage of water.

== See also ==
- India-China Border Roads
