= Ruksin =

- City
- Sub-Division of East Siang District
- Motto: To lead the darkness into light
- Location in Arunachal Pradesh, India Ruksin (India)
- Coordinates: 27°50′37″N 95°13′24″E
- Country: India
- State: Arunachal Pradesh
- District: East Siang
- Founded: 1960

Government
  - Type: ZPM, MLA, MP
  - ZPM: Tajing Taki (INC)
  - MLA: Tatung Jamoh & Tangor Tapak
  - MP: Ninong Ering & Tapir Gao
- Time zone: UTC−5
- Sub District: 791102
- Website: eastsiang.nic.in

Ruksin is a Sub-Division and Major City located in the East Siang district, Arunachal Pradesh.

== Location ==
Ruksin is located 30 km away from its district headquarters of Pasighat. It is the entrance to the East Siang district from the Assam.

== Transport ==
The proposed 2,000-kilometre-long (1,200 mi) Mago-Thingbu to Vijaynagar Arunachal Pradesh Frontier Highway along the McMahon Line, will intersect with the proposed East-West Industrial Corridor Highway and will pass through this district.

== See also ==
- North-East Frontier Agency
- List of people from Arunachal Pradesh
- Religion in Arunachal Pradesh
- Cuisine of Arunachal Pradesh
- List of institutions of higher education in Arunachal Pradesh
