= Noksong Boham =

Indian politician (c.1948–2019)

Arunachal Pradesh Legislative Assembly
- In office 1978–1980
- Preceded by: Constituency Established
- Succeeded by: Wanghlu Wangshu
- Constituency: Niausa Kanubari
- In office 1984–1990
- Preceded by: Wanghlu Wangshu
- Succeeded by: Constituency Dissolved
- Constituency: Niausa Kanubari
- In office 1990–1999
- Preceded by: Constituency Established
- Succeeded by: Newlai Tingkhatra
- Constituency: Kanubari

Personal details
- Born: c. 1948
- Died: 1 December 2019 (aged 71)

Noksong Boham (c. 1948 – 1 December 2019) was an Indian politician from Arunachal Pradesh. He was a legislator of the Arunachal Pradesh Legislative Assembly and a state minister of Arunachal Pradesh Government.

== Biography ==
Boham was elected as a member of the Arunachal Pradesh Legislative Assembly from Niausa Kanubari in 1978 as a Janata Party candidate. He was elected from this constituency in 1984 as an Indian National Congress candidate. He was elected as a legislator of the Arunachal Pradesh Legislative Assembly from Kanubari in 1990 and 1995 as an Indian National Congress candidate. He also served as the state minister for forest, industries, panchayat, IFCD, telecommunications, economics & statistics of Arunachal Pradesh Government.

Boham died on 1 December 2019 at the age of 71. He was survived by his wife, six daughters and one son.
