= Nandni tunnels =

Tunnel in Jammu and Kashmir

Nandni tunnels are the series of four highway tunnels built under the Nandni Wildlife Sanctuary on NH44 Jammu–Srinagar National Highway in Jammu and Kashmir in India. Built between Jammu and Udhampur cities with a combined length of 1.4 km (T1 – 210 m, T2 – 300 m, T3 – 330 m, & T4 – 540 m), the tunnels have reduced distance and travel time between Jammu and Srinagar by bypassing 6.8 km of rugged mountainous area with 3.6 km of straight bridges and tunnels.

They were built by Afcons Infrastructure, a subsidiary of the Shapoorji Pallonji Group.

== See also ==
- India-China Border Roads & tunnels
- List of rail tunnels in India by length
- Tunnels in North West India
