= Khoina andreaei =

Scientific classification
- Kingdom: Animalia
- Phylum: Arthropoda
- Class: Insecta
- Order: Coleoptera
- Suborder: Polyphaga
- Infraorder: Scarabaeiformia
- Family: Scarabaeidae
- Genus: Khoina
- Species: K. andreaei

Binomial name
- Khoina andreaei Schein, 1959

Species of beetle

Khoina andreaei is a species of beetle of the family Scarabaeidae. It is found in South Africa (Western Cape).

== Description ==
Adults reach a length of about 6 mm (0.24 in). They are black with light brown elytra, reddish-brown fore- and midlegs and black hindlegs. There are yellowish hairs on pronotum and scutellum, as well as on the sutural region of the elytra, which is otherwise covered with short black setae. The pygidial part and abdomen are hairy and are densely covered with yellowish scales.
