= Sandra Boham =

American academic administrator

President of Salish Kootenai College
- In office February 2016 – June 7, 2024
- Preceded by: Robert DePoe III
- Succeeded by: Michael M. Munson (Interim)

Personal details
- Citizenship: Confederated Salish and Kootenai Tribes; United States
- Children: 4
- Education: University of Montana (B.A., Ed.D.); Montana State University (M.Ed.)

Sandra Lee Boham is an American academic administrator who served as the president of Salish Kootenai College (SKC) from 2016 to 2024. An enrolled member of the Confederated Salish and Kootenai Tribes, she has worked in Indian education for several decades, holding positions in public school districts, tribal non-profits, and higher education institutions. Following her retirement from the college presidency, she was appointed chief operating officer of the Native Forward Scholars Fund in 2024.

== Early life and education ==
Boham was raised in St. Ignatius, Montana, and grew up as a military child. She is an enrolled member of the Confederated Salish and Kootenai Tribes of the Flathead Indian Reservation. Her father, Roy Martin, was originally from Kentucky, while her mother, Betty, was from the Flathead Reservation.

Boham graduated from St. Ignatius High School in 1978. She earned a B.A. in sociology from the University of Montana in 1982. She received a M.Ed. in Adult and Higher Education from Montana State University in 1991. In 2014, Boham earned a Ed.D. in Education Leadership from the University of Montana. Her dissertation was titled "The Relationship Between Intergenerational Educational Experiences, School Culture/Climate, and Racial Identity Among American Indian High School Students." John Matt was her faculty supervisor.

== Career ==
Early in her career, Boham taught math, English, and reading at the Women's Correctional Center in Warm Springs, Montana, for one year. From 1984 to 1986, she worked as a basic education instructor at the Kicking Horse Job Corps Center. She first joined the administration of Salish Kootenai College (SKC) in 1986, serving as the registrar and admissions officer until 1989.

In the 1990s, Boham relocated to California, where she worked as an employment development specialist for the Northern California Indian Development Council from 1992 to 2003. Concurrently, from 1993 to 2003, she served as associate faculty in Native American Studies at both Humboldt State University and the College of the Redwoods.

Boham returned to Salish Kootenai College in 2003, serving as the assistant director of Upward Bound GEAR UP until 2004, followed by a role as a financial aid specialist from 2004 to 2006. From 2006 to 2014, she served as the director of Indian Education for Great Falls Public Schools. During her tenure in Great Falls, she helped revive cultural connections for students. By the time she departed, 125 students were singing and five drum groups had been formed.

In 2014, Boham was appointed vice president of academic affairs at Salish Kootenai College. In February 2016, the college's board of directors appointed her president of Salish Kootenai College, succeeding Robert DePoe III. Upon assuming the presidency, Boham outlined priorities that included adding a bachelor's degree in tribal governance, establishing emergency medical technician (EMT) training, offering free Salish language classes to the community, and developing a mentorship agreement with Northrop Grumman.

During her presidency, Boham served as a board member for the American Indian Higher Education Consortium (AIHEC) in 2019. In 2020, the American Indian College Fund named her the Tribal College and University Honoree of the Year. That same year, under her leadership, SKC launched a four-year nursing program. During her tenure, the college achieved the highest retention and graduation rates among all 36 tribal colleges in the nation.

Boham retired as president effective June 7, 2024, having spent a total of 16 years at the college, eight of which were as president. In August 2024, Angelique Albert hired Boham to serve as the chief operating officer of the Native Forward Scholars Fund.

== Personal life ==
Boham married Russell Boham, a member of the Little Shell Chippewa Tribe, in 1990. They met while attending Montana State University. The couple has four children with whom they formed a family drum group, the North Star Singers, to preserve their songs and stories.
