= Khoina plumipes =

Scientific classification
- Kingdom: Animalia
- Phylum: Arthropoda
- Class: Insecta
- Order: Coleoptera
- Suborder: Polyphaga
- Infraorder: Scarabaeiformia
- Family: Scarabaeidae
- Genus: Khoina
- Species: K. plumipes

Binomial name
- Khoina plumipes Péringuey, 1902

Species of beetle

Khoina plumipes is a species of beetle of the family Scarabaeidae. It is found in South Africa (Western Cape).

== Description ==
Adults reach a length of about 8 mm (0.31 in). They are black, with the elytra livid brown. The anterior and posterior margins of the pronotum have a narrow band of orange-yellow scales, and the suture of the elytra has a similar band reaching from the median part to the apex. The propygidium and pygidium are clothed with yellow scales, and the abdomen with squamiform white hairs.
