= Mechuka Advanced Landing Ground =

Mechuka Advanced Landing Ground
- IATA: none; ICAO: VEMK

Summary
- Airport type: Military
- Owner/Operator: Indian Air Force
- Location: Mechuka, Shi Yomi district, Arunachal Pradesh, India
- Elevation AMSL: 2,000 m (6,600 ft)
- Coordinates: 28.60°N 94.12°E

Map
- Location within Arunachal Pradesh Location within India

Runways
Direction	Length		Surface
Direction	ft	m	Surface
10/28	4,383	1,336	Asphalt

Mechuka Advanced Landing Ground is an Indian Air Force airstrip located at Mechuka in Shi Yomi district of Arunachal Pradesh, India. It is an Advance Landing Ground (ALG) of Indian Air Force.

== History ==
In June 2019, An Indian Air Force Plane carrying 13 en route from Jorhat Airport in Assam went missing while en route to the airstrip. The aircraft's wreckage was found in the Siang district after eight days after being spotted by an MI 17 helicopter that was on a search & rescue mission.

== Military usage ==
The area has a significant military presence, which also creates some employment opportunities for civilians. The airstrip is used frequently to bring in vital supplies from Assam via Antonov-32 aircraft and helicopters. The runway was renovated, strengthened, upgraded to a concrete runway and extended to 4,700 feet in 2017 by the government.In July 2018, Indian Air Force made a history by landing the C-17 Globemaster III at Mechuka ALG.It would make the military logistics transportation easier to the border areas in the state of Arunachal Pradesh, India.

== Civil aviation usage ==
There is a twice-weekly helicopter service offered under the UDAN scheme on Monday and Saturday. Government of Arunachal Pradesh has invited bids from the private airlines to operate a 9-searter fixed-wing air service which will not be under the UDAN scheme.

As of December 2022, the new passenger terminal for handling passenger traffic is almost completed, and is expected to begin operations soon with Alliance Air's Dornier 228 passenger aircraft.

== See also ==
Military bases

- List of ALGs
- List of Indian Air Force stations
- India-China military deployment on LAC
- List of disputed India-China areas
- Tianwendian
- Ukdungle

Borders

- Line of Actual Control (LAC)
- Borders of China
- Borders of India

Conflicts

- Sino-Indian conflict
- List of disputed territories of China
- List of disputed territories of India

Other related topics

- India-China Border Roads
- List of extreme points of India
- Defence Institute of High Altitude Research
- Indian Astronomical Observatory
