= Tizit =

- village
- Location in Nagaland, India
- Coordinates: 26°54′11″N 95°4′57″E
- Country: India
- State: Nagaland
- District: Mon

Population (2011)
  - Total: 6,274

Languages
  - Official: English
- Time zone: UTC+5:30 (IST)
- Postal code: 798602

Tizit is a village in Mon district of Nagaland in India.
