= Khoina bilateralis =

Scientific classification
- Kingdom: Animalia
- Phylum: Arthropoda
- Class: Insecta
- Order: Coleoptera
- Suborder: Polyphaga
- Infraorder: Scarabaeiformia
- Family: Scarabaeidae
- Genus: Khoina
- Species: K. bilateralis

Binomial name
- Khoina bilateralis (Thunberg, 1818)

Synonyms
- Trichius bilateralis Thunberg, 1818

Species of beetle

Khoina bilateralis is a species of beetle of the family Scarabaeidae. It is found in South Africa (Eastern Cape, Western Cape).

== Description ==
Adults reach a length of about 6–6.5 mm (0.24–0.26 in). They are black, with the elytra chestnut-brown or fuscous, and piceous-red in the central part of the disk. The head and pronotum are clothed with long greyish and flavescent hairs, and shorter fulvescent or whitish hairs along the anterior and posterior margins. In females, these hairs are replaced by scales.
