= Salish language =

Salish language may refer to:

- Salish–Spokane–Kalispel language (also known as Salish language, Salish-Spokane-Kalispel, Kalispel, or Montana Salish), spoken in eastern Washington, Idaho, and Montana
- Salishan languages, a language family of 23 languages spoken in the Pacific Northwest of North America
  - Coast Salish languages, a primary division of the Salishan family
  - Interior Salish languages, a primary division of the Salishan family
