= Khoina =

Scientific classification
- Kingdom: Animalia
- Phylum: Arthropoda
- Class: Insecta
- Order: Coleoptera
- Suborder: Polyphaga
- Infraorder: Scarabaeiformia
- Family: Scarabaeidae
- Subfamily: Melolonthinae
- Tribe: Hopliini
- Genus: Khoina; Péringuey, 1902

Genus beetles

Khoina is a genus of beetles belonging to the family Scarabaeidae.

== Species ==
- Khoina andreaei Schein, 1959
- Khoina bilateralis (Thunberg, 1818)
- Khoina haafi Schein, 1959
- Khoina plumipes Péringuey, 1902
