= Gogamukh =

Coordinates: 27°26′00″N 94°22′10″E

- Subdistrict / Town
- Location in Assam, India Gogamukh (India)
- Country: India
- State: Assam
- District: Dhemaji
- Subdivision: Dhemaji

Government
  - Type: Panchayati Raj

Population (2011)
  - Total: 98,760

Languages
  - Official: Assamese, Mising
- Time zone: UTC+5:30 (IST)
- PIN: 787034
- Telephone code: 03753
- Vehicle registration: AS-22
- Nearest city: Dhemaji
- Lok Sabha constituency: Lakhimpur
- Vidhan Sabha constituency: Dhemaji

Gogamukh is a sub-district in Dhemaji district in Assam, India, with a population exceeding 100,000. Situated in the northeastern part of Assam, is a location near the Subansiri river.

== NHPC Lower Subansiri Hydroelectric Project ==
Gogamukh hosts the NHPC Lower Subansiri Hydroelectric Project, and is under construction on the Lower Subansiri with a total capacity of 2000MW of power production on its completion.

== The ICAR-Indian Agricultural Research Institute (IARI) ==
The ICAR-Indian Agricultural Research Institute (IARI) at Gogamukh is an agricultural research centre inaugurated on March 4, 2024.

== 2026 Assam–Arunachal border incident ==
On 10 August 2026, a land dispute at Mingmang Badati under the Gogamukh revenue circle led to firing along the Assam–Arunachal Pradesh border that injured several Assam residents. The incident led to protests and a temporary economic blockade by the Takam Mising Porin Kebang (TMPK) and other groups. Officials from both states worked to reduce tensions.

== Connectivity ==
Gogamukh has its own railway station (Gogamukh, station code: GOMR). It is connected to Dhemaji (approximately 26 km away) and serves as a transit point for the region. The nearby Bogibeel Bridge, located about 50–60 km away, provides connectivity to Dibrugarh, including access to air travel facilities.
