= Shi Yomi district =

- District of Arunachal Pradesh
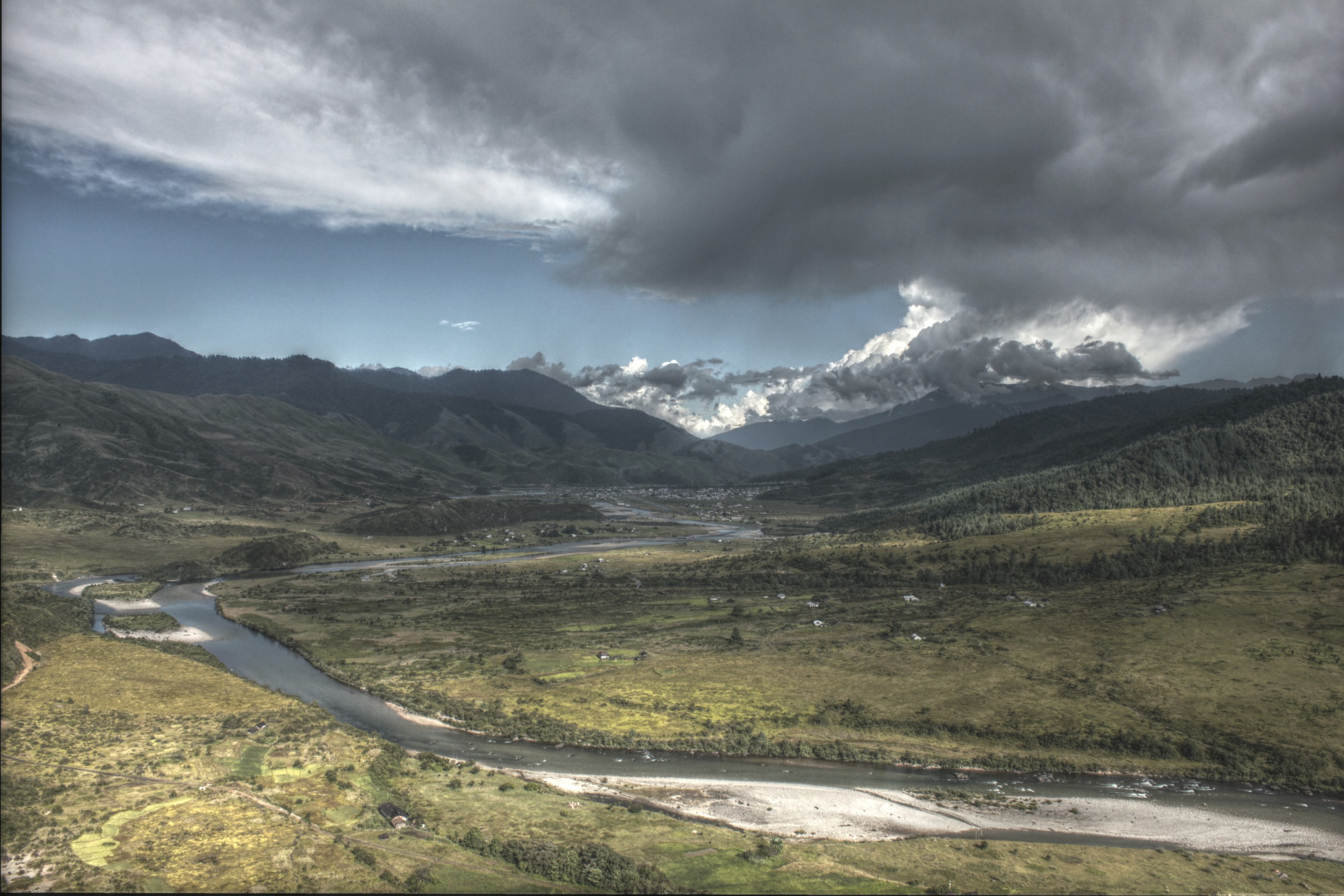
- View of Mechuka from the monastery
- Shi-Yomi district Location in Arunachal Pradesh
- Country: India
- State: Arunachal Pradesh
- Established: 9 December 2018
- Headquarters: Tato

Area
  - Total: 2,875 km^{2} (1,110 sq mi)

Population (2011)
  - Total: 13,310
  - Density: 4.630/km^{2} (11.99/sq mi)
- Time zone: UTC+05:30 (IST)
- Vehicle registration: AR
- Website: https://shiyomi.nic.in/

Shi Yomi district is one of the 28 districts of Arunachal Pradesh state in northeastern India. Shi-Yomi district was created on 9 December 2018 by dividing the West Siang district when northern areas along the Tibet border were made into a newly created Shi-Yomi district and the southern areas remained the part-truncated West Siang district. It has its headquarters at Tato.

== History ==
It was once a part of the West Siang district.

== Location ==
After Mechuka and Monigong, the McMahon line separates Indian territory and Chinese territory.

== Demographics ==
Shi Yomi district is home to the people of Adi (Bokar, Libo, Ramo), Tagin, and Memba tribes. Religions practiced in the valley include Donyi Polo, Tibetan Buddhism, and Christianity. Scheduled Tribes are 12,202 (91.68%) of the population.

At the time of the 2011 census, 71.83% of the population speaks Adi, 17.33% Bhotia, 3.77% Tagin, 2.17% Monpa, and 2.08% Hindi as their first language. The languages spoken in Shi-Yomi district are Adi, Bokar, Libo, Ramo, Tagin, and Memba.

=== Religion ===
Religion in Shi Yomi district (2011)
Religion	Percent
Christianity	37.39%
Donyi-Polo	21.54%
Buddhism	19.61%
Hinduism	16.85%
Sikhism	3.50%
Islam	0.95%
Other or not stated	0.16%

== Administration ==
The district was divided into four administrative units namely Mechuka, Tato, Pidi, and Monigong. Mechuka is part of the Arunachal East Lok Sabha constituency.

== Transport ==
Prior to the Trans-Arunachal Highway construction of the modern road, the only access was via an airstrip, used by the Indian Air Force to supply goods to local people. Another strategic road was constructed by BRO in 2017 in the Kurung Kumey district between Huri (which is already connected to Koloriang) and Sarli after heavy construction equipment was heli-airlifted from Ziro, which will enable Koloriang-Huri-Sarli-Taliha-Daporijo connectivity by facilitating the construction of the remaining Sarli-Taliha section. Once Taliha-Daporijo, Taliha-Nacho, Taliha-Tato, headquarter of Shi Yomi district, were completed, all of which were under construction in February 2021 while facing land acquisition issues, it will provide the strategic frontier connectivity from Seppa-Tamsang Yangfo-Sarili-Koloriang-Sarili-Nacho (and beyond to Daporijo-Taksing)-Tato (and beyond to Mechuka-Gelling and Aalo).

The Indian Air Force maintains an airstrip, known as the Advanced Landing Ground (ALG) in Mechuka. The airstrip is used frequently to bring in vital supplies from cities in Assam via Antonov-32 aircraft and helicopters. The runway was renovated, strengthened, upgraded to a concrete runway, and extended to 4,700 feet in 2017 by the government. The area has a significant military presence, which also creates some employment opportunities for civilians.

There is a twice-a-week helicopter service under the UDAN scheme. Government of Arunachal Pradesh has invited bids from private airlines to operate a 9-seater fixed-wing air service which will not be under the UDAN scheme.

== Tourism ==
Shi Yomi district's Mechuka is gradually becoming a popular tourist destination in Arunachal Pradesh due to its scenic beauty, exotic tribes, gentle hills, snow-capped mountains, and Siom River. The Siyom River, which flows through Mechukha also provides a scenic view of the valley.

The major tourist attraction here is the 400-year-old Samten Yongcha monastery located at Neh Pemashubu on a hilltop 13 km westernmost of Mechukha. Since this was the meditation place for the 6th rebirth of Guru Padmasambhāva of the Mahayana Buddhist sect, it is a pilgrimage place. This monastery is contemporary of the much-revered Tawang Monastery. It is locally also known as the gurudwara. It is reachable by helicopter service from Itanagar via Aalo or a train until the nearest railway station at Murkongselek 330 km away in Assam.

== See also ==
- List of districts of Arunachal Pradesh
