= Tato, Arunachal Pradesh =

Tato
- District Headquarters
- Country: India
- State: Arunachal Pradesh
- District: Shi Yomi

Government
  - Body: Village council

Population
  - District Headquarters: 1,034
  - Urban: 748
  - Rural: 286

Languages
  - Official: Ao and English
- Sex ratio: 953/1000 ♂/♀
- Literacy: 48.64 %

Tato is a census town and district headquarters of the Shi Yomi district in Arunachal Pradesh state of India.

== History ==
In 2018, when Shi Yomi was created as a new district of Arunachal Pradesh, Tato became is headqarter.

== Geography ==
Tato town is 201 km northeast of state capital Itanagar and 140 north of Aalo.

== Transport ==
Aalo-Tato-Mechukha Highway (ATMYL Road), from Aalo (formerly called Along) to Tato, Mechuka, Yorlung, Lamang, and Lola Pass on LAC will be completed by March 2026 (September 2025 update). From Yorlung, the road forks into two, Yorlung-Lamang Road to north to Lamang BOP on LAC and Yorlung-Trijunction Road to northwest to Trijunction BOP on LAC.

== See also ==
- Geography of Arunachal Pradesh
- List of districts of Arunachal Pradesh
