= Kanubari =

Coordinates: 27.016°N 95.199°E

Kanubari is a Tehsil in the Indian state of Arunachal Pradesh. Longding is the name of the district that contains Kanubari sub divisions ADC independent

Kanubari is located 42 km (26 mi) towards East from District headquarters Longding. It is 254 km (158 mi) from State capital Itanagar towards West. It is one of the 58th constituencies of Legislative Assembly of Arunachal Pradesh. Name of current MLA of this constituency is Gabriel D. Wangsu. He has won his 2nd term from BJP ticket against Nokchai Bohham of INC.

== Culture ==
=== People ===
Kanubari is inhabited by Wancho tribe. They celebrate Oriah as main festival of harvest.

== See also ==
- List of constituencies of Arunachal Pradesh Legislative Assembly
- Arunachal Pradesh Legislative Assembly
