= Malari =

- Village
- Location in Uttarakhand, India Malari (India)
- Coordinates: 30°41′N 79°54′E
- Country: India
- State: Uttarakhand
- District: Chamoli district
- Elevation: 3,100 m (10,200 ft)

Population (2001)
  - Total: 649

Languages
  - Official: Hindi, Garhwali
- Time zone: UTC+5:30 (IST)
- PIN: 246443
- Telephone code: 01389
- Vehicle registration: UK 11
- Sex ratio: 1040 ♂/♀
- Website: uk.gov.in

Malari, situated in the Dhauli Ganga valley within the Nanda Devi Biosphere reserve, is a small village near the Tibet border. The area has been designated as a world heritage site. It is located 61 km from Joshimath, the nearest tehsil in the Chamoli district of Uttarakhand.

Special permission from the administration is required to proceed beyond Malari in the Niti Valley. Malari serves as a summer migration place for the villagers, who follow a six-month migration cycle. They reside in the village only during the period of mid-April to mid-September or early October, before migrating to another location for the winter.

The population of Malari is 649 according to the 2001 census, composed of 318 males and 331 females.
