= Dong, Arunachal Pradesh =

Dong
- Village
- Interactive map of Dong
- Location in Arunachal Pradesh, India Dong (India)
- Coordinates: 28°10′12″N 97°2′30″E
- Country: India
- State: Arunachal Pradesh
- District: Anjaw district
- Elevation: 1,240 m (4,070 ft)

Languages
  - Official: English
- Time zone: UTC+05:30 (IST)
- ISO 3166 code: IN-AR
- Vehicle registration: AR

Dong is a small village in the Dong valley of Anjaw district, Arunachal Pradesh, India. It is one of the easternmost villages in India, near the point where India, China, and Myanmar border meet. It is the location of a peak, which tourists climb at 3 am to see the sunrise. It isn't the easternmost point of the country but it is one of the easternmost locations accessible by car.

== Location ==
The first village on the India-China LAC in Arunachal Pradesh is Kaho, which lies just north of Kibithu on the banks of Lohit River, and Kaho is considered the easternmost village of India.

Dong, on the eastern bank of the Lohit River, lies at the junction of the Lohit River and the Sati (or Sai Ti) stream at an elevation of 1,240 metres (4,070 ft). The village is located 7 km from Walong town (on western bank of Lohit river), between Tilam and Namti villages. It can be reached on foot from Walong in a 30-minute climb.

== Demographics ==
According to the 2011 census of India, the village had 15 residents across 4 households. 6 were male and 9 were female. The children attend school in Walong. The local people grow rice and maize, and rear domestic animals, pigs and chickens. The Dong village is primarily a Meyor tribal village in Anjaw district of Arunachal. Along with the Meyors, the other main tribe in the Dong area are the Mishmis which consist of three sub-tribes : Idu Mishmi, Digaru Mishmi and Miju Mishmi. Of these three, the latter two mainly inhabit the Dong area along with the Meyor people.

== Tourism ==
In 1999, it was discovered that Dong experiences the first rays of sunrise in India, thus earning it the nickname, Dong - India's Land of the Rising Sun. Starting from December 2025, the annual Dong Sunrise festival is held every year from 29th December to 2nd January, where tourists can experience adventure activities, cultural encounters, and ecotourism, as well as the Meyor tribe's ethnic cuisine and lifestyle near the tri-junction of India, China and Myanmar.

== Transport ==
The 2,000-kilometre-long (1,200 mi) proposed Mago-Thingbu to Vijaynagar Arunachal Pradesh Frontier Highway along the McMahon Line, will intersect the proposed East-West Industrial Corridor Highway and will pass through this district.

== See also ==
- North-East Frontier Agency
- List of people from Arunachal Pradesh
- Religion in Arunachal Pradesh
- Cuisine of Arunachal Pradesh
- List of institutions of higher education in Arunachal Pradesh
