= List of mountain passes of India =

This is a list of mountain passes of India.

Name	State	Height (ft/m)	Between/ connecting
Auden's Col	Uttarakhand	17,552 ft (5,350 m)	Gangotri III (21,590 ft) and Jogin I (21,210 ft) in Gangotri Group.
Banihal Pass	Jammu and Kashmir	9,291 ft (2,832 m)	Jammu & Kashmir
Bara-lacha-la	Himachal Pradesh	16,400 ft (5,000 m)	On Leh-Manali Highway, near Himachal-Ladakh border.
Bilafond La	Ladakh	17,881 ft (5,450 m)	Siachen Glacier
Bomdila	Arunachal Pradesh	7,273 ft (2,217 m)	Tawang & Assam
Changla Pass	Ladakh	17,585 ft (5,360 m)	Leh & Changthang
Bum La Pass	Arunachal Pradesh	15,200 ft (4,600 m)	Between Arunachal Pradesh and China
Chankan Pass	Arunachal Pradesh	7,874 ft (2,400 m)	Passes in southeastern Arunachal (Anjaw district) between India and Myanmar, from north to south are Dhipu Pass (Dipher Pass) east of Kibithu near India-Tibet-Myanmar tri-point border, Kumjawng Pass east of Krosam, Chankan Pass] east of Vijaynagar, Lekhapani Pass south of Namdapha National Park & east of Miao, Hpungan Pass, and Pangsau Pass south of Nampong on Stillwell Road.
Chanshal Pass	Himachal Pradesh	14,830 ft (4,520 m)	Dodra Kwar and Chirgaon (Rohru) in Shimla district.
Debsa Pass	Himachal Pradesh	17,520 ft (5,340 m)	Kullu and Spiti districts.
Dihang Pass	Arunachal Pradesh	16,965 ft (5,171 m)	Immediate south of Fishtail-II in Dibang Valley district.
Diphu Pass (Dipher Pass)	Arunachal Pradesh	15,049 ft (4,587 m)	Passes in southeastern Arunachal (Anjaw district) between India and Myanmar, from north to south are Dhipu Pass (Dipher Pass) east of Kibithu near India-Tibet-Myanmar tri-point border, Kumjawng Pass east of Krosam, Chankan Pass east of Vijaynagar, Lekhapani Pass south of Namdapha National Park & east of Miao, Hpungan Pass, and Pangsau Pass south of Nampong on Stillwell Road.
Dongkhala	Sikkim	12,000 ft (3,700 m)	Connects to Tibet. Within northeast Sikkim north of originating glacier of Lachung River and 100 km straight-line northwest of disputed Doklam in Bhutan.
Fotu La	Ladakh	13,451 ft (4,100 m)	On Srinagar-Leh highway between Staktse towards Kargil and Lamayuru towards Leh.
Goecha La	Sikkim	16,207 ft (4,940 m)	In Westcentral Sikkim within southern end of Khangchendzonga National Park, near India–Nepal border.
Gyong La	Jammu and Kashmir	18,655 ft (5,686 m)	Between NJ9842 and Bilafond La on AGPL in Siachen Glacier area.
Haldighati Pass	Rajasthan	1,227.03 ft (374.00 m)	Between Kumbhalgarh Fort and Udaipur.
Hpungan Pass	Arunachal Pradesh	10,078 ft (3,072 m)	Passes in southeastern Arunachal (Anjaw district) between India and Myanmar, from north to south are Dhipu Pass (Dipher Pass) east of Kibithu near India-Tibet-Myanmar tri-point border, Kumjawng Pass east of Krosam, Chankan Pass east of Vijaynagar, Lekhapani Pass south of Namdapha National Park & east of Miao, Hpungan Pass, and Pangsau Pass south of Nampong on Stillwell Road.
Imis La	Ladakh	17,355 ft (5,290 m)	Saddle on India-Tibet border between southeast Ladakh to Tibet on tri-junction of Ladakh-Tibet-Himachal. South of Chumar.
Indrahar Pass	Himachal Pradesh	14,473 ft (4,411 m)	near Dharamshala in westcentral Himachal on border between Kangra and Chamba districts.
Sach Pass	Himachal Pradesh	14,500 ft (4,400 m)	near Chamba in Himachal on border between Chamba and Chamba districts.
Jalori Pass	Himachal Pradesh	10,280 ft (3,130 m)	North of Shimla, halfway between Shimla and Manali.
Jelep La	Sikkim	14,300 ft (4,400 m)	On India-China border, halfway between Shillong in India and Doklam in Bhutan.
Kalindi Pass	Uttarakhand	19,521 ft (5,950 m)	Heavily glaciated out-of-the-way off-road pass northeast of Guptakashi and southwest of Kedarnath.
Karakoram Pass (Qara Tagh La)	Ladakh	18,176 ft (5,540 m)	North of Daulat Beg Oldi, connects northcentral Depsang Plains in Ladakh with Xinjiang. In Gilgit Baltistan, passes with Xinjiang from northwest to southeast are Mintaka Pass near India-Xinjiang-Afghanistan tri-junction, Parpik Pass, Khunjerab Pass, then India-held Aghil Pass north of K2. Then in Depsang Plains in Ladakh, passes with Aksai Chin from northwest to southeast are [Karakoram Pass (Qara Tagh La) and Lanak La.
Khardung La	Ladakh	18,380 ft (5,600 m)	Leh & Nubra, just east of Parpik Pass.
Kongka Pass	Ladakh	16,965 ft (5,171 m)	East of Gogra, on India-China LAC in Chang Chenmo Valley adjacent to the disputed Aksai Chin region.
Kumjawng Pass	Arunachal Pradesh	9,609 ft (2,929 m)	Passes in southeastern Arunachal (Anjaw district) between India and Myanmar, from north to south are Dhipu Pass (Dipher Pass) east of Kibithu near India-Tibet-Myanmar tri-point border, Kumjawng Pass east of Krosam, Chankan Pass east of Vijaynagar, Lekhapani Pass south of Namdapha National Park & east of Miao, Hpungan Pass, and Pangsau Pass south of Nampong on Stillwell Road.
Kaldang Kildang La	Ladakh	13,425 ft (4,092 m)	East of Kargil, halfway between Batalik and Mulbekh.
Kunzum Pass	Himachal Pradesh	14,931 ft (4,551 m)	Between Batal & Losar - both west of Kaza, connects Lahaul & Spiti valleys.
Lamkhaga Pass	Himachal Pradesh	17,336 ft (5,284 m)	
Lekhapani Pass	Arunachal Pradesh	13,123 ft (4,000 m)	Passes in southeastern Arunachal (Anjaw district) between India and Myanmar, from north to south are Dhipu Pass (Dipher Pass) east of Kibithu near India-Tibet-Myanmar tri-point border, Kumjawng Pass east of Krosam, Chankan Pass east of Vijaynagar, Lekhapani Pass south of Namdapha National Park & east of Miao, Hpungan Pass, and Pangsau Pass south of Nampong on Stillwell Road.
Lipulekh Pass	Uttarakhand	17,500 ft (5,300 m)	
Lungalacha La	Ladakh	16,600 ft (5,100 m)	
Mana Pass	Uttarakhand	18,192 ft (5,545 m)	
Mangsha Dhura	Uttarakhand		
Marsimik La	Ladakh	18,314 ft (5,582 m)	
Mayodia Pass	Arunachal Pradesh	8,711 ft (2,655 m)	
Muling La	Uttarakhand	18,599 ft (5,669 m)	Connects Uttarakhand to Tibet.
Nama Pass	Uttarakhand	17,100 ft (5,200 m)	(Nanda Devi Biosphere Reserve)
Namika La	Ladakh	12,139 ft (3,700 m)	
Nathu La	Sikkim	14,140 ft (4,310 m)	Sikkim & Tibet
Niti Pass	Uttarakhand		
Palakkad Gap	Kerala	750 ft (230 m)	Kerala & Tamil Nadu
Pangsau Pass	Arunachal Pradesh		Passes in southeastern Arunachal (Anjaw district) between India and Myanmar, from north to south are Dhipu Pass (Dipher Pass) east of Kibithu near India-Tibet-Myanmar tri-point border, Kumjawng Pass east of Krosam, Chankan Pass east of Vijaynagar, Lekhapani Pass south of Namdapha National Park & east of Miao, Hpungan Pass, and [Pangsau Pass south of Nampong on Stillwell Road.
Pensi La	Ladakh		
Pir-Panjal Pass	Jammu and Kashmir		
Rezang La	Ladakh		
Rohtang Pass	Himachal Pradesh	13,051 ft (3,978 m)	Manali & Lahaul
Sasser Pass	Ladakh	17,753 ft (5,411 m)	Nubra & Siachen Glacier
Sela Pass	Arunachal Pradesh	13,700 ft (4,200 m)	Dirang & Tawang
Sengottai	Kerala	690 ft (210 m)	Travancore & Tamil Nadu
Shashi La	Ladakh	13,989 ft (4,264 m)	
Shingo La	Ladakh	5,091 m (16,703 ft)	Darcha in Lahaul to Kargyak and Padum in Zanskar
Shipki La	Himachal Pradesh	12,900 ft (3,900 m)	
Sia La	Ladakh	18,337 ft (5,589 m)	Siachen Glacier
Sin La	Uttarakhand	18,028 ft (5,495 m)	
Spangur Gap	Ladakh		
Tanglang La (Thang La)	Ladakh	17,583 ft (5,359 m)	
Thamarassery	Kerala	1,700 ft (520 m)	Malabar & Mysore
Traill's Pass	Uttarakhand	17,100 ft (5,200 m)	
Umling La	Ladakh	19,300 ft (5,900 m)	
Yonggyap Pass	Arunachal Pradesh		
Zojila Pass	Ladakh	12,400 ft (3,800 m)	Kashmir & Ladakh

== See also ==
- List of mountains in India
- List of mountain passes
- List of Indian states and union territories by highest point
