= Battle of Walong =

Sino Indian war Battle

- Part of Sino-Indian War
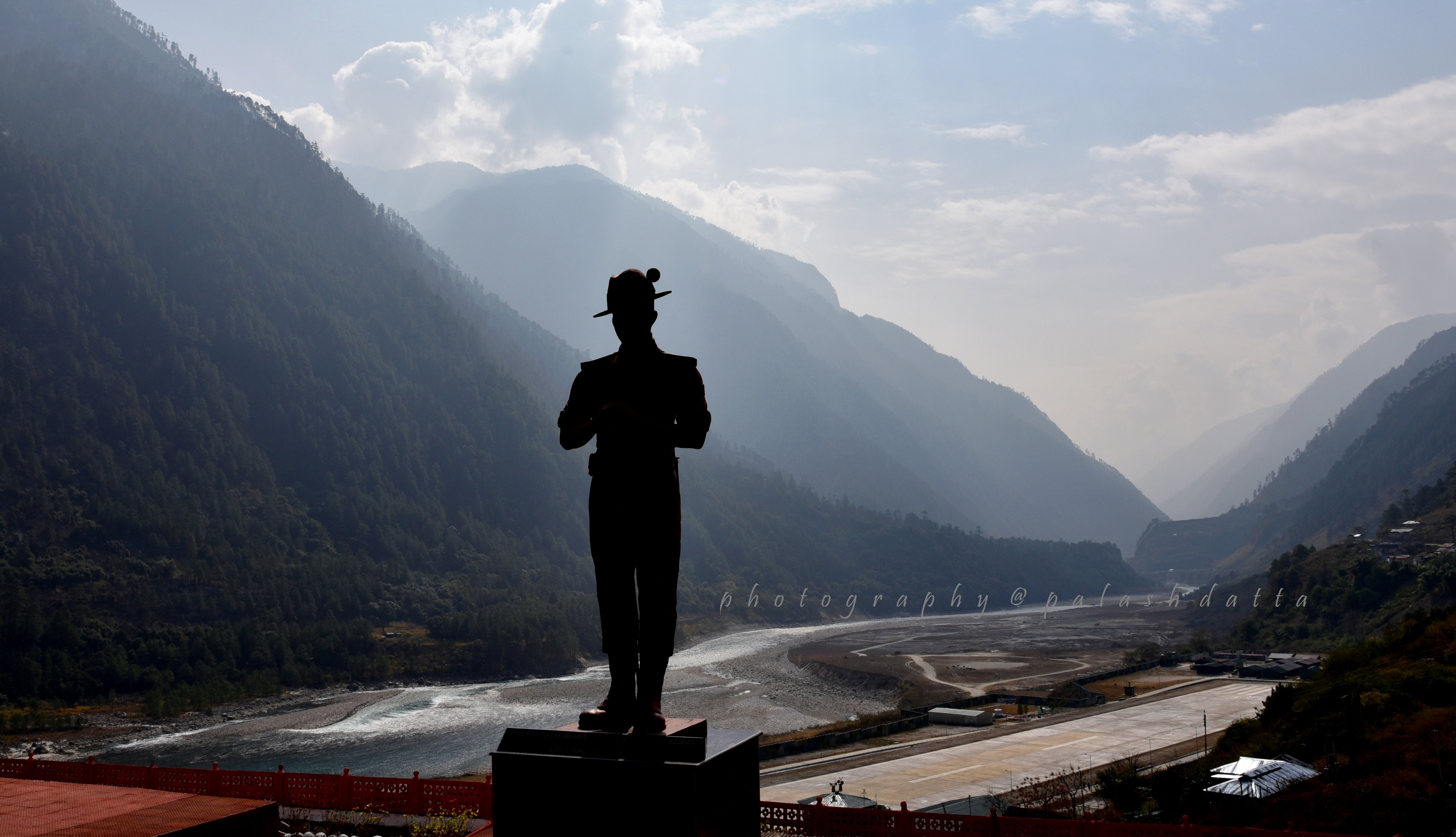
- The war memorial at Walong
Date	21 October (Note: There is a discrepancy between the Chinese and Indian source with regard to the starting date of the battle. The Chinese source considered the battle didn't commence until 130th Infantry Division was able to arrive and reinforce the offensive force on 14 November.) – 16 November 1962
Location	Walong, NEFA, India 28.1288°N 97.0166°E
Result	Chinese victory
Territorial changes	Temporary Chinese occupation of Walong until eventual withdrawal from NEFA in late November 1962

Belligerents
India	China

Commanders and leaders
Brig. N.C. Rawlley	Sr Col. Dong Zhanlin; Col. Qie Jinwu

Units involved
11 Infantry Brigade: 6th Battalion, Kumaon Regiment; 4th Battalion, Sikh Regiment; 3rd Battalion, 3rd Gorkha Regiment; 4th Battalion, Dogra Regiment; Assam Rifles	Initial Phase: Chamdo Military sub-District: 153rd Infantry Regiment (Note: The regiment was a garrison formation instead of a maneuver one, therefore the soldiers contain many fresh recruits and are relatively inexperienced in combat, the actual fighting strength was equivalent to a "reinforced battalion", commanded by Commanding Officer of the 1st Battalion, Major Liu Dongshan); 1 X 120mm mortar battery; 1 X 82mm mortar battery; Reinforcements: (Note: arrived after 8 November, 153rd IR was placed under 130th ID command after the date); 130th Infantry Division: 388th, 389th, 390th Infantry Regiments; Composite Artillery Battalion; 1 X anti-air gun battery

Strength
2,191 soldiers	~2,700 soldiers (Initial phase); ~10,000 soldiers (From 8 November 1962)

Casualties and losses
Indian source: 364 dead 345 captured 278 wounded Chinese source: 750 dead 502 captured	198 dead 554 wounded
- Location within Arunachal Pradesh Battle of Walong (India)

The Battle of Walong took place during the Sino-Indian War of 1962. It took place near the town of Walong in the eastern sector of the conflict, in the present-day Arunachal Pradesh region of India. Indian forces, despite being outnumbered and under equipped, resisted the Chinese advance for nearly a month.

== Background ==
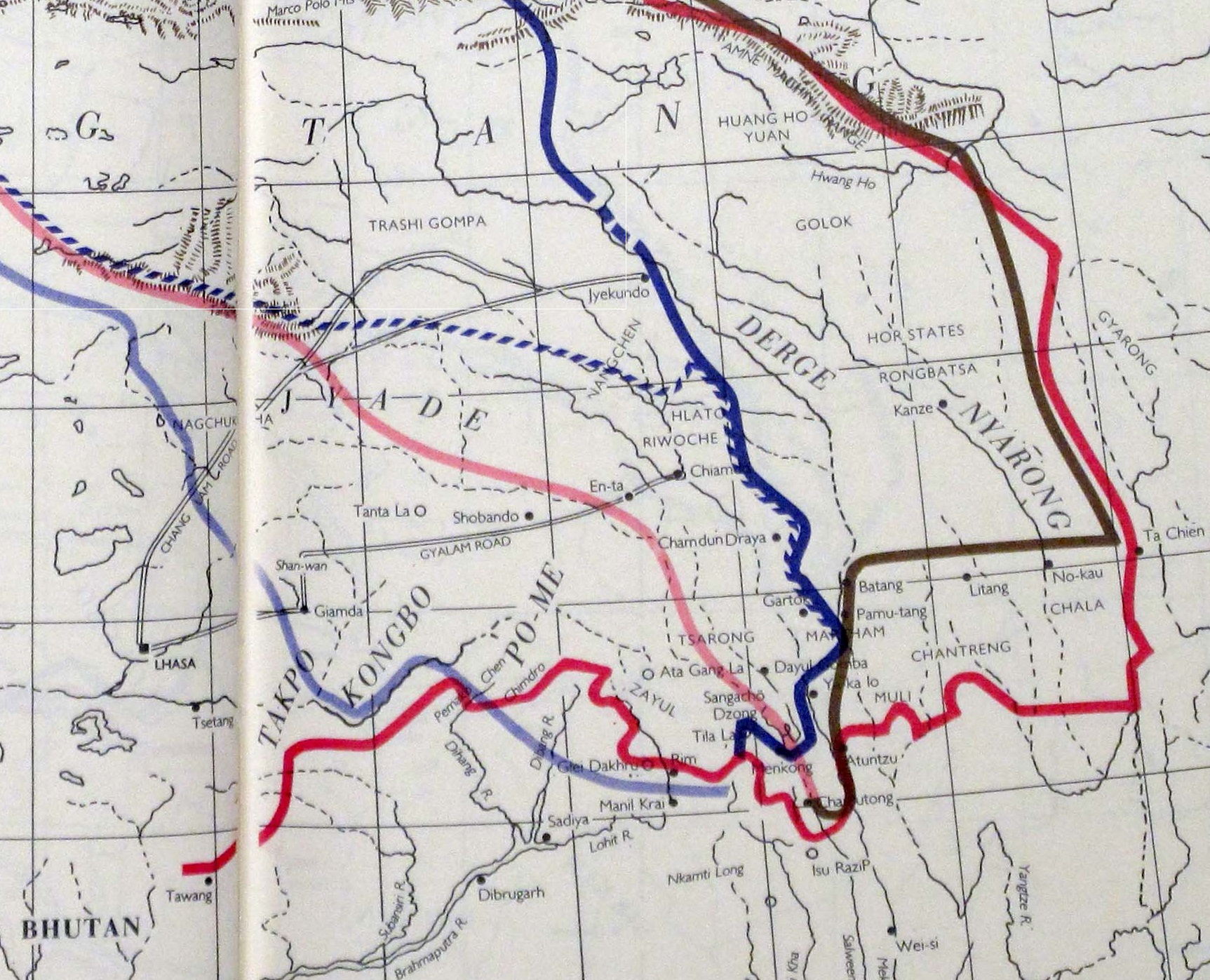
Simla Convention maps – the light blue line represents the initial Chinese claims, the dark blue line was the eventually agreed boundary of Chinese control.

The Sino-Indian War was the result of long-standing border disputes between India and China. In particular, the Chinese government refused to recognize the McMahon Line, which had been established as the boundary between British India and Tibet in 1914. In 1911, the Chinese had encroached and later withdrew from this area.

In the 1962 Sino-Indian War, the Walong sector on the disputed border became a key battleground in the northeastern sector of the war. By October 1962, Chinese forces had already begun advancing into Indian-held territory, and the Indian Army was tasked with defending key positions along the border. At Walong, the responsibility for defense fell to the Indian 11th Infantry Brigade, led by Brigadier N.C. Rawlley (Naveen Chand Rawlley).

== The battle ==
=== 21 October: initial Chinese attack ===
On 21 October 1962, the battle began when Chinese 153rd Infantry Regiment launched their first attack on India's Kibithu Post (40 km north of Walong) in Dhola sector in Arunachal Pradesh's Kameng Division. The battle started by Chinese machine guns and mortars fire from south of Sama, followed by infantry attacks on two platoons with over 3000 soldiers. It started at around midnight and went on for three hours. At about 5 am, the Chinese reinforced their assaulting troops and launched another fierce attack. About 60-70 Chinese soldiers died in that attack and four Indian soldiers were killed, including Naik Bahadur Singh (later awarded Vir Chakra), who took over the light machine gun (LMG) after his LMG detachment was killed, and kept firing till he was hit in the chest.

The Indian defenders, consisting primarily of troops from the 4th Sikh Regiment and the 6th Kumaon Regiment, had prepared defensive positions along the ridges and valleys around Walong. The Indian forces put up a determined defense, engaging the Chinese in numerous skirmishes for nearly four weeks. Using the difficult terrain to their advantage, Indian troops created bottlenecks and ambushes to slow the advancing Chinese forces.

=== 22 October: Indian withdrawal to Walong ===
In the days to follow, multiple such skirmishes and change in deployments took place, both from the Indian and the Chinese side. Acknowledging that Kibithu could not be defended, 6 Kumaon was ordered to withdraw to Walong.

=== 23 October: India's defensive win ===
23 October 1962 marks a landmark Indian win against the 153 Regt of PLA (Chengdu Sub area) when Delta Company of 6 Kumaon under Lt Bikram Singh Rathore (IC 11867) was ordered to establish screen position on Ashi Hill (NH 5484). Lt. Bikram Singh planned and executed a classic ambush at a small hanging bridge over Namti Nallah (5 km away from Walong). Lt Bikram removed the last few planks of the hanging bridge and positioned his men at various positions adjoining Namti Nullah and sighted the MMGs and Mortars of his men on spots likely to be enemy position and to bring down accurate fire. Lt Bikram Singh briefed his soldiers to hold fire until he fired the first 'Very Light'. At 3 a.m. on 23 October, the Chinese Army marching towards Walong walked down Ashi hill to reach the hanging bridge on Namti Nullah. The first Chinese soldier of 153 Regiment crossed the bridge and stepped on the last few plank and fell into the nullah. The following Chinese soldiers milled around and Lt. Bikram Singh fired the first Very Light revealing the Chinese in a cramped path of a planned accurate fire of Indian MMG and Mortar fire. About 200 Chinese troops were killed or wounded in this action against nine Indian fatalities. At 4 a.m. the screen by Delta Company of 6 Kumaon was ordered to withdraw. After the success at Namti Nullah, The Delta Company of 6 Kumaon was tasked to occupy critical defenses on "West Ridge" overlooking the Advanced Landing Grounds, Walong.

=== 24 October to 13 November: skirmishes ===
On 5 November, there were multiple exchanges of fire between the Indian and the Chinese troops when a company under then Captain Ravi Mathur (later awarded Vir Chakra) was asked to occupy Green Pimple and rescue an Assam Rifles patrol which was ambushed in the area.

On 29 October, due to the difficulties encountered by the China's 153rd Infantry Regiment, General Staff Department of PLA ordered 130th Infantry Division to Walong direction in support of Chamdo Military sub-District, which arrived in the Walong sector on 8 November, and participated in the offensive from 14 November.

=== 14-16 November: main battle ===
On 14 November 1962, 6 Kumaon attacked and captured Chinese defenses in the Walong sector, Arunachal Pradesh, without any artillery or aerial support. This was the only battle of the war in which an Indian unit attacked the Chinese, rather than defending. The attack continued until 15 November but the captured positions could not be sustained because of a lack of ammunition, heavy casualties and large enemy buildup.

The main Battle of Walong was on 16 November, when a large number of soldiers of the PLA 130th Division (People's Republic of China) attack on approx. 100 soldiers of Delta Company of 6 Kumaon which were holding West Ridge. Lt. Bikram was tasked to hold this defense at all costs till 1100 hours and he promised Brigadier N.C. Rawley that he would never withdraw & hold on till his end. Waves of Chinese attacks came on his post one after the other. However, Kumaonis fought gallantly and repulsed the attack. Then the Chinese fanned out and the next attack came with an overwhelming superiority of numbers from three sides (the fourth side was a steep cliff) and was supported by machine gun fire & artillery bombardment. The tenacity of the troops still prevented the Chinese from capturing West Ridge, however at a heavy price in lives. By now, Lt Bikram Singh had held on to the post well beyond the assigned time of 1100 hrs. He was now left with a handful of troops, all their ammunition was exhausted and had no logistical support. They then engaged in hand-to-hand combat and fought to the last man and bullet. In the words of Brig. N. C. Rawlley, MC,

"He (Lt. Bikram Singh) held on as long as humanly possible. Very few men from his Company managed to escape. The bulk of them being killed and wounded on the hill. Under his courageous and gallant leadership the men fought until all their ammunition was exhausted and they were completely overrun. Bikram's message to me over the wireless was that he would hold on and not withdraw. He has fulfilled these words to the limit."

By 16 November 1962, however, after suffering heavy casualties and running low on supplies, the Indian forces were ordered to withdraw. The Chinese forces took control of Walong, but their advance was considered by Indians had been significantly delayed by the Indian resistance. Indians were defeated at Walong, however the Chinese withdrawal allowed India to regain the territory.

== Aftermath ==
=== Casualties ===
It is said that five times as many Chinese soldiers died in this battle of 16 November on West Ridge. Overall, the killed and wounded numbered 642 Indians and 752 Chinese. Only 17 Indian soldiers of Delta Company returned from this battle.

=== Gallantry awards ===
Vir Chakras were awarded to following 5 soldiers of 6 Kumaon for their actions in the battle:

1. Major Prem Nath Bhatia, Vir Chakra.
2. Captain Ravi Kumar Mathur, Vir Chakra.
3. Captain B.C. Chopra, Vir Chakra, AMC.
4. Lieutenant A.S. Khatri, Vir Chakra.
5. Naink Bahadur Singh, Vir Chakra, martyred on 21 October 1962.

The 6 Kumaon battalion celebrates 14 November as Walong Day, and there is a Hut of Remembrance memorial with his statue lies next to Kalika Mata Temple at Kibithu.

In March 1963, a cremation party of 6 Kumaon, led by Major Prem Nath Bhatia reached Walong to cremate Lt. Bikram Singh and soldiers of Delta Company on West Ridge, however, due to heavy snow, the operation could not be completed. Subsequently, this assignment could not be completed because of the untimely death of Maj. Bhatia in 1965, in a road accident.

In 1986 (almost 24 years after the Battle of Walong) a patrol party of the 6th Battalion of The Assam Regiment climbed up to West Ridge and discovered the skeletal remains of the soldiers of Delta Company of 6 Kumaon who died fighting on 16 November 1962. A lot of war relics such as helmets, LMG magazines, water bottles and used/burnt ammunition and a pair of binoculars (possibly of the company commander, Lt. Bikram Singh) were also found on the site. The Patrol party of 6th Assam Regiment cremated the bodies of at least 37 soldiers of Delta Company and kept their ashes in a make shift memorial on the West Ridge. 6th Assam Regiment also constructed a memorial of "Unknown Soldiers" displaying the helmets and battle relics. This memorial is also known as Helmet Top Post and is a short drive from Walong town. Based on this development, the records of the Kumaon Regiment have been updated with the following citation "remarks Killed/missing mentioned on the authorization of ....... Records of the Kumaon Regiment. Letter no A4/380/6/Stats dt/ 15/04/88 (Ref File No. 260/on Page 97)".

== Legacy ==
=== Morale booster ===
The Battle of Walong has become a symbol of Indian resistance during the 1962 war, despite the overall outcome of the conflict. The Battle of Walong is remembered by Indians for the bravery of the Indian soldiers who fought against overwhelming odds. The delaying action at Walong gave the Indian Army time to regroup further south, preventing a deeper Chinese advance into Indian territory. The Sino-Indian War ended shortly after the Battle of Walong, with China declaring a unilateral ceasefire on 21 November 1962.

Researchers of PLA Academy of Military Science also noted the Indian forces encountered in Walong has a "significantly and notably higher morale and will to resist", especially compared to their fellow Indians in Kejielang River and Aksai Chin.

=== Memorials ===
The 6 Kumaon battalion celebrates 14 November as Walong Day. There are several war memorials:

- Walong War Memorial next to Walong Advanced Landing Ground on NH-113 commemorates the martyrs of battle of Walong, with the names of 32 martyrs of 4th Sikh Regiment and 17 martyrs of 4th Dogra Regiment. In 2012, a memorial was built in Walong to commemorate the 50th anniversary of the battle. Veterans and military historians continue to study the battle for its lessons in mountain warfare, especially the importance of terrain and logistics. A canopied memorial to the Indian war dead of 1962 was erected next to the airstrip with the following verses composed by a Walong veteran inscribed on it:

The sentinel hills that round us stand
bear witness that we loved our land.
Amidst shattered rocks and flaming pine
we fought and died on Namti Plain.

O Lohit gently by us glide
pale stars above us softly shine
as we sleep here in sun and rain.

- Helmet Top Post War Memorial, on the cliff between Walong and Tilam, there is Helmet Top Walong War Memorial in the memory of unknown soldiers who fought till the last bullet.
- Kibithu Hut of Remembrance memorial, with Vir Chakra awardee Bahadur Singh's statue, lies next to Kalika Mata Temple on NH-113.
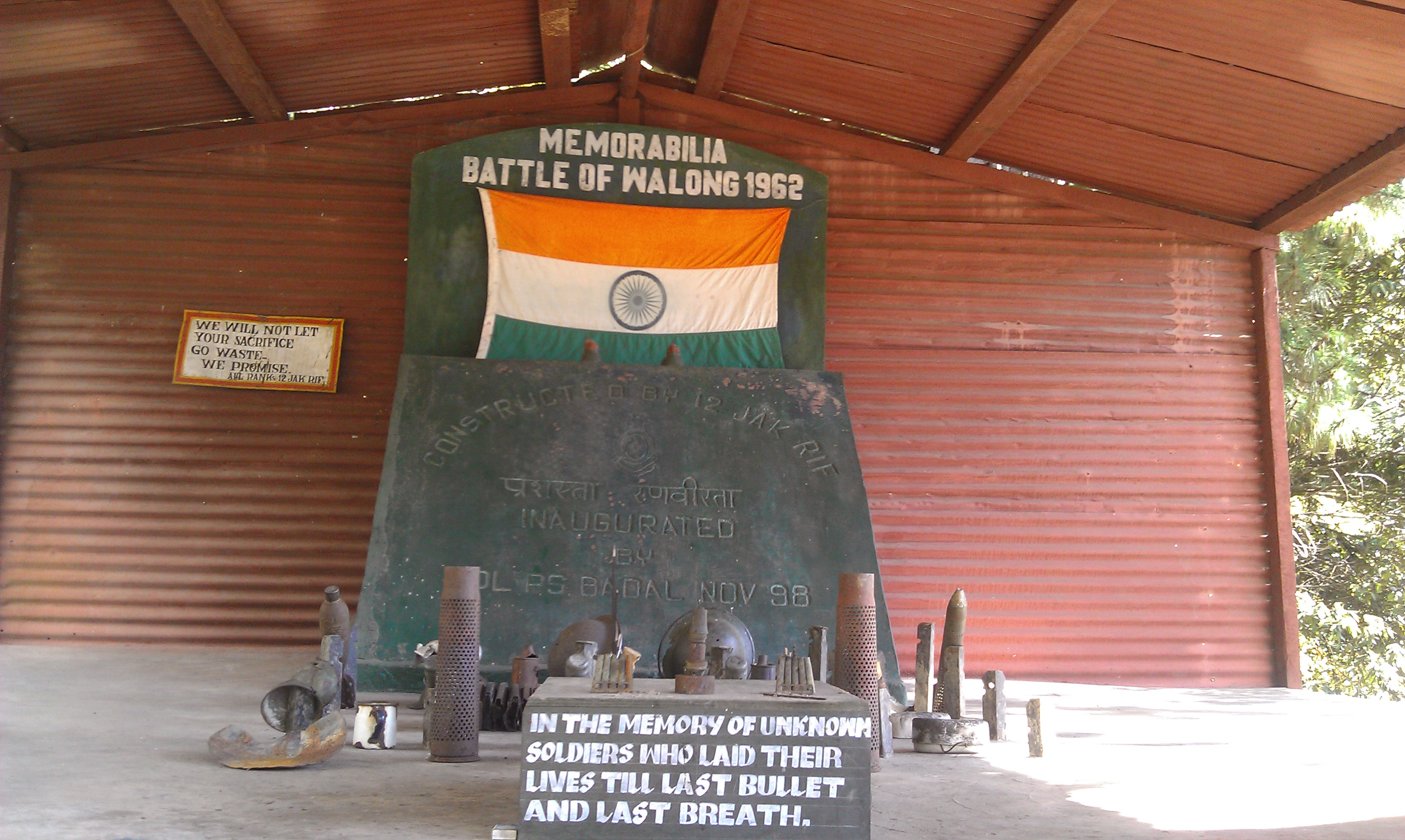
Battle of Walong memorial, built by 12 JAK Rif at Helmet Top where Indian soldier's helmets and other military gear were found at this location.

== See also ==
- Battle of Bum La Pass
- Battle of Rezanga La
