= Watong =

Coordinates: 27.885°N 96.808°E

Watong is a village near Hawai, India town Anjaw district of Arunachal Pradesh.
