= Metengliang =

- Village
- Interactive map of Metengliang
- Location in Arunachal Pradesh, India Metengliang (India)
- Coordinates: 28.2053°N 96.5325°E
- Country: India
- State: Arunachal Pradesh
- District: Anjaw district
- Elevation: 1,200 m (3,900 ft)

Languages
  - Official: English
- Time zone: UTC+05:30 (IST)
- Vehicle registration: AR

Metengliang is a village and the headquarters of an eponymous circle in the Anjaw district in the north-eastern state of Arunachal Pradesh, India.

Metengliang is situated on the bank of the Delei River, a tributary of the Lohit River. The nearest town is Hayuliang which is also the headquarters of the subdivision.

The Metengliang Circle had a population of 1,608 people, distributed in 30 villages, as per the 2011 census.
