= National Highway 113 (India) =

National Highway in India

National Highway 113
- Map of National Highway 113 in red

Route information
- Auxiliary route of NH 13
- Length: 165 km (103 mi)

Major junctions
- South end: NH 13 in Hawa Camp
- North end: Kibithu

Location
- Country: India
- States: Arunachal Pradesh

Highway system
- Roads in India; Expressways; National; State; Asian
| ← NH 13 | → NH 313 |

National Highway 113 (NH 113) is a National Highway in North East India that connects Hawa Camp and Kibithu in Arunachal Pradesh. It is a secondary route of National Highway 13. NH-113 runs entirely in the state of Arunachal Pradesh in India. Kibithu is located on the last road head of extreme northeast of India, making NH 113 the easternmost National Highway of India.

== Route ==
NH113 connects Hawacamp, Hayuliang, Hawai and Kibithu in the state of Arunachal Pradesh in India.

== See also ==
- List of national highways in India
- National Highways Development Project
