= NH 113 =

NH 113 may refer to:

- National Highway 113 (India)
- New Hampshire Route 113, United States
