= Yepak River =

Coordinates: 28°06′18″N 97°00′20″E

The Yepak river (Taraon language：ɑ˧˩ɹɑ˥；Yepuk river; Yabak Ti; Yerbi Ti) is a tributary of Zayal Chu (Lohit River) whose source is the Yepak Pok, Anjaw District, Chayu County, Tibet near Walong. It flows southeast, entering Zayal Chu (Lohit River) in Yepak (near Bish point L. camp).

Grasslands and dense forests are in the middle reaches. In the lower reaches, some lands are under shifting cultivation and others are arable .
