= National Highway 713 (India) =

National highway in India

National Highway 713
- Map of the National Highway in red

Route information
- Length: 158 km (98 mi)

Major junctions
- South end: Joram, Arunachal Pradesh
- North end: Koloriang, Arunachal Pradesh

Location
- Country: India
- States: Arunachal Pradesh

Highway system
- Roads in India; Expressways; National; State; Asian
← NH 13	→ NH 713A

National Highway 713, commonly referred to as NH 713 is a National Highway in North East India. It is a spur road of National Highway 13. NH-713 traverses the state of Arunachal Pradesh in India. This highway connects Joram and Koloriang via Palin in Arunachal Pradesh.

== Route ==
Joram – Palin – Sangram – Koloriang.

== Junctions ==
- NH 13 Terminal near Joram.

== See also ==
- List of national highways in India
- List of national highways in India by state
- National Highways Development Project
