= Diphu Pass =

Mountain pass in India, China, and Myanmar

- Location within Arunachal Pradesh
- Elevation: 4,587 metres (15,049 ft)

Third Approach
- Location: China–India–Myanmar tripoint
- Range: Baxoila Ling (Hengduan Mountains)
- Coordinates: 28°9′0″N 97°20′0″E

Diphu Pass
- Traditional Chinese: 底富山口
- Simplified Chinese: 底富山口
Transcriptions
Standard Mandarin
- Hanyu Pinyin: Dǐfù Shānkǒu

Diphu Pass is a mountain pass on the border between India and Myanmar, close to their trijunction with China. The provinces on the two sides of the border are the Arunachal Pradesh state of India and the Kachin State of Myanmar. The Burma part of the 1914 McMahon Line, which demarcated the border between British India and Tibet, runs from Diphu Pass to the Isu Razi Pass.

== History ==
In October 1960, China and Burma (now Myanmar) demarcated their border to Diphu Pass, which is 8 kilometres (5.0 miles) south of the watershed of the mountain ranges. However, this caused a diplomatic row with India, which expected the tri-point to be at the watershed. The dispute has become part of the ongoing border disagreement between China and India regarding Arunachal Pradesh.

== Geography ==
Diphu Pass is located in Anjaw district of Arunachal Pradesh, 120 km northeast of district headquarter at Hawai via Hawai-Walong-Dong-Kibithu-Kaho-Dhipu Pass route. Kaho on LAC is 40 km west of Diphu Pass.

Other features in the area are:

Madwe Lake (approx. 2,900 m), near border pillar number 188 and south of Diphu Pass and north of Kumjawang Pass, is a remote alpine lake in Anjaw district, situated around 20 km east of Dong. Located near the India-China-Myanmar trijunction, it lies in the Mishmi Hills and within the basin of the Lohit River on the Indian side, and the Chindwin River system on the Myanmar side. The nearest major peak is 'Mount Saramati (3,826 m). The area around Madwe Lake is also significant for its ecological value, supporting various species of flora and fauna. Madwe Lake also holds cultural importance for the indigenous communities residing in the region.

Kumjawang Pass (approx. 3,000 m), near border pillar number 187 and south of Diphu Pass and Mudwe Lake, lies around 35 km east of Hawai in Anjaw district. It connects Arunachal Pradesh to Myanmar, and lies in the Mishmi Hills. This watershed saddle, on the Indian side is flanked by the Lohit River, while the Myanmar side connects to the Chindwin River basin. The nearest high peak is Mount Saramati (3,826 m).

== Transport ==
=== Road ===
It is approximately 30km away from Dong, Arunachal Pradesh.

=== Airway ===
Nearest air connectivity is 60 km away at Walong airstrip.

== See also ==
- Sino-Indian border dispute
- Diphu
