= Kaho, Arunachal Pradesh =

Kaho
- Village
- Interactive map of Kaho
- Location in Arunachal Pradesh, India Kaho (India)
- Coordinates: 28°18′13″N 97°01′20″E
- Country: India
- State: Arunachal Pradesh
- District: Anjaw district
- Elevation: 1,240 m (4,070 ft)

Languages
  - Official: English
- Time zone: UTC+05:30 (IST)
- PIN: 792104
- ISO 3166 code: IN-AR
- Vehicle registration: AR

Kaho is a small village on the banks of the Lohit River on the India-China Line of Actual Control (LAC) in the Anjaw district in the Indian state of Arunachal Pradesh.

== History ==
Area was scene of 1962 Battle of Walong.

== Geography ==
The village is at an elevation of 1,240 metres (4,070 ft). It is 580 km east of Itanagar, nearly 70 km north of the district headquarters at Hawai, nearly 8 km south of the India-China Line of Actual Control, 30 km west of Diphu Pass which lies south of India-China-Myanmar tri-junction and India's easternmost point, and 10 km northeast of Kibithu block headquarter. Khao has an Indian Army checkpost.

Kaho (on the left bank of Lohit river and to the west of Kangri Karpo or Rongto Chu valley) is one of the seven villages of the Kibithu (on the right bank of Lohit River) block in Arunachal Pradesh's Anjaw district through which the river Lohit flows and divides the scenic region into the west and east banks connected at several places by foot suspension and Bailey bridges.

Minutang (Latitude 28° 11' 54" N & Longitude 96° 31' 53" E), also on the right bank of Lohit River on Kibithoo-Kaho-Minutang route nearly 5 km north of Kaho and nearly 15 km northeast of Kibithoo, is the first India-administered village on India-Tibet LAC.

== Administration ==
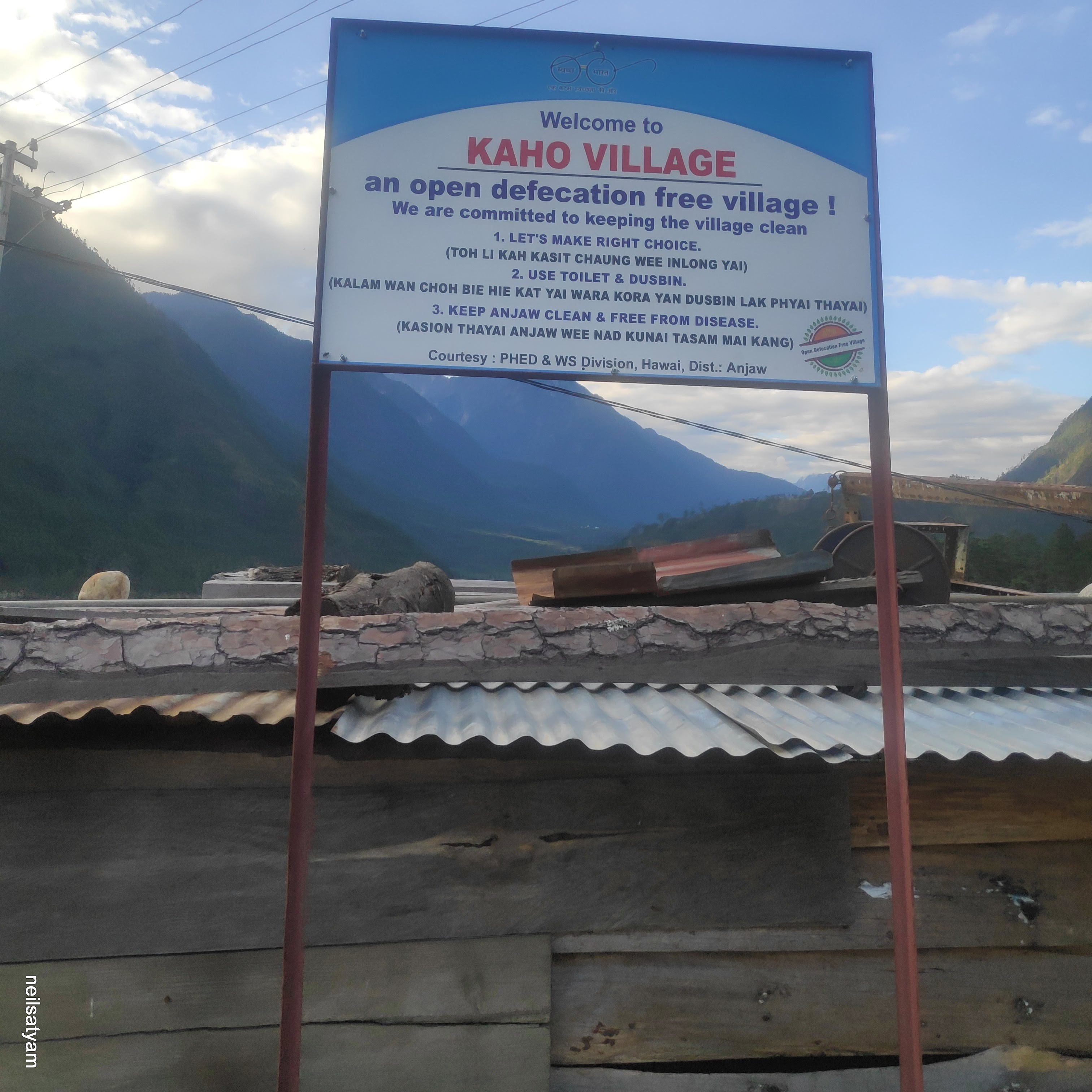
Kaho.

As per the constitution of India and the Panchyati Raaj Act, Kaho is administrated by a sarpanch (head of village) who is the elected representative. The residents suffer from a lack of basic amenities. The village's health center is shut and children have to attend the high school in Kibithoo, located around 5 km away, on the north bank of the Lohit river. There is a 24 hour power supply from the hydroelectric power station on Lohit River, which was built in 2007.

== Demographics ==
=== Culture ===
Kaho is inhabited by the Meyor community, who speak the Zakhring language, and are Buddhist by faith.

=== Population ===
According to a 2011 census, the village had a population of 65 residents and a literacy rate of 64.15%, which was lower than the 65.38% for the state of Arunachal Pradesh. Male literacy stood at 74.07% while the female literacy rate was 53.85%. The village population of children ages 0–6 was 12, which constitutes 18.46% of the population of the village.

== Tourism ==
Kaho will be projected as the first village of the country by team Discover FarEast with the help of district administration. As of 2025, the Kaho village on the left bank of Lohit River can be reached by a day's trek from Kibitoo via the foot suspension bridge across the Lohit river. The trekking to the mountain top on LAC, overlooking a Chinese military post, the Lohit river, a Buddhist monastery, etc., are the attractions.

== Transport ==
The nearest air connectivity is 30 km south at the Walong airstrip in Walong.

Kibithu is connected by a blacktopped motorable road which will become part of the Arunachal Pradesh Frontier Highway, projected to be 2,000-kilometre-long (1,200 mi) from Mago-Thingbu to Vijaynagar along the McMahon Line, with a connection to the Trans-Arunachal Highway, East-West Industrial Corridor Highway and Kibithoo, along an alignment as seen here and here. From Kibithu, Kaho is a 10 km northeast via a foot track and foot suspension bridge across the Lohit River. There is a demand to build a motorable blacktopped road and motorable bridge over the Lohit River, between Kibithoo and Kaho-Minutang, as part of the Arunachal Frontier Highway.

== See also ==
- North-East Frontier Agency
