= National Highway 13 (India) =

National Highway in India

National Highway 13
- NH13 in Arunachal Pradesh (visible on interaction)
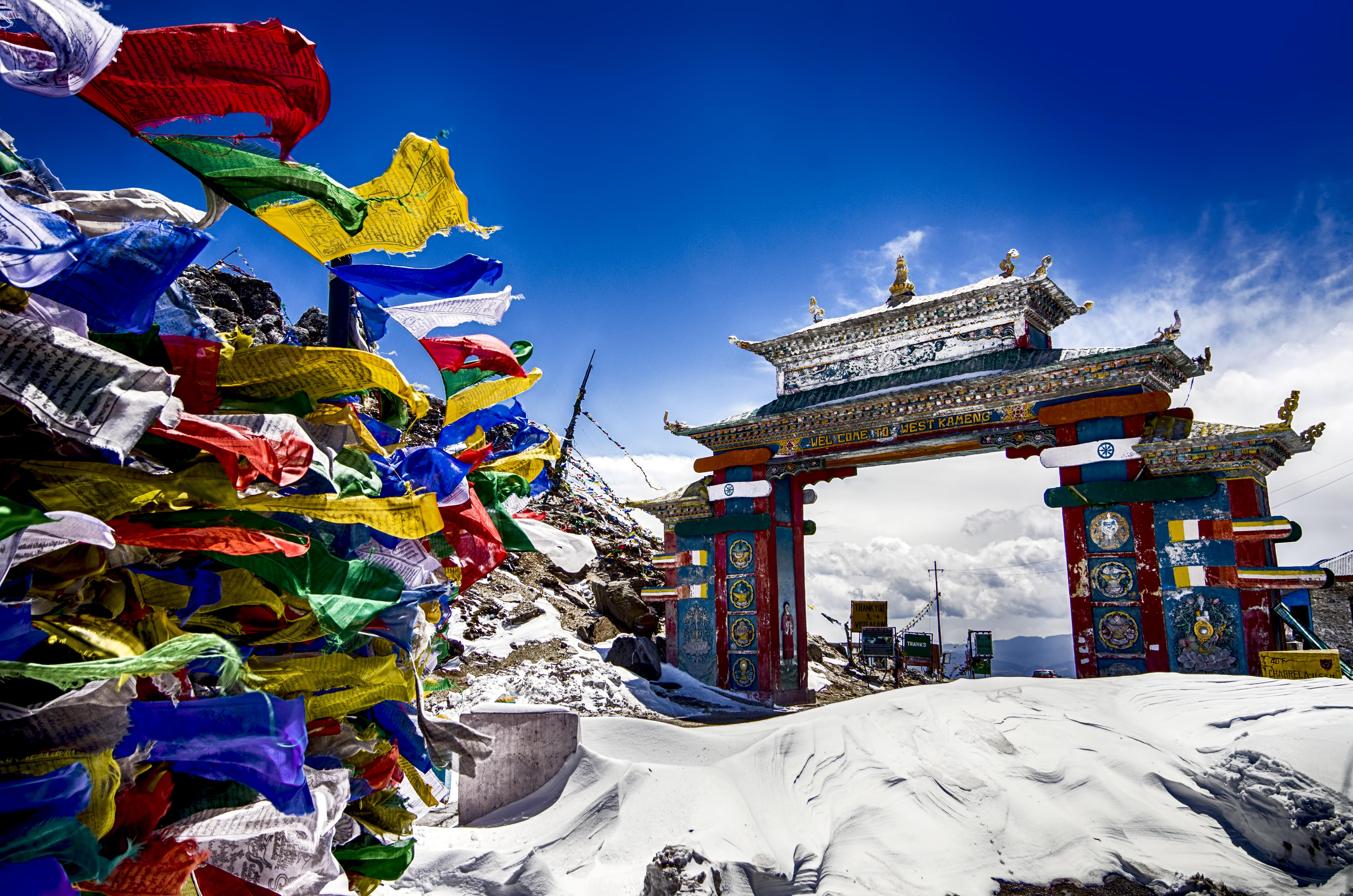
- Sela Pass Welcome Gate on NH 13

Route information
- Length: 1,559 km (969 mi)

Major junctions
- West end: Tawang
- East end: Wakro, Lohit district

Location
- Country: India
- States: Arunachal Pradesh

Highway system
- Roads in India; Expressways; National; State; Asian
← NH 13	→ NH 15

National Highway 13 (NH 13), part of the larger Trans-Arunachal Highway network, is a 1,559 km long two-lane national highway across Arunachal Pradesh in India running from Tawang in northwest to Wakro in southeast. Entire route became operational in 2018 when 6.2 km long Dibang River Bridge was completed across Dibang River. Sela Tunnel, a shorter alternative route with target completion by Jan/Feb 2022, will provide all-weather connectivity. Before the renumbering of highways, it was known as NH 229 and NH52. This strategically important highway enhances Indian military's capabilities in combating the threat of China's Western Theater Command opposite India's eastern sector of Line of Actual Control.

== Route ==
NH13 links Tawang, Bomdila, Nechipu, Seppa, Sagalie, Ziro, Daporijo, Along, Pasighat, Tezu and terminates at its junction with NH-15 near Wakro in the state of Arunachal Pradesh.

== Junctions ==
NH 713A near Joram
NH 713 near Hoj
NH 513 near Pasighat
NH 515 near Pasighat
NH 313 near Meka
NH 115 near Meka
NH 113 near Hawacamp
NH 15 Terminal near Wakro.

== See also ==
- Arunachal Frontier Highway, proposed along Indo-China border across upper Arunachal Pradesh
- Arunachal East-West Corridor, proposed across foothills of lower upper Arunachal Pradesh
- List of national highways in India
- National Highways Development Project
