= Goiliang =

- Village
- Interactive map of Goiliang
- Location in Arunachal Pradesh, India Goiliang (India)
- Coordinates: 28.1448867°N 96.6389179°E
- Country: India
- State: Arunachal Pradesh
- District: Anjaw district
- Elevation: 1,000 m (3,300 ft)

Languages
  - Official: English
- Time zone: UTC+05:30 (IST)
- Vehicle registration: AR

Goiliang is a village and the headquarters of an eponymous circle in the Anjaw district in the north-eastern state of Arunachal Pradesh, India.

Goiliang is situated on the bank of the Dau River (or Dav River), a tributary of the Lohit River. The nearest town is Hayuliang which is also the headquarters of the subdivision.

The Goiliang Circle had a population of 1,681 people in the 2011 census.
