= Kibithu =

Kibithu Kibithoo
- Village
- Interactive map of Kibithu
- Location in Arunachal Pradesh, India Kibithu (India)
- Coordinates: 28°16′49″N 97°01′04″E
- Country: India
- State: Arunachal Pradesh
- District: Anjaw district
- Elevation: 1,240 m (4,070 ft)

Languages
  - Official: English
- Time zone: UTC+05:30 (IST)
- ISO 3166 code: IN-AR
- Vehicle registration: AR

Kibithu, also spelled Kibithoo, is a village in Arunachal Pradesh in Anjaw district, India. It is one of the easternmost permanently populated towns of India, located on the LAC (line of actual control) at 28°16′49″N 97°01′04″E. It is nearly 70 km north of district headquarter at Hawai, nearly 15 km south of India-China LAC (Kaho), and 40 km west of Diphu Pass near India-China-Myanmar tri-junction. The Lohit River enters India north of Kibithu at Kaho. Nearest air connectivity is 20 km in the south at Walong airstrip in Walong. It is considered India's first village.

== History ==
Many Indian soldiers sacrificed their lives there before slaying approximately 4000 Chinese troops at Namti in the Battle of Walong. The Chinese army still has a sizable deployment of troops opposite Kibithu Tatu, Tithang and at Rongto Chu valley west of Tithang (Rima). The entire Chinese deployment opposite Kibithu is maintained via the Rau transit point. Prior to 1962 Indians were supplying rice and other rations from Kibithu to Rima cooperative for Tibetan villagers. These rations were ultimately consumed by Chinese People's Liberation Army troops during their deployment before 1962 war.

== Transport ==
The 2,000-kilometre-long (1,200 mi) proposed Mago-Thingbu to Vijaynagar Arunachal Pradesh Frontier Highway along the McMahon Line, (will intersect with the proposed East-West Industrial Corridor Highway) and will pass through this district, alignment map of which can be seen here and here.

== Tourism ==
Kiithu is part of the Bharat Ranbhoomi Darshan initiative of the Indian Military which will boost border tourism, patriotism, local infrastructure and economy while reversing civilian outward migration from these remote locations, it entails 77 battleground war memorials in border area including the Longewala War Memorial, Sadhewala War Memorial, Siachen base camp, Kargil, Galwan, Pangong Tso, Rezang La, Doklam, Bum La, Cho La, etc.

== India-China Border Personnel Meeting point ==
It is also one of the five officially agreed Border Personnel Meeting points between the Indian Army and the People's Liberation Army of China for regular consultations and interactions between the two armies, which helps in defusing stand-offs.

== See also ==
- Arunachali cuisine
- List of institutions of higher education in Arunachal Pradesh
- List of people from Arunachal Pradesh
- North-East Frontier Agency
- Religion in Arunachal Pradesh
