= Walong Advanced Landing Ground =

Indian Air Force airstrip

Walong Advanced Landing Ground
- IATA: none; ICAO: VEWL

Summary
- Airport type: Military
- Owner/Operator: Indian Air Force
- Location: Walong, Anjaw District, Arunachal Pradesh, India
- Elevation AMSL: 3,717 ft / 1,133 m
- Coordinates: 28.13°N 97.01°E

Map

Runways
Direction	Length		Surface
Direction	ft	m	Surface
05/23	1,970	600	Concrete

Walong Advanced Landing Ground is an Indian Air Force airstrip located at Walong on the banks of Lohit River in Anjaw District of Arunachal Pradesh, India. It is nearly 50 km north of district headquarter at Hawai, nearly 30 km south of India-China LAC (near Kaho village), and 70 km southwest of Diphu Pass near India-China-Myanmar tri-junction.

== History ==
The airstrip was in operation during 1962 Indo-China War and was later abandoned. In 2013 plan was initiated for the revival of the airstrip. The project was completed in a record 21 months time period and declared open on 23 October 2015.

== See also ==
Military bases

- List of ALGs
- List of Indian Air Force stations
- India-China military deployment on LAC
- List of disputed India-China areas

Borders

- Line of Actual Control (LAC)
- Borders of China
- Borders of India

Conflicts

- Sino-Indian conflict
- List of disputed territories of China
- List of disputed territories of India

Other related topics

- India-China Border Roads
- List of extreme points of India
- Defence Institute of High Altitude Research
