= National Highway 313 (India) =

National Highway in Arunachal Pradesh, India

National Highway 313
- Map of National Highway 313 in red
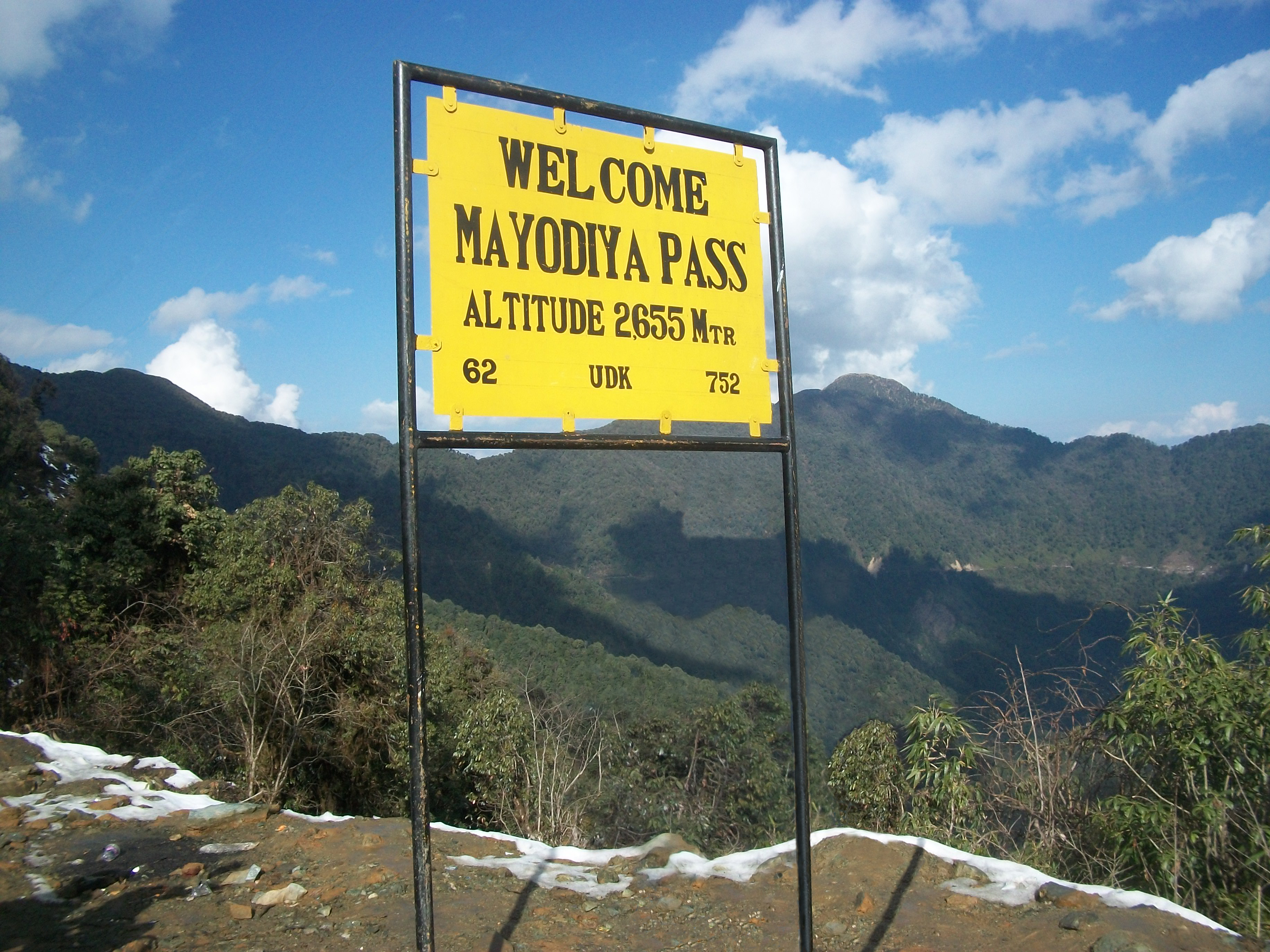
- Mayodia Pass

Route information
- Length: 235 km (146 mi)

Major junctions
- South end: Meka
- North end: Anini

Location
- Country: India
- States: Arunachal Pradesh

Highway system
- Roads in India; Expressways; National; State; Asian
← NH 13	→ NH 313

National Highway 313 (NH 313) is a National Highway in North East India that connects Meka, near Roing and Anini in Arunachal Pradesh. It is a spur road of National Highway 13. NH-313 traverses the state of Arunachal Pradesh in India. This highway connects remotely located town of Anini, which is the headquarter of Dibang Valley district.

== Route ==
NH313 starts from its junction with NH-13 near Meka and terminates at Anini.

== Junctions ==
NH 13 Terminal near Meka.

== See also ==
- List of national highways in India
- List of national highways in India by state
