= Hayuliang =

- Town
- Interactive map of Hayuliang
- Location in Arunachal Pradesh, India Hayuliang (India)
- Coordinates: 28.062885°N 96.548023°E
- Country: India
- State: Arunachal Pradesh
- District: Anjaw district
- Elevation: 650 m (2,130 ft)

Languages
  - Official: English
- Time zone: UTC+05:30 (IST)
- ISO 3166 code: IN-AR
- Vehicle registration: AR

Hayuliang is a town and the headquarters of an eponymous subdivision in the Anjaw district in the north-eastern state of Arunachal Pradesh, India. It is on the bank of the Lohit River near the confluence of the Delei River.

The Hayuliang subdivision, administered by an additional divisional commissioner (ADC), covers the entire Delei River basin including the Hayuliang Circle, Metengliang Circle, Goiliang Circle and the Chaglagam Circle. It is divided into two community development blocks, the Hayuliang–Goiliang block and the Chaglagam block.

The region is populated by Mishmis, who speak Digaro Mishmi and Kaman Mishmi languages.

== Location ==
It is 308 km away from Arunachal Pradesh's capital Itanagar, 450 km from Imphal, 515 km from Dispur and 543 km from Shillong.

Nearest railway station is 235 km away at Tinsukia in Assam. Nearest airport is Tezu Airport 100 km away at district headquarter Tezu.

== Climate ==
Climate data for Hayuliang
Month	Jan	Feb	Mar	Apr	May	Jun	Jul	Aug	Sep	Oct	Nov	Dec	Year
Record high °C (°F)	26.0 (78.8)	27.4 (81.3)	31.8 (89.2)	32.5 (90.5)	34.6 (94.3)	39.0 (102.2)	35.7 (96.3)	38.9 (102.0)	38.0 (100.4)	34.0 (93.2)	31.0 (87.8)	30.5 (86.9)	39.0 (102.2)
Mean daily maximum °C (°F)	18.9 (66.0)	18.8 (65.8)	21.0 (69.8)	22.7 (72.9)	27.0 (80.6)	29.2 (84.6)	29.2 (84.6)	30.6 (87.1)	29.2 (84.6)	26.9 (80.4)	23.8 (74.8)	20.9 (69.6)	24.8 (76.7)
Mean daily minimum °C (°F)	8.3 (46.9)	9.7 (49.5)	11.9 (53.4)	14.2 (57.6)	17.2 (63.0)	20.3 (68.5)	21.2 (70.2)	21.5 (70.7)	20.4 (68.7)	16.8 (62.2)	13.3 (55.9)	10.0 (50.0)	15.4 (59.7)
Record low °C (°F)	3.0 (37.4)	5.0 (41.0)	8.0 (46.4)	5.5 (41.9)	10.0 (50.0)	14.0 (57.2)	15.2 (59.4)	17.0 (62.6)	16.0 (60.8)	10.5 (50.9)	8.0 (46.4)	4.0 (39.2)	3.0 (37.4)
Average rainfall mm (inches)	97.5 (3.84)	233.6 (9.20)	396.3 (15.60)	779.1 (30.67)	360.1 (14.18)	560.3 (22.06)	421.7 (16.60)	214.3 (8.44)	239.6 (9.43)	251.7 (9.91)	58.5 (2.30)	83.5 (3.29)	3,696.2 (145.52)
Average rainy days	6.4	10.3	14.4	16.9	13.2	14.9	16.5	9.7	10.1	8.1	3.2	3.6	127.3
Average relative humidity (%) (at 17:30 IST)	76	76	79	79	81	80	82	81	81	80	77	77	79
Source: India Meteorological Department

== Transport ==
It is located on the 2,000-kilometre-long (1,200 mi) proposed Mago-Thingbu to Vijaynagar Arunachal Pradesh Frontier Highway along the McMahon Line, alignment map of which can be seen here and here.

== See also ==
- North-East Frontier Agency
- List of people from Arunachal Pradesh
- Religion in Arunachal Pradesh
- Cuisine of Arunachal Pradesh
- List of institutions of higher education in Arunachal Pradesh
