= Isu Razi Pass =

Border pass between China and Myanmar

- Pumtang L'ka
- Location within Yunnan
- Interactive map of Isu Razi Pass

Third Approach
- Location: Gongshan county, Yunnan, China - Putao District, Kachin, Myanmar
- Range: Gaoligong Mountains, Hengduan Mountains
- Coordinates: 27.6689°N 98.4447°E

Isu Razi Pass is a border pass between China's Yunnan province and Myanmar, close to the border with the Tibet Autonomous Region. To the north of the pass is the Gongshan Derung and Nu Autonomous County of China. To the south is the Putao District of the Kachin State of Myanmar.

== Location ==
The Isu Razi Pass is described as lying on the Irrawaddy–Salween water-parting line.

In the Gongshan county to the north of the pass, the Dulong River (also called Taron or Derung river) flows down from the north, and makes a sharp bend to the west, joining Myanmar's N'Mai Hka River, which is part of the Irrawaddy River basin.

To the southwest of the pass, other tributaries of the N'Mai Hka river flow south. The Salween River basin is to the east of the pass.

Around Isu Razi Pass, it is very sparsely populated, with 3 inhabitants per square kilometer. In the surrounding countryside, mainly mixed forest grows.

== History ==
=== Simla Convention ===
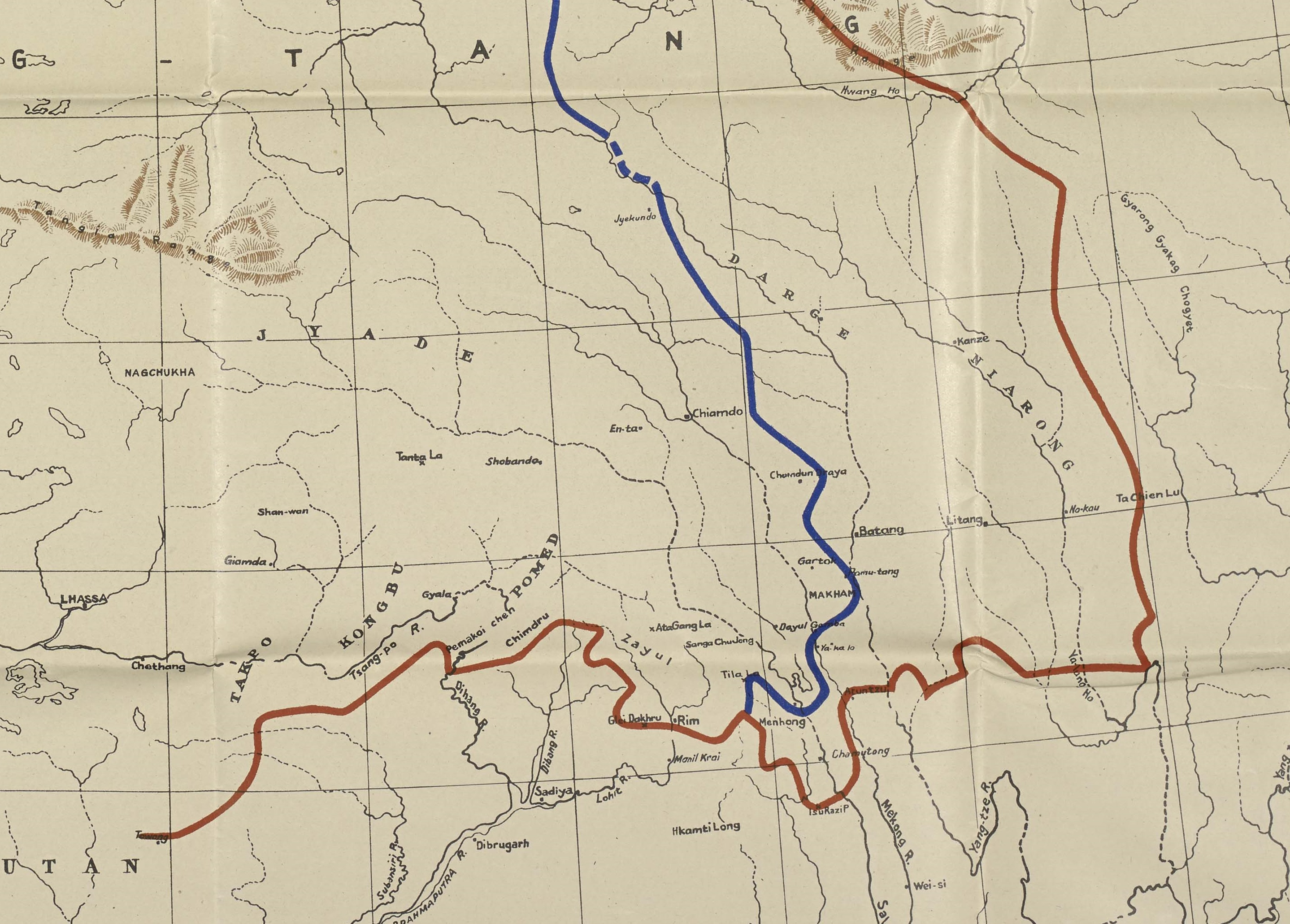
The Simla Convention borders in southeast Tibet, with the 'Red Line' (the border of Tibet) and the 'Blue Line' (the border between Lhasa-controlled 'Outer Tibet' and Peking-controlled 'Inner Tibet')

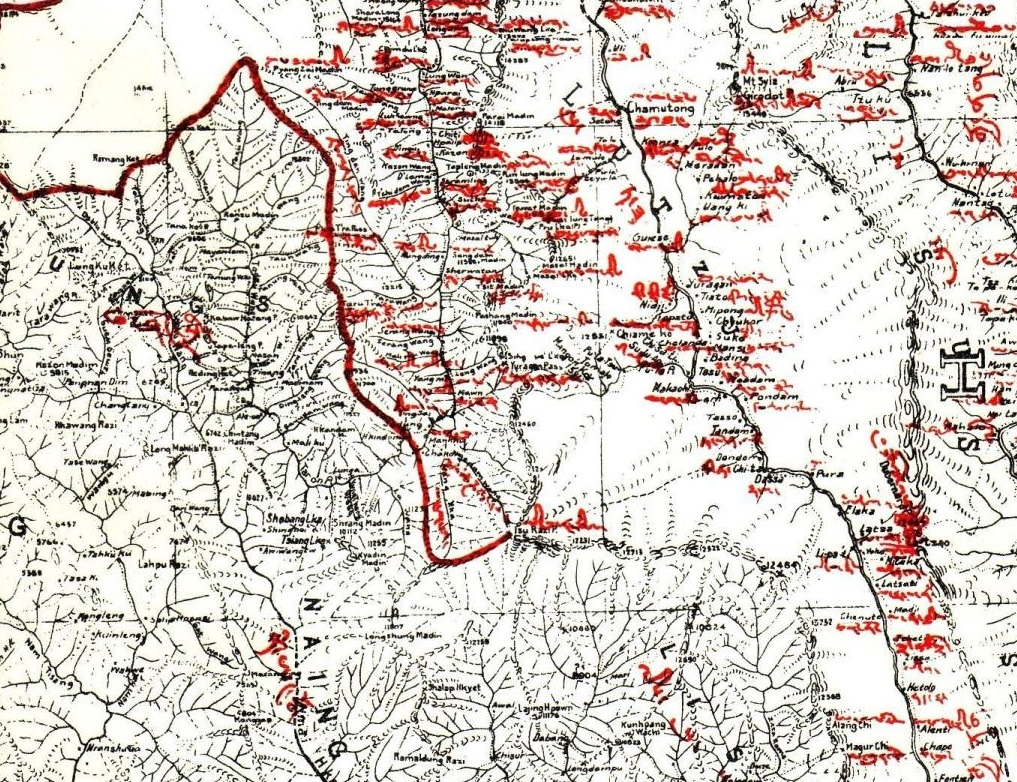
The McMahon Line delineating the border between Tibet and the British Raj ended at the Isu Razi Pass

During 1913–1914, the representatives of Tibet, China and Britain met at Simla to negotiate the relations between Tibet and China. In the course of the negotiations, the borders of Tibet against China as well as British Raj were defined. Isu Razi pass was defined as the trijunction of the three jurisdictions. To the north of the pass was to be 'Inner Tibet', the portion of eastern Tibet that was under the control of China. (It had been so since 1720s.) To the east was to be China proper and to the south and west was the Burmese territory of the British Raj. The Chinese representative however maintained that the Inner Tibet area was already part of China. Since China never ratified the Simla Convention, the Chinese position still persists. The Gongshan Derung and Nu Autonomous County to the north of the Isu Razi pass is part of China's Yunnan province.

The border between Tibet and the British Raj, later called the McMahon Line, was drawn on a more detailed map and negotiated between the representatives of Britain and Tibet. This line ended at the Isu Razi Pass. The border, agreed via an exchange of notes on 24–25 March 1914, was later incorporated in the Simla Convention maps.

=== China–Myanmar border ===
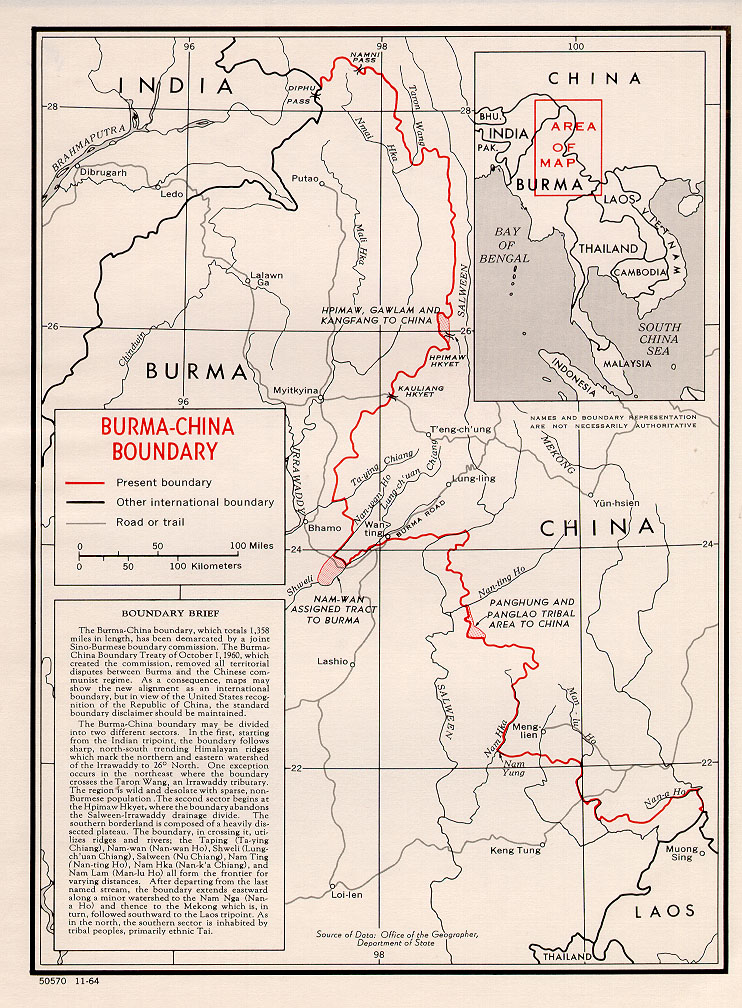
China–Myanmar border agreed in January 1960

After Myanmar (then called Burma) became independent and China took control of Tibet, the two countries had occasional border clashes, and started engaging in border talks in 1955. The talks gained momentum in January 1960, when the prime minister Ne Win was invited to Peking and an agreement was reached within five days. China agreed to use the watershed as the "customary boundary" between the Isu Razi Pass and the Diphu Pass at the trijunction with India. According to scholar Taylor Fravel, this involved China conceding to Myanmar 1,000 square kilometres of territory.

== Bibliography ==
- Fravel, M. Taylor (2008), Strong Borders, Secure Nation: Cooperation and Conflict in China's Territorial Disputes, Princeton University Press, ISBN 1-4008-2887-2
- Mehra, Parshotam (1974), The McMahon Line and After: A Study of the Triangular Contest on India's North-eastern Frontier Between Britain, China and Tibet, 1904-47, Macmillan, ISBN 9780333157374 – via archive.org
- "42. Burma–China Boundary", International Boundary Study, United States Department of State, 30 November 1964 – via archive.org
