= Chaglagam =

- Village
- Interactive map of Chaglagam
- Location in Arunachal Pradesh, India Chaglagam (India)
- Coordinates: 28.3180°N 96.6044°E
- Country: India
- State: Arunachal Pradesh
- District: Anjaw
- Elevation: 1,340 m (4,400 ft)

Languages
  - Official: English
- Time zone: UTC+05:30 (IST)
- ISO 3166 code: IN-AR
- Vehicle registration: AR

Chaglagam is a village and the headquarters of an eponymous circle in Anjaw district in India's north-eastern state of Arunachal Pradesh. It is on the bank of the Delei River.

The Chaglagam Circle contains the upper basin of the Delei River, on the border Zayul County of China's Tibet Autonomous Region. It has a population of 1,681 people, distributed in 18 villages, as per the 2011 census. The population consists of primarily Digaro Mishmi people.

== Geography ==
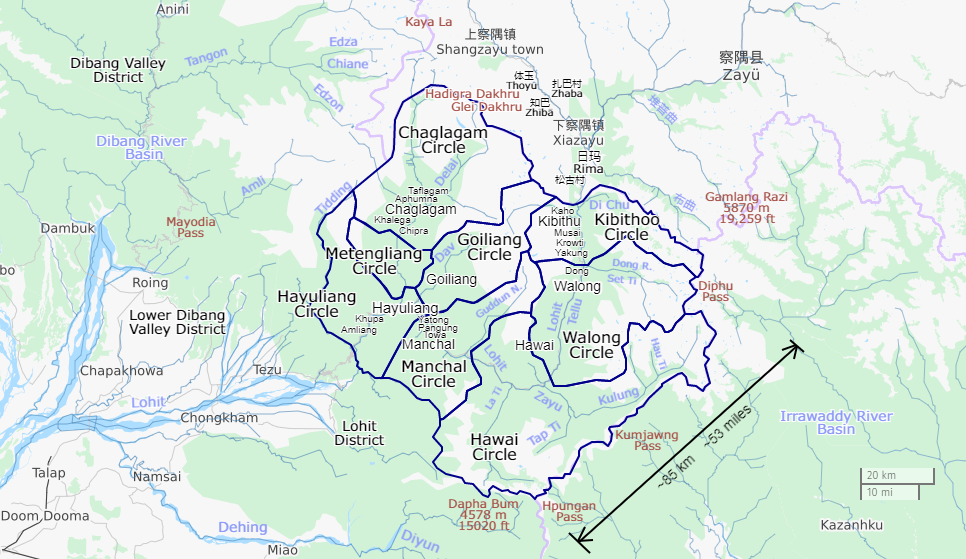
Chaglagam Circle in the Anjaw district

Chaglagam is situated on the bank of the Delei River, (Note: Alternative spellings include Delai and Dalai.) which is a substantial tributary of the Lohit River. The Delei rises below the Glei Pass (Note: It is also called Glei Dakhru in the local language. Alternative spellings include Glei Takru, Glaitakru, Galai Takru, and Galai Tagaru.) on the border with Tibet, and flows through the Chaglagam Circle along with its numerous tributaries (Duren, Kajap, Kazumiyo, Kalangmiyo etc.). It joins the Lohit River near Hayuliang.

Hayuliang is the nearest town to Chaglagam. It is also the headquarters of the Hayuliang Subdivision, which includes Chaglagam.

The Chaglagam Circle borders the Zayul County of the Tibet Autonomous Region of China. The people of Chaglagam traditionally participated in Indo-Tibetan trade between Assam and Zayul, acting as middlemen. They travelled to Zayul via the Glei Pass, which is called Dri La by the Tibetans, (Note: Tibetan: འདྲེ་ལ, Wylie: dre la; Chinese: 知拉山口; pinyin: Zhī lā shānkǒu.) leading to the village of Dri (Note: Its full name is Drepa (Tibetan: འདྲེ་པ, Wylie: dre pa; Chinese: 知巴; pinyin: Zhī bā). Coordinates: 28°34′53″N 96°56′05″E.) in the western Zayul valley. It was said to take 5 days march to Glei Pass from Rima in Tibet and another 20 days to reach Sadiya in Assam. Another pass called Hadigra, to the west of Glei Pass, was also used, but less often.

To the northwest of the Chaglagam Circle is an anomalous jut-in of Tibetan territory called Fishtail-II, a relic of inadequate surveying in the 1914 McMahon Line map. The region is patrolled by both Indian and Chinese troops and occasional stand-offs are reported.

== Chinese incursions ==
In August 2013, China's People's Liberation Army troops intruded 20 to 30 km inside the Indian territory and stayed there for 4 days before going back. India's Indo-Tibetan Border Police (ITBF) patrols the area.

== Transportation ==
Chaglagam is located on the 2,000-kilometre-long (1,200 mi) proposed Mago-Thingbu to Vijaynagar Arunachal Pradesh Frontier Highway along the McMahon Line, alignment map of which can be seen here and here.

== Demographics ==
As per the 2011 Census of India, Chaglagam has 192 residents across 29 households. 155 are male, and 37 are female.

== Bibliography ==
- Kingdon Ward, Frank; Smith, Malcolm (November 1934), "The Himalaya East of the Tsangpo", The Geographical Journal, 84 (5): 369–394, doi:10.2307/1786924, JSTOR 1786924
- Lamb, Alastair (1966), The McMahon Line: a Study in the Relations Between, India, China and Tibet, 1904 to 1914, Vol. 2: Hardinge, McMahon and the Simla Conference, Routledge & K. Paul – via archive.org
- Mehra, Parshotam (1974), The McMahon Line and After: A Study of the Triangular Contest on India's North-eastern Frontier Between Britain, China and Tibet, 1904-47, Macmillan, ISBN 9780333157374 – via archive.org
- Mehra, Parshotam (1979), The North-eastern Frontier, Vol. 1: 1906-14, Oxford University Press, ISBN 978-0-19-561158-8
