= National Highway 713A (India) =

National Highway in North East India

National Highway 713A
- Map of National Highway 713A in red

Route information
- Length: 35 km (22 mi)

Major junctions
- South end: Hoj, Arunachal Pradesh
- North end: Pappu, Arunachal Pradesh

Location
- Country: India
- States: Arunachal Pradesh

Highway system
- Roads in India; Expressways; National; State; Asian
← NH 13	→ NH 415

National Highway 713A (NH 713A) is a National Highway in North East India that connects Hoj and Pappu in Arunachal Pradesh.

== See also ==
- List of national highways in India
- National Highways Development Project
