= Meka, Arunachal Pradesh =

- Interactive map of Meka, Arunachal Pradesh
- Coordinates: 28°06′53″N 95°49′15″E

Meka is a village near Roingin Lower Dibang Valley district of Arunachal Pradesh which is a state in India.
