= Walong =

- town
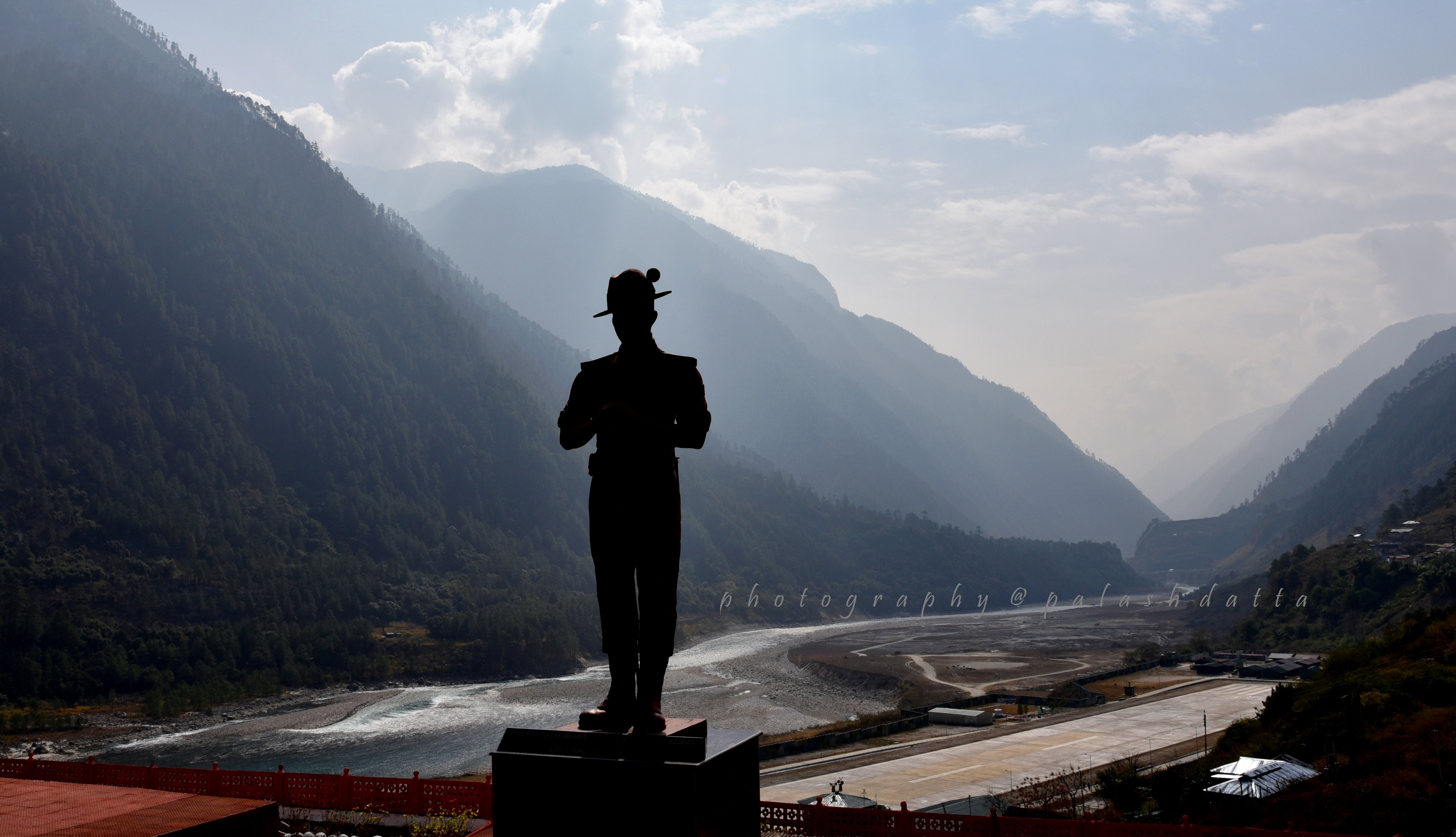
- Walong War Memorial

- Location in Arunachal Pradesh, India
- Coordinates: 28°8′N 97°1′E
- Country: India
- State: Arunachal Pradesh
- District: Anjaw district
  - Density: 13/km^{2} (34/sq mi)

Languages
  - Official: English
- Time zone: UTC+5:30 (IST)
- Nearest city: Tinsukia
- Lok Sabha constituency: Arunachal East
- Vidhan Sabha constituency: Hayuliang
- Climate: Cwa

Walong is an administrative town and the headquarters of eponymous circle in the Anjaw district in eastern-most part of Arunachal Pradesh state in India. It also has a small cantonment of the Indian Army. Walong is on banks of Lohit River, which enters India 35 km north of Walong at India-China LAC at Kaho pass.

Walong is also the easternmost town in mainland India. It is 20 km south of Kibithu, 60 km west of Diphu Pass (near India-China-Myanmar tri-junction), and 90 km north of district headquarter at Hawai. Anjaw district was carved out of Lohit District in 2004.

== Geography ==
Walong lies on the west bank of the Lohit River, a tributary of the Brahmaputra, approximately 20 kilometres south of the Tibetan border. The forest around Walong is rich in wildlife. Rare mammals such as Mishmi takin, Red goral and Leaf muntjac occurs while among birds there is the rare Sclater's Monal. A flying squirrel, the Mishmi Hills Giant Flying Squirrel (Petaurista mishmiensis) also occurs in this district.

== History ==
The enquiries of British officials in 1911 revealed that Walong had been established by Miju Mishmi many years earlier for cattle-rearing and as a refuge for Tibetans who came down or ran away from the north. In the vicinity of Walong, several abandoned villages were found, where Tibetans had lived and then returned to Tibet.

=== 1911 Chinese encroachments ===
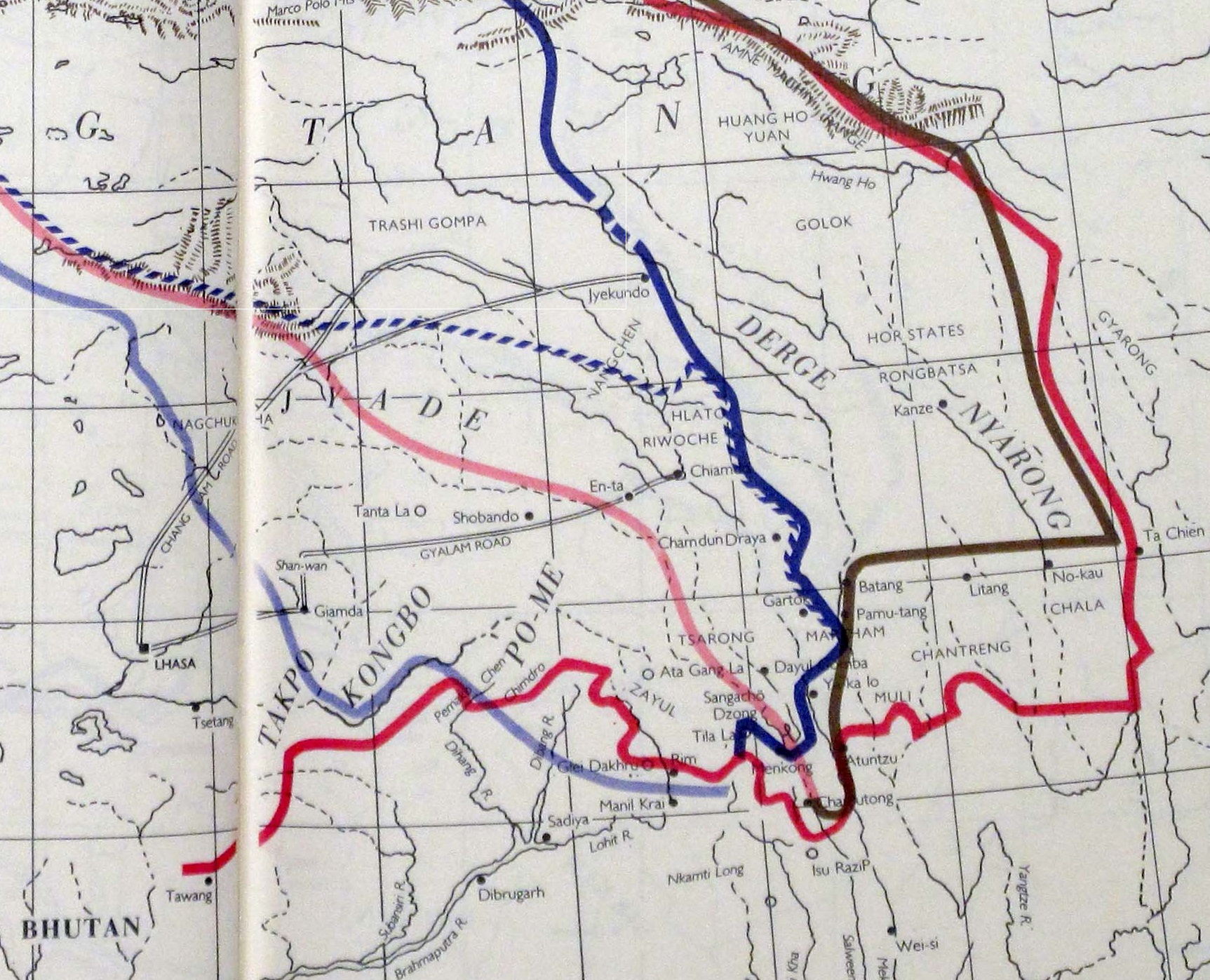
Simla Convention maps – the light blue line represents the initial Chinese claims, the dark blue line was the eventually agreed boundary of Chinese control

During Zhao Erfeng's campaigns in southeastern Tibet (Kham), Chinese troops arrived at Rima on the Tibetan border. After expelling all the Tibetan officials from there, they entered the Walong area and erected a boundary plank at a location called Menilkrai three miles south of Walong, claiming the area to be part of China. After some coaxing, the headman of Walong admitted to the British political officer in 1914 that the Chinese had sent for him and told him to inform the British officials of their claims. The political officer, T. P. M. O'Callaghan, had the plank and the post promptly removed.

Shortly after the Zhao Erfeng's campaigns, the Qing dynasty fell and the Chinese lost all authority in Tibet. Nevertheless, during the 1914 Simla Conference, the Chinese made renewed claims to the Walong area as being part of China (as part of western Kham). The claims were rejected by the Tibetan and British delegates. The McMahon Line boundary, agreed between Tibet and British India, ran a little south of Rima.

=== 1962 war ===
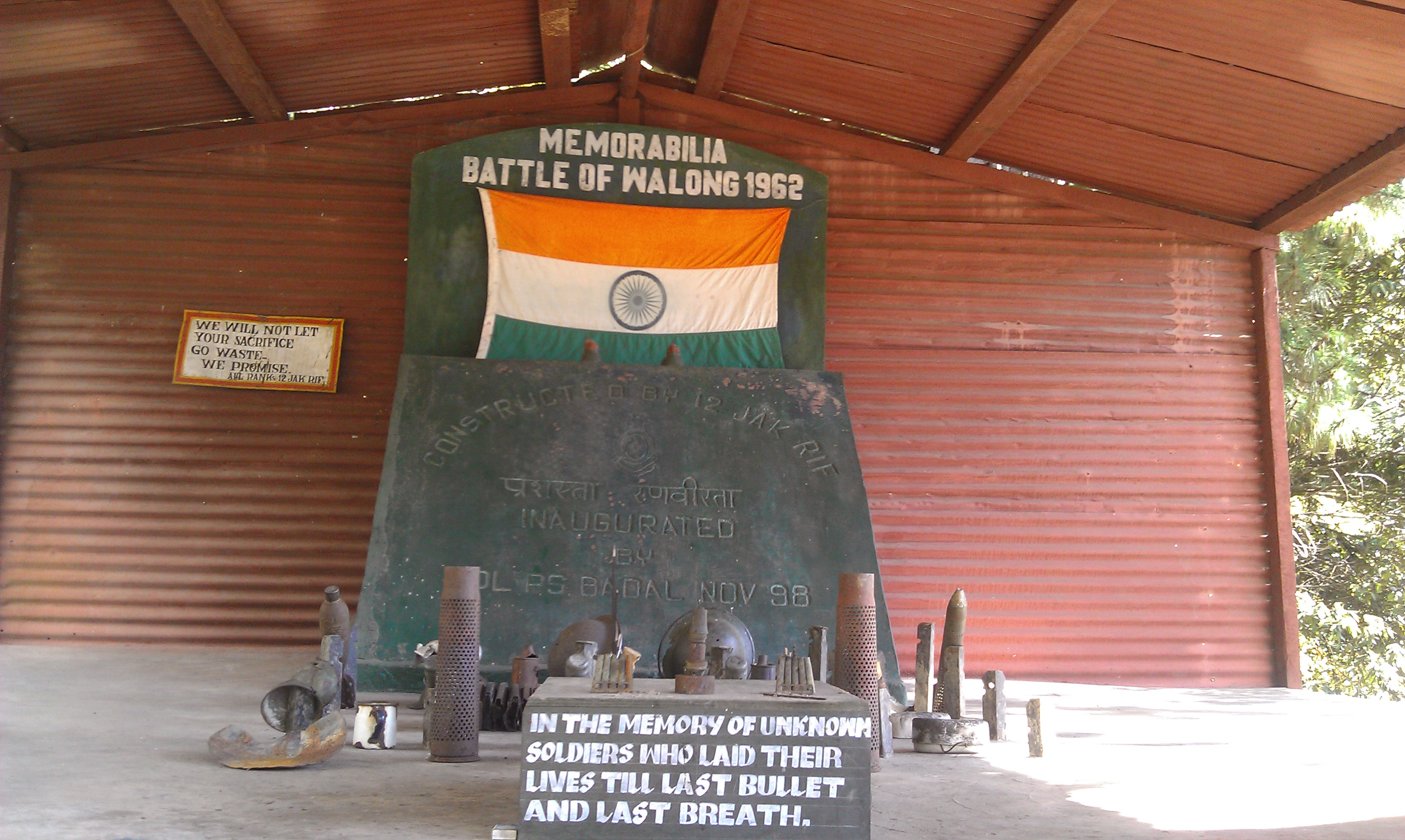
Battle of Walong memorial at 'Helmet Top'. (helmets and other military gear were found at this location).

In autumn of 1962, during the Sino-Indian War, Walong was the scene of the Battle of Walong, where the Indian Army 11th Infantry Brigade battled the Chinese advances.

The killed and wounded numbered 642 Indians and 752 Chinese. Indians were defeated at Walong, however the Chinese withdrawal allowed India to regain the territory.

A canopied memorial to the Indian war dead of 1962 was erected next to the airstrip with the following verses composed by a Walong veteran inscribed on it:

The sentinel hills that round us stand
bear witness that we loved our land.
Amidst shattered rocks and flaming pine
we fought and died on Namti Plain.

O Lohit gently by us glide
pale stars above us softly shine
as we sleep here in sun and rain.

== Transport ==
Walong is approximately 200 km. by road from the district headquarters town of Tezu. It had an Advanced Landing Ground (ALG) which was capable of taking Otters and Caribous during the 1962 Sino-Indian War. Thereafter, it remained abandoned for a long time till 2013 when reconstruction of ALG began. The reconstructed ALG was inaugurated on 23 October 2015. There is an operational helipad.

== Map ==
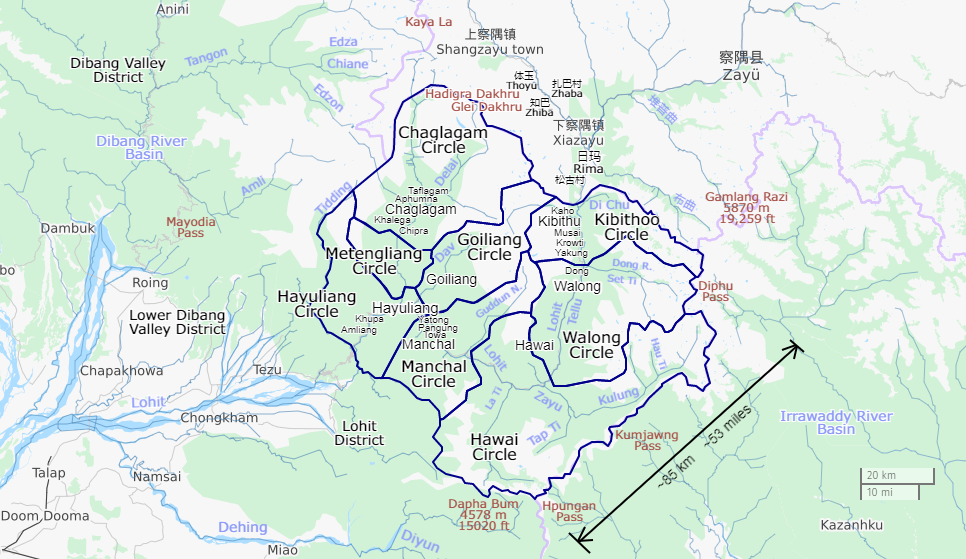
Anjaw with Walong Circle and Walong. The CD Block is Hawai-Walong.

== See also ==
- India–China border infrastructure

== Bibliography ==
- Mehra, Parshotam (1974), The McMahon Line and After: A Study of the Triangular Contest on India's North-eastern Frontier Between Britain, China and Tibet, 1904-47, Macmillan, ISBN 9780333157374 – via archive.org
- Sandhu, P. J. S.; Shankar, Vinay; Dwivedi, G. G. (2015), 1962: A View from the Other Side of the Hill, Vij Books India Pvt Ltd, ISBN 978-93-84464-37-0
