= Hawai, Arunachal Pradesh =

Hawai
- Town
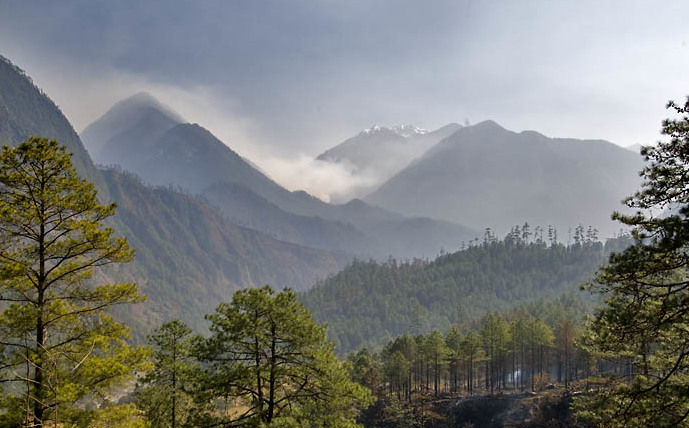
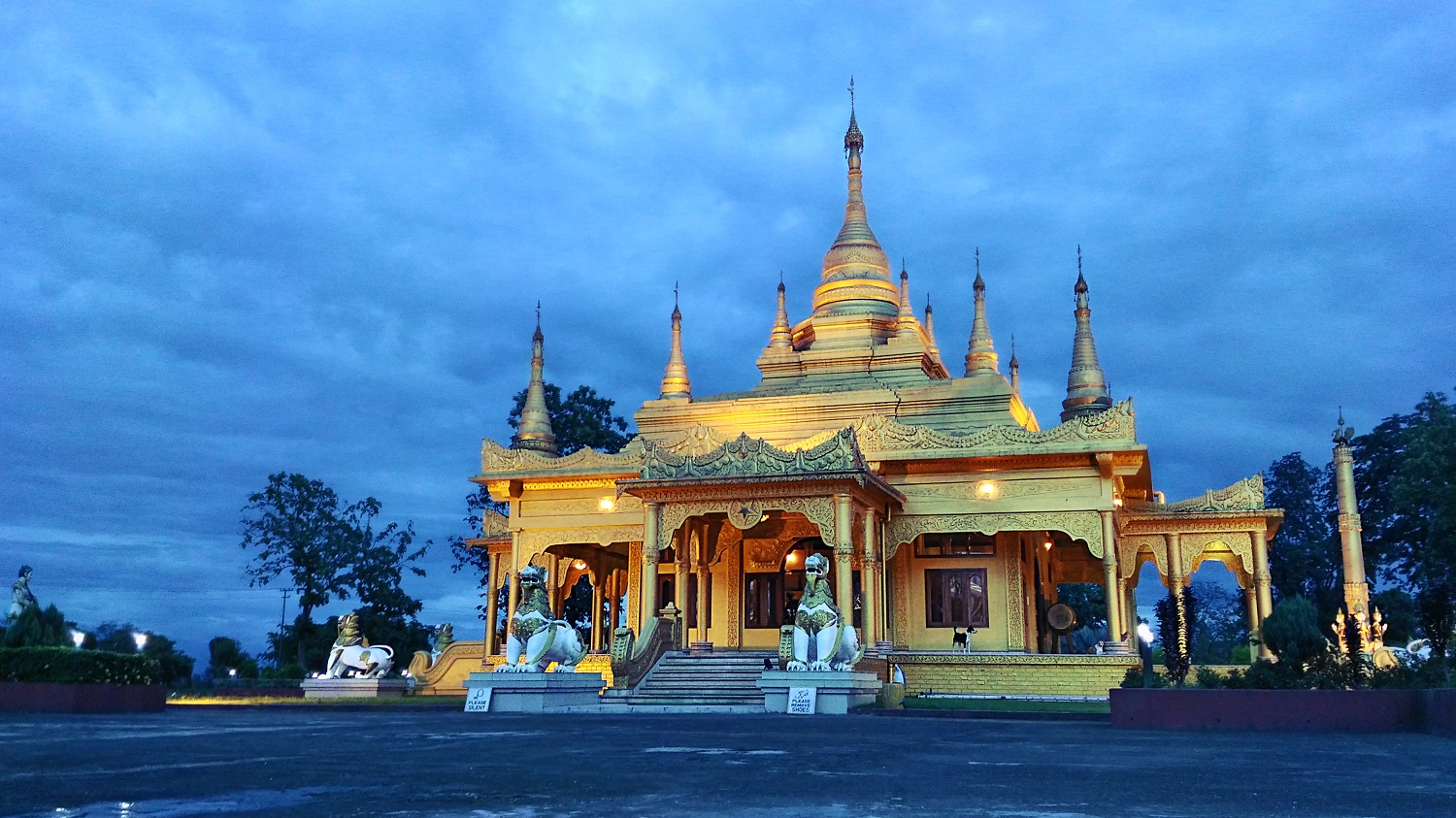
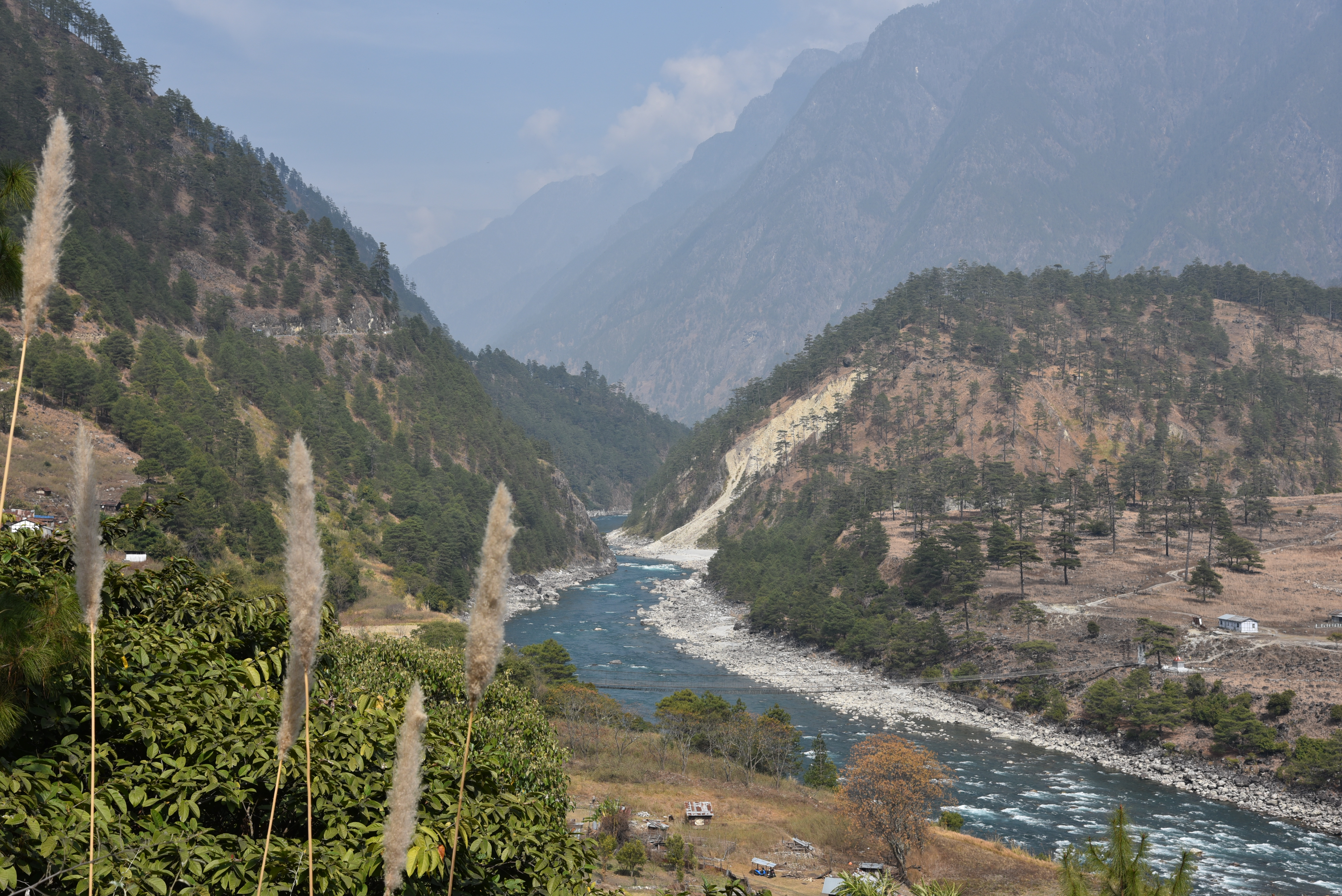
- Scenery between Hawai and Kibithoo

- Location in Arunachal Pradesh, India Hawai (India)
- Coordinates: 27°53′7″N 96°48′37″E
- Country: India
- State: Arunachal Pradesh
- District: Anjaw

Government
  - Type: District Panchayat
  - Body: Hawai zilla panchayat

Population
  - Total: 982
- Demonym: Hawaiwashi

Languages
  - Official: English, Hindi
- Time zone: UTC+5:30 (IST)
- Vehicle registration: AR

Hawai is the district headquarters of Anjaw District (created in 2004) in the state of Arunachal Pradesh in north-east India.

== Location ==
It is located at an altitude of 1296 m above sea level on the banks of the Lohit River, a tributary of the Brahmaputra River.

It is nearly 50 km south of Walong airstrip, 80 km south of India-China LAC (at Kaho), and 120 km southwest of Diphu Pass near India-China-Myanmar tri-junction.

== Etymology ==
"Hawai" in Kaman Mishmi dialect means "Pond". The Mishmi are the main ethnic tribe in Anjaw District.

== Transport ==
The 2,000-kilometre-long (1,200 mi) proposed Mago-Thingbu to Vijaynagar Arunachal Pradesh Frontier Highway along the McMahon Line, (will intersect with the proposed East-West Industrial Corridor Highway) and will pass through this district, alignment map of which can be seen here and here.

== Demographics ==
As per 2011 Indian census, Hawai had a population of 982 of which 625 are males while 357 are females. Population of children with age 0-6 is 83 which is 8.45% of total population of Hawai. Hawai has an average literacy rate of 80.31%, higher than the state average of 65.38% and national average of 74.04%. male literacy rate is around 76.79%, and female literacy rate is 86.90%. The female sex ratio is 571 against state average of 938. Moreover, child sex ratio in Hawai is around 1128 compared to the state average of 972.

=== Religion ===
Others include Sikhism, Jainism & Other religions

Religion in Hawai
| Religion | Percent |
| Hinduism | 87.78% |
| Islam | 8.45% |
| Christianity | 2.44% |
| Buddhism | 1.32% |
| Others | 0.01% |

According to the 2011 census, 87.78% of the population is Hindu, 8.45% Muslim, 2.44% Christian and 1.32% Buddhist.

=== Languages ===
Languages spoken in Hawai Town (2011)
1. Mismi (38.7%)
2. Nepali (16.9%)
3. Bengali (10.5%)
4. Hindi (6.62%)
5. Assamese (6.62%)
6. Others (20.7%)

According to Census 2011, Mishmi is Spoken by 381 people, Nepali at 166 people, Bengali by 103 people, both Hindi and Assamese at 65.

== Media ==
Hawai has an All India Radio Relay station known as Akashvani Hawai. It broadcasts on FM frequencies.

== Banking Facilities ==
The list of banks functioning in Hawai:

- State Bank of India, Hawai

== See also ==
- North-East Frontier Agency
- List of people from Arunachal Pradesh
- Religion in Arunachal Pradesh
- Cuisine of Arunachal Pradesh
- List of institutions of higher education in Arunachal Pradesh
