= Arunachali cuisine =

Culinary tradition

The type of the dishes of the Indian state of Arunachal Pradesh vary within the region, according to tribal influence (with the influence of Apatanis, Chuki, adi and Nishi)

Apo/Apong or rice beer made from fermented rice or millet is a popular beverage in Arunachal Pradesh, as an alcoholic drink. There are different varieties of rice beer with different flavours.

The staple food is rice along with fish, meat (Lukter) and many green vegetables. Different varieties of rice are available. Lettuce is the most common and preferred vegetable of all, prepared by boiling it with ginger, coriander and green chillies and pinch of salt. Boiled rice cakes wrapped in leaves is a famous way of packing the cooked rice. Dishes in eastern districts like Tirap and Changlang have some different method in their way of food preparation.

Many wild herbs and shrubs are also part of the cuisine. Bamboo shoots both dried and fresh are used extensively.

Prior to Indian Independence when British policy to isolate the Hill people NEFA (North-East Frontier Agency) were in effect, wild birds and animals were a big part of their diet, but with modern restrictions on hunting this is no longer the case.
