= Anjaw district =

- District
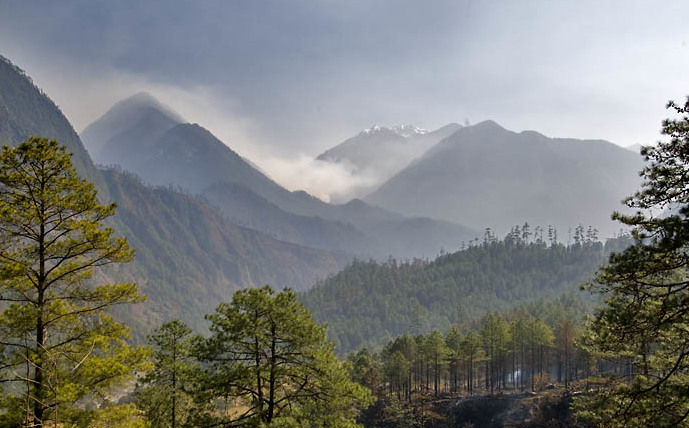
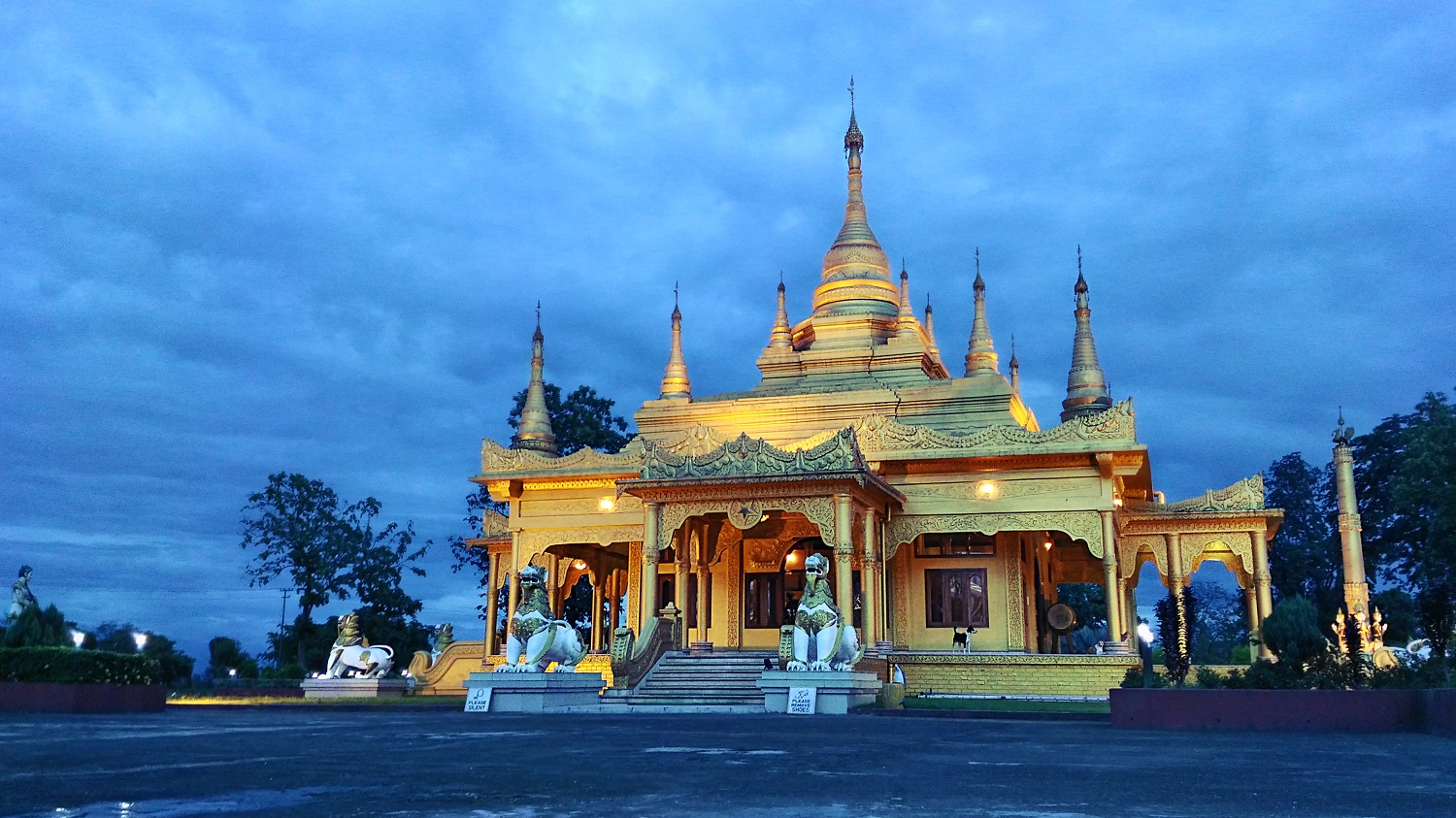
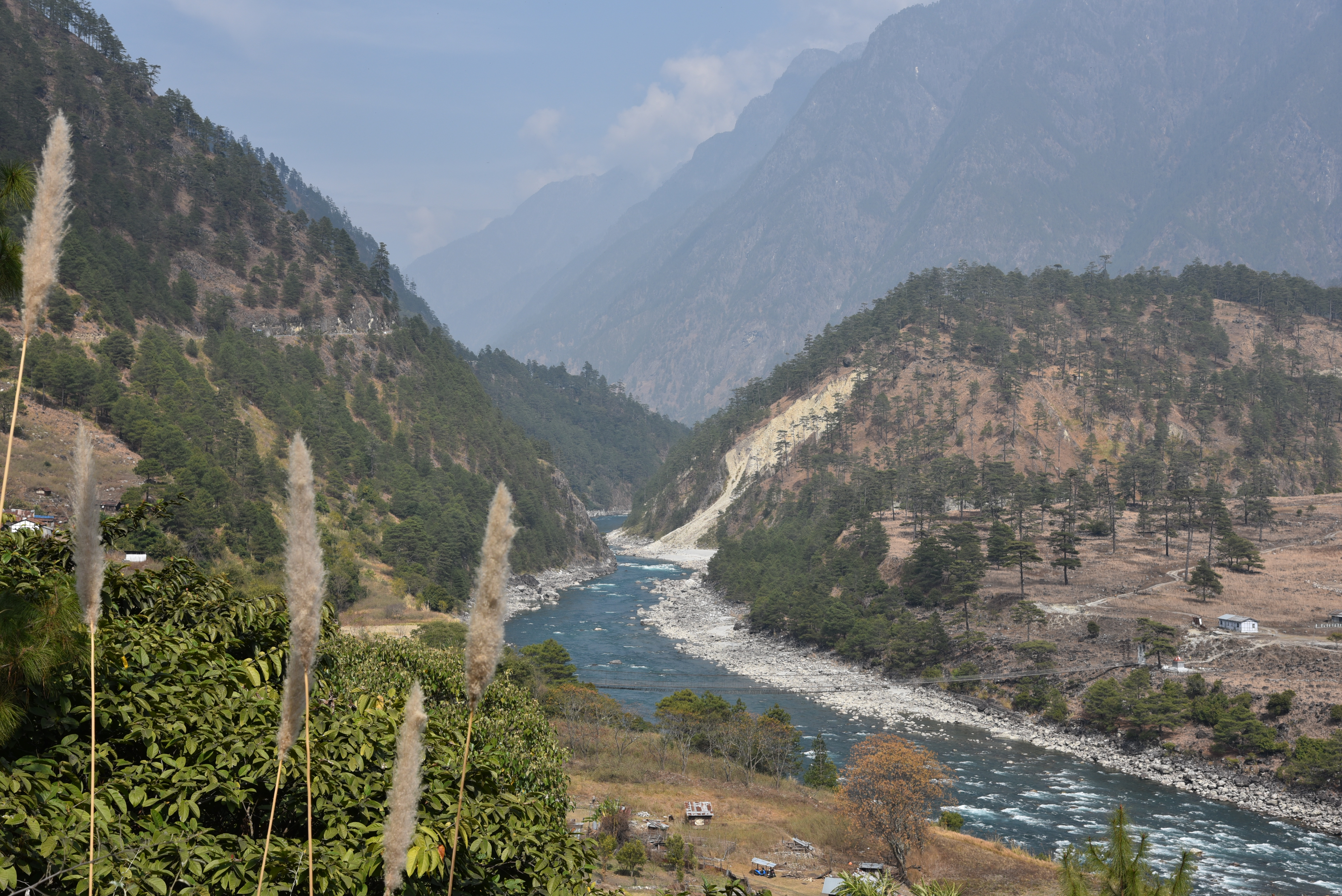
- Lohit river and Kibithu

- Location in Arunachal Pradesh
- Country: India
- State: Arunachal Pradesh
- Headquarters: Hawai

Government
  - Lok Sabha constituencies: Arunachal East
  - Vidhan Sabha constituencies: Hayuliang

Area
  - Total: 6,190 km^{2} (2,390 sq mi)

Population (2011)
  - Total: 21,167
  - Density: 3.42/km^{2} (8.86/sq mi)

Demographics
  - Literacy: 59.4%
  - Sex ratio: 805
- Time zone: UTC+05:30 (IST)
- Website: anjaw.nic.in

Anjaw district (/ˈændʒɔː/) is an administrative district in the state of Arunachal Pradesh in north-east India. It was created as a district in 2004, by splitting off from the Lohit district under the Arunachal Pradesh Re-organization of Districts Amendment Act. The district borders Tibet on the north. Hawai, at an altitude of 1296 m above sea level, is the district headquarters, located on the banks of the Lohit River, a tributary of the Brahmaputra River. Anjaw is the easternmost district in India. The furthest villages towards the border with Tibet are Dong, Walong, Kibithu and Kaho.

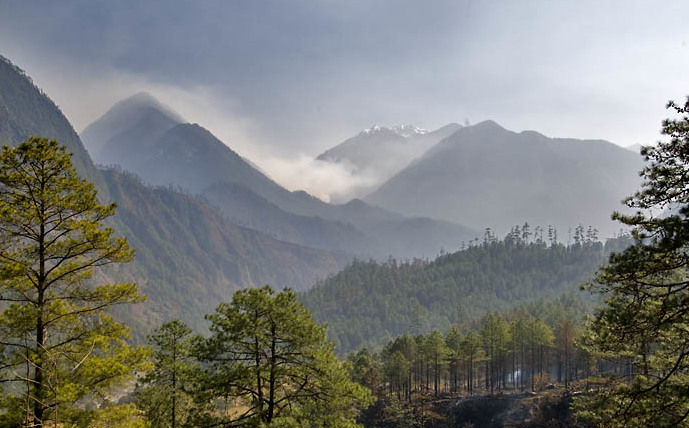
Landscape of Anjaw

Anjaw is the second least populous district in India (out of 640).

== History ==
During the 1962 Sino-Indian War, parts of Anjaw were briefly occupied by China. Being a disputed border region, Indian military has always been present in the Anjaw district. During the 2020 China–India skirmishes additional troops were deployed to the region.

== Geography ==
=== Rivers ===
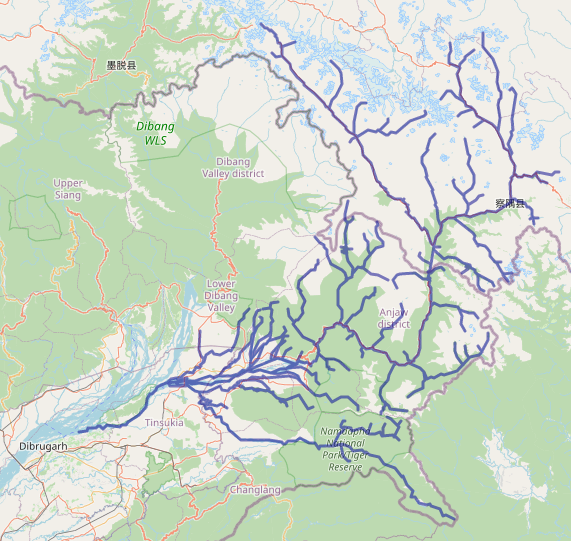
Lohit River Basin

The main rivers are the following:

- Lohit River (called Talu by local Mishmis)
- Lam River
- Tidding River
- Delei River
- Krowti River
- Dichu River
- Lati River
- Klung River
- Dav River
- Telua River
- Ampani River
- Sarti River
- Yepak river

== Transport ==
The 2,000-kilometre-long (1,200 mi) proposed Mago-Thingbu to Vijaynagar Arunachal Pradesh Frontier Highway along the McMahon Line will intersect with the proposed East-West Industrial Corridor Highway and pass through this district, alignment map of which can be seen here and here.

== Economy ==
=== Agriculture ===
The main crops are maize, millet, rice, beans, cardamom, orange, pears, plum, and apple.

== Divisions ==
There is one Arunachal Pradesh Legislative Assembly constituency located in this district: Hayuliang. It is part of the Arunachal East Lok Sabha constituency.

The district has seven subdistricts called "circles":

- Hayuliang
- Goiliang
- Chaglagam
- Manchal
- Hawai
- Walong
- Kibithoo

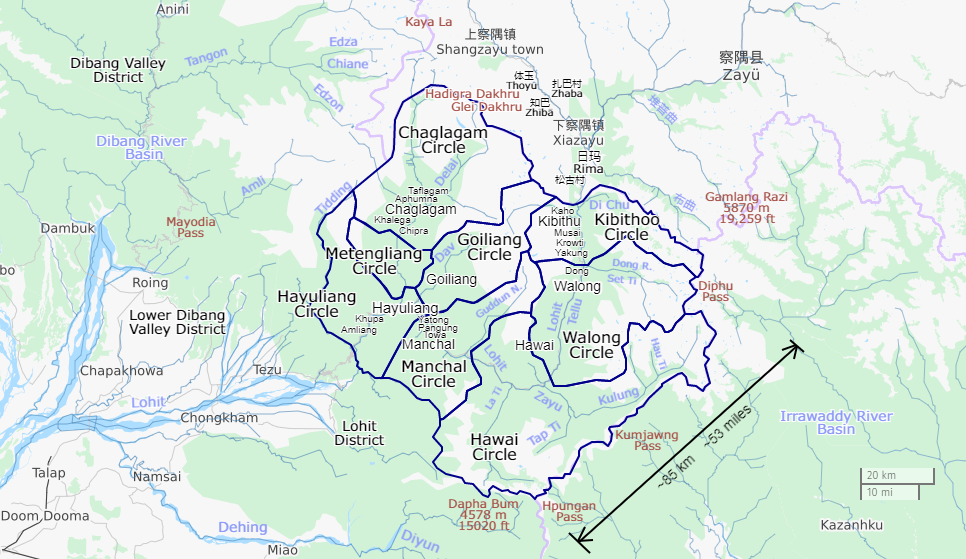
Anjaw district

== Demographics ==
According to the 2011 census Anjaw district has a population of 21,167, roughly equal to the nation of Palau. This gives it a ranking of 639th in India (out of a total of 640). The district has a population density of 3 inhabitants per square kilometre (7.8/sq mi). Its population growth rate over the decade 2001–2011 was 13.77%. Anjaw has a sex ratio of 805 females for every 1000 males, and a literacy rate of 59.4%.

=== Tribes ===
The Mishmi, and the Zakhring (formerly called Meyor) are the main tribes in the district.

Tribal population is 16,451 (77.72%) as per the 2011 census, with the largest tribes being Idu/Taraon Mishmi (9,991), Kaman/Miju Mishmi (5,021), Degaru Mishmi (472), and Meyor (472).

=== Languages ===
Languages of Anjaw (2011)
1. Mishmi (72.3%)
2. Hindi (7.03%)
3. Nepali (5.27%)
4. Tibetan (2.28%)
5. Bengali (2.13%)
6. Punjabi (1.54%)
7. Assamese (1.35%)
8. Dogri (1.16%)
9. Adi (0.89%)
10. Odia (0.89%)
11. Mizo (0.87%)
12. Others (4.25%)

=== Religion ===
Religion in Anjaw district (2011)
Religion	Per cent
Hinduism	61.83%
Donyi Polo	30.75%
Islam	3.09%
Buddhism	3.04%
Christianity	1.28%

Hinduism is the majority faith in the district, followed by majority of the tribals and non-tribals.

Among the tribals, major religions were Hinduism (57.67%) and Native faith (37.07%). And among the non-tribals, the composition is Hinduism (76.36%), Islam (10.43%), Sikh (5.66%), Christian (3.54%), and Buddhism (2.65%).

== Flora and fauna ==
The district is rich in wildlife. Rare mammals such as Mishmi takin (Miju: gheyam), Red goral, Gongshan muntjac, Leaf muntjac occurs while among birds there is the rare Sclater's monal (Miju: mankree). A pine, Pinus merkusii (Miju: Rok Sak) is found only in this district in the entire northeastern India. A flying squirrel, new to science has also its range in this district. It has been named as Mishmi Hills Giant Flying Squirrel, Petaurista mishmiensis. Recently scientists found a new mammal species white cheek macaque.. it was first found in China in 2015 but its presence in India being noted recently. The discovery increased the total count of mammals in india to 438.

== Banking facilities ==
The list of banks functioning in Anjaw:

- State Bank of India, Hawai
- State Bank of India, Hayuliang Branch
