= North-East Frontier Agency =

Former political division of India (1914–1972)

North-East Frontier Agency North-East Frontier Tracts NEFA
- Political division administered by the Government of India
- 1914–1972
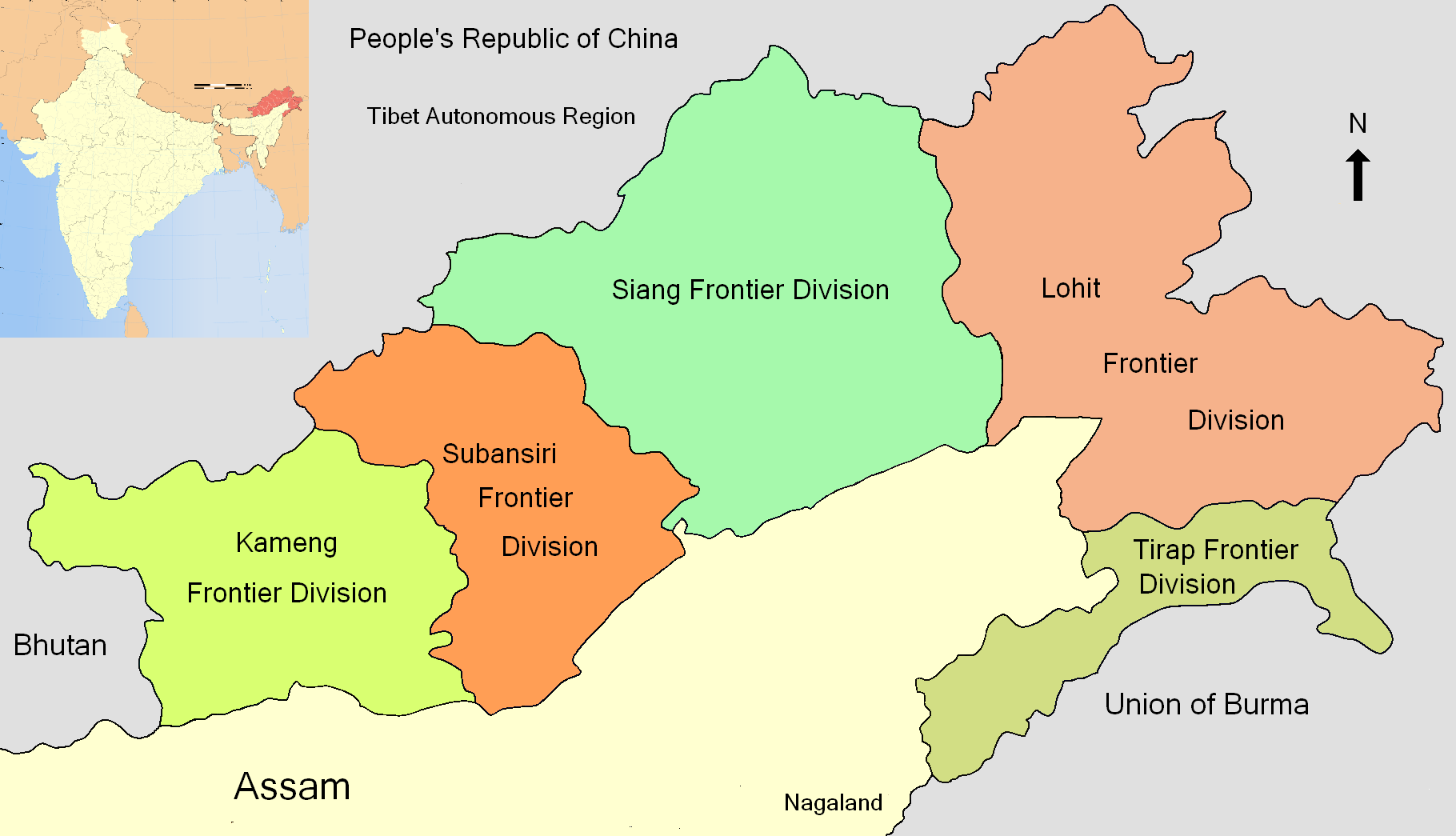
- North-East Frontier Agency in 1963
- Capital: Shillong
- Population
  - 1971: 467,511
- Historical era: British Raj / Cold War
  - North-East Frontier Tracts established: 1914
  - Reorganised as North-East Frontier Agency: 1954
  - Union Territory established: 21 January 1972
Preceded by	Succeeded by
Assam Province	Arunachal Pradesh (union territory)
- Today part of: Arunachal Pradesh

North-East Frontier Agency (NEFA), originally known as the North-East Frontier Tracts (NEFT), was a political division of British India and later the Republic of India. It was administered by the Government of India through the Governor of Assam and had its administrative headquarters at Shillong.

Following India's independence in 1947, the North-East Frontier Tracts remained part of Assam until they were reorganised as the North-East Frontier Agency in 1954. Under the provisions of the North-Eastern Areas (Reorganisation) Act, 1971, NEFA was replaced by the Union Territory of Arunachal Pradesh on 21 January 1972. The Union Territory continued to be administered from Shillong until the capital was shifted to Itanagar in 1974. Arunachal Pradesh attained full statehood on 20 February 1987.

== History ==
=== Tracts (1914–1954) ===
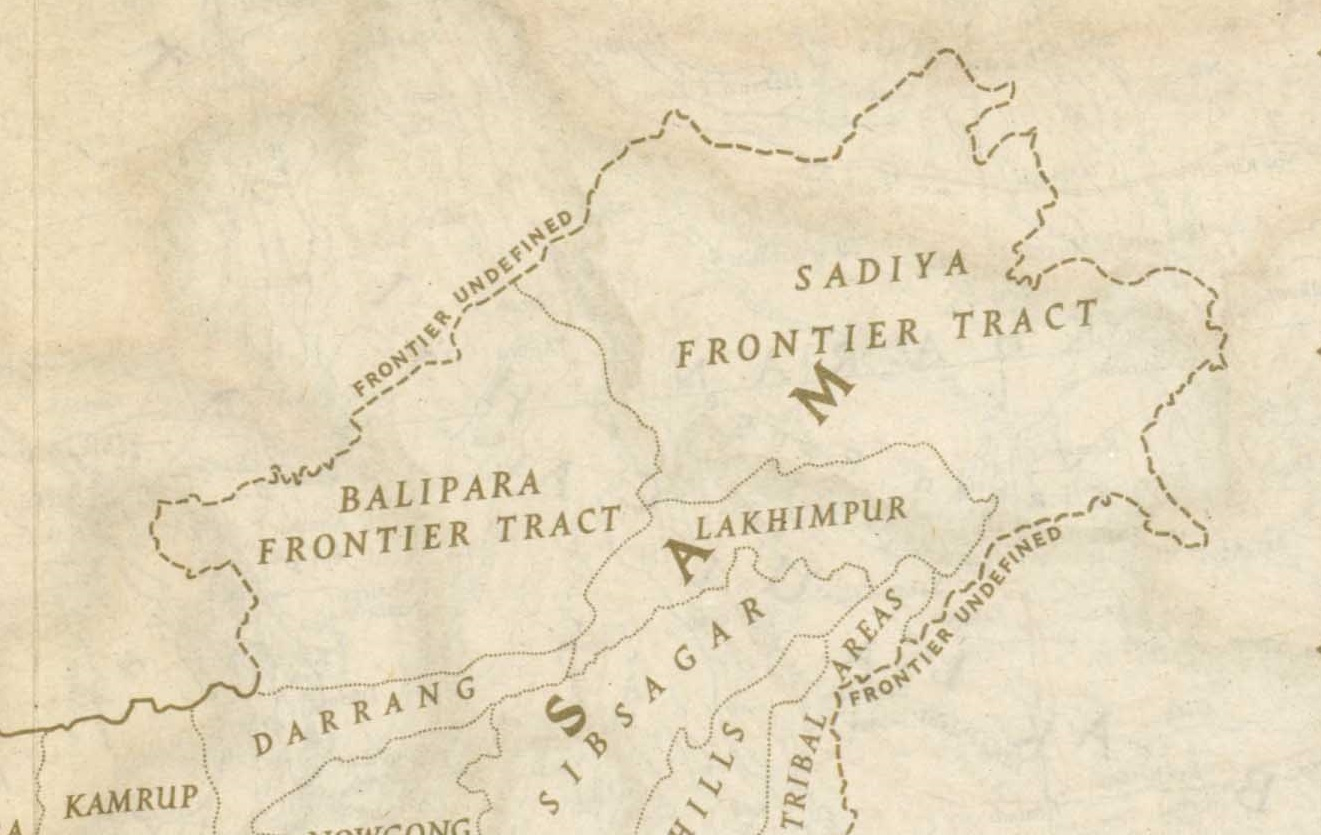
North-East Frontier Tracts in 1946

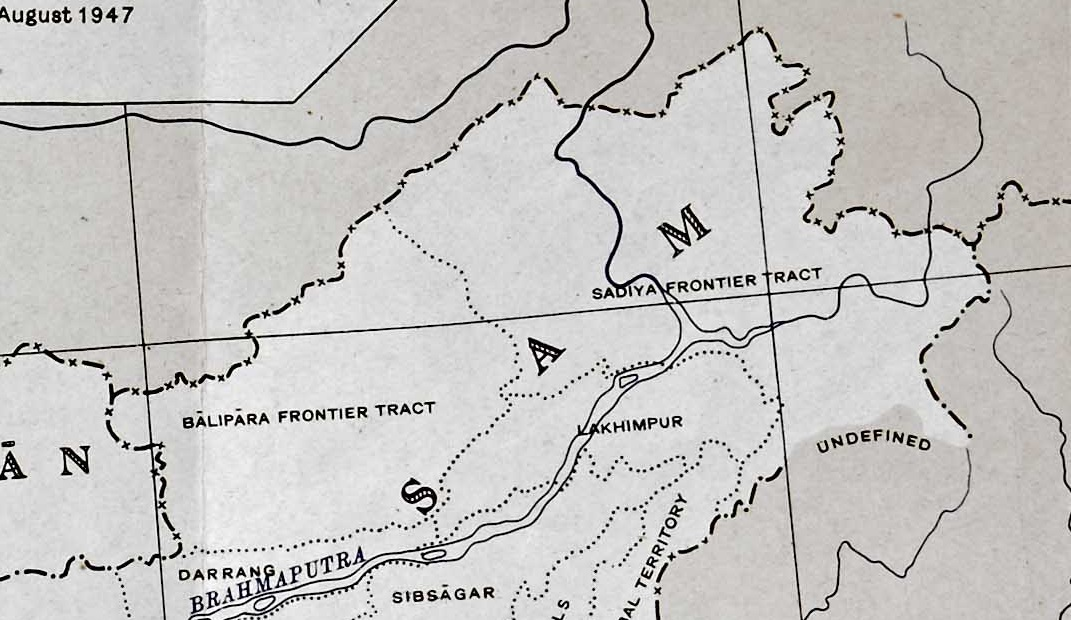
The North-East Frontier in the first political map of independent India, 1947

In 1914, some tribal-majority areas were separated from the former Darrang and Lakhimpur districts of Assam Province of British India to form the North-East Frontier Tract (NEFT). The NEFT was initially divided into two sections: (i) the Central and Eastern Section (made up of the former Dibrugarh Frontier Tract (created in 1884) and some more areas in the South) and (ii) the Western Section. Each section was placed under a political officer. In 1919, the Central and Eastern Section was renamed the Sadiya Frontier Tract, and the Western Section was renamed the Balipara Frontier Tract. In 1937, Sadiya and Balipara Frontier Tracts along with the Lakhimpur Frontier Tract (also created in 1919) of Assam Province came to be known collectively as the 'Excluded Areas of Province of Assam' under the provisions of the Government of India Act, 1935. By Regulation 1 of The North Eastern Frontier Tracts (Internal Administration) Regulations 1943, Tirap Frontier Tract was created by amalgamating certain areas of Sadiya and Lakhimpur Frontier Tracts.

After this, a new regulation – The Assam Frontier (Administration of Justice) Regulation, 1945 – was made by the Governor of Assam using his powers under Section 92(2) of the Government of India Act, 1935. This proved to be a landmark step in the history of NEFA which later emerged as the state of Arunachal Pradesh. In 1946, Balipara Frontier Tract was divided into two administrative units: Sela Sub-Agency and Subansiri Area.

After the independence of India in 1947, NEFT became a part of the Assam state.

In 1948, Sadiya Frontier Tract was bifurcated into two districts: Abor Hills district and Mishmi Hills district. In 1950, the plain portions of these tracts, (Balipara Frontier Tract, Tirap Frontier Tract, Abor Hills district, and Mishmi Hills district) were transferred to the Assam state government and the rest became one of the Tribal Areas in Assam state (under part-B of the table appended to paragraph 20 of the sixth schedule of the Indian constitution). In 1951, Balipara Frontier Tract, Tirap Frontier Tract, Abor Hills district, Mishmi Hills district and the Naga tribal areas were together renamed as the North-East Frontier Agency (NEFA).

=== Agency (1954–1972) ===
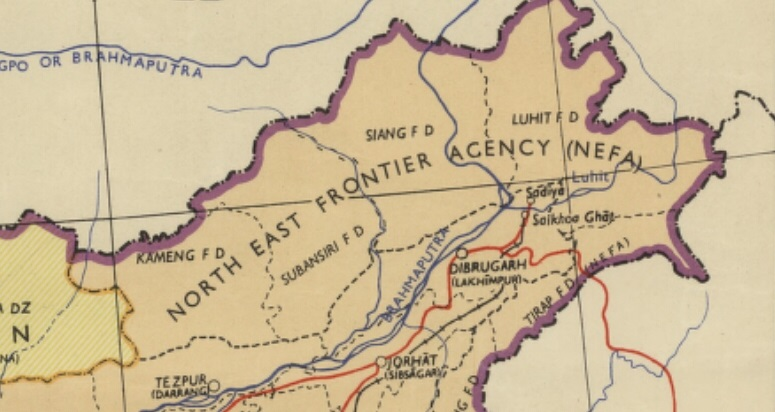
Divisions of the North-East Frontier Agency in 1954

In 1954, the Balipara Frontier Tract was bifurcated into (1) Kameng Frontier Division, and (2) Subansiri Frontier Division; (3) Tirap Frontier Tract was renamed Tirap Frontier Division. (4) Abor Hill’s District was renamed Siang Frontier Division and (5) Mishmi Hills District was renamed Lohit Frontier Division. A Naga tribal area was formed into the Tuensang Frontier Division, which was, in 1957, joined to the Naga Hills district to form the union territory of Naga Hills Tuensang Area. The remaining territory was collectively known as North-East Frontier Agency (NEFA).

On 1 August 1965, the administration of the agency was transferred from the Ministry of External Affairs to the Ministry of Home Affairs. On 1 December 1965, the five frontier divisions (Kameng, Subansiri, Siang, Lohit, and Tirap) became its five districts. A deputy commissioner was appointed as the administrative head of each district in place of a political officer. In 1967, an Agency Council was constituted for better administration. Until 1972, it was constitutionally a part of the Assam state and was directly administered by the Governor of Assam as an agent of the President of India. On 21 January 1972, the North-East Frontier Agency became the Union Territory of Arunachal Pradesh and was placed under the charge of a Chief Commissioner.
