= Charles Alfred Bell =

British civil servant (1870–1945)

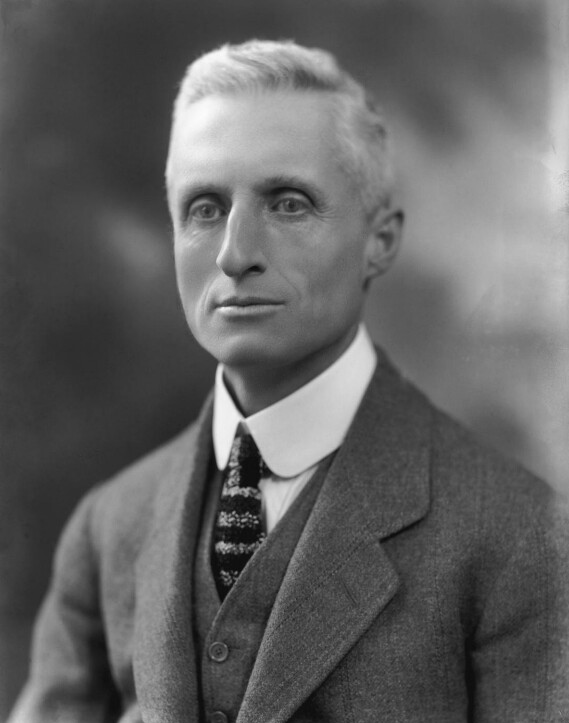
- Bell in 1922
- Born: 31 October 1870; Fort William, Calcutta, Bengal Presidency, British Raj
- Died: 8 March 1945 (aged 74); Victoria, British Columbia, Canada
- Education: New College, Oxford (didn't graduate)
- Occupations: diplomat, writer, Tibetologist

Sir Charles Alfred Bell KCIE CMG (31 October 1870 – 8 March 1945) was the British Political Officer for Bhutan, Sikkim and Tibet. He was known as "British India's ambassador to Tibet" before retiring and becoming a noted tibetologist.

== Biography ==
Bell was born on 31 October 1870 in Fort William, Calcutta (present-day Kolkata) to Henry Bell, a civil servant in the Indian Service (ICS), and Anne Bell (née Dumbell). Educated at Winchester College, Bell passed the ICS test in 1889. Subsequently studying at New College, Oxford, Bell joined the ICS in 1891. Settling in the Bengal Presidency, he served posts Bihar and Orissa (present-day Odisha).

Transferring to Darjeeling in 1900, Bell first came into contact with Tibetan culture and language. His English-Tibetan colloquial dictionary was first published in 1905 together with a grammar of colloquial Tibetan as Manual of Colloquial Tibetan.

In 1908, he was appointed Political Officer in Sikkim. He soon became very influential in Sikkimese and Bhutanese politics, and in 1910 he met the 13th Dalai Lama, who had been forced into temporary exile by the Chinese. He got to know him quite well, and later wrote his biography (Portrait of the Dalai Lama, published in 1946).

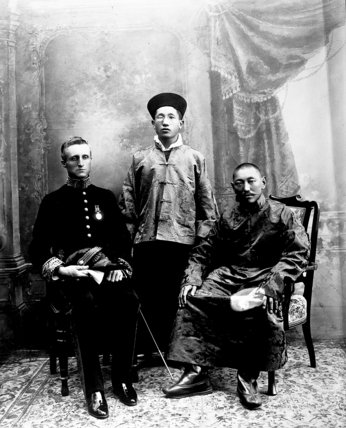
The 13th Dalai Lama (right), Sir Charles Bell (left), and Maharaj Kumar Sidkeong Tulku (centre) in Calcutta around March 1910.

In 1913 he participated in the Simla Convention, a treaty between Great Britain, China and Tibet concerning the status of Tibet. Before the summit, he met in Gyantse with Paljor Dorje Shatra, the Tibetan representative to the British Raj at Darjeeling and advised him to bring to Simla with him all documents concerning relations between China and Tibet, as well as Tibetan claims to land occupied by China. Bell was designated to assist the Tibetans in the negotiations, with Archibald Rose assigned to be his counterpart for the Chinese. He was appointed a Companion of the Order of St Michael and St George (CMG) in the 1915 New Year Honours for his services.

In 1919 he resigned as Britain's political officer in Sikkim to devote himself full-time to his research. However, London sent him to Lhasa in 1920 as a special ambassador. During this time, he was assisted by Rabden Lepcha who contributed to his photographic collection during over 18 years.

After travelling through Tibet and visiting Lhasa in 1920, he retired to Oxford, where he wrote a series of books on the history, culture and religion of Tibet. He was awarded a knighthood for his Lhasa Mission in 1922.

Palhese, Bell's Tibetan friend and confidant travelled to England in 1927–28 to assist him in editing several of these books.

He moved to Canada in his later years. The book Portrait of the Dalai Lama was completed only a few days before his death on 8 March 1945. Some of the photographs that he took in Tibet can be found in the Pitt Rivers Museum in Oxford. Some of these were included in the 1997 book Tibet: Caught in Time.

== Works ==
- Manual of Colloquial Tibetan. Calcutta: Baptist Mission Press, 1905. (Part II, English-Tibetan vocabulary; later editions 1919 and 1939)
- Portrait of a Dalai Lama: the Life and Times of the Great Thirteenth by Charles Alfred Bell, Sir Charles Bell, Publisher: Wisdom Publications (MA), January 1987, ISBN 978-0-86171-055-3 (first published as Portrait of the Dalai Lama: London: Collins, 1946).
- Tibet: Past and Present. Oxford: Clarendon Press, 1924
- The People of Tibet. Oxford: Clarendon Press, 1928
- The Religion of Tibet. Oxford: Clarendon Press, 1931
- Tibet: Caught in Time. Reading: Garnet, 1997. Contains photographs by Charles Bell and John Claude White
