= Simla Accord =

Simla Accord may refer to

- Simla Convention, signed in 1914, to purported to settle a dispute over the boundary line between inner and outer Tibet.
- Simla Agreement, signed between India and Pakistan in July 1972, it followed the 1971 Bangladesh Liberation War and the Indo-Pakistani war of 1971
