= Paljor Dorje Shatra =

Tibetan politician

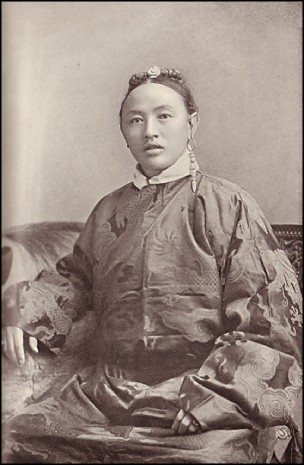
- A photo of Paljor Dorje Shatra, Reproduced in Laurence Waddell's "Lhasa and Its Mysteries-With a Record of the British Tibetan Expedition of 1903-1904", 1905.)

Lönchen of Tibet
- In office 1907–1919 Serving with Chankhyim Trekhang Thupten Shakya, Sholkhang Dhondup Phuntsog
- Monarch: 13th Dalai Lama

Kalön of Tibet
- In office 1893–1903
- Monarch: 13th Dalai Lama

Personal details
- Born: c. 1860 Tibet, Qing Empire
- Died: c. 1923/1926
- Relations: Shatra Phuntsog Dorje (wife); Shasur Gyurme Sonam Topgyal (step-son)
- Occupation: politician, diplomat

Longchen Shatra Paljor Dorje (Tibetan: བཤད་སྒྲ་དཔལ་འབྱོར་རྡོ་རྗེ, Wylie: bshad sgra dpal vbyor rdo rje), commonly known as Shatra (c. 1860 – c. 1923/1926), was a Tibetan politician.

== Family ==
Shatra belonged originally to the Shangga family. He married, however, into the Shatra family, took their name and was a wealthy man. Shatra's son is the former Kalon (Religion Minister) Shasur Gyurme Sonam Topgyal, also known as Shenkhawa.

== Career ==
In 1890 he accompanied the Chinese amban on his trip to Darjeeling and supported him during the negotiations leading to the Anglo-Chinese border treaty. Shortly afterwards he was appointed Shappe (Minister).

In 1903, he and the other three members of the inner cabinet (Kashag) were accused of treason by the Tsongdu for conspiring with the British. Conversely, however, the British accused him of conspiring with the Russians because of his cooperation with Agvan Dorzhiev. The result of the accusation of the Tsongdu led to the 13th Dalai Lama deposing and banished him to his estate in Orong Kongbu (eastern Tibet). In 1915 the British reported that he had been alternately pro-Russian and pro-Chinese, but in around 1915 gained a strong anti-Chinese and pro-British attitude.

In 1907, when the Dalai Lama fled Tibet, he was recalled to Lhasa by vice-amban Zhang Yingtang and was appointed advisor to the parliament. His function was similar to a prime minister and he shared it with two other Kalon Tripa's, Changkhyim and Sholkhang. In 1915 the British reported that Shatra was the highest of the three Lönchens.

When the Dalai Lama returned to Lhasa, he won his confidence back. In 1908 he created the office of Lönchen for the three prime ministers. In 1910 he accompanied the Dalai Lama during his trip to British India.

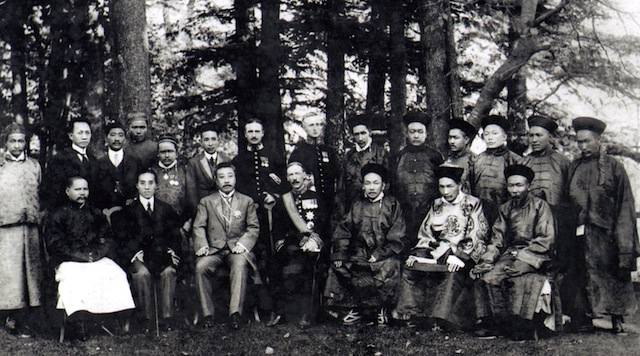
Simla Treaty Conference, October 1913. Rear, middle, left is Archibald Rose and to the right Charles Bell. Front, left to right is Wangchuk Tsering, Chinese Delegates B. D. Bruce, Ivan Chen, Sir McMahon, Tibetan Delegates Longchen Shatra, Trimon and Tenpa Dhargay (known as the Dronyer Chenmo)

The revolt of 1911 ushered in an era of several decades of independence, he boosted the protesters morale. In 1913-14 he took part in the Simla Convention.

== Reputation ==
He was known as a progressive politician and supporter of reform in Tibet. He had a strong character and a friendly way of dealing.

Sir Charles Bell described Shatra as follows: "He showed people skills and a political power that surprised many at the conference. His simple dignity and charming way of doing things made him beloved by all who knew him in Simla and Delhi".
