= McMahon Line =

Boundary between the Tibetan region of China and India

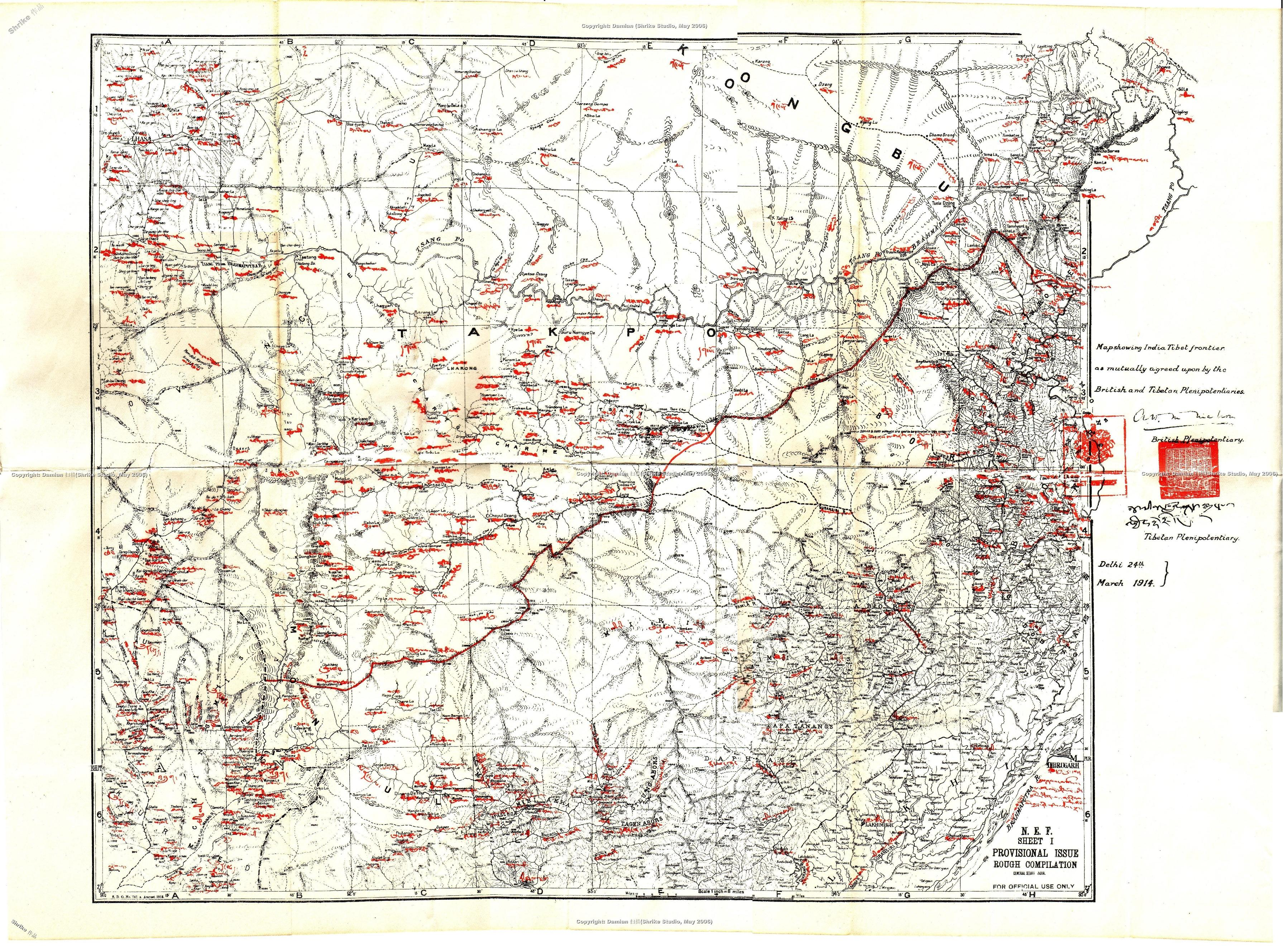
The western portion of the McMahon line drawn on Map 1, that was shared by the British and the Tibetan delegates at the Simla Conference, 1914

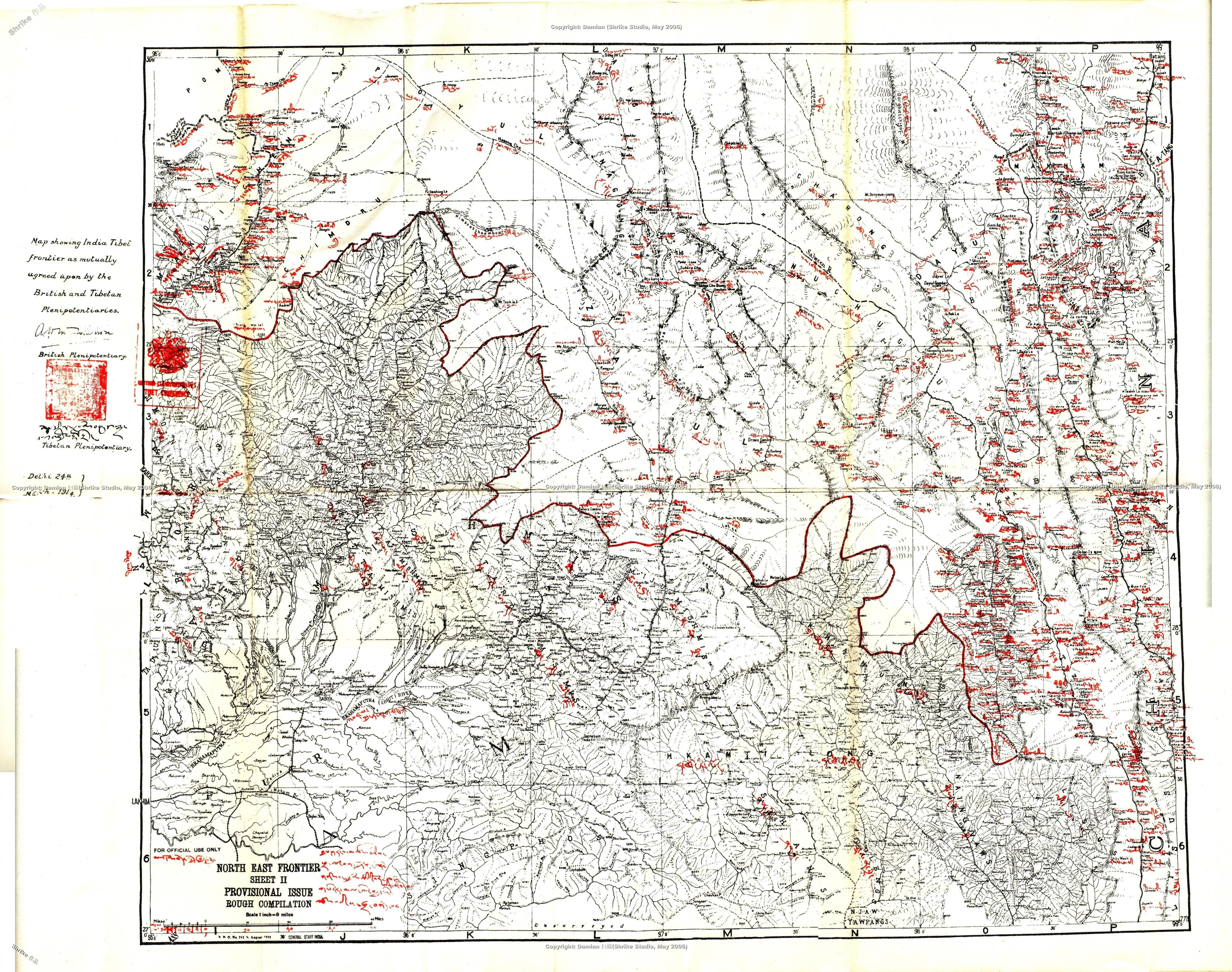
The eastern portion of the McMahon line drawn on Map 2, that was shared by the British and the Tibetan delegates at the Simla Conference, 1914

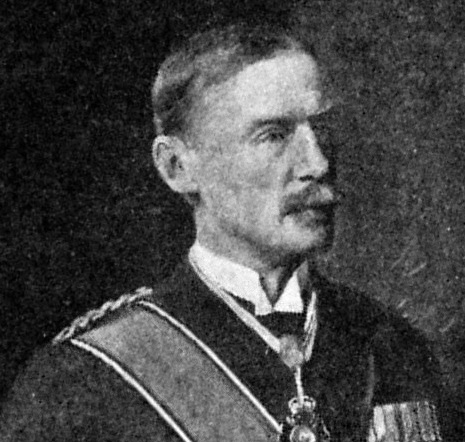
Henry McMahon

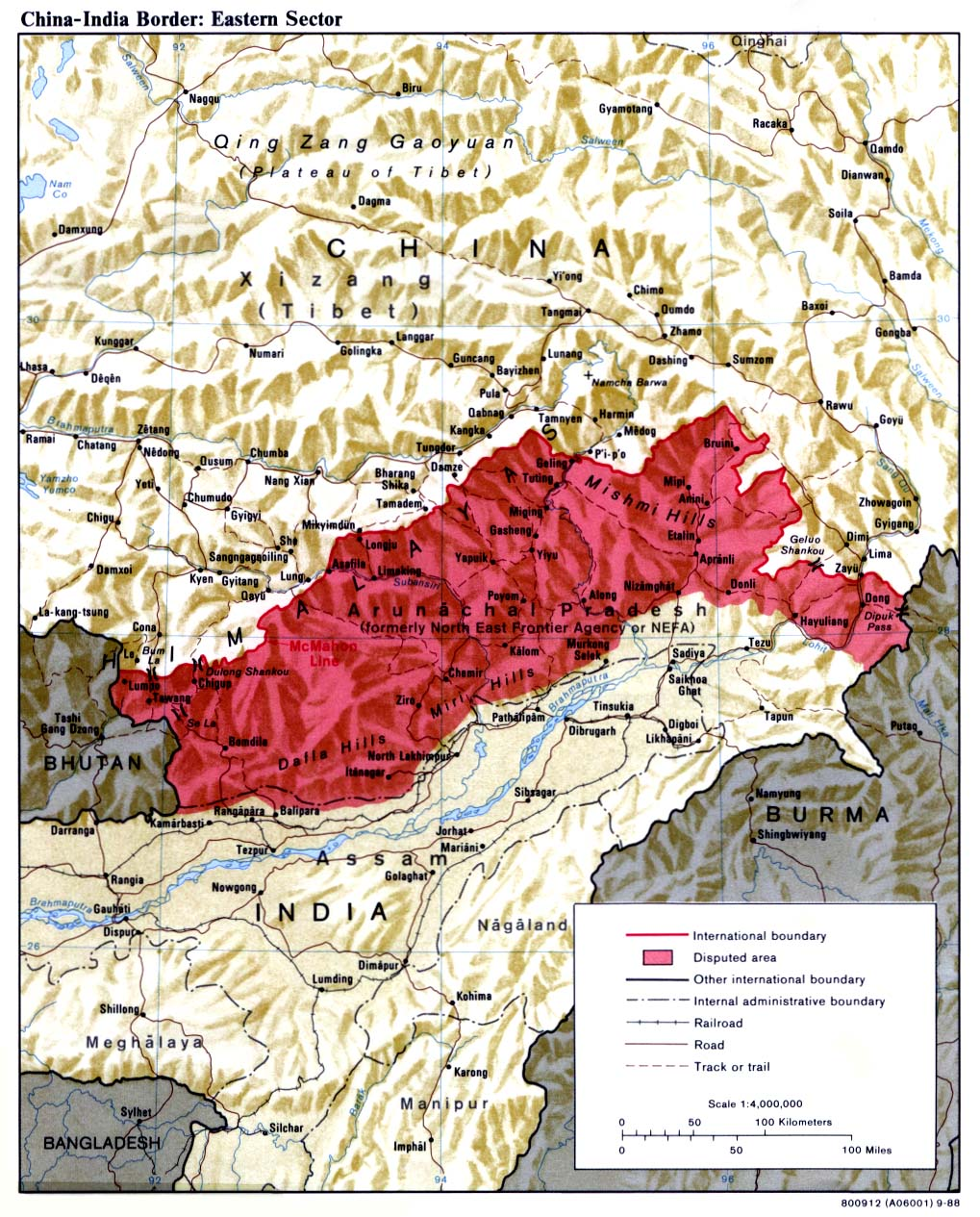
The McMahon Line forms the basis of the Line of Actual Control and the northern boundary of Arunachal Pradesh (shown in red) in the eastern Himalayas administered by India but claimed by China. The area was the eastern sector of the 1962 Sino-Indian War.

The McMahon Line is the boundary between Tibet and British India as agreed in the maps and notes exchanged by the respective plenipotentiaries on 24–25 March 1914 at Delhi, as part of the 1914 Simla Convention. The line delimited the respective spheres of influence of the two countries in the eastern Himalayan region along northeast India and northern Burma (Myanmar), which were earlier undefined. (Note: It is significant that the term "spheres" (of influence) was used. It underscores the fact that the majority of the Assam Himalayan territory was under the control of neither country at that time.) The Republic of China was not a party to the McMahon Line agreement, but the line was part of the overall boundary of Tibet defined in the Simla Convention, initialled by all three parties and later repudiated by the government of China. (Note: Whether the Chinese repudiation amounts to a rejection of the McMahon Line is debated by scholars.) The Indian part of the Line currently serves as the de facto boundary between China and India, although its legal status is disputed by the People's Republic of China. The Burmese part of the Line was renegotiated by the People's Republic of China and Myanmar.

The line is named after Henry McMahon, foreign secretary of British India and the chief British negotiator of the conference at Simla. The bilateral agreement between Tibet and Britain was signed by McMahon on behalf of the British government and Lonchen Shatra on behalf of the Tibetan government. It spans 890 kilometres (550 miles) from the corner of Bhutan to the Isu Razi Pass on the Burma border, largely along the crest of the Himalayas.

The outcomes of the Simla Conference remained ambiguous for several decades because China did not sign the overall Convention but the British were hopeful of persuading the Chinese. The Convention and the McMahon's agreement were omitted in the 1928 edition of Aitchison's Treaties. It was revived in 1935 by Olaf Caroe, then deputy foreign secretary of British India, who obtained London's permission to implement it as well as to publish a revised version of Aitchison's 1928 Treaties. (Note: The revised volume of Aitchison's Treaties still carried the original 1929 date, giving rise to allegations of malpractice by later commentators.) Since then the McMahon Line has been part of the legal national border of India.

China rejects the Simla Convention and the McMahon Line, contending that Tibet was not a sovereign state and therefore did not have the power to conclude treaties. However China recognizes the line as part of the Line of Actual Control between the two countries, according to a 1959 diplomatic note by Prime Minister Zhou Enlai. Chinese maps show some 65,000 km^{2} (25,000 sq mi) of the territory south of the line as part of the Tibet Autonomous Region, known as South Tibet in China. Chinese forces briefly occupied a part of this area during the Sino-Indian War of 1962 and later withdrew.

The 14th Dalai Lama did not originally recognise India's sovereignty over Arunachal Pradesh. As late as 2003, he said that "Arunachal Pradesh was actually part of Tibet". In January 2007, however, he said that both the Tibetan government and Britain recognized the McMahon Line in 1914. In June 2008, he explicitly recognized for the first time that "Arunachal Pradesh was a part of India under the agreement signed by Tibetan and British representatives".

== Background ==
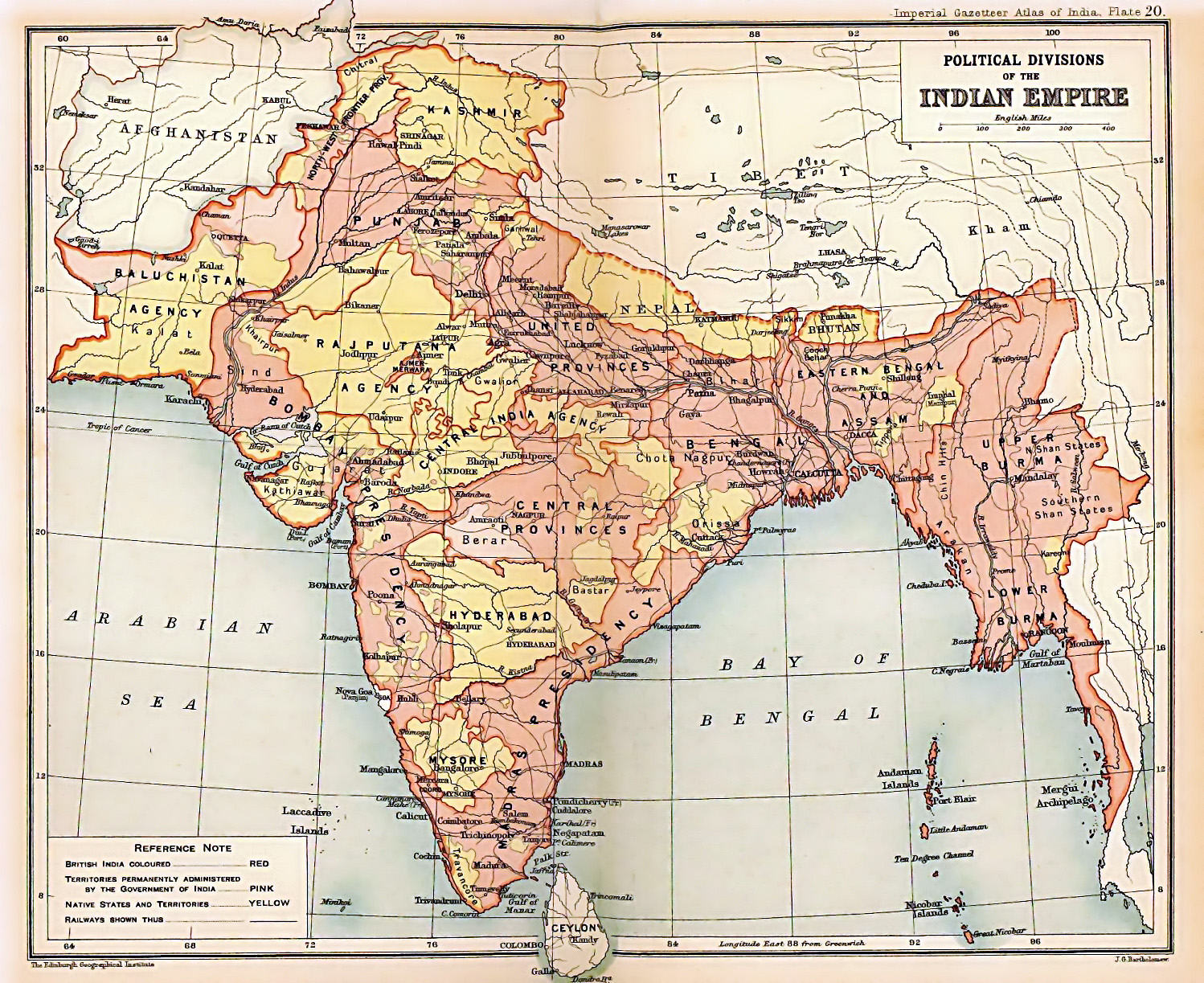
Map of the British Indian Empire from the Imperial Gazetteer of India, 1909 showing the Outer Line as the border of Assam. (Note: In a report to the Government of India in 1903 the Chief Commissioner of Assam, while pointing out the imprecision of the boundary, notes that the boundary and the "outer line" ran along the foot of the hills.)

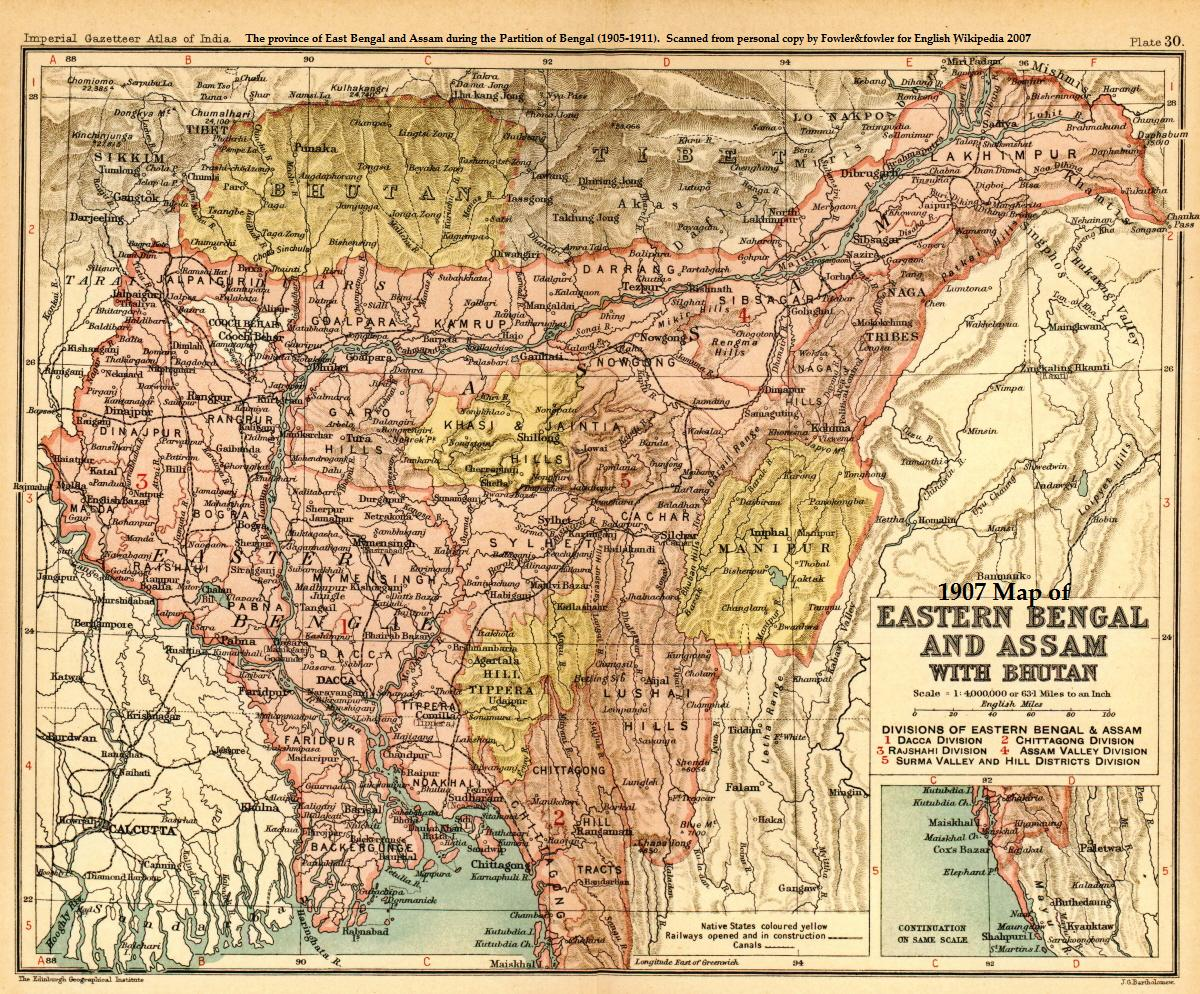
1907 map of East Bengal and Assam from the Imperial Gazetteer of India showing the Outer Line as the border

British India expanded east of Bhutan in the early 19th century with the First Anglo-Burmese War. At the end of the war, the Brahmaputra valley of Assam came under its control, and over the next few decades, under its direct administration. The thickly forested hill tracts surrounding the valley, constituting the present-day Arunachal Pradesh, were inhabited by tribal people, who were not easily amenable to British administrative control. The British were content to leave them alone. In 1873, the British drew an "Inner Line" as an administrative line between the directly-administered territory and the tribal territory, and British subjects were prohibited from passing into the latter without explicit permission.

The British boundary, also called the "Outer Line", was defined to mark the limits of British jurisdiction. But it was not significantly different from the Inner Line in this region.

The British wanted peaceful relations with the Himalayan tribes who lived beyond the Inner Line. However, British influence was nevertheless extended to many regions, through treaties, trade relations, and occasional punitive expeditions in response to "outrages" committed against British civilians. There is evidence that the British regarded the Assam Himalayan region as a geographical part of India irrespective of political jurisdiction. Guyot-Réchard sees them as having extended "external sovereignty" over the Assam Himalayan tribes.

=== Forward policies of early 1900s ===
By 1900, Chinese influence over Tibet had significantly weakened and the British became apprehensive that Tibet would fall into a Russian orbit. In an effort to preclude Russian influence over Tibet and to enforce their treaty rights, the British launched an expedition to Tibet in 1904, which resulted in the Convention of Lhasa between Tibet and Britain.

Qing China became apprehensive about British inroads into Tibet and responded with its own forward policy. They took complete control over the southeastern Kham region of Tibet (also referred to as the "March Country"), through which passed the Chinese communications to Tibet. An assistant amban (imperial resident) was appointed for Chamdo in western Kham to implement the new strategy. Over a period of three years, 1908–1911, the amban Zhao Erfeng implemented brutal policies of subjugation and sinification in the Kham region, for which he earned the nickname of "Zhao the Butcher" (Chinese: 趙屠戶).

Zhao Erfeng's campaigns entered the Tibetan districts adjoining the Assam Himalayan region such as Zayul, Pomed (Bome County) and Pemako (Medog County). They also encroached into parts of the adjoining tribal territory and attempted to exert influence. This alarmed British officials in the region, who advocated the extension of British jurisdiction into tribal territory. The higher administration of British India was initially reluctant to concede these demands, but, by 1912, the Army General Staff had proposed drawing a boundary along the crest of Himalayas. The British appear to have been clear that they were only extending the political administration of their rule but not the geographical extent of India, which was taken to include the Assam Himalayan region.

=== Tawang tract ===
The Tawang Tract forms a core geopolitical dispute regarding the McMahon Line, a 550-mile border drawn by British administrator Sir Henry McMahon at the 1914 Simla Convention. While British India and Tibet agreed to this boundary—effectively placing the strategically vital, Monpa-inhabited Tawang region under British jurisdiction—China's representatives rejected the treaty, a stance the People's Republic of China maintains today. Consequently, China refuses to recognize the McMahon Line, claiming the entire Tawang Tract as part of "South Tibet" (Zangnan) on historical grounds of Tibetan administrative influence prior to 1914. This conflicting interpretation culminated in the 1962 Sino-Indian War, during which Chinese forces briefly occupied Tawang before withdrawing behind the Line. Today, India administers the tract as a district of Arunachal Pradesh along the Line of Actual Control (LAC), while it remains one of the most heavily militarized and contested flashpoints in the Sino-Indian border dispute.

== Drawing the line ==
In 1913, British officials met in Simla, to discuss the status of Tibet. The conference was attended by representatives of Britain, China, and Tibet. "Outer Tibet", covering approximately the same area as the modern "Tibet Autonomous Region", would be administered by the Dalai Lama's government. Suzerainty is an Asian political concept indicating limited authority over a dependent state. The final 3 July 1914 accord lacked any textual boundary delimitations or descriptions. It made reference to a small scale map with very little detail, one that primarily showed lines separating China from "Inner Tibet" and "Inner Tibet" from "Outer Tibet". This map lacked any initials or signatures from the Chinese plenipotentiary Ivan Chen.

Both drafts of this small scale map extend the identical red line symbol between "Inner Tibet" and China further to the southwest, approximating the entire route of the McMahon Line, thus dead ending near Tawang at the Bhutan tripoint. However, neither draft labels "British India" or anything similar in the area that now constitutes Arunachal Pradesh.

The far more detailed McMahon Line map of 24–25 March 1914 was signed only by the Tibetan and British representatives. This map and the McMahon Line negotiations were both without Chinese participation. After Beijing repudiated Simla, the British and Tibetan delegates attached a note denying China any privileges under the agreement and signed it as a bilateral accord. British records show that the Tibetan government accepted the new border on condition that China accept the Simla Convention. As Britain did not to get an acceptance from China, Tibetans considered the McMahon line invalid.

== British ambiguity (1915–1947) ==
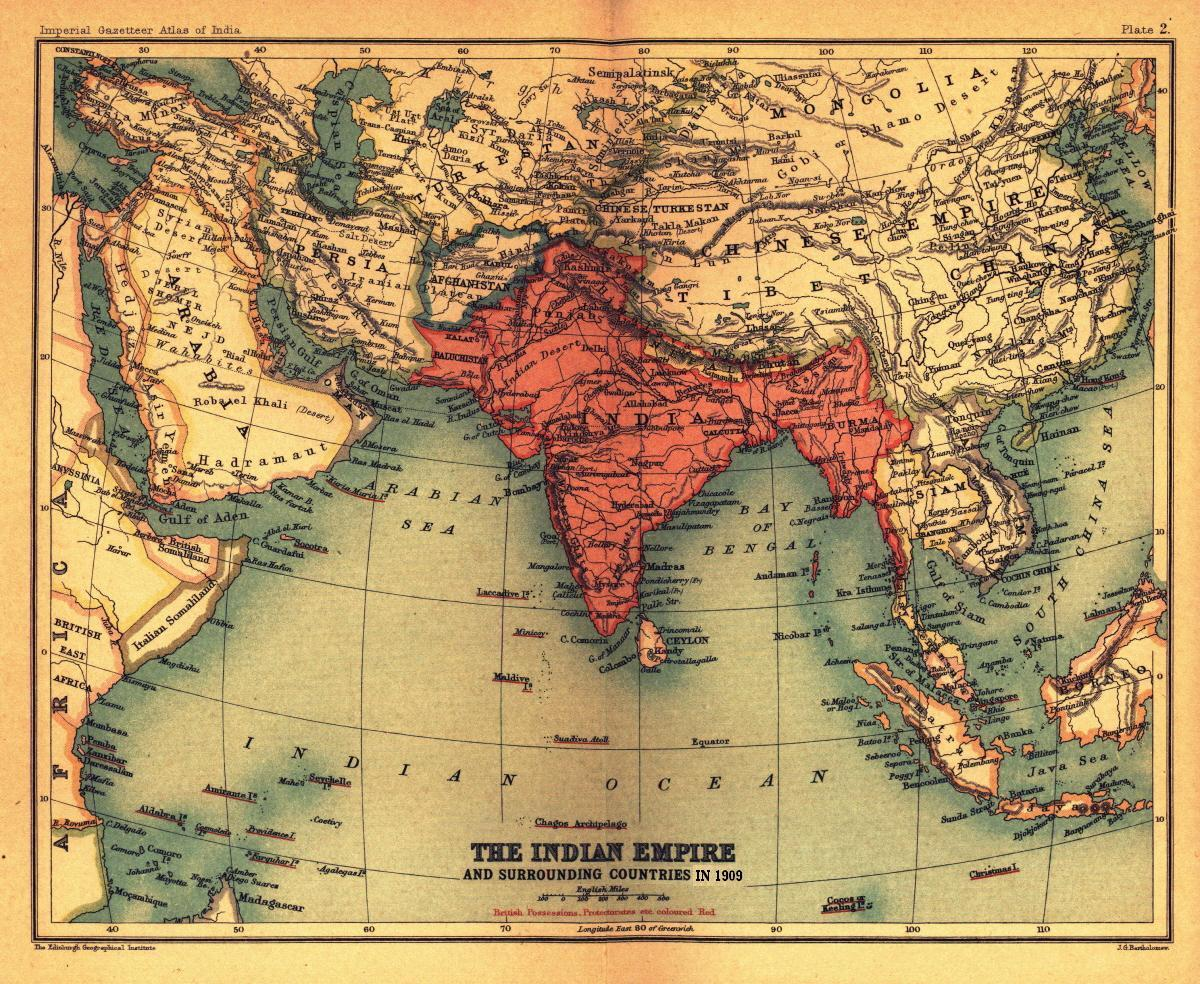
Map of "The Indian Empire and surrounding countries", from Imperial Gazetteer of India, shows the "Outer line" as the boundary between the British India and the Chinese Empire.

Simla was initially rejected by the Government of India as incompatible with the 1907 Anglo-Russian Convention. C. U. Aitchison's A Collection of Treaties, was published with a note stating that no binding agreement had been reached at Simla. The Anglo-Russian Convention was jointly renounced by Russia and Britain in 1921, but the McMahon Line was forgotten until 1935, when interest was revived by civil service officer Olaf Caroe. The Survey of India published a map showing the McMahon Line as the official boundary in 1937. In 1938, the British published the Simla Accord in Aitchison's Treaties. A volume published earlier was recalled from libraries and replaced with a volume that includes the Simla Accord together with an editor's note stating that Tibet and Britain, but not China, accepted the agreement as binding. The replacement volume has a false 1929 publication date.

In April 1938, a small British force led by Captain G. S. Lightfoot arrived in Tawang and informed the monastery that the district was now Indian territory. The Tibetan government protested and its authority was restored after Lightfoot's brief stay. The district remained in Tibetan hands until 1951. However, Lhasa raised no objection to British activity in other sectors of the McMahon Line. In 1944, the North-East Frontier Agency (NEFT) established direct administrative control for the entire area it was assigned, although Tibet soon regained authority in Tawang.

== India–China boundary dispute ==
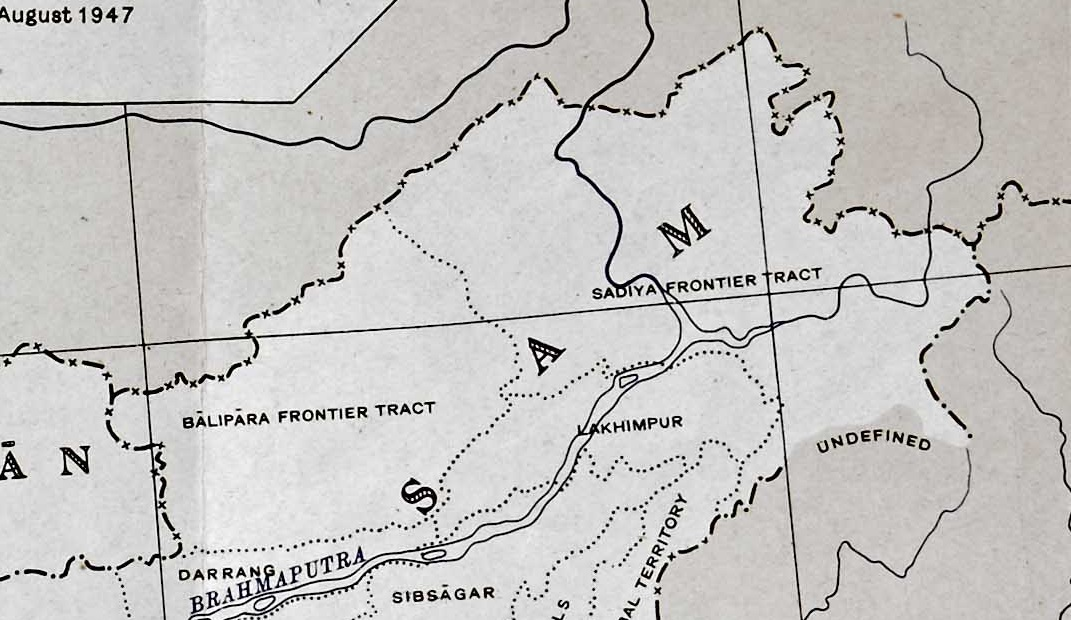
The northeast section of the 1947 political map of India, showing the McMahon Line as the boundary

When India became independent in 1947, the prevailing boundaries of British India were inherited. Maps of the period showed the McMahon Line as the boundary of India in the northeast.

In October 1947, the Tibetan government wrote a note to the Government of India asking for a "return" of the territories that the British had allegedly occupied from Tibet. Among these were listed "Sayul [Zayul] and Walong and in direction of Pemakoe, Lonag, Lopa, Mon, Bhutan, Sikkim, Darjeeling and others on this side of river Ganges". Similar claims were apparently made against China as well. The Indian government did not take the claims seriously and asked instead to be treated on par with the former British Indian government. After a few months, the Tibetans agreed to the proposal.

In Beijing, the Communist Party came to power in 1949 and declared its intention to liberate Tibet. India objected at first, but eventually acquiesced to Chinese claims over Tibet and recognised China as the suzerain power.

In the 1950s, when India-China relations were cordial and the boundary dispute quiet, the Indian government under Prime Minister Jawaharlal Nehru promoted the slogan Hindi-Chini bhai-bhai (Indians and Chinese are brothers). Nehru maintained his 1950 statement that he would not accept negotiations if China brought the boundary dispute up, hoping that "China would accept the fait accompli. In 1954, India renamed the disputed area the North East Frontier Agency (NEFA).

India acknowledged that Tibet was a part of China and gave up its extraterritorial rights in Tibet inherited from the British in a treaty concluded in April 1954. Nehru later claimed that because China did not bring up the border issue at the 1954 conference, the issue was settled. But the only border India had delineated before the conference was the McMahon Line. Several months after the conference, Nehru ordered maps of India published that showed expansive Indian territorial claims as definite boundaries, notably in Aksai Chin. In the NEFA sector, the new maps gave the hill crest as the boundary, although in some places this line is slightly north of the McMahon Line.

The failure of the 1959 Tibetan uprising and the 14th Dalai Lama's arrival in India in March led Indian parliamentarians to censure Nehru for not securing a commitment from China to respect the McMahon Line. Additionally, the Indian press started openly advocating Tibetan independence, with anti-Chinese sentiment steadily rising throughout Indian society due to rising sympathy for the Tibetans. For example, in 1959, Jayaprakash Narayan, one of India's foremost Gandhians, stated that "Tibet may be a theocratic state rather than a secular state and backward economically and socially, but no nation has the right to impose progress, whatever that may mean, upon another nation." Nehru, seeking to quickly assert sovereignty in response, established "as many military posts along the frontier as possible", unannounced and against the advice of his staff. On discovering the posts, and already suspicious from the ruminations of the Indian press, Chinese leaders began to suspect that Nehru had designs on the region. In August 1959, Chinese troops captured a new Indian military outpost at Longju on the Tsari Chu (the main tributary, from the north, of the Subansiri River in Arunachal Pradesh.) Longju was and is just north of the McMahon Line according to the inside back cover map in Maxwell and according to notable Indian mountaineer Harish Kapadia, who explored the area in 2005. His published map and text locate Longju a kilometre or two on the China side of the McMahon Line "near the Chinese garrison town of Migyitun" (which is now quite sizeable, at 28°39'40" N latitude, over four kilometres north of the line). (The rarely reliable coordinates in the Geonames database (National Geospatial-Intelligence Agency) incorrectly place "Longju" in snow and ice 10 kilometres away from the river at over 12,000 feet in elevation.) In a letter to Nehru dated 24 October 1959, Zhou Enlai proposed that India and China each withdraw their forces 20 kilometres from the line of actual control (LAC). Shortly afterwards, Zhou defined this line as "the so-called McMahon Line in the east and the line up to which each side exercises actual control in the west".

In November 1961, Nehru formally adopted the "Forward Policy" of setting up military outposts in disputed areas, including 43 outposts north of Zhou's LAC. On 8 September 1962, a Chinese unit attacked an Indian post at Dhola in the Namka Chu valley immediately south of the Thag La Ridge, seven kilometres north of the McMahon Line according to the map on page 360 of Maxwell. On 20 October China launched a major attack across the McMahon Line as well as another attack further north. The Sino-Indian War which followed was a national humiliation for India, with China quickly advancing 90 km (56 mi) from the McMahon Line to Rupa and then Chaku (65 km southeast of Tawang) in NEFA's extreme western portion, and in the NEFA's extreme eastern tip advancing 30 km (19 mi) to Walong. The Soviet Union, United States, and United Kingdom pledged military aid to India. China then withdrew to the McMahon Line and repatriated the Indian prisoners of war (1963). The legacy of the border remains significant especially in India where the government sought to explain its defeat by blaming it on being caught by surprise.

NEFA was renamed Arunachal Pradesh in 1972—Chinese maps refer to the area as South Tibet. In 1981, Chinese leader Deng Xiaoping offered India a "package settlement" of the border issue. Eight rounds of talks followed, but there was no agreement.

In 1984, India Intelligence Bureau personnel in the Tawang region set up an observation post in the Sumdorong Chu Valley just south of the highest hill crest, but three kilometres north of the McMahon Line (the straight-line portion extending east from Bhutan for 30 miles). The IB left the area before winter. In 1986, China deployed troops in the valley before an Indian team arrived. This information created a national uproar when it was revealed to the Indian public. In October 1986, Deng threatened to "teach India a lesson". The Indian Army airlifted a task force to the valley. But the Indians moved three Divisions around Wangdung to face off the Chinese troops at Sumdurung Chu, and stood their ground firmly. The confrontation was defused in May 1987 though, as clearly visible on Google Earth, though recent construction of roads and facilities are visible. The Chinese withdrew in 1995 after 8 long years of talks.

The Indian Prime Minister Rajiv Gandhi visited China in 1988 and agreed to a joint working group on boundary issues which has made little apparent positive progress. A 1993 Sino-Indian agreement set up a group to define the LAC; this group has likewise made no progress. A 1996 Sino-Indian agreement set up "confidence-building measures" to avoid border clashes. Although there have been frequent incidents where one state has charged the other with incursions, causing tense encounters along the McMahon Line following India's nuclear test in 1998 and continuing to the present, both sides generally attribute these to disagreements of less than a kilometre as to the exact location of the LAC.

== Maps ==
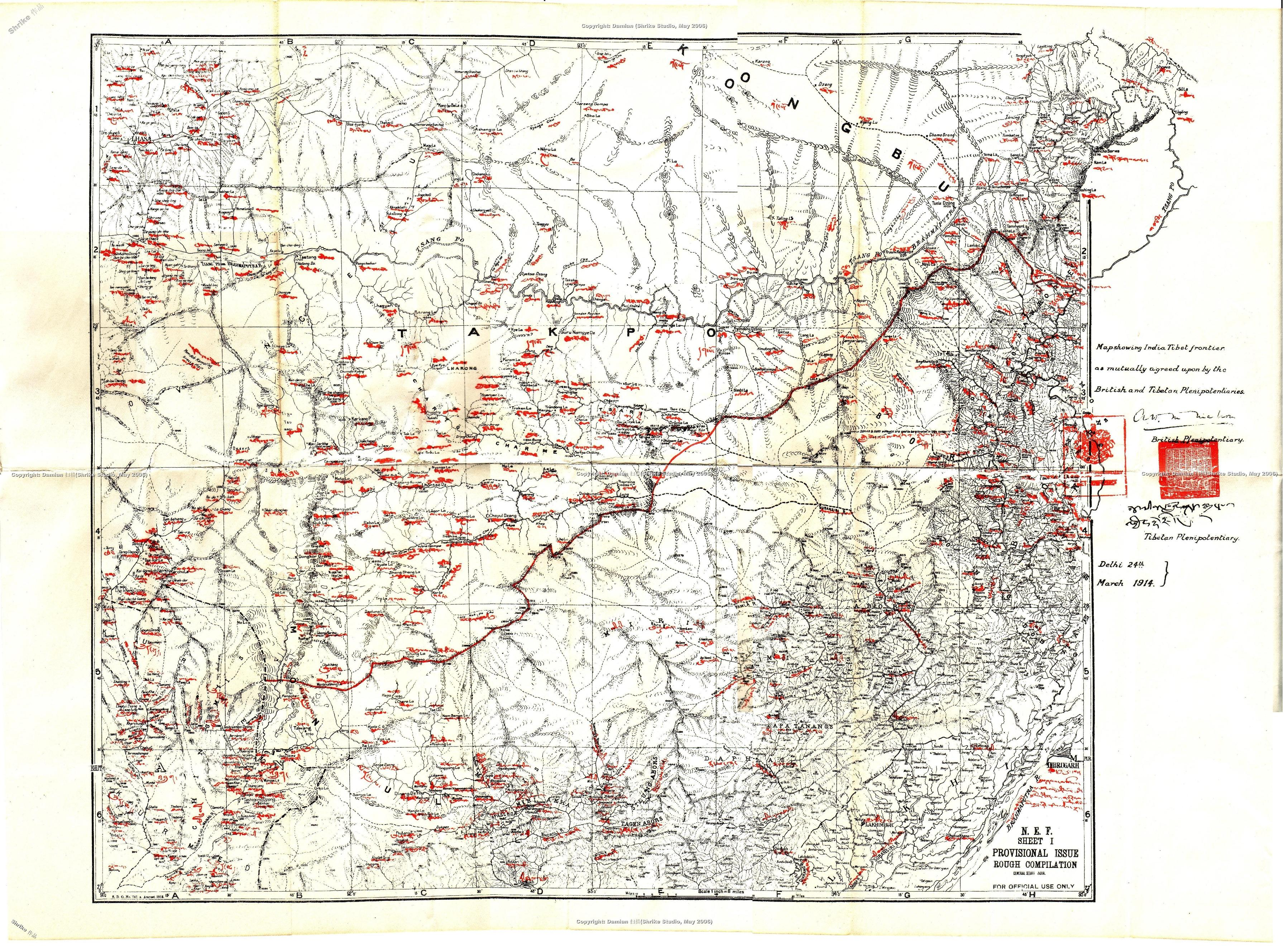
McMahon Line 1914, Map 1

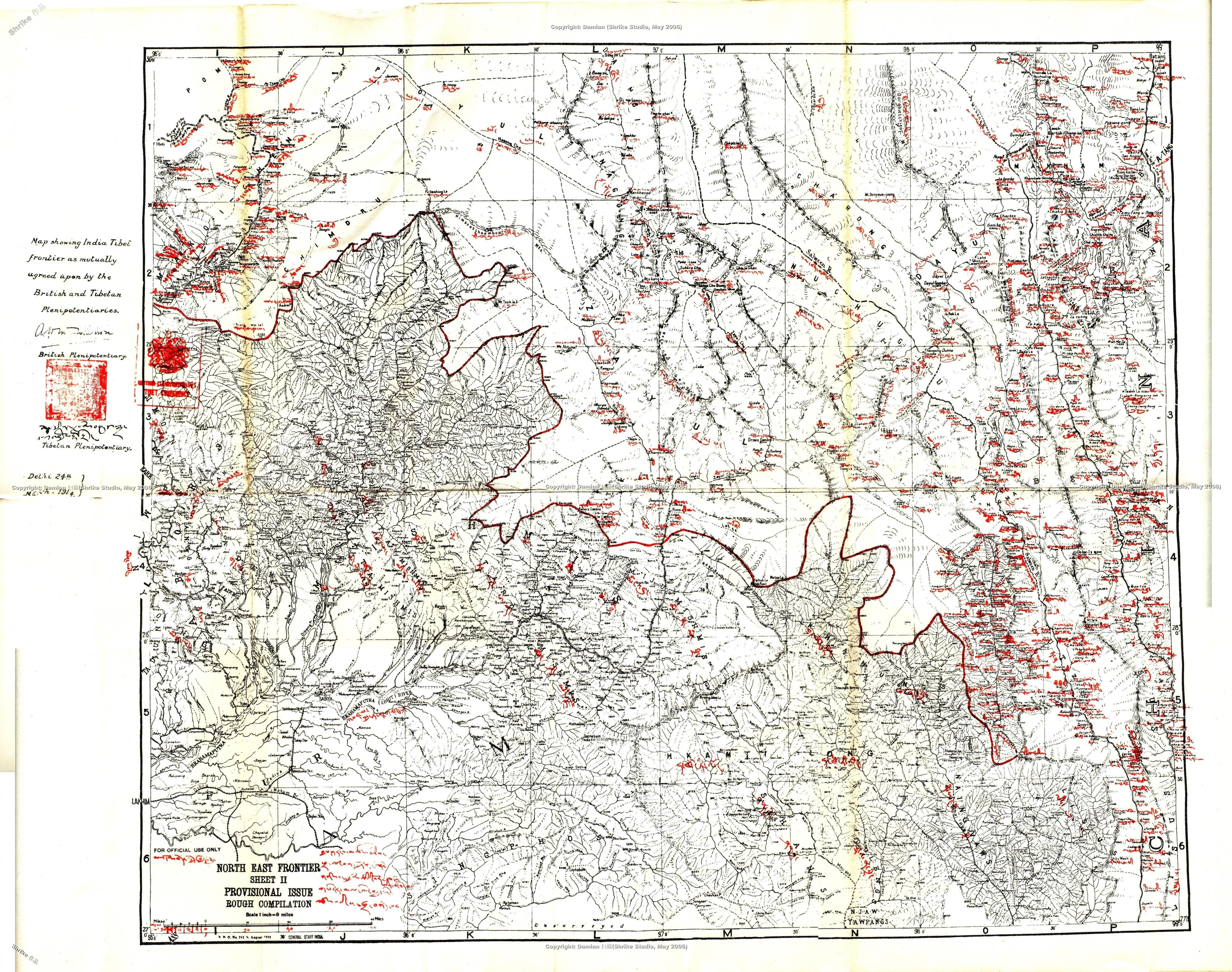
McMahon Line 1914, Map 2

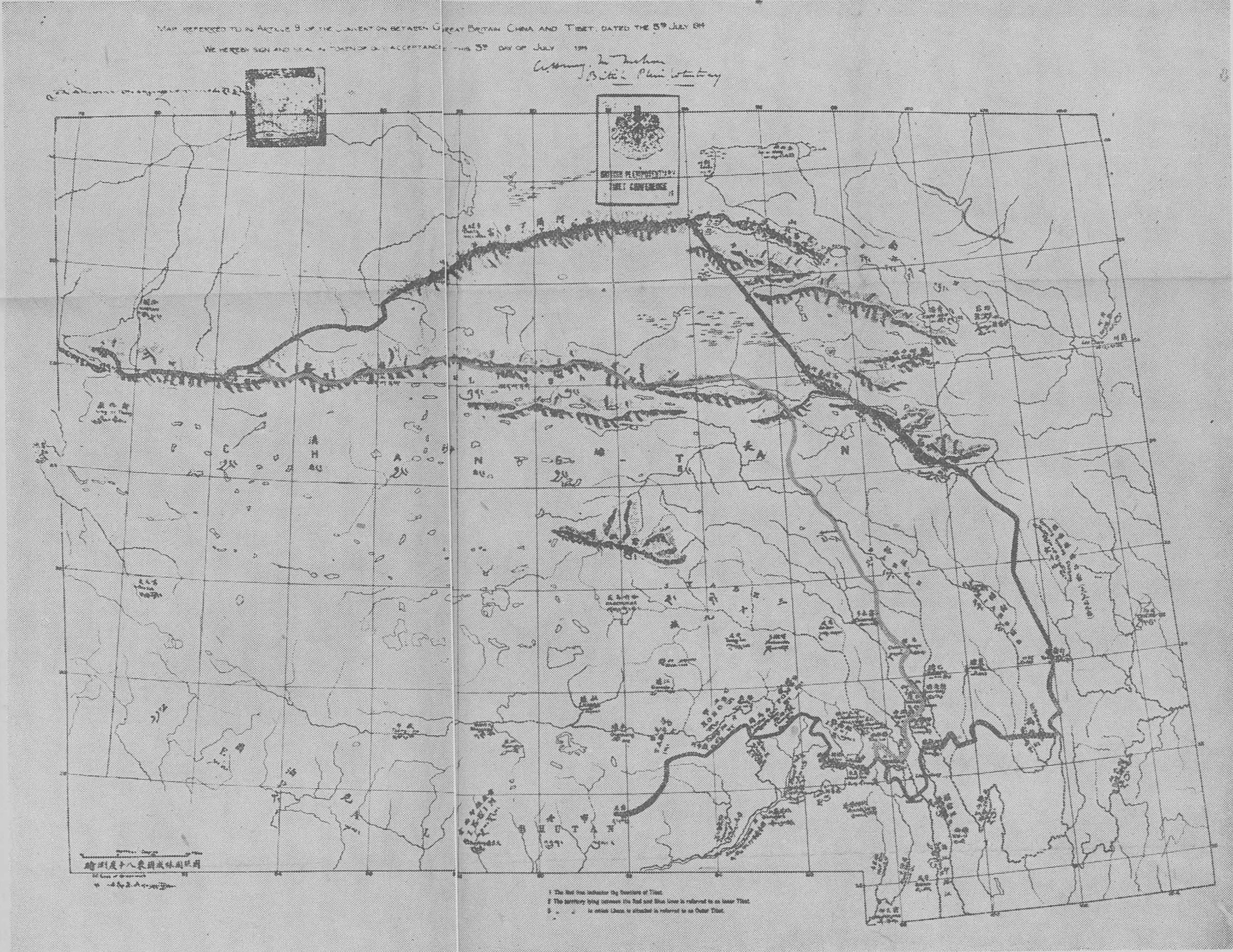
Simla Convention map signed in 1914 (facsimile)

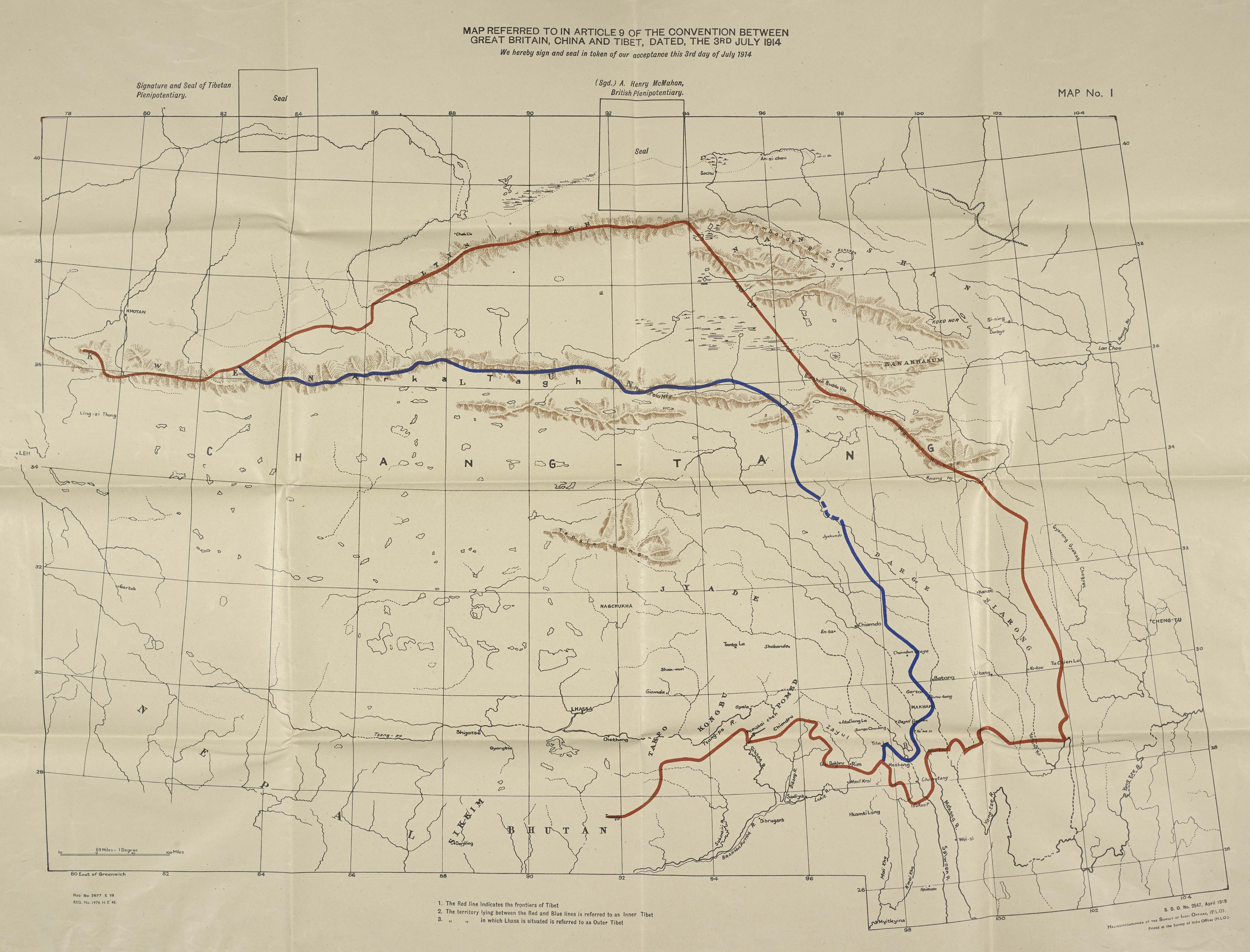
Simla Convention map reproduced by Hugh Richardson

== See also ==
- Origins of the Sino-Indian War
- Borders of India
- Durand Line
- Curzon Line
- Radcliffe Line
- Wang Xuance Line
