= Simla Convention =

Unratified treaty concerning the status of Tibet

Convention Between Great Britain, China, and Tibet
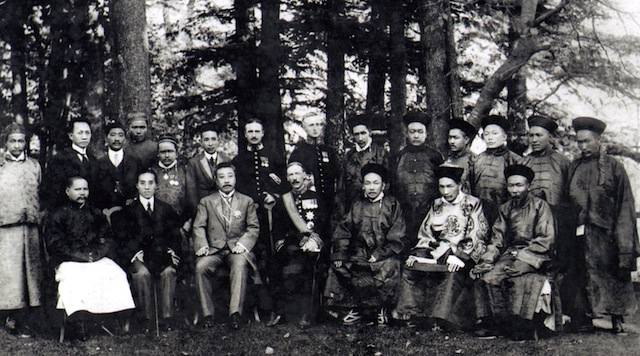
- Tibetan, British and Chinese participants and plenipotentiaries to the Simla Treaty in 1914
- Drafted: 27 April 1914
- Signed: 3 July 1914; 112 years ago
- Location: Simla, Punjab Province, British India
- Expiry: 23 May 1951; 29 October 2008 (per United Kingdom)
- Negotiators: Paljor Dorje Shatra; Henry McMahon; Ivan Chen
- Signatories: Tibet; United Kingdom
- Languages: Chinese; Tibetan; English

The Simla Convention (Traditional Chinese: 西姆拉條約; Simplified Chinese: 西姆拉条约), officially the Convention Between Great Britain, China, and Tibet, was an ambiguous treaty concerning the status of Tibet negotiated by representatives of the Republic of China, Tibet and Great Britain in Simla and Delhi during 1913–1914, with the eventual signing of the Convention taking place in Simla. The Simla Convention provided that Tibet would be divided into "Outer Tibet" and "Inner Tibet". Outer Tibet, which roughly corresponded to Ü-Tsang and western Kham, would "remain in the hands of the Tibetan Government at Lhasa under Chinese suzerainty", but China would not interfere in its administration. "Inner Tibet", roughly equivalent to Amdo and eastern Kham, would be under the jurisdiction of the Chinese government. The convention with its annexes also defined the boundary between Tibet and China proper and that between Tibet and British India (with the latter coming to be known as the McMahon Line). (Note: The map was finalised on 24/25 March 1914 by the British and Tibetan plenipotentiaries. Indian sources currently claim that, on being informed of the line, the Chinese plenipotentiary did not express any disagreement. (Sinha 1987, p. 12))

A draft convention was initialled by all three parties on 27 April 1914, but China immediately repudiated it. A slightly revised convention was signed again on 3 July 1914, but only by Britain and Tibet. The Chinese plenipotentiary, Ivan Chen, declined to sign it. The British and Tibetan plenipotentiaries then signed a bilateral declaration that stated that the convention would be binding on themselves and that China would be denied any privileges under the convention until it signed it.

Without Chinese acceptance and also for its conflict with the Anglo-Russian Convention, the Government of India regarded the signed bipartite treaty in 1915 as "for the present invalid". (Note: The Article 2 of the 1907 Anglo-Russian Convention read: "In conformity with the admitted principle of the suzerainty of China over Thibet, Great Britain and Russia engage not to enter into negotiations with Thibet except through the intermediary of the Chinese Government.") By 1921, the Anglo-Russian Convention was deemed to have lapsed, and the British felt free to deal with Tibet as an "autonomous State under the suzerainty of China", and, if necessary, "without further reference to China".

== Background ==
Tibet was a self-governing protectorate under Qing China. The later crises of the Qing Dynasty, saw reduced Chinese influence, and increased British and some Russian influence as a result of the "Great Game", and other foreign influence. Britain feared increased Russian influence in Tibet, due to contacts between the Russia-born Buryat Agvan Dorzhiev and the 13th Dalai Lama. Agvan Dorzhiev claimed that Russia was a powerful Buddhist country that would ally with Tibet against China or Britain. In response, Britain sought to increase its own influence in Tibet as a buffer for British India. British forces, led by Francis Younghusband, militarily intervened in Tibet in 1904 and made a treaty with the Tibetans, the 1904 Lhasa Convention. The British expedition showed the weakness of the Qing rule in Tibet, which caused the Qing to assert their influence once again. This and anti-foreign sentiment led to the Khampas to revolt in the Batang uprising, also called the 1905 Tibetan Rebellion. The Batang uprising was countered by Feng Quan, the assistant Qing amban in Kham, who died in the uprising. Zhao Erfeng, who replaced Feng quelled the rebellion using brutal methods.

The British government sought Chinese acceptance of suzerainty over Tibet as part of the 1906 Anglo-Chinese Convention on Tibet, but was rebuffed by the Chinese envoy Tang Shaoyi, who insisted on China's sovereignty over Tibet. As the "Great Game" was waning with the Anglo-Russian Convention of 1907, Britain and Russia who were forming an entente, acknowledged Chinese "suzerainty" over Tibet to avoid conflict over the region.

In 1910, Qing China sent a military expedition to Tibet and came close to re-conquering it before the Qing dynasty fell in the 1911 Revolution.

After the fall of the Qing dynasty in China, the Tibet government at Lhasa expelled all Chinese forces and unilaterally declared itself independent in 1913. However, this was not accepted by the newly founded Republic of China.

== Conference ==
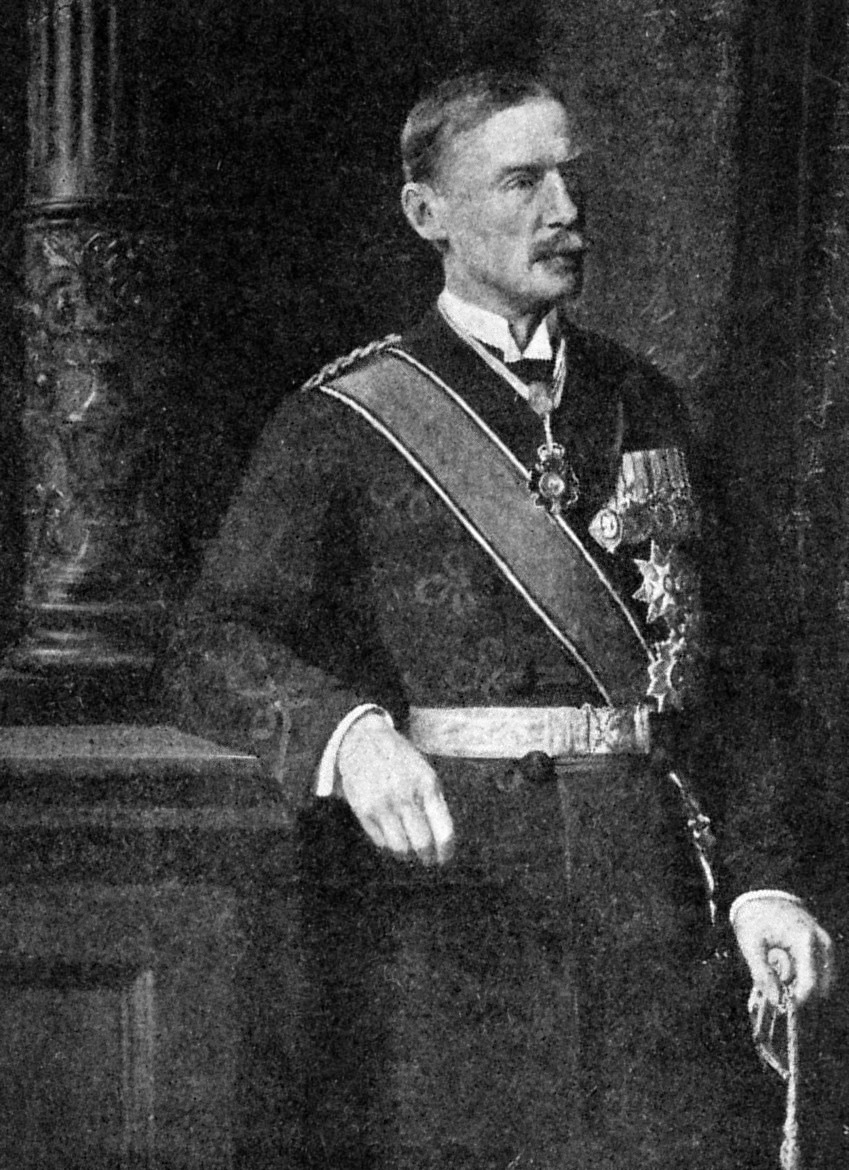
Henry McMahon, the British plenipotentiary

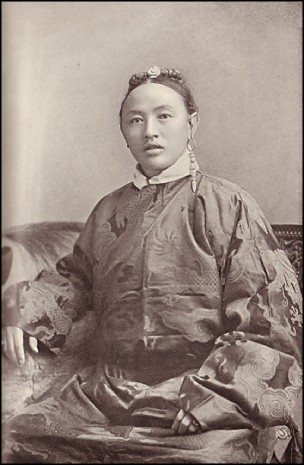
Lonchen Shatra, the Tibetan plenipotentiary

In 1913, the British convoked a conference at the Viceregal Lodge in Simla, India to discuss the issue of Tibet's status. The conference was attended by representatives of Britain, the newly founded Republic of China, and the Tibetan government at Lhasa.

Britain was represented Sir Henry McMahon, the Foreign Secretary of British India in Delhi. China was represented by Ivan Chen (I-fan Chen), who was the Commissioner for Trade and Foreign Affairs at Shanghai. He had previously been on the staff of the Chinese Mission in London, and served as the Taotai in the Burma–Yunan frontier. Tibet was represented by Paljor Dorje Shatra, commonly referred to as "Lonchen Shatra", who was a leading prime minister of Tibet. He was an observer during the talks for the 1893 trade regulations associated with the Convention of Calcutta, had accompanied the Dalai Lama during his exile in British India, and had considerable experience in dealing with British India.

The British and Chinese representatives had telegraphic communications with their Home governments, while the Tibetan representative only had land communications. McMahon was assisted by two political officers: Charles Alfred Bell, who negotiated with Shatra on the sidelines, and Archibald Rose, who did the same with Ivan Chen.

=== Overview ===
The Simla Conference, despite its name, was held in both Simla and Delhi. (Simla was a hill station, which served as the headquarters for the Indian government during the summer months. At other times, the headquarters moved back to Delhi.) The conference held eight formal sessions.

- The first two sessions on 13 October and 18 November 1913 were held in Simla.
- The next three sessions on 12 January, 17 February and 11 March 1914 were held in Delhi.
- The last three sessions on 7 April, 27 April and 3 July 1914 were held in Simla again.

In between the formal sessions, Charles Bell and Archibald Rose negotiated with the participants bilaterally. There were also a few 'informal' tripartite sessions in addition to the formal ones.

A draft Convention, along with a map showing the boundaries, was agreed and initialled by all three participants on 27 April. But the Chinese government repudiated it immediately. A slightly revised Convention, which took into account some Russian concerns, was signed on 3 July by Britain and Tibet, but not China. The conference left open the possibility of China joining the Convention in due course.

=== Initial sessions ===
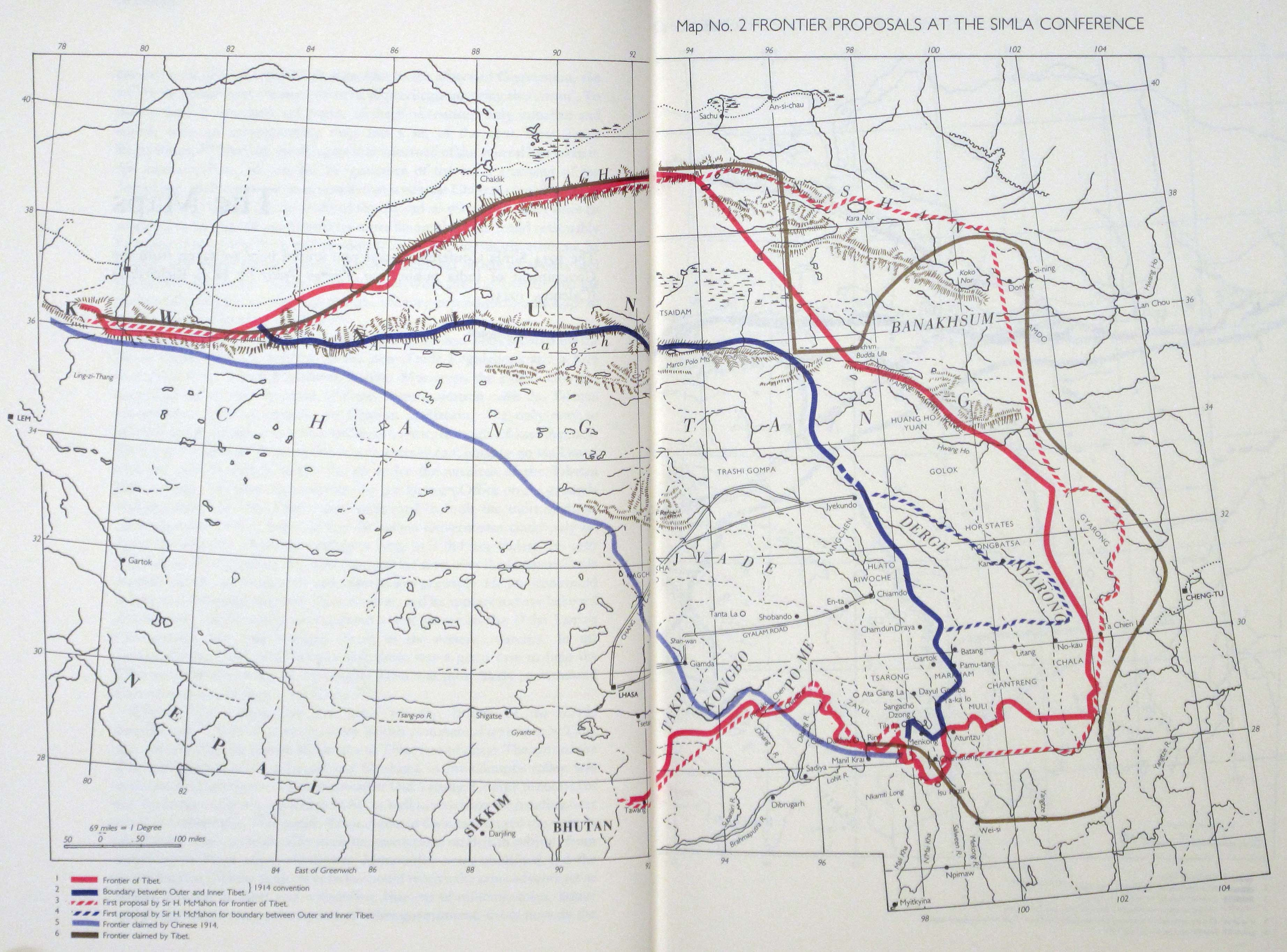
Map 1: Frontier claims: The light blue line in the west and the dark brown line in the east were the Chinese and Tibetan claims respectively. The Red Line (boundary of Tibet) and Blue Line (boundary of Outer Tibet) were initialled in the Simla Conference. The dashed lines were McMahon's initial proposals. (Hugh Richardson, 1945)

In the first session on 13 October, after the formalities of exchanging credentials, Lonchen Shatra presented an opening statement outlining the Tibetan position. The statement started by declaring, "Tibet and China have never been under each other and will never associate with each other in future. It is decided that Tibet is an independent state." (Note: This reflected the Tibetan position that the relationship that existed between Tibet and China was not any form of subordination, but rather that of priest and patron. Several scholars, including Parshotam Mehra, acknowledge this without any reservation.) Tibet repudiated all the previous conventions signed regarding itself without its own participation. It declared the boundaries of Tibet, ranging from the Kuenlun Range in the north, passing through the Altyn Tagh and Ho Shili ranges etc. and ending with the boundaries with Sichuan and Yunnan. (See the brown line in Map 1.) It enumerated all the districts contained within these boundaries, demanded that the revenue collected from them by China should be returned to the Tibetans, and also claimed damages for the forcible exactions carried out on them.

On 30 October, Ivan Chen made Chinese 'counter-proposals'. Beginning with a tendentious account of the relationship between the two countries, his statement claimed that the 'misunderstandings' that existed were solely due to the "conduct of His Holiness", who was said to be intractable and ignorant of the international situation. The statement declared that Tibet was 'an integral part' of China and that no attempt by Britain or Tibet to interrupt this 'territorial integrity' would be tolerated. China vowed not to convert Tibet into a Chinese province and Britain should likewise undertake not to annex any part of it. A Chinese Resident was to be stationed in Lhasa, and Tibet should be guided by China in its foreign and military affairs. Tibet should grant amnesty to all the officials and non-officials who had been previously punished. Chen also presented a map marking the boundary between China and Tibet which conformed to the then prevalent Chinese notions. (See the light blue line in Map 1.)

At the second meeting, McMahon laid down that the first and most important question was the 'definition of the limits' of Tibet. Then there would be other minor issues such as the Tibetan claims of compensation for losses and the Chinese demands for amnesty. While Lonchen Shatra agreed to the procedure, Ivan Chen countered that deciding the political status of Tibet should be the first order of business. Chen also revealed that he had 'definite orders' from his government to give priority to the political questions. In response, McMahon ruled that he would discuss the frontier issue with Lonchen Shatra alone until Chen obtained authorisation from his government to join it. After five days, the Chinese government authorised Chen to join the discussion.

=== Frontier discussions ===
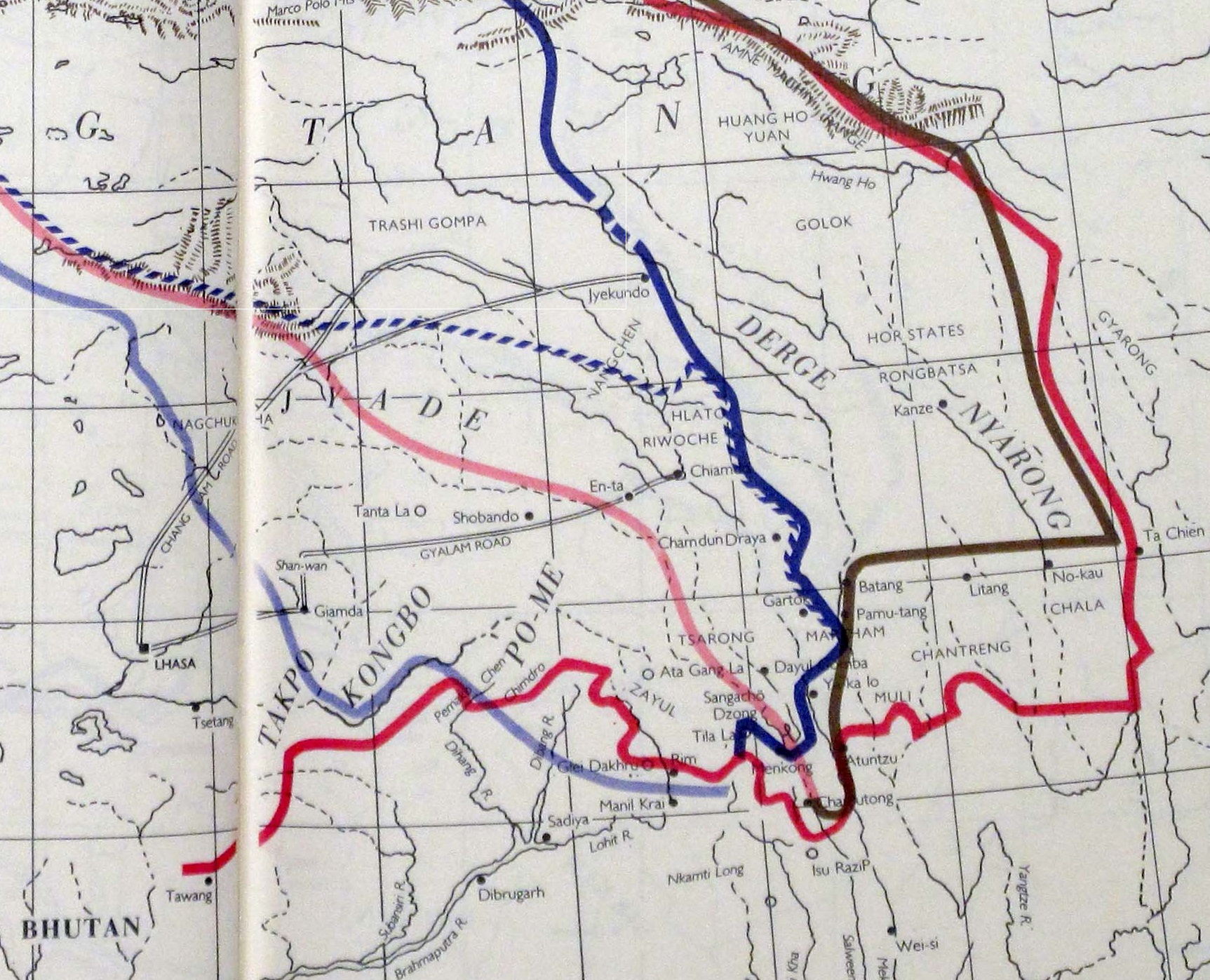
Map 2: Frontier proposals in Kham: Dark blue line – the boundary of 'Outer Tibet' proposed in the conference; Light blue line – the boundary proposed by China; Pink line (1915) and Dashed blue line (1919) were later Chinese proposals. (Hugh Richardson, 1945)

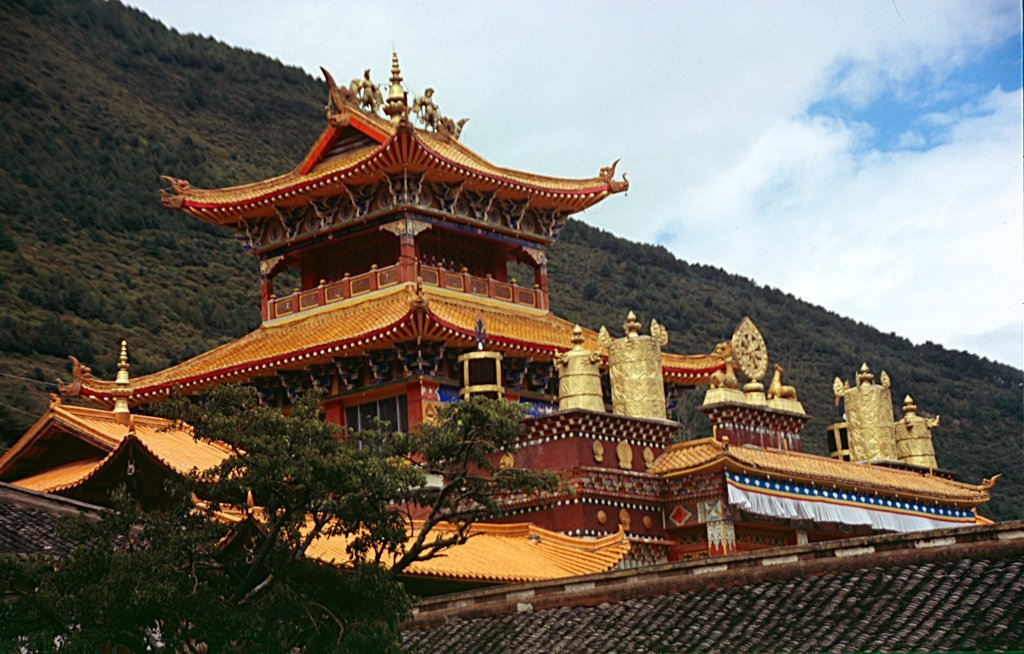
Nanwu Si monastery in Tachienlu

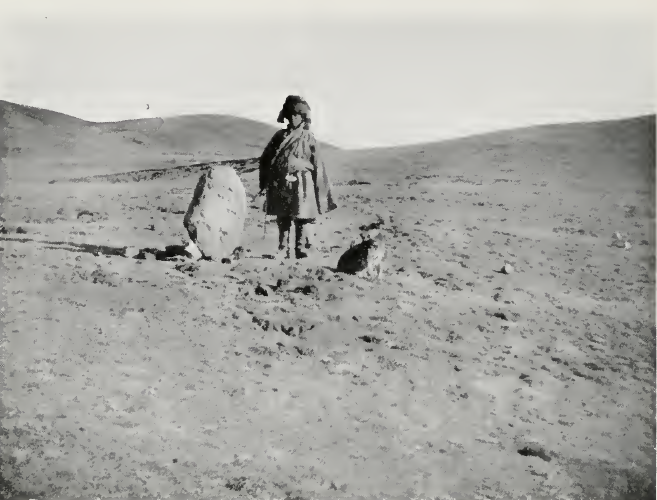
The boundary pillar near Batang, photographed by Eric Teichman in 1922

Informal discussions took place throughout December 1913, assisted by Charles Bell and Archibald Rose. Chen admitted to Rose that the frontier question was 'exploded' upon him rather unexpectedly. But Rose replied that Chen had himself pushed it to the forefront.

In the second informal meeting, Chen read out a statement, which started by arguing the Chinese position on the political status of Tibet. He maintained that China had been in effective occupation as far west as Giamda. The claim included the districts of Pomed, Zayul, Markham, Derge, Draya and Gyade, in addition to the 'generally' recognised claims to Kokonor, Batang and Litang. (Note: All the locations mentioned with the exception of Kokonor were in Kham. "Kokonor" appears to stand for some undefined part of Amdo, perhaps even the whole of it.)

The Lonchen replied that Tibet had always been 'an independent country'. At one stage a Chinese princess had been given in marriage to a Tibetan ruler and that, at another, a boundary pillar had been erected at Marugong (Kokonor–Kansu border). Even though China had given some titles to the officials in the eastern regions, the taxation and administration of the region had always been in Tibetan hands.

Chen claimed that there was a boundary pillar erected 300 li west of Batang in 1727, marking Chinese occupation. Lonchen demanded documentary proof that such a pillar had been erected. Chen was unable to produce any documentary proof other than second-hand reports.

When his turn came, the Lonchen mentioned that three identical monoliths were erected a thousand years earlier in Lhasa, the Chinese capital and the frontier, recording a Chinese–Tibetan treaty. He produced copies of the inscription on the pillars and references to it in the 'History of Tibet' compiled by the 5th Dalai Lama. The Lonchen had a mountain of evidence containing taxation and administration records for all the regions up to Tachienlu (Kangding). The Chinese had nothing comparable to offer.

In the face of the conflicting claims, both the sides agreed to prepare written statements embodying the complete evidence available on the frontier. These were presented on 12 January 1914, during the third session of the conference after it had moved to Delhi. China's extended claims were based on Zhao Erfeng's advances, which were quite recent (1906–1911). Chen justified them as 'effective occupation' recognised in international law. Lonchen ridiculed the claim, by listing the atrocities committed by Zhao and querying how the raids of such a person could be deemed lawful.

In the course of these discussions, McMahon formed the idea of distinguishing between so-called 'Inner Tibet' and 'Outer Tibet'. The main motivation, according to scholar Parshotam Mehra, was the recognition that, while the Chinese had far-flung garrisons in the frontier territories, they had been unable to affect any material change in the Tibetan administration of the tribal states within them. So, some kind of shared presence in these territories would be necessary. These were to form the 'Inner Tibet'. The 'Outer Tibet' was to be Lhasa's dominion, with only Chinese suzerainty over it.

=== McMahon's proposals ===
On 17 February 1914, in the fourth session of the conference, McMahon laid on the table his proposal for the identification of 'Inner Tibet' and 'Outer Tibet' regions, along with a map showing the boundaries of these regions. (See the dashed red line and dashed blue line in Map 1.) He explained that the authentic records of both China and Tibet dating back to 822 CE had established Tibet's historical frontiers (the "red line" on the map). In the 18th century, under the Kangxi and Qianlong emperors, Chinese control was established on parts of Tibet, and a boundary pillar was erected near Batang. These developments developed a "well-defined line" (the "blue line") between the sphere of "periodic Chinese intervention" and the autonomous region of Tibet where Chinese dictation was "purely nominal". These two lines now defined two zones in Tibet, for which he used the terms 'Inner Tibet' and 'Outer Tibet'.

The enunciation of the two zones marked on a map generated a strong reaction from both the Tibetan and Chinese plenipotentiaries. Lonchen argued strongly that Batang and Litang should be included in 'Outer Tibet' and adduced considerable official evidence. Ivan Chen claimed that China, under the Guangxu and Xuantong emperors, took the 'Inner Tibet' areas "back" and restored them to the Sichuan province. In the remaining areas of Tibet, he claimed that the Lhasa Amban had conducted direct administration. He claimed that his government could not recede from the claims he had made on 12 January. Frantic negotiations followed in Delhi and Beijing, and even in London. McMahon had a 'verbal statement' delivered to Chen via Archibald Rose, pointing out that, in 1904 China had no administration in either zone of Tibet, and citing Fu Sung-mu's authority as evidence. He also warned the Chinese plenipotentiary that China's "uncompromising position" and renewed fighting along the China–Tibet frontier was fast eroding his own ability to persuade the Tibetans to make any concessions at all.

At the fifth session on 11 March, McMahon tabled a draft of the convention, and introduced it with a variation of his "verbal statement". He appealed to both the Tibetan and Chinese representatives for "a broad and statesmanlike spirit of compromise" so that their labours could be brought to a speedy conclusion. China was not receptive. Chen maintained that it was premature to discuss a draft since the general principles (of 'Inner' and 'Outer' Tibet) had not been accepted by his government. Meanwhile, China's amban-designate for Lhasa, sitting in Calcutta, (Note: China had no presence in Tibet at the time of the conference, with Tibet having driven out all Chinese officials in 1911. The Chinese government nevertheless appointed an Amban (Imperial resident), who stationed himself in Calcutta, waiting for Tibetan acquiescence.) was advising the Chinese government to keep up the military pressure on the frontier and that the British were in no position to intervene militarily.

The sixth session on 7 April went by with no apparent progress. On 27 March, Chen had been warned that, if he was unable to work towards a settlement based on the map, then McMahon would have to withdraw the map and make alternative proposals. (Note: These alternatives could perhaps lean towards the Tibetan position, viz., that Tibet should be recognised as an independent country.) At 7 April meeting, Chen proposed a certain 'five-point proposal' communicated by Beijing, which made promises about how China would administer the territory it claimed, but without any change to the claim itself. The proposal found no favour with the other participants. At the end of the meeting, McMahon told Chen that he intended to call the next session on 14 April in order to withdraw the current draft. Chen begged for more time.

Eventually the seventh session was called on 22 April. In the interim, Chen had won some concessions. The border zone including the towns of Atuntse and Tachienlu had been conceded to China as was the lake of Kokonor. (See Map 1.) Nevertheless, on 22 April, Chen had again presented five new 'demands', which found no favour with the other participants. Lonchen also withheld consent as Derge and Nyarong were placed in Inner Tibet. At this point, McMahon made a show of withdrawing the entire draft convention, which made the other participants rethink their position. Chen begged for time to consult his governrment.

After an adjournment of five days, the conference reconvened on 27 April 1914 when the draft convention, along with the map, was initialled by all three participants. It was not a straightforward affair. The Chinese government's message to Chen said that the draft convention was acceptable except for the Article IX, which dealt with the boundary between 'Inner Tibet' and 'Outer Tibet'. So he was not authorised to sign the convention and he left the meeting chamber. In his absence, McMahon and Lonchen Shatra appended their initials to the draft convention. After he learnt what transpired in the meeting, Chen agreed to initial the draft convention reluctantly, having received assurance that initialling it did not amount to final acceptance. (Note: We might surmise that initialling the draft convention amounted to recognising it as a valid record of the conference, while a full signature was needed for the final acceptance. As the Tibetan language did not have a system of initials, Lonchen Shatra put down his full signature in lieu of initials.)

=== April–June 1914 ===
During the period of April–June, prior to the final meeting, Britain held discussions with Russia on the draft convention. It was obliged to do so by the Anglo-Russian Convention of 1907, as the two Great Powers had agreed to leave Tibet as a neutral zone, free of their interference. (Note: Evidently the Anglo-Russian Convention was signed in a context where China had suzerainty over Tibet. With Tibet's declaration of independence in 1912, the situation had altered, and it was in the interest of both the powers to return the situation to status quo ante.)

China repudiated its plenipotentiary's act of initialling the draft convention calling it unauthorised. It also implied that Chen had been coerced to initial the convention, a charge rejected by Britain. (Note: The records of the meeting do not indicate any coercion, but Chen might have been led to believe that if he did not initial the convention, Britain and Tibet would sign it among themselves.) China also charged that Henry McMahon, the British plenipotentiary, was 'unfriendly' to China and had an 'uncompromising attitude'. It requested that negotiations be continued, with the venue shifted to London or Beijing. London backed its plenipotentiary, declaring that "every point" in China's favour had been conceded by him as long as it caused no injustice to Tibet. For the remainder of the period, China continued to lobby for further adjustments in the boundary through the British envoy in Beijing as well as the Chinese envoy in London. The demands were turned down by Britain.

In India, McMahon and Viceroy Hardinge believed that China was bluffing and the best way to call it would be to sign the convention with Tibet alone. On 25 June, Britain sent a memorandum to China explaining all the concessions that were made to China during the negotiations and adding a new concession by restricting Tibet's northern boundary to the Kunlun Mountains instead of Altyn Tagh. It also indicated that the "patience of HMG [His Majesty's Government]" was exhausted, and, if China cannot agree to sign the convention by the end of the month, Britain was prepared to sign it separately with Tibet. China's response delivered on 30 June said that no agreement was achieved on the territorial issue and that China would not recognise any convention signed by Britain and Tibet alone.

=== Final meeting ===
On 2 July, McMahon was authorised by the British government to call a final meeting to sign the convention, which was now slightly altered from the April version on procedural matters. McMahon mapped out his strategy. In the event of China not agreeing to sign, Britain and Tibet would sign the Convention along with the Trade Regulations and a bilateral declaration to the effect that the convention would be binding on the two parties. China could participate in the convention as soon as it consented to sign. The procedure was not explicitly authorised by London. In fact, the Foreign Office initiated an instruction to the effect a separate signature with Tibet could not be authorised by the British government, but it was received in Simla too late to affect the proceedings.

On 3 July, the conference was convened at 11:15 pm. The late hour was to allow time for Ivan Chen to receive his final instructions from Beijing. They were still not received. So, Chen stood by his earlier instructions and declined to sign. Lonchen Shatra was ready to sign and so McMahon's procedure was adopted after Chen left the meeting chamber. In the event, the convention was initialled rather than signed. The bilateral declaration was signed as were the maps. After Chen returned to the meeting chamber, McMahon informed him that he could still convene another meeting until 6 July if Chen were to be ready to sign.

Evidence indicates that Ivan Chen viewed the Convention in favourable terms, thought it best obtainable under the circumstances, and believed that his government would accept it in due course. It is also known that he made a brave effort to convince President Yuan Shikai to accept it after his return to China.

== Convention ==
The boundary between Tibet and British India, later called the McMahon Line, was also included in the map referred to in the treaty. This boundary was negotiated between the British and Tibetan representatives separately, in the absence of the Chinese representative.

The border decided by them was incorporated in the Simla conference map, which showed the boundary of Tibet as a "red line" and the border between Outer and Inner Tibet as a "blue line". This map was provided as an annexe to the proposed agreement and was initialled by all three representatives on 27 April 1914. (Note: Sinha (1966), p. 37: "The two maps (27 April 1914 and 3 July 1914) illustrating the boundaries bear the full signature of the Tibetan Plenipotentiary; the first bears the full signature of the Chinese Plenipotentiary also; the second bears the full signatures along with seals of both Tibetan and British Plenipotentiaries. (V. Photographic reproductions of the two maps in Atlas of the North Frontier of India, New Delhi: Ministry of External Affairs 1960)"; Goldstein (1991), p. 80 quotes the India Office records IOR/L/PS/10/344.; Gupta (1971): "The Indian Government opened bilateral negotiations with the Tibetans in Deli in February–March 1914 (the conferees having retreated from the Simla winter) with the object of securing Tibetan agreement to the proposed alignment.")

The Schedule appended to the Convention contained further notes. For example, it was to be understood that "Tibet forms part of Chinese territory" and after the Tibetans selected a Dalai Lama, the Chinese government was to be notified and the Chinese commissioner in Lhasa would "formally communicate to His Holiness the titles consistent with his dignity, which have been conferred by the Chinese Government"; that the Tibetan government appointed all officers for "Outer Tibet", and that "Outer Tibet" was not to be represented in the Chinese Parliament or any such assembly.

On 3 July 1914, the British and Tibetan plenipotentiaries signed the Convention without a Chinese signature. They also signed an additional bilateral declaration with the claim that the convention would be binding on them and that China would be denied any privileges under the agreement until it signed it. (Note: This effectively meant that Tibet's de facto independence would continue until China signed the Convention. Lhasa would also be within its rights to contest the Chinese control of the "Inner Tibet" regions.) Ivan Chen left the room briefly while the British and Tibetan representatives signed the documents, and he did not have knowledge of the proceedings. He believed that the Convention itself was signed (whereas it was only initialled) and McMahon left him to retain that impression. The British and Lonchen Shatra also signed a fresh set of trade Regulations to replace those of 1908.

== Aftermath ==
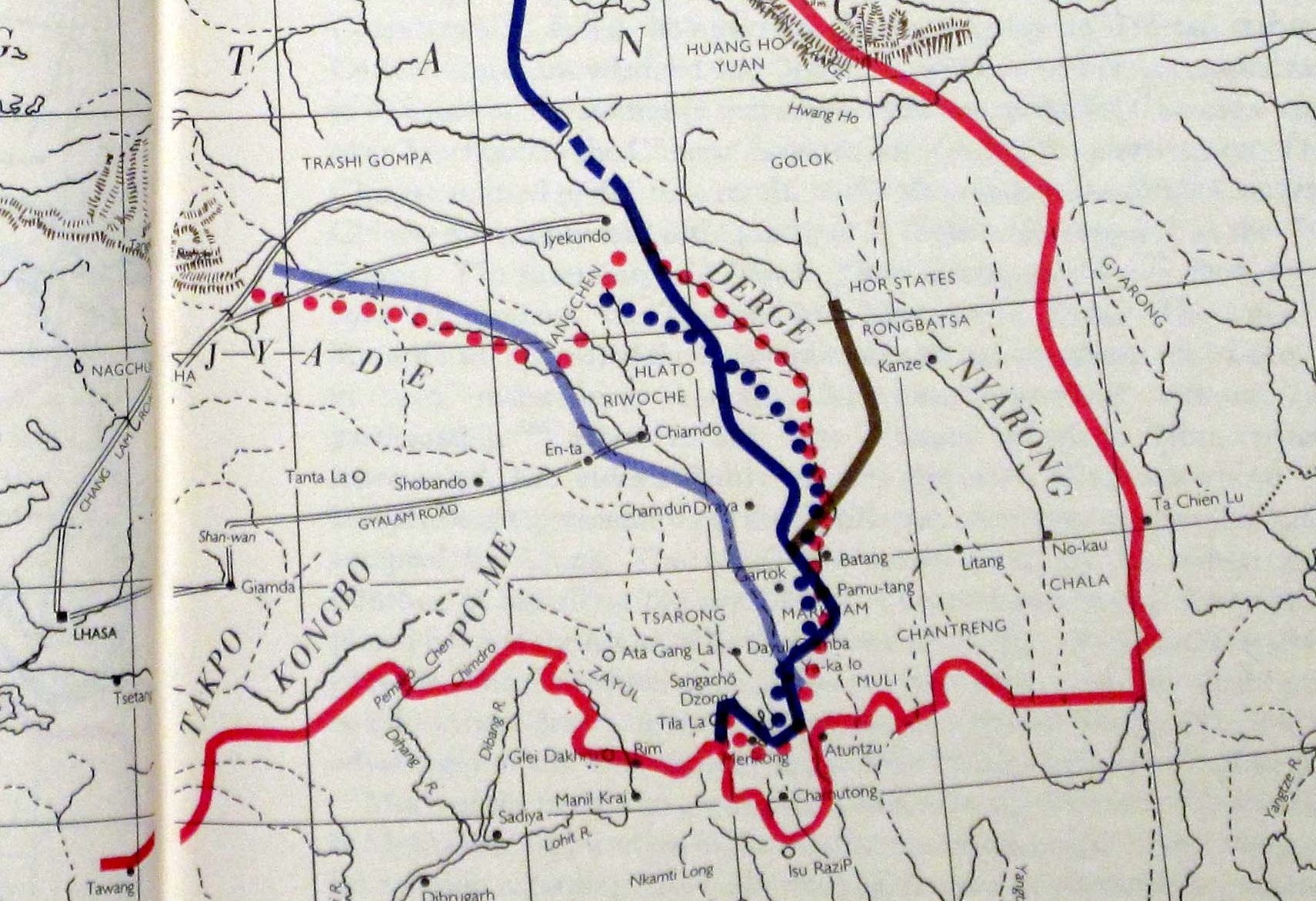
China's control in Kham: The light blue line on the west represents the boundary in 1912–1917; China was pushed back to the brown line during 1918–1932. By 1945, it arrived at the dotted red line. The dark blue line is the Simla Convention boundary that China turned down.

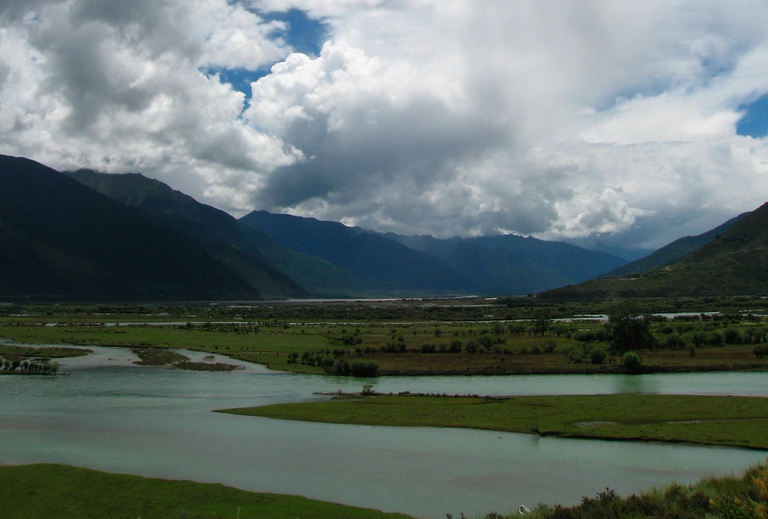
Landscape near Chamdo

The Simla Conference having ended with a bipartite treaty rather than a tripartite one, the door was left open for China to join the Convention whenever it deemed fit. The signed bipartite treaty continued to govern the relations between Tibet and the British Empire until the latter's departure from India in 1947.

World War I began soon after the Simla Conference ended, and the British government became preoccupied with the war arrangements. McMahon was posted as the British High Commissioner to Egypt and he soon departed India. In Tibet, the feeling was strong that the conference was a failure despite Tibet having had to give up territory, in particular in the 'Inner Tibet'. There were also demands for direct negotiations between Tibet and China. Citing these concerns, Tibet requested arms for fighting the Chinese who were still in possession of the border regions of 'Outer Tibet'. The British sold the Tibetans 5,000 guns and half a million rounds of ammunition. The viceroy also told them that the reason for the failure of the conference was that Britain had tried to achieve for Tibet greater advantages than the Chinese were prepared to concede. Further demands for arms and tax concessions were politely denied.

In 1917, conflict broke out between the Tibetans and Chinese in Kham near the area of Riwoche. The Tibetans made use of their new arms to strike back and, within a year, recaptured Chamdo and the areas east of Upper Yangtse River (Dri Chu), all of which China had refused to yield at the Simla Conference. The British intervened diplomatically and arranged a truce, setting the border along the Upper Yangtse River, along with the region of Derge going to Tibet.

After the conflict, renewed efforts were made to bring China into the Simla Convention. In May 1919, the Chinese made a four-point proposal via the British envoy Jordan, suggesting changes in some of the articles of the convention, and adjusting the boundary to reflect the ground situation. The British considered the Chinese proposals favourably and were ready to make counter-proposals. But a scheduled meeting of Jordan with the Chinese minister in August 1919 was abruptly cancelled saying that, due to a change in public opinion, the Chinese Cabinet had decided to postpone the negotiations. There had been rumours in China about a "sell-away" on Tibet, and the British envoy was led to believe that fresh intrigues by the Japanese caused apprehensions of public agitations.

In 1917, the Bolsheviks came to power in Russia and repudiated all the treaties of the Tsarist regime, including the Anglo-Russian Convention, which would have precluded a bipartite Simla Convention between Britain and Tibet coming into force. By 1921, the British Foreign Office ruled that the Anglo-Russian Convention was no longer valid and therefore all its restrictions were removed from practice. Foreign Secretary Lord Curzon gave a memorandum to the Chinese envoy in August 1921 stating the British intention to recognise the status of Tibet as an "autonomous State under the suzerainty of China" and deal with it on that basis "without further reference to China".

In 1943, the British contemplated discarding the fiction of Chinese suzerainty and supporting Tibet's claim to independence, but decided against it, under the belief that it might precipitate a Chinese attack on Tibet. The British position of Chinese suzerainty over Tibet was reiterated.

=== Publication issues ===
The official treaty record, C.U. Aitchison's A Collection of Treaties, was published with a note stating that no binding agreement had been reached at Simla. Legal scholar M. C. van Praag states that the only mechanism for a 1914 treaty to become invalid is one of the parties repudiated it, and neither Tibet nor Britain did so.

== Commentaries ==
Melvyn Goldstein, an American Tibetologist from Case Western Reserve University, assessed that Simla did nothing to resolve the Tibet Question. He indicated that since the Republic of China did not agree to the Simla Convention, Tibet still had no legal status accepted by the Chinese government.

== 2008 British policy change ==
Until 2008, the British Government's position remained the same that China held suzerainty over Tibet but not full sovereignty. It was the only state still to hold this view. David Miliband, the British Foreign Secretary, described the old position as an anachronism originating in the geopolitics of the early 20th century. Britain revised this view on 29 October 2008, when it recognised Chinese sovereignty over Tibet by issuing a statement on its website. (Note: Miliband, David, "Written Ministerial Statement on Tibet (29/10/2008)", British Foreign Office website, archived from the original on 2 December 2008: "Our ability to get our points across has sometimes been clouded by the position the UK took at the start of the 20th century on the status of Tibet, a position based on the geo-politics of the time. Our recognition of China's "special position" in Tibet developed from the outdated concept of suzerainty. Some have used this to cast doubt on the aims we are pursuing and to claim that we are denying Chinese sovereignty over a large part of its own territory. We have made clear to the Chinese Government, and publicly, that we do not support Tibetan independence. Like every other EU member state, and the United States, we regard Tibet as part of the People's Republic of China. Our interest is in long term stability, which can only be achieved through respect for human rights and greater autonomy for the Tibetans.") The Economist stated that although the British Foreign Office's website does not use the word sovereignty, officials at the Foreign Office said "it means that, as far as Britain is concerned, 'Tibet is part of China. Full stop.'"

The British Government sees their new stances as an updating of their position, while some others have viewed it as a major shift in the British position. (Note: Lunn (2009), p. 7: "However, in October 2008 there was what some have viewed as a major shift in the British position, although the Government sees it more as an updating of it. This involved abandoning the concept of 'Chinese suzerainty' on the grounds that it was unclear and out-dated.") Tibetologist Robert Barnett thinks that the decision has wider implications. India's claim to a part of its north-east territories, for example, is largely based on the same agreements – notes exchanged during the Simla convention of 1914, which set the boundary between India and Tibet – that the British appear to have simply discarded. It has been speculated that Britain's shift was made in exchange for China making greater contributions to the International Monetary Fund.

== Maps ==
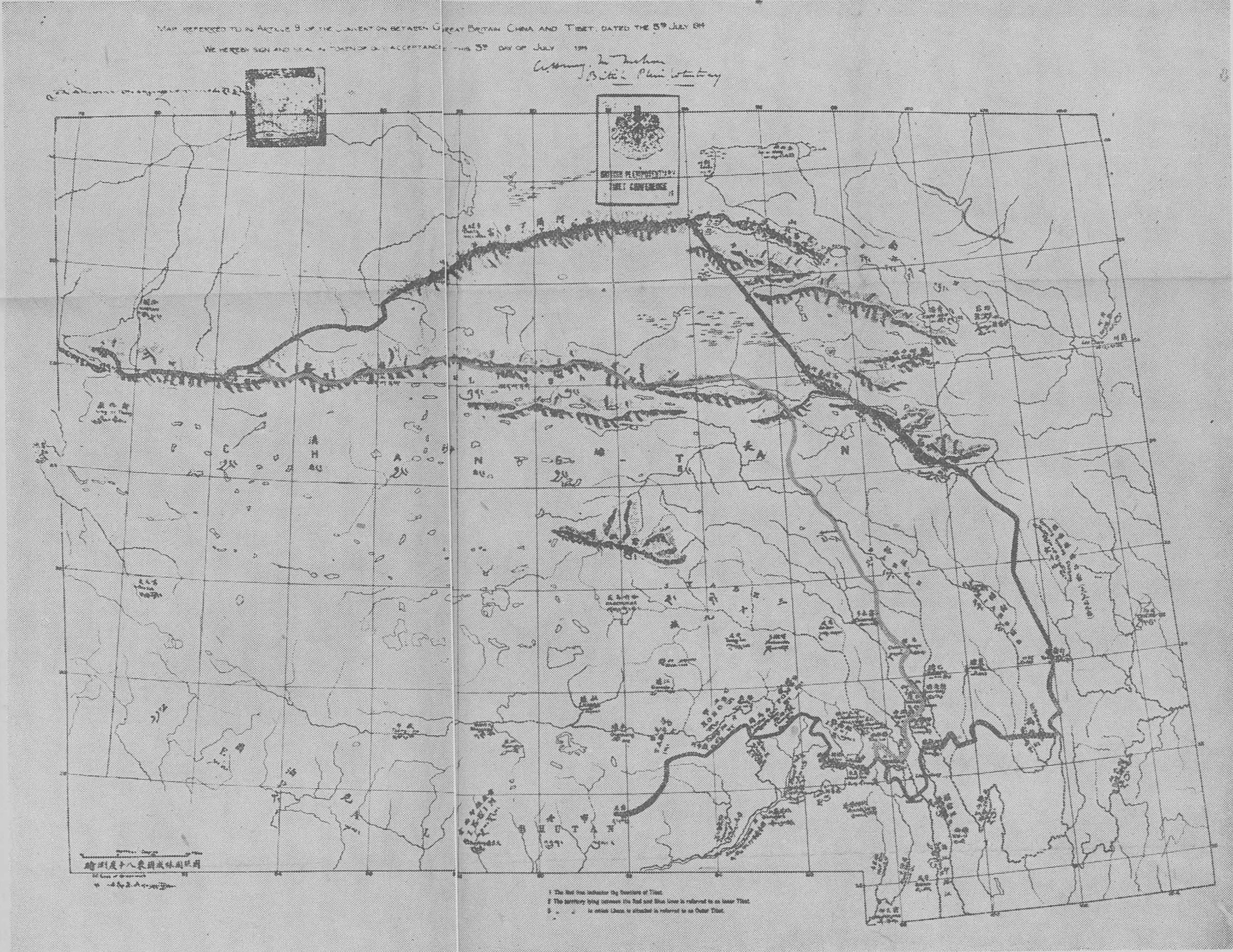
Simla Accord treaty map, signed in 1914 (showing the boundary of Tibet and the boundary of Outer Tibet)

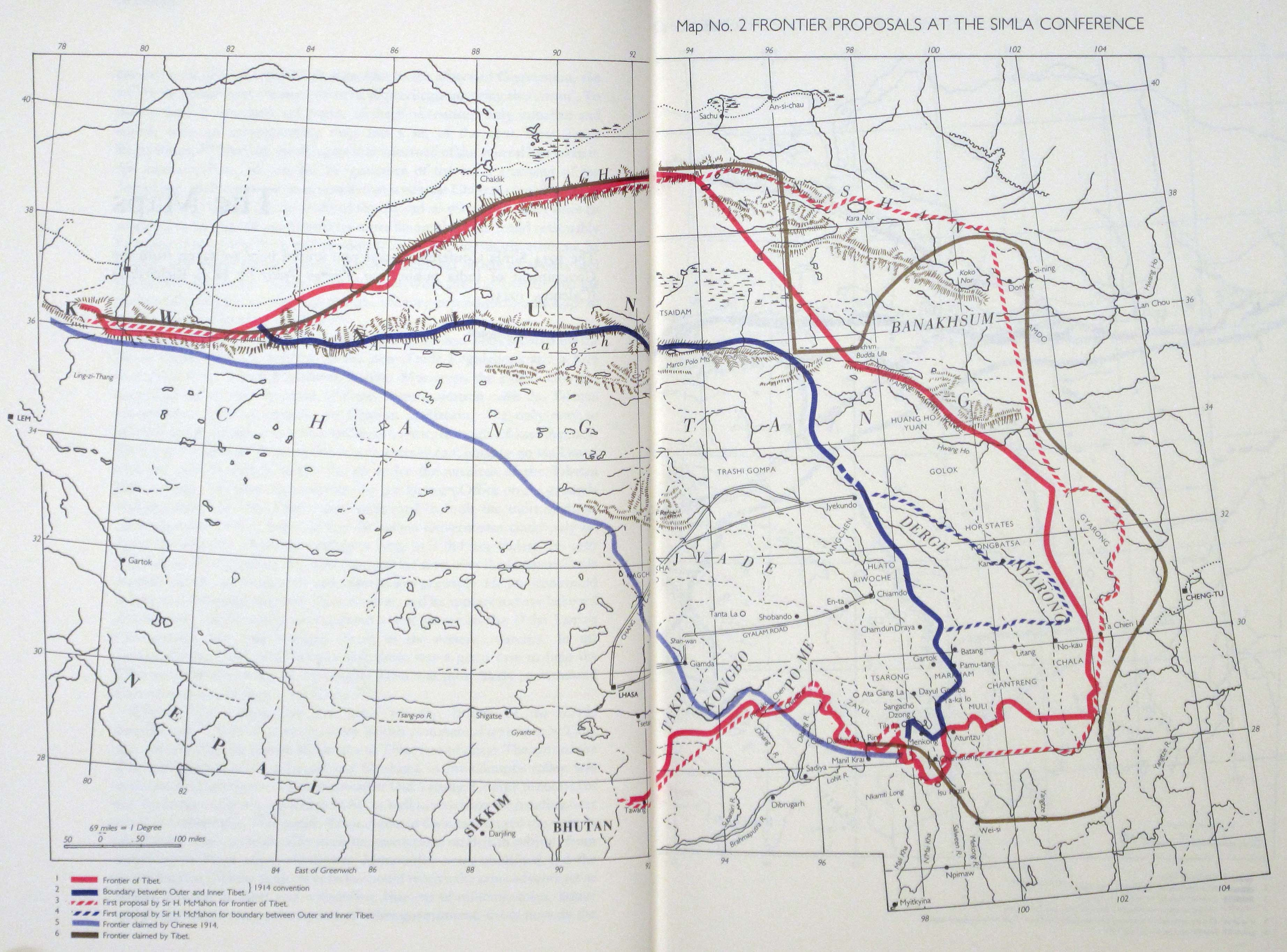
In addition to the two boundaries, this map by Hugh Richardson shows Henry McMahon's first proposals as dashed lines, and the Tibetan (brown) and Chinese (light blue) claims
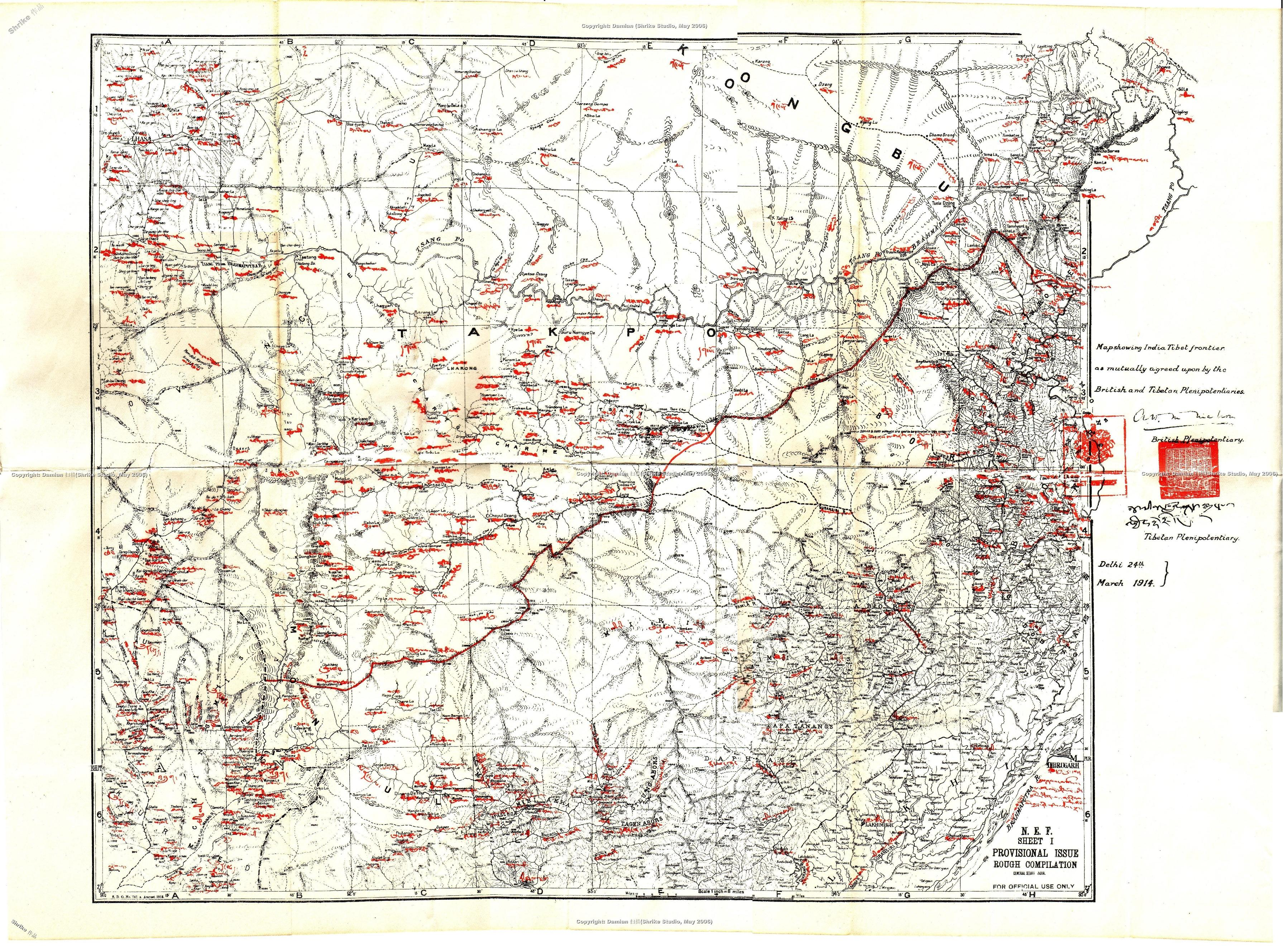
McMahon Line western part

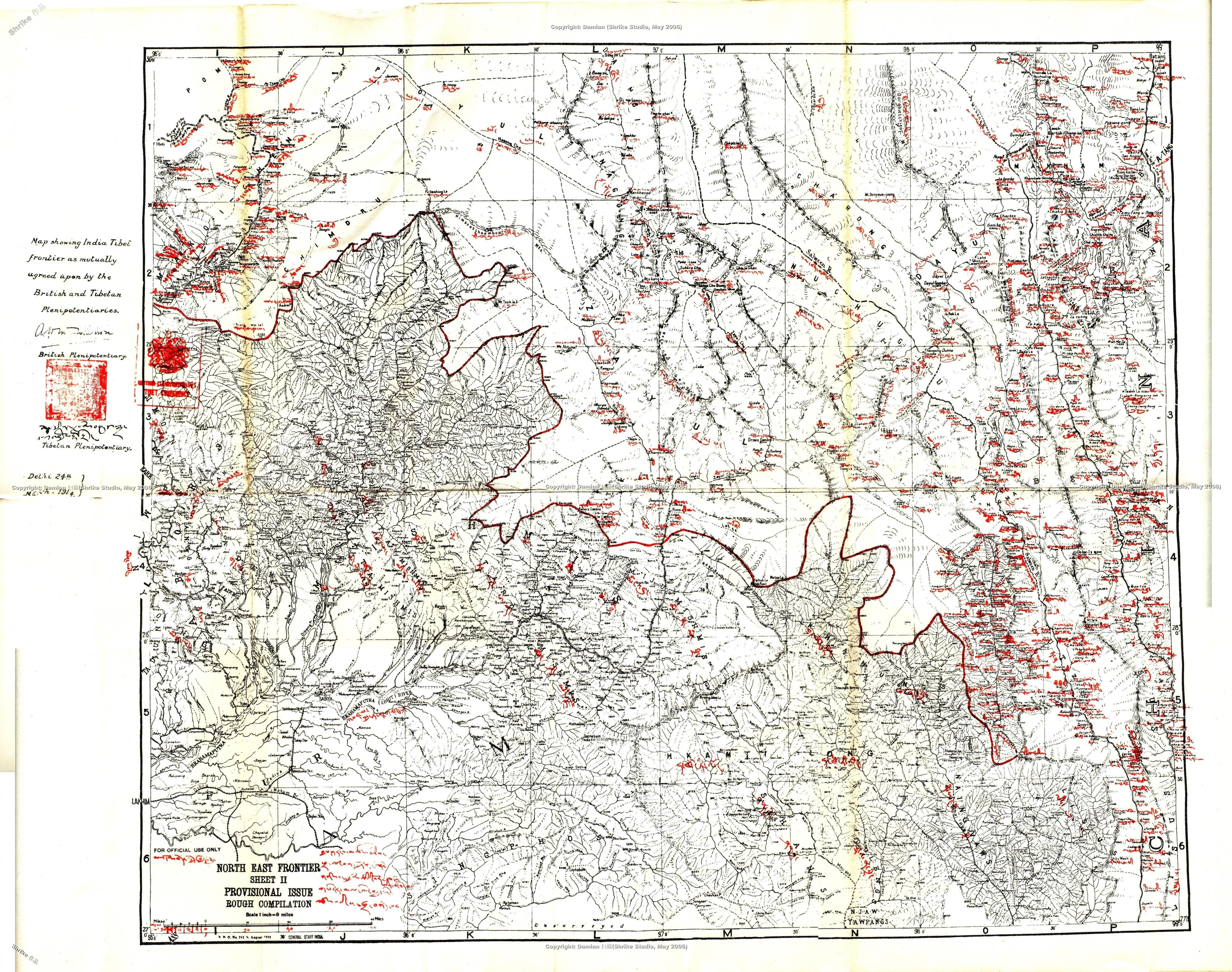
McMahon Line eastern part

== See also ==
- Treaty of Kyakhta (1915)
- Imperialism in Asia
