= Archibald Rose =

British diplomat, explorer, and businessman

Archie Rose CIE FRGS
- Born: 14 July 1879
- Died: 3 March 1961 (aged 81); Framlingham, Suffolk, England
- Education: Bedford Modern School
- Alma mater: King's College, London

Charles Archibald Walker Rose CIE FRGS (1879–1961) was a British diplomat, explorer and businessman in China during the early twentieth century. Rose's obituary in The Times stated that he was 'a lovable and saint-like man. His dandiacal appearance and his taste for drollery were unsure guides to his true character, in which the dominant strain was a sort of earnest but unobtrusive chivalry'.

== Life ==
Archie Rose, the son of Thomas Edward Rose, was born on 14 July 1879. He was educated at Bedford Modern School and King's College, London, before becoming a student interpreter at the British Legation in Peking in 1897.

Rose was awarded the China War Medal and clasp for his role in the defence of western embassies during the Boxer Rebellion in 1900. and provided a lively eye-witness account of life in the Legations during the sieges, for example from Monday 25 June 1900:

'These people are the most shockingly bad shots fortunately for us. If a quarter of their shots and shells came anywhere near our walls and buildings we should all have been in suitable resting-places long ago. They must be utter rotters. If they had any pluck there are several places where they could get into the compound and smash us easily. Every day we are fortifying, trenching, barricading, doing everything that is possible, whilst they stay at a safe distance and blaze away like fun'.

In 1903 Rose was appointed British Consul at Chongqing, and subsequently became consul at Yantai, Ningbo, Hangzhou and Tengyue. He also travelled extensively in China, Mongolia and Central Asia and collaborated on an ethnological study of the tribes of the Chinese-Burmese border region.

In 1911 Rose was appointed CIE and in the same year returned to England to attend an advanced course in Chinese at King's College, Cambridge. Here, he befriended John Maynard Keynes and the two were to maintain a long-running correspondence. He was also elected a Fellow of the Royal Geographical Society for his exploration work.

On his return to Asia, Rose served as the Foreign Office representative at the tripartite conference on the subject of the independence of Tibet held at Simla over the winter of 1913-14 and which led to the Simla Accord. In 1915 he was Commercial Attaché at Shanghai and from 1917 he held the same position at the Peking embassy. During this period he also developed an enthusiasm for ballroom-dancing to the extent that he was referred to by his friend George Ernest Morrison, The Times China Correspondent, as 'Professor of dancing and deportment in the department of commerce'.

Rose retired from the Foreign Office with the rank of First Secretary in 1921, and embarked on a career in business in the Far East; becoming a Director of British American Tobacco and the Chartered Bank of India, Australia and China. He retired to England at Framlingham, Suffolk, and became a JP for the county. He died on 3 March 1961.
