= Shaqiong =

Shaqiong (沙琼), or Shaqiong Deng Village (沙琼僜人村) in full, is a village in Zayü County, Tibet Autonomous Region, China.

The life style of the aboriginal tribal Deng people has been changed a lot in Zayü County. The religion of the Deng people is an eclectic mixture of Deng animism and Lamaist Buddhism. In the 1960s, the Chinese government relocated the Deng people in the plains from the mountains. In the 1980s, lands and cattle's were distributed to the Deng people. Agricultural Bank of China started to promote microcredit in 2001, providing the Deng people the access to modern agricultural facilities.

Tourist attractions in Shaqiong have been being developed since 2003. Highways have been built in the Shaqiong village with help of the Guangdong Province. However, foreigners were not allowed to enter Zayü as of 2011.
