= Goyul =

Goyul Township 古玉乡
- Township
- Goyü Township
- Location in the Tibet AR
- Coordinates: 29°08′42″N 97°13′19″E
- Country: People's Republic of China
- Autonomous region: Tibet
- Prefecture-level city: Nyingchi
- County: Zayü
- Elevation: 3,300 m (10,800 ft)
- Time zone: UTC+8 (China Standard)

Goyul (Tibetan: མགོ་ཡུལ་ཤང, Wylie: mgo yul shang) or Goyü (Chinese: 古玉乡; pinyin: Gǔ yù xiāng) is a township located in the Zayul County, Nyingchi Prefecture in eastern Tibet Autonomous Region, China.

The centre of the township is the town Sangachu Dzong (Tibetan: གསང་སྔགས་ཆོས་རྫོང, Wylie: gsang sngags chos rdzong, THL: sang ngak chö dzong; Chinese: 桑昂曲宗; pinyin: Sāng áng qū zōng). It is now referred to as Goyul Town. It lies at an altitude of 3,300 m (10,800 ft), at the location where Zang Chu (Sangachu), the eastern source stream of Zayul Chu, descends into its valley. (In current European terminology, Zang Chu is in fact regarded as the main Zayul Chu, and the western headwater Kangri Karpo Chu is regarded as its tributary. However, the Tibetans regard both the rivers with equal status.)

A large plain is formed near Goyul, where three or more headwaters of Zang Chu meet. According to the British explorer Frank Kingdon Ward, four villages were formed in the plain, one of which is traditionally called Gochen (Tibetan: མགོ་ཆེན, Wylie: mgo chen; Chinese: 古井村; pinyin: Gǔjǐng cūn), which has effectively lent its name to the entire region. The Sangachu Dzong fort and monastery stand on an elevated shoulder of the plain, while the river itself flows in a deep trench.

Prior to the Chinese administration of Tibet, Sangachu Dzong served as the capital of the Zayul County, except for the coldest winter months, during which the Dzongpön move to the village of Shigatang (Shika) near Rima. The capital has since been moved to Kyigang, approximately 60 km (37 mi) downstream on Zayul Chu, and now bears the name "Zayul Town".

== See also ==
- List of towns and villages in Tibet

== Bibliography ==
- Kaulback, Ronald (March 1934), "The Assam Border of Tibet", The Geographical Journal, LXXXIII (3) – via archive.org
- Kingdon Ward, F.; Smith, Malcolm (November 1934), "The Himalaya East of the Tsangpo", The Geographical Journal, 84 (5): 369–394, doi:10.2307/1786924, JSTOR 1786924
- Kingdon Ward, F. (1937), A Plant Hunter in Tibet, London: Jonathan Cape – via archive.org
