= Rima, Tibet =

Village in Tibet, China

Rima རི་མ
- Village
- Location in Tibet
- Coordinates: 28°26′08″N 97°03′28″E
- Country: People's Republic of China
- Region: Tibet
- Prefecture: Nyingchi
- County: Zayü
- Township: Xiachayu
- Time zone: UTC+8 (China Standard)

Rima (Tibetan: རི་མ, Wylie: ri ma; Chinese: 力馬; pinyin: Lì mǎ) is the former capital of the Zayul in the southeastern Tibet Autonomous Region of China. It is on the border with India's Arunachal Pradesh at the confluence of the Rongto Chu and Zayul Chu rivers, which join to form the Zayul River (or Lohit River) before it flows into Arunachal Pradesh. Rima was a notable border trading town, which the British contemplated as a location for a trade mart in the Lhasa Convention.

== History ==
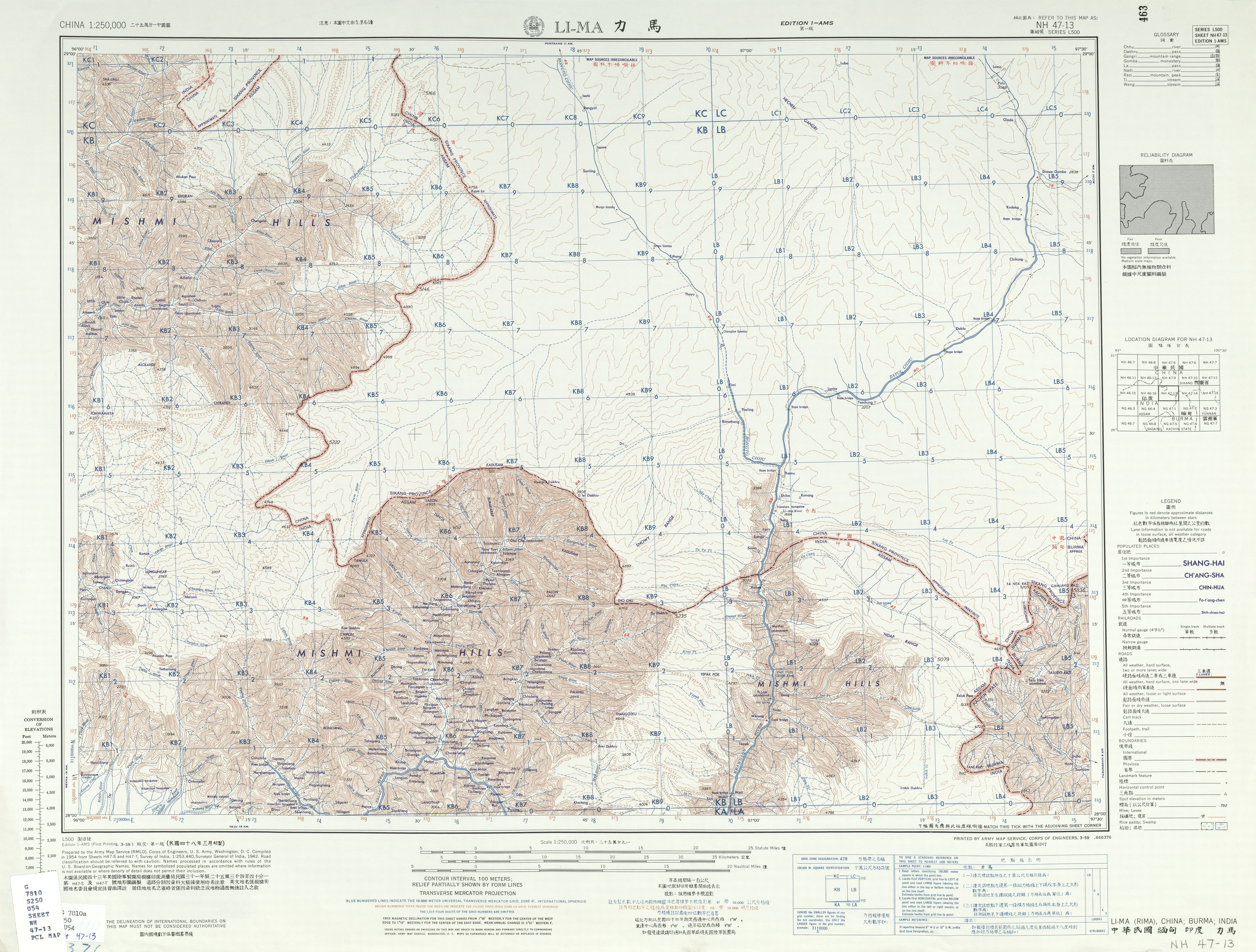
Map of the region around Rima (labelled as Li-ma 力馬). The two branch rivers Rongto Chhu and Zayul Chhu join here before entering India. (US AMS, 1954)

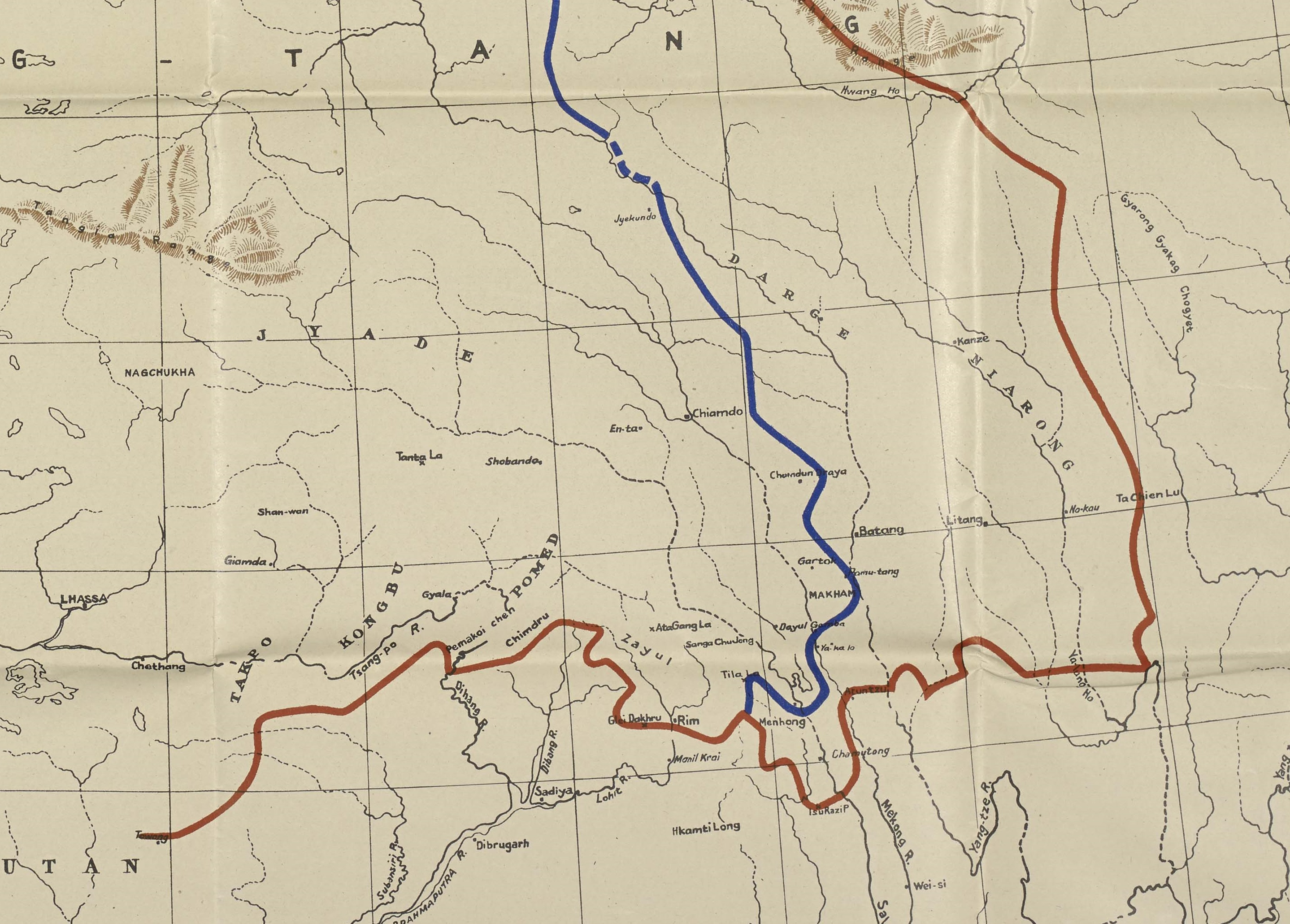
Western and Easter Kham divided by a blue line border (Simla Convention map, 1914)

The pretty much continuous ridgeline bordering the Rongto Chu valley has served as the traditional boundary between the Zayul County of Tibet and the adjoining Assam Himalayan tribal region, populated by Mishmis. Rima is to the north of the ridgeline and is a historical town of the Zayul County, which also served as a border-trading post for the Mishmis.

In 1882, the native Indian explorer Kishen Singh (known by his initials "A. K.") travelled to Rima from the Tibetan side and spent several weeks in the Zayul valley. In 1885–1886, the assistant political officer of British Raj for the Assam tribal region travelled up the Lohit River (as Zayul River is known in India) to a point very close to Rima. He is said to have been one of the first Europeans to have reached that far without any mishap. During 1907–1908, another assistant political officer, Noel Williamson, reached up to Sa Ti, about 35 miles south of Rima. Williamson saw good prospects of trade with Rima if a good bridle path between Sadiya and Rima could be developed.

At this time the tribal Kham region of eastern Tibet was divided between Tibetan and Chinese control, with the eastern Kham centred around Batang controlled by China and the wetern Kham region centred around Chamdo controlled by Lhasa. The British expedition to Tibet in 1904 created anxiety in Qing China, and provoked them to establish firm control over the eastern Kham (known as "march country" through which Chinese forces would march to Tibet). This led to a Batang uprising in 1905, and the appointment of Zhao Erfeng (notorious as "Butcher Zhao") as the frontier commissioner, who crushed the uprising and started a brutal sinification campaign in the Kham region. Zhao intended to integrate both western and eastern Kham regions into a new Chinese province called "Xikang". The province was to incorporate Kham proper, but also the adjoining Tibetan counties such as Zayul and Pome.

== Bibliography ==
- Ho, Dahpon David (April 2008), "The Men Who Would Not Be Amban and the One Who Would: Four Frontline Officials and Qing Tibet Policy, 1905–1911", Modern China, 34 (2): 210–246, doi:10.1177/0097700407312856
- Kingdon Ward, F.; Smith, Malcolm (November 1934), "The Himalaya East of the Tsangpo", The Geographical Journal, 84 (5): 369–394, doi:10.2307/1786924, JSTOR 1786924
- Lamb, Alastair (1966), The McMahon Line: a Study in the Relations Between, India, China and Tibet, 1904 to 1914, Vol. 2: Hardinge, McMahon and the Simla Conference, Routledge & K. Paul – via archive.org
- Mehra, Parshotam (1974), The McMahon Line and After: A Study of the Triangular Contest on India's North-eastern Frontier Between Britain, China and Tibet, 1904-47, Macmillan, ISBN 9780333157374 – via archive.org
- Wang, Xiuyu (2011), China's Last Imperial Frontier: Late Qing Expansion in Sichuan's Tibetan Borderlands, Lexington Books, ISBN 978-0-7391-6809-7
