= Cawarong =

Cawarong ཚ་བ་རོང་། Tsawarong
- Town
- Cawarong
- Interactive map of Cawarong
- Coordinates: 28°28′30″N 98°28′00″E
- Country: China
- Province: Tibet
- Prefecture: Nyingchi
- County: Zayü

Area
  - Total: 4,616.94 km^{2} (1,782.61 sq mi)
- Elevation: 2,003 m (6,572 ft)

Population (2004)
  - Total: 6,788
- Time zone: UTC+8
- Area code: +86

Cawarong or Tsawarong (Tibetan: ཚ་བ་རོང་།, Wylie: tsha ba rong, ZWPY: Cawarong; Chinese: 察瓦龙; pinyin: Cháwǎlóng) is a township in Zayü County, Tibet Autonomous Region of China. It lies at an altitude of 2,003 metres (6,574 feet). Formerly known as Tsarung, it was traditionally a southern gateway and trade route into Tibet from Yunnan, forming part of the tea-horse road (茶马古道 Chá-Mǎ Gǔdào). It is a very arid area with little rainfall. An unsealed road cut into the cliffs above the Nu River links it to Bingzhongluo in Yunnan. Cawarong is a major step on the Khora of the Khawa Karpo.

== Government ==
Its Chinese zoning code is 542626202.

=== Subdivisions ===
The town comprises 28 villages: Hongdong Village, Zharan Village, Gangzang Village, Zuobu Village, Qianzhongwa Village, Kangran Village, Songta Village, Abing Village, Zhan Village, Changxi Village, and Chuni Village, Kadi Village, Gerri Village, Laka Village, Buba Village, Babu Village, Gongka Village, Guoda Village, Muba Village, Mengzha Village, Shabu Village, LP Village, Zalang Village, Deng Xu Village, Xueba Village, Zhula Village, Wabu Village, and Gebu Village.

== See also ==
- List of towns and villages in Tibet

== External links and references ==
- Photoblog of Chawalong visit
