= Mianzimu =

Mountain in Yunnan, China

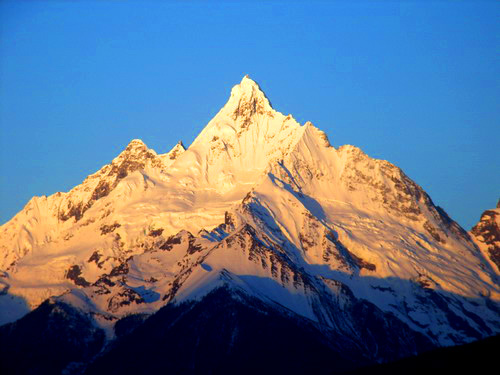

Highest point
- Elevation: 6,054 m (19,862 ft)
- Prominence: 1,412 m (4,633 ft)
- Parent peak: Kawagebo

Geography
- Location: Yunnan, China
- Parent range: Meili Xue Shan

Climbing
- First ascent: Never climbed

Mianzimu (缅茨姆) is a summit in the Meili Xue Shan of Yunnan province, China. At 6,054 metres (19,862 ft), it is the fourth highest peak in the range (after Kawagebo, Cogar Laka and Nairi Denka), and is located at the southern end of the range. It is regarded as one of the world's most beautiful mountains.
