= Dhola–Sadiya Bridge =

Bridge between Assam and Arunachal Pradesh, India

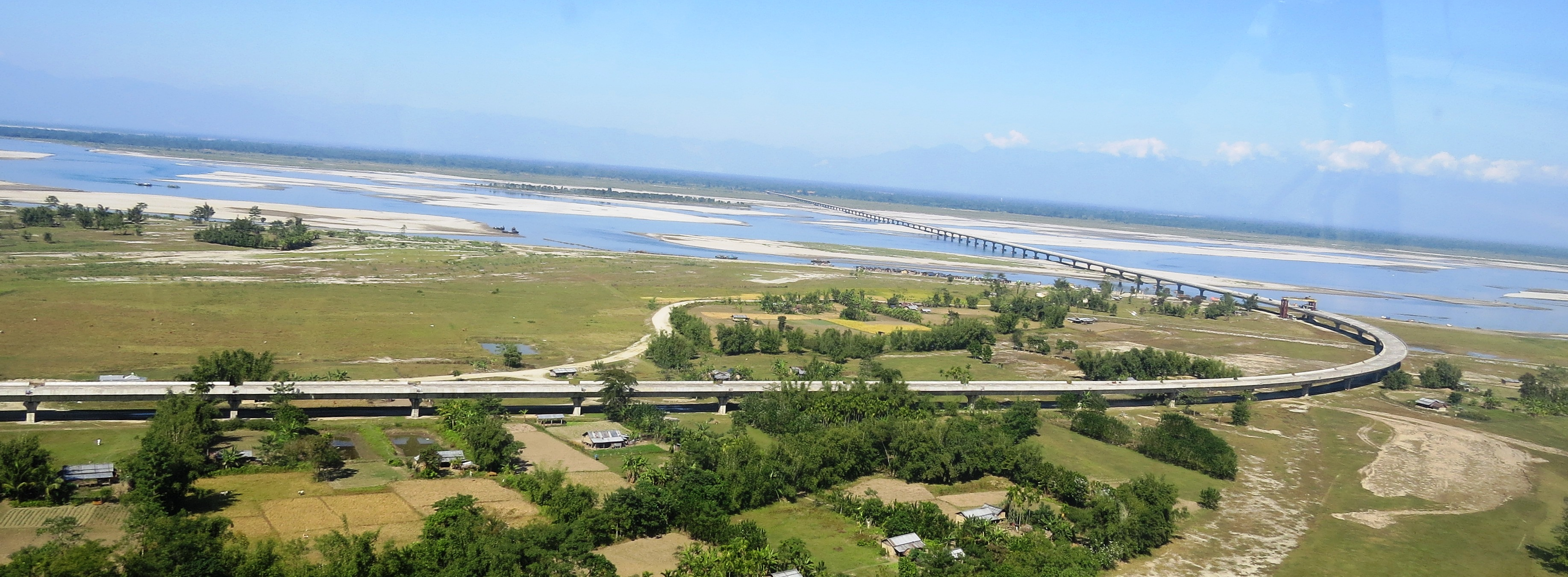
- Coordinates: 27°47′55″N 95°40′34″E
- Carries: Motor vehicles
- Crosses: Lohit River
- Locale: Dhola–Sadiya, Assam, India
- Official name: Bhupen Hazarika Setu
- Maintained by: Ministry of Road Transport and Highways

Characteristics
- Design: Beam bridge
- Total length: 9.15 km (5.69 mi)
- Width: 12.9 m (42 ft)
- Longest span: 50 m (160 ft)
- No. of spans: 183

History
- Constructed by: Navayuga Engineering
- Construction start: November 2011
- Construction end: 10 March 2017
- Opened: 26 May 2017

Location
- Interactive map of Dhola–Sadiya Bridge

The Dhola-Sadiya Bridge, officially known as Bhupen Hazarika Setu, is a beam bridge connecting the villages of Dhola and Sadiya in Tinsukia district of the Indian state of Assam. The bridge spans the Lohit River, a major tributary of the Brahmaputra, and provides access to certain parts of Arunachal Pradesh that lie to the north and northeast of Assam. The bridge facilitates the first permanent road connection between the northern Assam and eastern Arunachal Pradesh. At 9.15 km (5.69 mi) in length, it is the second longest bridge in India over water.

With the bridge located close to the India-China border, the bridge is designed to facilitate the movement of Indian Armed Forces to the border state of Arunachal Pradesh. As China has disputed India's claim to Arunachal Pradesh, the bridge is an important tactical asset in the ongoing dispute. The bridge has been designed to handle the weight of 60-tonne (130,000-pound) main battle tanks of the Indian Army.

== Construction ==
The Ministry of Road Transport and Highways started a feasibility study of the project in August 2003. In January 2009, the bridge was approved for construction funded by the Government of India. Construction began in November 2011 as a public-private partnership with Navayuga Engineering, with an expected completion in 2015. However, due to construction delays and cost overruns, the bridge's completion date was pushed into 2017. The project cost around ₹10 billion (equivalent to ₹14 billion or US$146 million in 2023) and construction took over five years to complete. The bridge was inaugurated on 26 May 2017 by Indian prime minister Narendra Modi in the presence of Nitin Gadkari, the minister of road transport and highways. The bridge was named after Bhupen Hazarika, an artist and filmmaker from Assam.

== See also ==
- List of bridges on Brahmaputra River
- List of longest bridges above water in India
- List of longest bridges in the world
