= Zayu County =

Zayul County 察隅县 • རྫ་ཡུལ་རྫོང་། Dzayul, Chayul, Tsayul, Zayü, Chayu, Tsayu
- County
- Zayü County
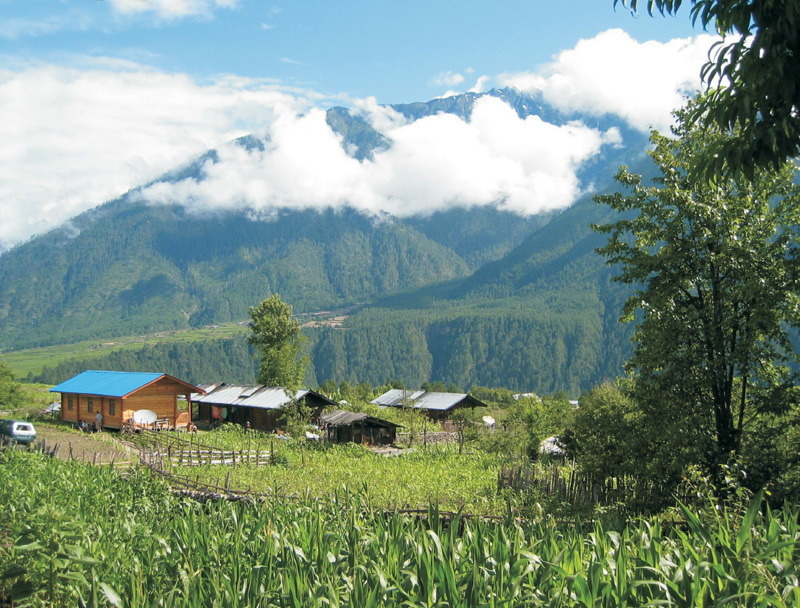

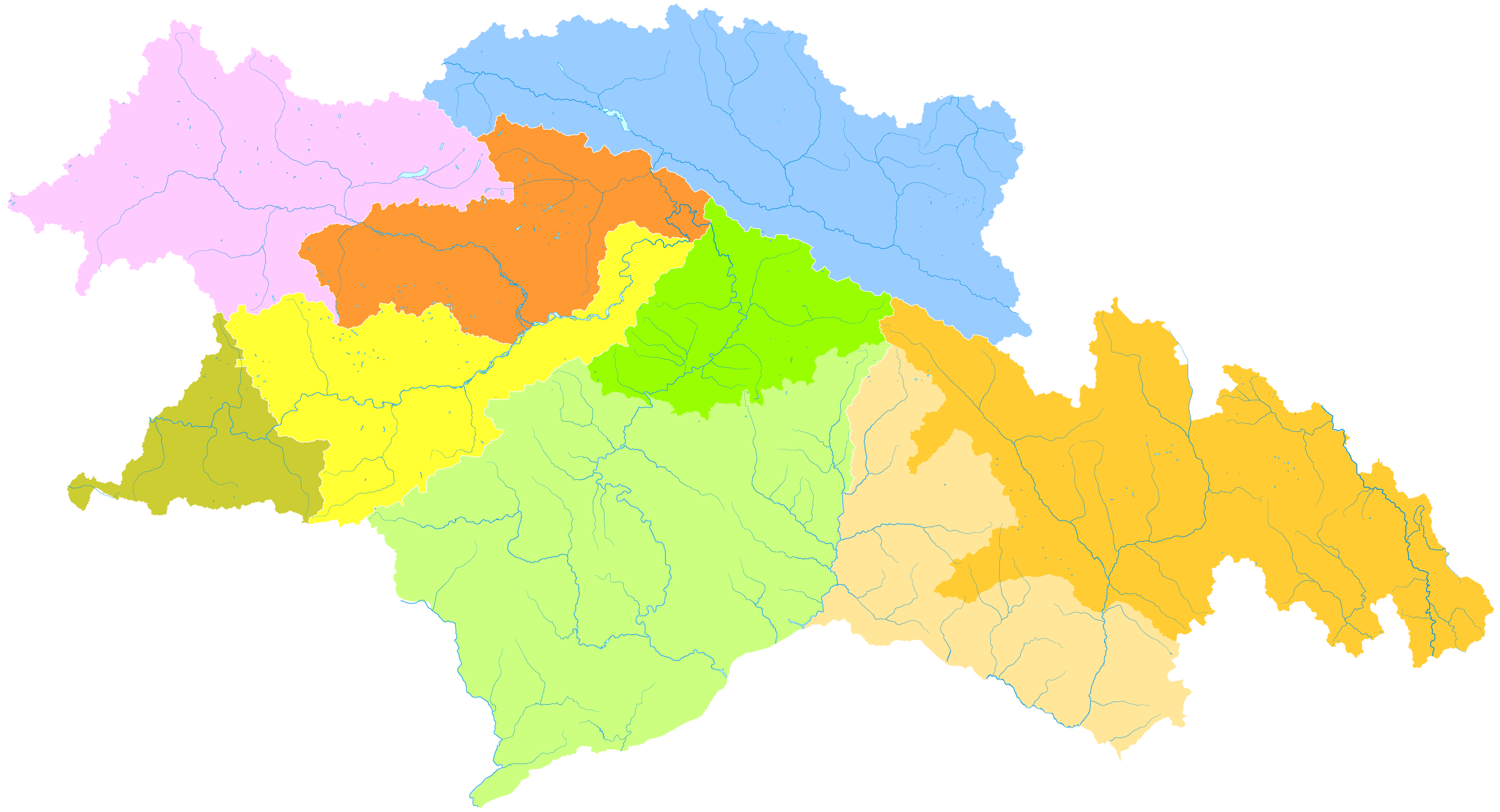
- Location of Zayü County in Nyingchi (in Sunglow color; disputed area contained)

- Location in the Tibet Autonomous Region Zayul (China)
- Coordinates: 28°39′40″N 97°28′01″E
- Country: China
- Autonomous region: Tibet
- Prefecture-level city: Nyingchi
- Seat: Zhowagoin Town

Area (de facto controlled)
  - Total: 19,000 km^{2} (7,300 sq mi)

Population (2020)
  - Total: 28,237
  - Density: 1.5/km^{2} (3.8/sq mi)
- Time zone: UTC+8 (China Standard)
- Postal code: 860600
- Website: www.chayu.gov.cn

Zayu County

Chinese name
- Simplified Chinese: 察隅县
- Traditional Chinese: 察隅縣
Transcriptions
Standard Mandarin
- Hanyu Pinyin: Cháyú Xiàn

Tibetan name
- Tibetan: རྫ་ཡུལ་རྫོང་།
Transcriptions
- Wylie: rdza yul rdzong
- Tibetan Pinyin: Zayü Zong

Zayul County (Note: Alternative spellings include Dzayul, Chayul and Tsayul, as well as their Chinese variants Zayü, Chayu and Tsayu.) (Tibetan: རྫ་ཡུལ་རྫོང) or Zayü (Chinese: 察隅县) is a county in the Nyingchi Prefecture in the southeastern part of the Tibet Autonomous Region, China.

The historical Zayul region is marked by the basin of the Zayul River, with its two branches: Rongto Chu (or the western Zayul River) and Zayul Chu (or the eastern Zayul River). The two branches join near the town of Rima. After the junction, the Zayul river enters India's Arunachal Pradesh where it is called Lohit.

The Zayul county borders India and Burma to the south and China's Yunnan province to the southeast. To the northeast lies the Pome County and to the northwest the Medog County. The county's headquarter located at Kyigang Village, Zhowagoin Town.

== History ==
During the period of the Tibetan Empire, a government office was set up here. In 1371, the Phagmodrupa dynasty established the Kemai Zong. In 1912, Kemai County was established, and the county seat was moved to Gyigang (skyid sgang), which was under the jurisdiction of the Governor of Domai of Tibet. In 1954, it was assigned to Qamdo Prefecture (昌都专区), and in 1960, it was changed to Sangngak Cho County (gsang sngag chos rdzong, 桑昂曲县). In May 1966, it was renamed as Zayu County. The county seat was located in Zhowagoin Town, and it was under the jurisdiction of the prefecture-level Qamdo Region (昌都地区). In 1986, it was assigned to Nyingchi Prefecture.

== Geography ==
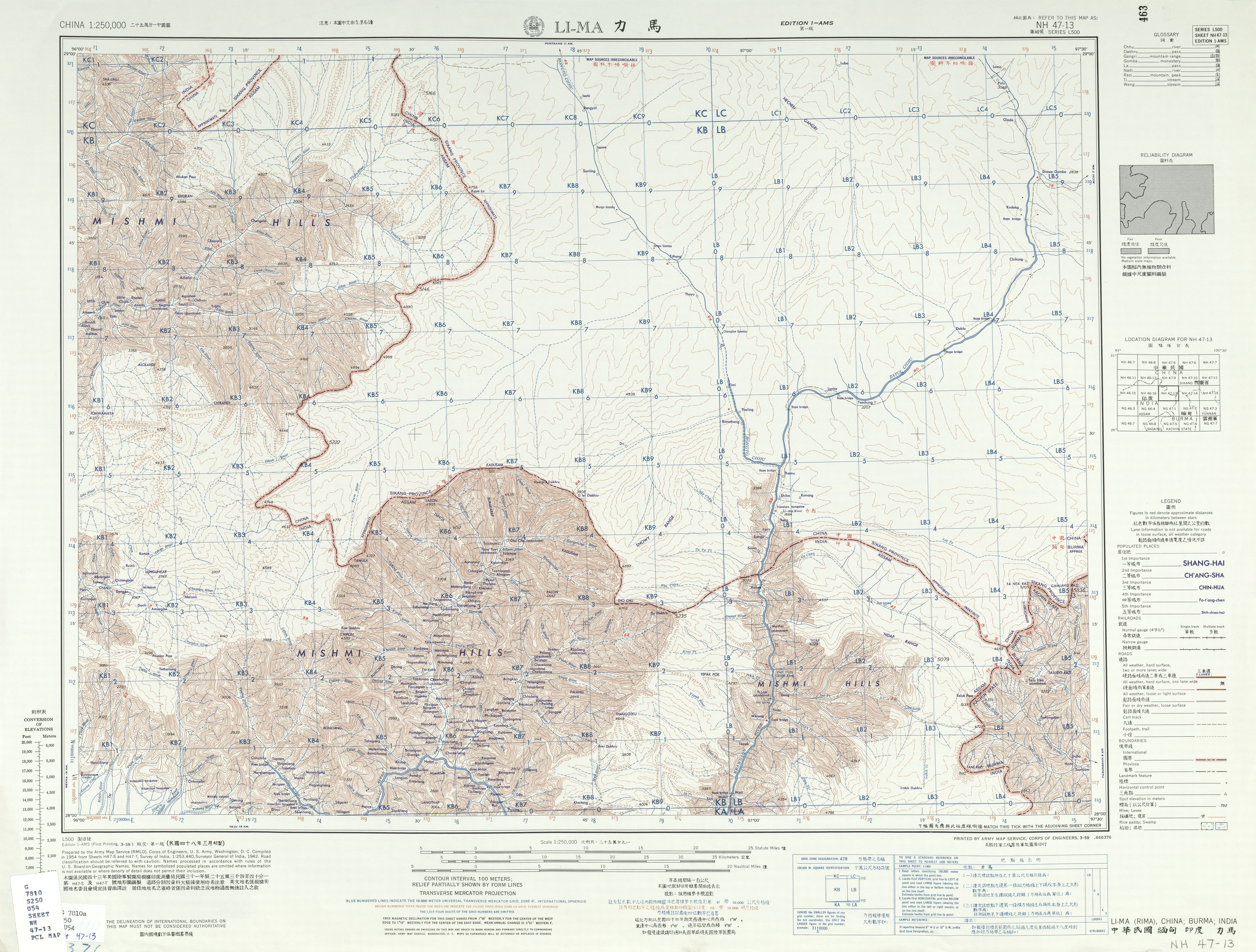
Map of the region around Rima (labelled as Li-ma 力馬). The two branch rivers Rongto Chhu and Zayul Chhu join here before entering India. (US AMS, 1954)

Zayul County is located in an area of highly varying topography, lying just south of the Tibetan Plateau in the mountainous region east of the Himalayas where the Transhimalayas transition to the Hengduan Mountains. Specifically, the county straddles the southern parts of the Baxoila Range, the eastern parts of the Kangri Karpo mountains, and the eastern parts of the Mishmi Hills. Elevations generally decrease from northwest to southeast, with a maximal variation of 3,600 metres (11,800 ft): in the county, including Arunachal Pradesh areas near the southern border have an elevation of 1,400 metres (4,600 ft), while there are 10 peaks over 5,000 metres (16,000 ft), the highest being Kawagarbo in the Meili Xue Shan at 6,740 metres (22,110 ft). The county has an average elevation of 2,300 metres (7,500 ft). The primary rivers are the Zayul River through the central parts of the county and Nu River (Salween) in the east.

The county has an area of 31,305 square kilometres (12,087 sq mi). Besides India, Burma, and Yunnan, it borders Zogang County to the north and Mêdog County to the southwest.

== Economy ==
In 2020, the GDP of Zayu County is 1.144 billion yuan, and the arable land area is 2,787 hectares (6,890 acres). The main agricultural products are barley, wheat, rice, corn, soybean, eggplant, cucumber, pepper, rapeseed, peanut, sugar cane, tomato, mandarin orange and orange. Raising pigs, cattle, cattle, sheep, goats, etc. in animal husbandry. Economic forests include spruce, nanmu, fir, birch, sandalwood, camphor, Yunnan pine, Huashan pine, yew, spring bud wood, etc. In 1959, the Rancha Highway connected with the Sichuan-Tibet Highway was built.

== Population ==
According to China's seventh national census in 2020, Zayu County's permanent population was 28,237, including 14,900 males, 13,337 females, 6,459 aged 0–14, 19,235 aged 15–59, 2,543 aged 60 and over, and 22,105 Tibetans. There are 3593 Han people, 1573 Teng people and 966 other ethnic minorities. The urban population is 6,221, and the rural population is 22,016. There are 7,787 people in Zhuwagen Township, 3,544 people in Upper Chayu Township, 6,213 people in Lower Zayu Township, 6,158 people in Chawalong Township, 1,915 people in Gula Township, and 2,620 people in Guyu Township.

== Climate ==
Owing to its moderate elevation (for Tibet), Zayul County has a subtropical highland climate (Köppen Cwb), a rarity in Tibet, with mild and quite dry winters, and warm, rainy summers. The rainy season lasts from March to September, and June through August each average more than 20 days of rainfall per month. The monthly daily average temperature ranges from 4.7 °C (40.5 °F) in January to 19 °C (66.2 °F) in July, and the annual mean is 12.1 °C (53.8 °F). The frost-free period is 280 days annually. Here, the diurnal temperature range is not large, maxing out at 16.8 °C (30.2 °F) in November. Its climate is well-suited to support a variety of agricultural and forestry products.

Climate data for Zayü, elevation 2,328 m (7,638 ft), (1991–2020 normals, extremes 1964–present)
Month	Jan	Feb	Mar	Apr	May	Jun	Jul	Aug	Sep	Oct	Nov	Dec	Year
Record high °C (°F)	21.7 (71.1)	22.0 (71.6)	26.7 (80.1)	28.9 (84.0)	30.2 (86.4)	32.3 (90.1)	32.6 (90.7)	31.9 (89.4)	31.5 (88.7)	29.5 (85.1)	23.8 (74.8)	19.8 (67.6)	32.6 (90.7)
Mean daily maximum °C (°F)	12.0 (53.6)	13.2 (55.8)	14.7 (58.5)	17.5 (63.5)	21.4 (70.5)	24.3 (75.7)	25.0 (77.0)	25.1 (77.2)	23.9 (75.0)	20.8 (69.4)	16.9 (62.4)	13.5 (56.3)	19.0 (66.2)
Daily mean °C (°F)	4.7 (40.5)	6.5 (43.7)	8.3 (46.9)	11.1 (52.0)	15.0 (59.0)	18.3 (64.9)	19.1 (66.4)	19.0 (66.2)	17.7 (63.9)	13.4 (56.1)	8.7 (47.7)	5.5 (41.9)	12.3 (54.1)
Mean daily minimum °C (°F)	−0.2 (31.6)	1.8 (35.2)	4.0 (39.2)	6.8 (44.2)	10.8 (51.4)	14.5 (58.1)	15.5 (59.9)	15.3 (59.5)	14.1 (57.4)	8.9 (48.0)	3.7 (38.7)	0.4 (32.7)	8.0 (46.3)
Record low °C (°F)	−5.5 (22.1)	−5.0 (23.0)	−2.4 (27.7)	−0.2 (31.6)	2.5 (36.5)	8.0 (46.4)	9.5 (49.1)	8.5 (47.3)	6.0 (42.8)	0.9 (33.6)	−2.9 (26.8)	−4.4 (24.1)	−5.5 (22.1)
Average precipitation mm (inches)	14.7 (0.58)	28.7 (1.13)	90.1 (3.55)	117.1 (4.61)	88.4 (3.48)	68.0 (2.68)	113.3 (4.46)	103.9 (4.09)	71.3 (2.81)	49.1 (1.93)	15.4 (0.61)	6.7 (0.26)	766.7 (30.19)
Average precipitation days (≥ 0.1 mm)	5.6	8.8	16.1	17.4	17.9	18.7	21.8	22.0	17.8	10.4	4.8	2.1	163.4
Average snowy days	3.7	2.8	1.8	0.8	0	0	0	0	0	0.1	0.1	1.0	10.3
Average relative humidity (%)	56	59	66	69	69	72	75	75	73	67	60	55	66
Mean monthly sunshine hours	134.0	113.6	115.6	108.0	117.4	111.0	115.6	124.3	125.1	140.8	143.7	145.2	1,494.3
Percentage possible sunshine	41	36	31	28	28	27	27	31	34	40	45	46	35
Source 1: China Meteorological AdministrationAll-time August highall-time November high
Source 2: Weather China

== Environment ==
The central parts of Zayul County contain a large isolated section of the Northeastern Himalayan subalpine conifer forests throughout the Zayul River valley and its tributaries. The highland areas of Zayul contain Eastern Himalayan alpine shrub and meadows. The eastern parts of the county are classified as Nujiang Langcang Gorge alpine conifer and mixed forests. There are, however, extremely dry areas within the Nu Valley in Zayul that support mostly succulents.

Gecko Hemiphyllodactylus zayuensis, named after Zayul, is only known from the county.

== Administrative divisions ==
Zayul County has administration over three towns and three townships:

Name	Chinese	Hanyu Pinyin	Tibetan	Wylie
Towns
Zhowagoin Town (Drowagön)	竹瓦根镇	Zhúwǎgēn zhèn	འགྲོ་བ་དགོན་གྲོང་རྡལ།	'gro ba dgon grong rdal
Zayürongdoi Town (Shangchayu, Upper Zayü)	上察隅镇	Shàng Cháyú zhèn	རྫ་ཡུལ་རོང་སྟོད་གྲོང་རྡལ།	rdza yul rong stod grong rdal
Zayürongmai Town (Xiachayu, Lower Zayü)	下察隅镇	Xià Cháyú zhèn	རྫ་ཡུལ་རོང་སྨད་གྲོང་རྡལ།	rdza yul rong smad grong rdal
Townships
Tsawarong Township	察瓦龙乡	Cháwǎlóng xiāng	ཚ་བ་རོང་ཤང་།	tsha ba rong shang
Golag Township	古拉乡	Gǔlā xiāng	མགོ་ལག་ཤང་།	mgo lag shang
Goyul Township	古玉乡	Gǔyù xiāng	མགོ་ཡུལ་ཤང་།	mgo yul shang
* includes areas claimed but currently under control of the Indian state of Arunachal Pradesh.

== Sino-Indian border dispute ==
China claims the entire Arunachal Pradesh as being part of Tibet, especially the Walong region in the Zayul River valley below Rima. The area was one of the theatres of the 1962 Sino-Indian War.

== Bibliography ==
- Kingdon Ward, F.; Smith, Malcolm (November 1934), "The Himalaya East of the Tsangpo", The Geographical Journal, 84 (5): 369–394, Bibcode:1934GeogJ..84..369W, doi:10.2307/1786924, JSTOR 1786924
- Lamb, Alastair (1966), The McMahon Line: a Study in the Relations Between, India, China and Tibet, 1904 to 1914, Vol. 2: Hardinge, McMahon and the Simla Conference, Routledge & K. Paul
- Mehra, Parshotam (1974), The McMahon Line and After: A Study of the Triangular Contest on India's North-eastern Frontier Between Britain, China and Tibet, 1904-47, Macmillan, ISBN 9780333157374 – via archive.org
