= Golag =

Golag Township 古拉乡
- Township
- Location in the Tibet AR
- Coordinates: 29°01′08″N 97°57′12″E
- Country: People's Republic of China
- Autonomous region: Tibet
- Prefecture-level city: Nyingchi
- County: Zayü

Area
  - Total: 3,318 km^{2} (1,281 sq mi)

Population (2005)
  - Total: 2,977
  - Density: 0.8972/km^{2} (2.324/sq mi)
  - Major Nationalities: Tibetan
  - Regional dialect: Tibetan language
- Time zone: UTC+8 (CST)

Golag (Chinese: 古拉; pinyin: Gǔlā) is a township in the northeast of Zayü County, Nyingchi, in the southeast of the Tibet Autonomous Region.

== See also ==
- List of towns and villages in Tibet
