= Shangchayu =

Shangzayü 上察隅镇
- Town
- Location in Tibet
- Coordinates: 28°43′14″N 96°46′39″E
- Country: People's Republic of China
- Region: Tibet
- Prefecture: Nyingchi
- County: Zayü
- Elevation: 1,927 m (6,322 ft)

Population (2003)
  - Total: 3,002
- Time zone: UTC+8 (China Standard)

Shangzayü (Chinese: 上察隅; pinyin: Shàngcháyú; lit. 'upper Zayü'; Standard Tibetan: རྫ་ཡུལ) is a town of Zayü County, in southeastern Tibet Autonomous Region, People's Republic of China (PRC), located in a deep river valley 68 km (42 mi) from the county seat and bordering India's Arunachal Pradesh, which is claimed by the PRC, to the south and west. As of 2003, it has a population of 3002, and as of 2011, it has 16 villages under its administration.
