= Hemiphyllodactylus zayuensis =

Scientific classification
- Kingdom: Animalia
- Phylum: Chordata
- Class: Reptilia
- Order: Squamata
- Suborder: Gekkota
- Family: Gekkonidae
- Genus: Hemiphyllodactylus
- Species: H. zayuensis

Binomial name
- Hemiphyllodactylus zayuensis Jiang, Wang, & Che, 2020

Species of lizard

Hemiphyllodactylus zayuensis is a species of gecko. It is endemic to Tibet and named after its type locality, Zayü. Males measure about 43–44 mm (1.69–1.73 in) and females 43–46 mm (1.69–1.81 in) in snout–vent length.
