= Xiachayu =

Xiazayü 下察隅镇
- Town
- Location in Tibet
- Coordinates: 28°29′16″N 97°01′22″E
- Country: People's Republic of China
- Region: Tibet
- Prefecture: Nyingchi
- County: Zayü
- Village-level divisions: 18 villages

Area
  - Total: 1,215.07 km^{2} (469.14 sq mi)
- Elevation: 1,542 m (5,059 ft)

Population (2005)
  - Total: 5,389
  - Density: 4.435/km^{2} (11.49/sq mi)
- Time zone: UTC+8 (China Standard)

Xiazayü (Chinese: 下察隅; pinyin: Xiàcháyú; lit. 'lower Zayü'; Standard Tibetan: རྫ་ཡུལ་རོང་སྨད།) is a town of Zayü County, in southeastern Tibet Autonomous Region, People's Republic of China (PRC), located in a deep river valley 47 km (29 mi) from the county seat and bordering India's Arunachal Pradesh, which is claimed by the PRC, to the southwest, as well as Burma to the southeast.

As of 2005, Xiachayu Town has a population of 5389 residing in an area of 1,215.07 km^{2} (469.14 sq mi), and as of 2011, it has 18 villages under its administration. The town contains a population of the Mishmi people (or Deng people), which has yet to be officially recognised as one of the PRC's 56 ethnicities. Tourism was developing in the Shaqiong Deng Village (沙瓊僜人村). However, foreigners were not allowed to enter Zayü as of 2011.
