= Meili Snow Mountains =

Mountain range in Yunnan, China

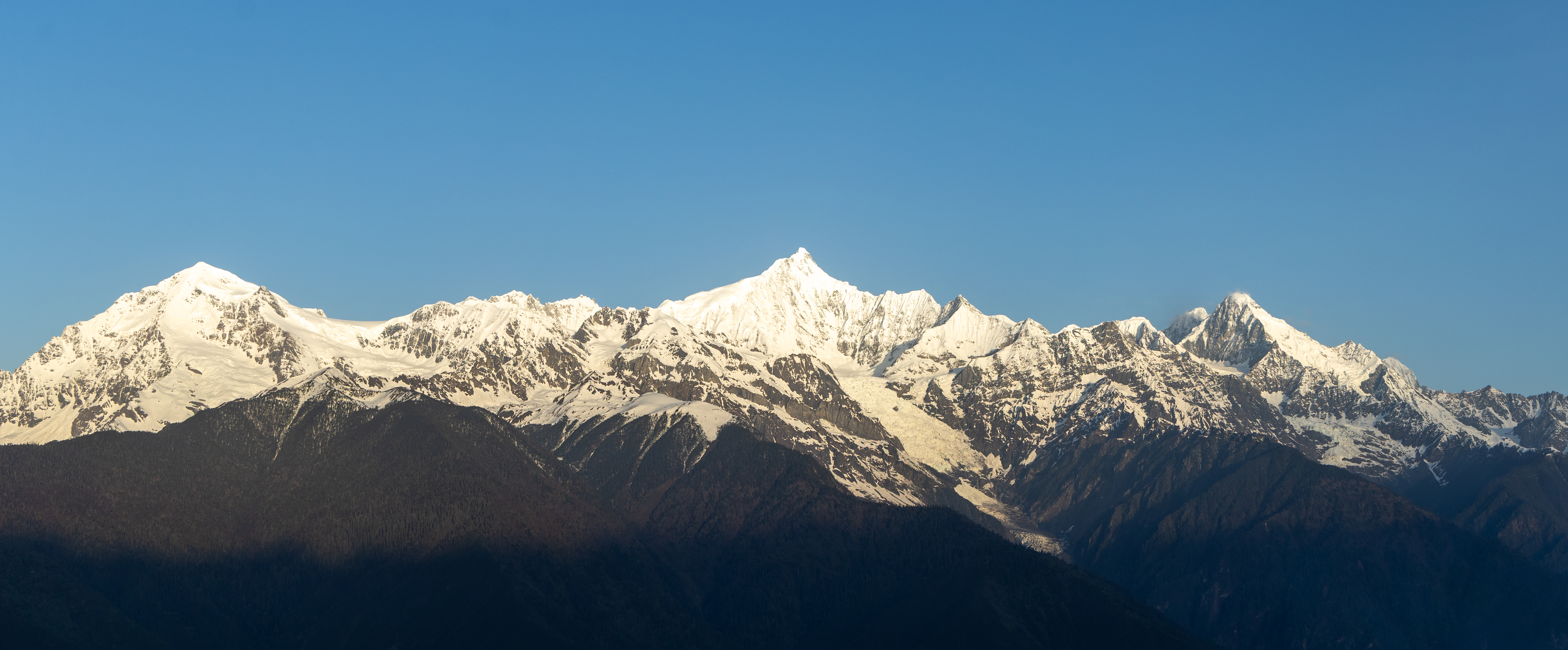

Highest point
- Peak: Kawagebo
- Elevation: 6,740 m (22,110 ft)
- Coordinates: 28°26′14″N 98°41′04″E

Dimensions
- Length: 200 km (120 mi) North-south
- Width: 30 km (19 mi) East-west
- Area: 6,000 km^{2} (2,300 mi^{2})

Naming
- Native name: 梅里雪山 (Chinese); སྨིན་གླིང་གངས་རི (Standard Tibetan)

Geography
- Location within Yunnan
- Country: China
- State: Yunnan
- Rivers: Salween and Mekong
- Settlement: Deqen is the closest settlement of considerable size
- Parent range: Hengduan Mountain

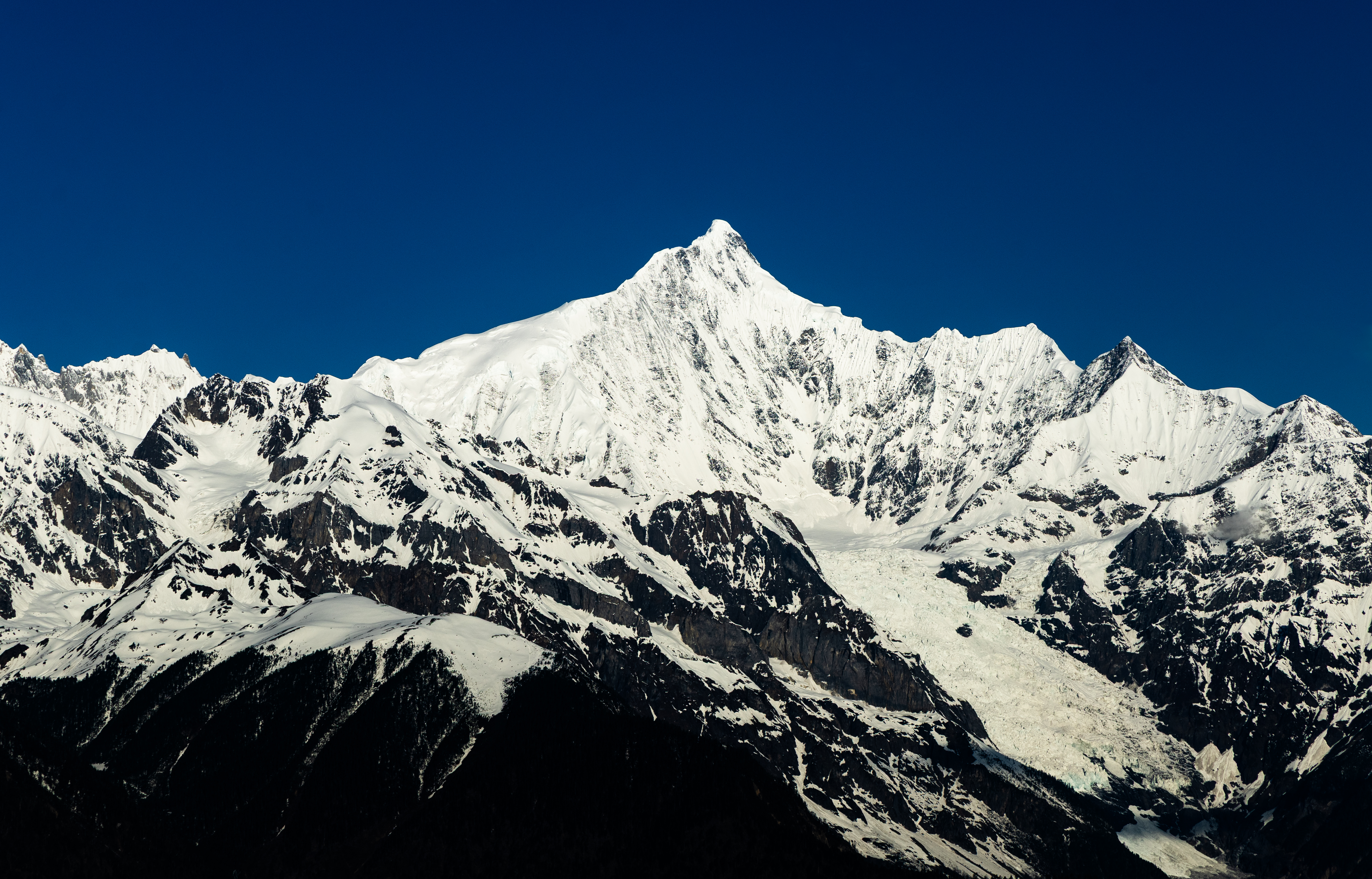
Kawagarbo

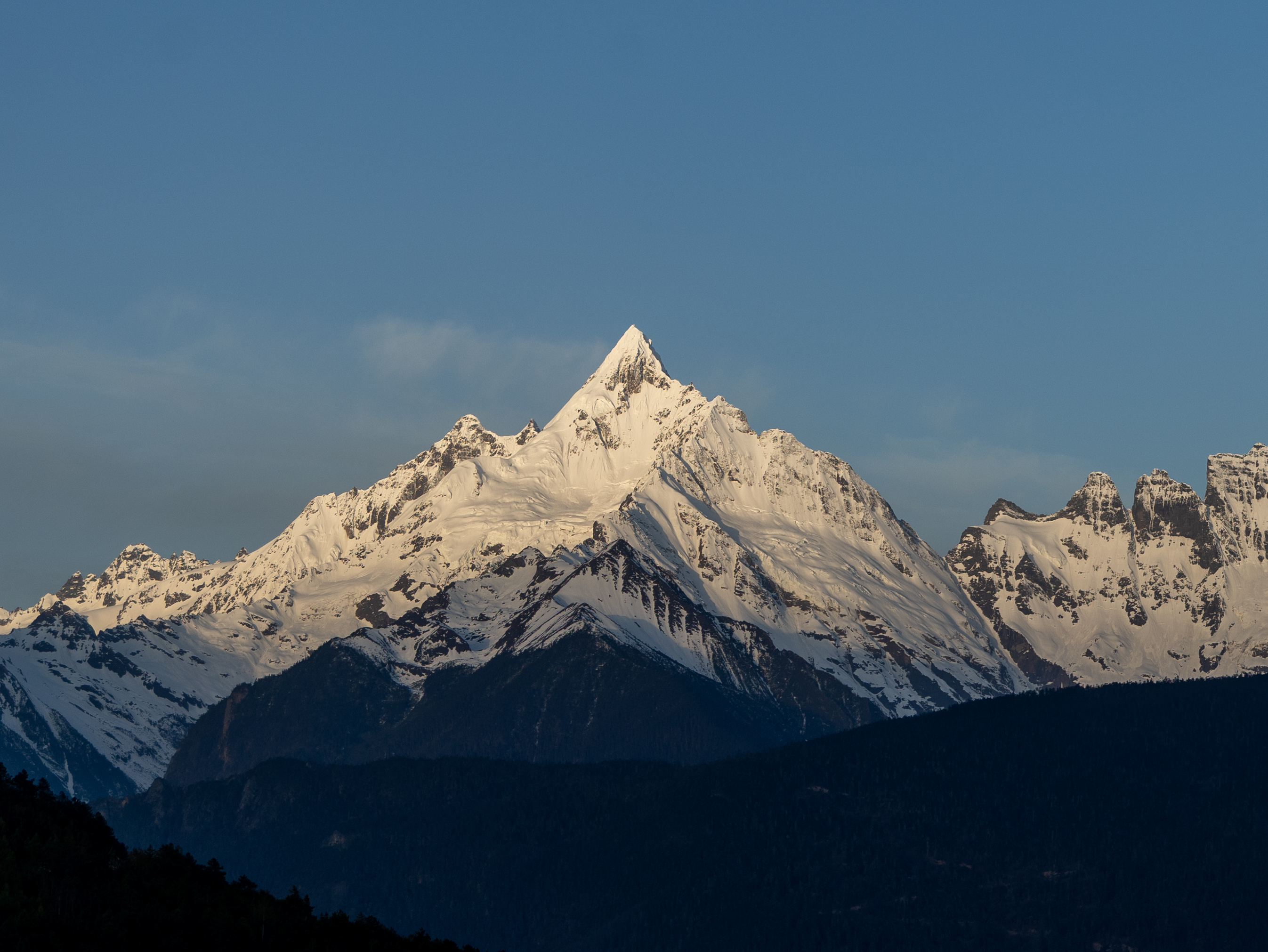
Mianzimu

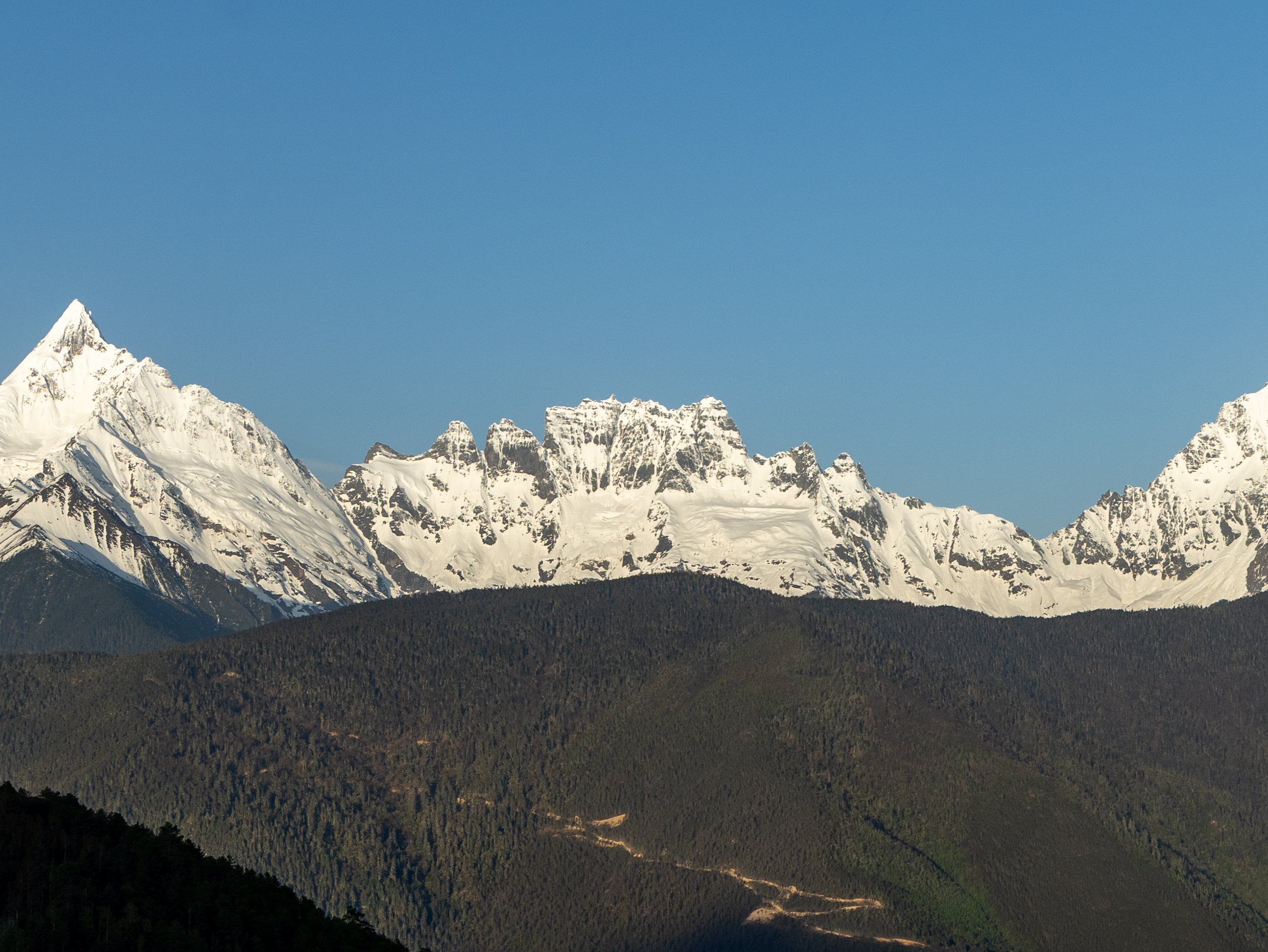
Jiariren-an

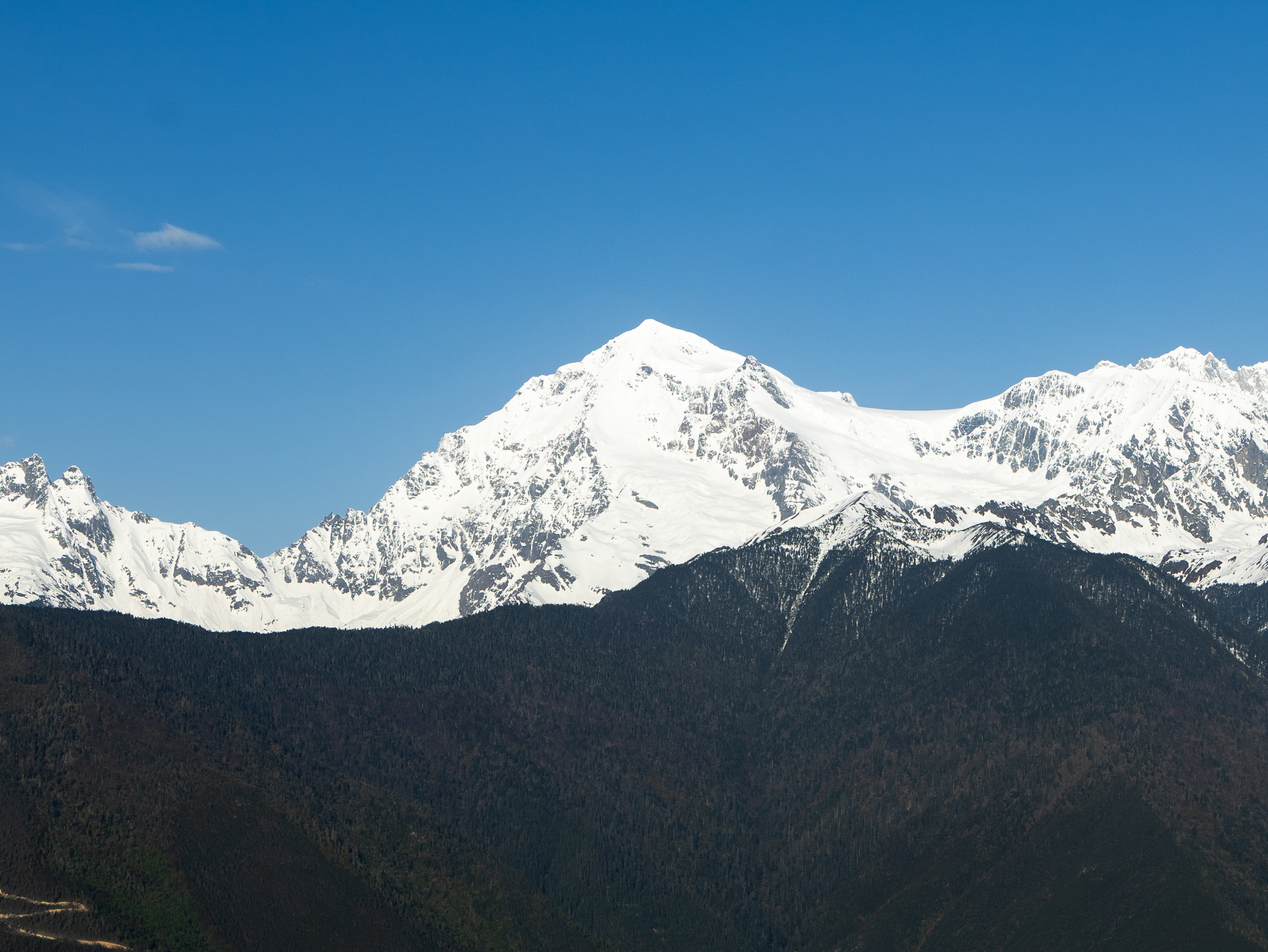
Bawu Bameng

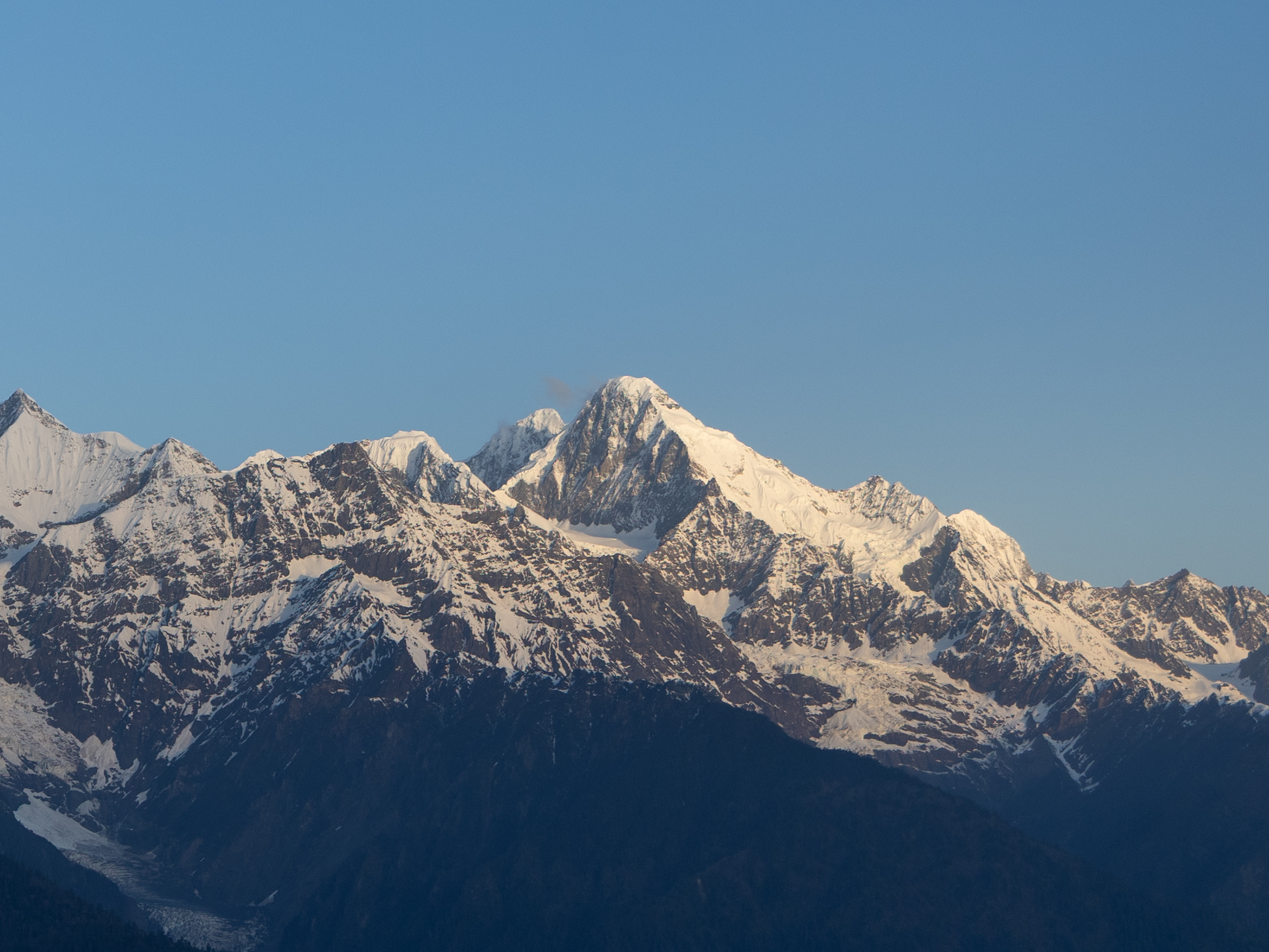
Nairi Dingka

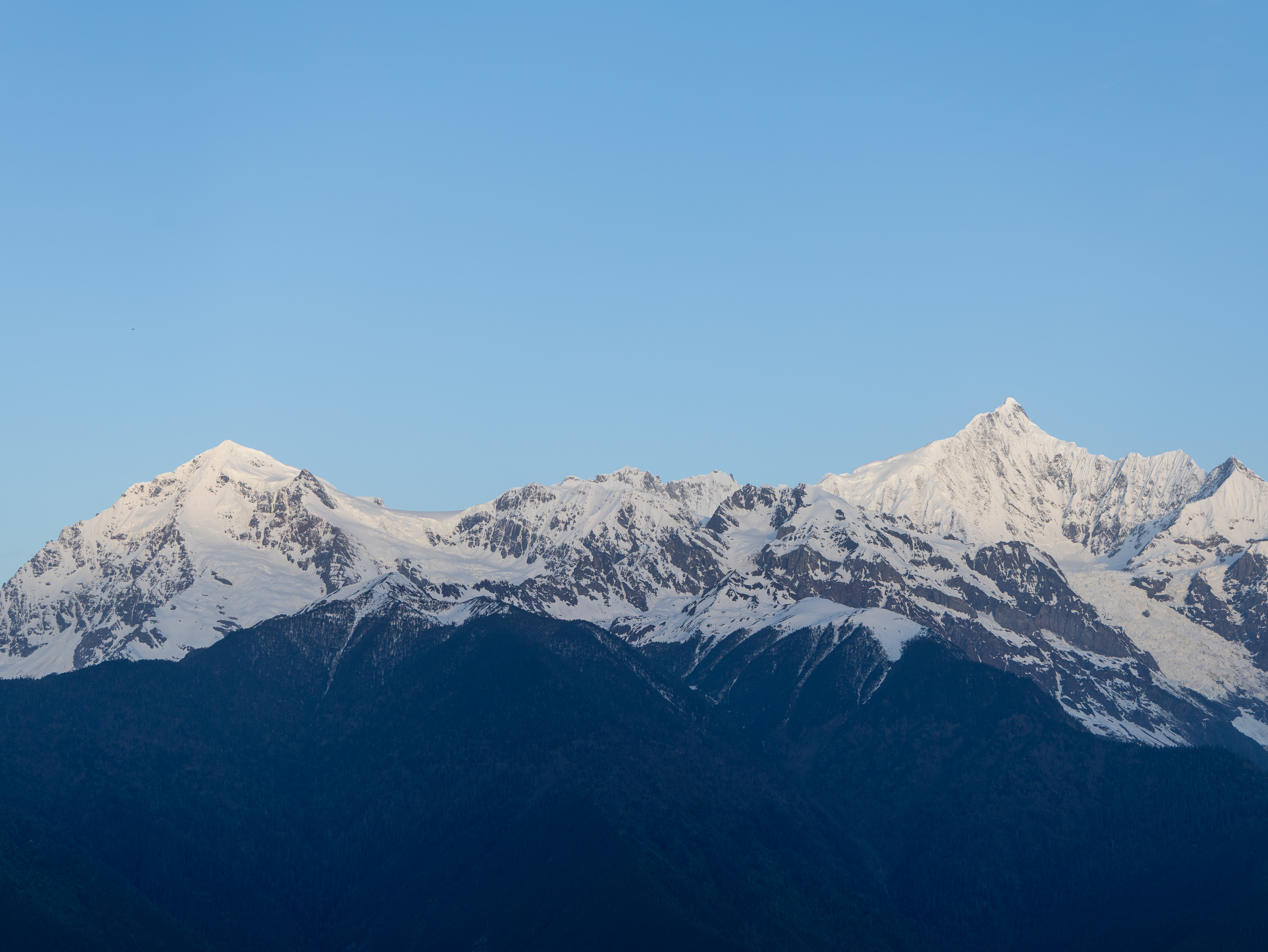
Paba Niding Jiuzhao

Meili Snow Mountains (Chinese: 梅里雪山; pinyin: Méilǐ Xuěshān), Mainri (སྨན་རི།) or Minling Snow Mountains (Tibetan: སྨིན་གླིང་གངས་རི།, Wylie: smin gling gangs ri) is a mountain range in the Chinese province of Yunnan. It lies close to the northwestern boundary of the province and is bounded by the Nujiang river on the west and the Lancang River on the east. The Meili are subrange of the larger Nu Mountains, themselves a constituent range of the Hengduan group.

The crest of the range rises to over 6,000 metres (20,000 ft) above sea level, making for impressive prominence over the river valleys to the east and west, which are between 1,500 metres (4,900 ft) and 1,900 metres (6,200 ft) in elevation. The highest peak is Kawagarbo, which rises to 6,740 metres (22,110 ft). Kawagarbo is considered sacred for Tibetan Buddhists. Other significant peaks include Mianzimu, Cogar Laka and Jiariren-an. Because of restrictions and dangerous conditions, none of the major peaks in the range have ever been summited.

== Name ==
In Tibet, people usually call the mountain by its peak Kawagarbo or Taizi (Prince) Snow Mountain.

In Tibetan, "Meili/Mainri" means mountains of herbs. People named the mountain "Meili/Mainri" because of the valuable herbs on this mountain.

== Main Peaks ==
- Kawagarbo (6,740m)
  - Also called Taizi (Prince) Peak.
- Mianzimu (6,054m)
  - Also called God Daughter (Queen) Peak.
- Jiawa Ren-an (5,470.5m)
  - Five Budda Peak
- Bujiong SongJie Wuxue (approximately 6,000m)
  - Also called Son Peak.
- Lora Zangui Gonbu (5,229m)
  - The main peak of Meili Snow Mountain geographically
- Bawu Bameng (6,000m)
- Paba Niding Jiuzhao (5,880m)
- Mabing Zhala Wangdui (6,365m)
- Nairi Dingka (6,379m)
- Cogar Laka (5,993m)
- Zhala Queni (5,640m)
- Badui (5,157m)
- Zhandui Wuxue (6,400m)
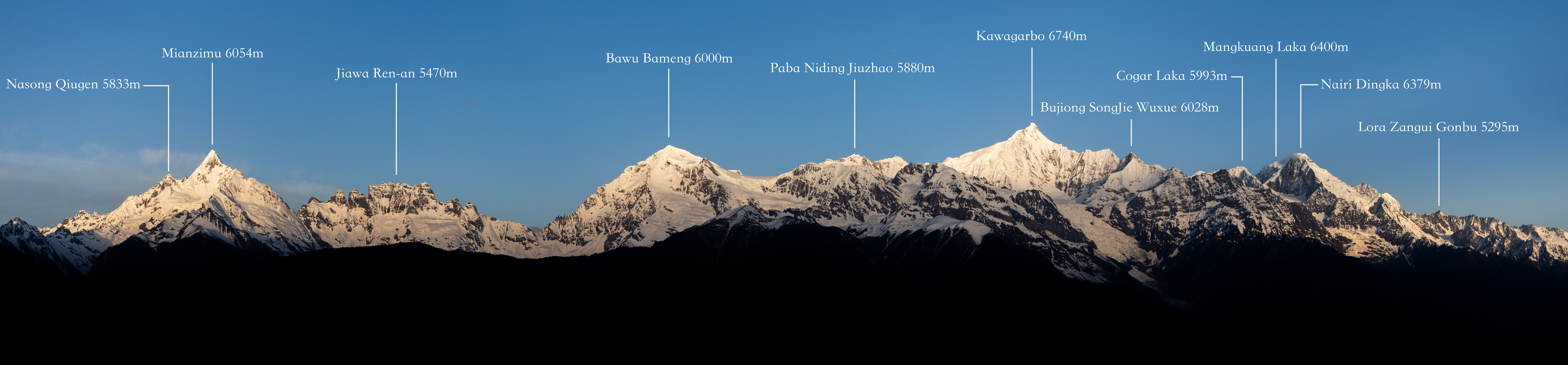

== History ==
=== Expedition Records ===
- 1987: From August to September, the Joetsu Alpine Club abandoned their expedition to Kawagarbo due to continuous avalanches. (Height: 5,100m) Direction: Mingyong Glacier
- 1988: An American Expedition team led by Nicholas Clinch abandoned their expedition. (Height: 4,350m) Direction: Mingyong Glacier
- 1989: Between September and November, a joint expedition team of Chinese climbers and the Academic Alpine Club of Kyoto University (AACK) was created and made their first attempt. (Height: 5,500m) Direction: Yubeng
- 1990: Between November and January 1991, the previous joint expedition team made their second attempt and lost their lives in an avalanche. (Height: 6,470m) Direction: Yubeng
- 1991: In January, the rescue team led by the Chinese Mountaineering Association (CMA) reached C2 camp of the previous joint expedition at 5,300m but abandoned their rescue mission on January 21 due to heavy snow.
- 1991: Between April and June, a joint Chinese and Japanese search team abandoned their mission due to multiple snow storms and avalanches.
- 1996: Between October and December, a new joint expedition team by Chinese and Japanese mountaineers made another summitting attempt, but remained unsuccessful due to extreme weather conditions. (Height: 5,300) Direction: Yubeng

=== Climbing ban ===
Kawagarbo is a sacred mountain in Tibetan culture. The local people believe ascending the mountain is blasphemy and any mountaineering accidents constituted anger of the gods. After considering the local cultural perspectives and for the safety of the expedition, the local government at Deqin has forbidden further climbing activities in the Meili Snow Mountain area.

- 2000, an international meeting was held between the government of Yunnan Province and The Nature Conservancy (TNC). The meeting made an appeal to prohibit any climbing activities on Kawagarbo.
- 2001, a law was passed by the local government that no climbing activities were to be allowed on Kawagarbo going onward.

== Climate ==
=== Temperature ===
The average temperature in Meili Snow Mountain Area has had a trend of increasing each year since 1990.

The temperature of the area is distributed by the mountain range that splits the area into west and east. The temperature on the North-West side increases the most while the east remains mostly the same across the whole year. The increasing trend of temperature in the Meili Snow Mountain range has a strong correlation with the elevation. At an area higher than 4,000m, the temperature's increasing trend gets larger per meter.

=== Precipitation ===
The precipitation has a huge trend of decreasing each year. Most of the precipitation is in summer while winter has the least.

The monsoon period contributes the most to the annual precipitation. Approximately 67% of the precipitation is in the Monsoon period. Among all the observations since 1990, the precipitation in Spring has decreased by 10% in total. The amount of precipitation also has a strong correlation with the elevation. During the monsoon period, the precipitation decreases as the elevation gets lower on the west side of the mountain range. However, the precipitation raises tremendously on the east side of the mountain where the elevation is below 3,700m.

=== Climate Change ===
Due to the increasing trend of temperature and the decreasing trend of precipitation, the Meili Snow Mountain range is facing a huge challenge that its glacier water resource is getting scarcer annually. Protecting the environment and preventing the area from losing its water resource becomes more important each year. The environmental protection in Meili Snow Mountain could be decisive to its biome system.
