= Kawagarbo =

Highest mountain in Yunnan, China

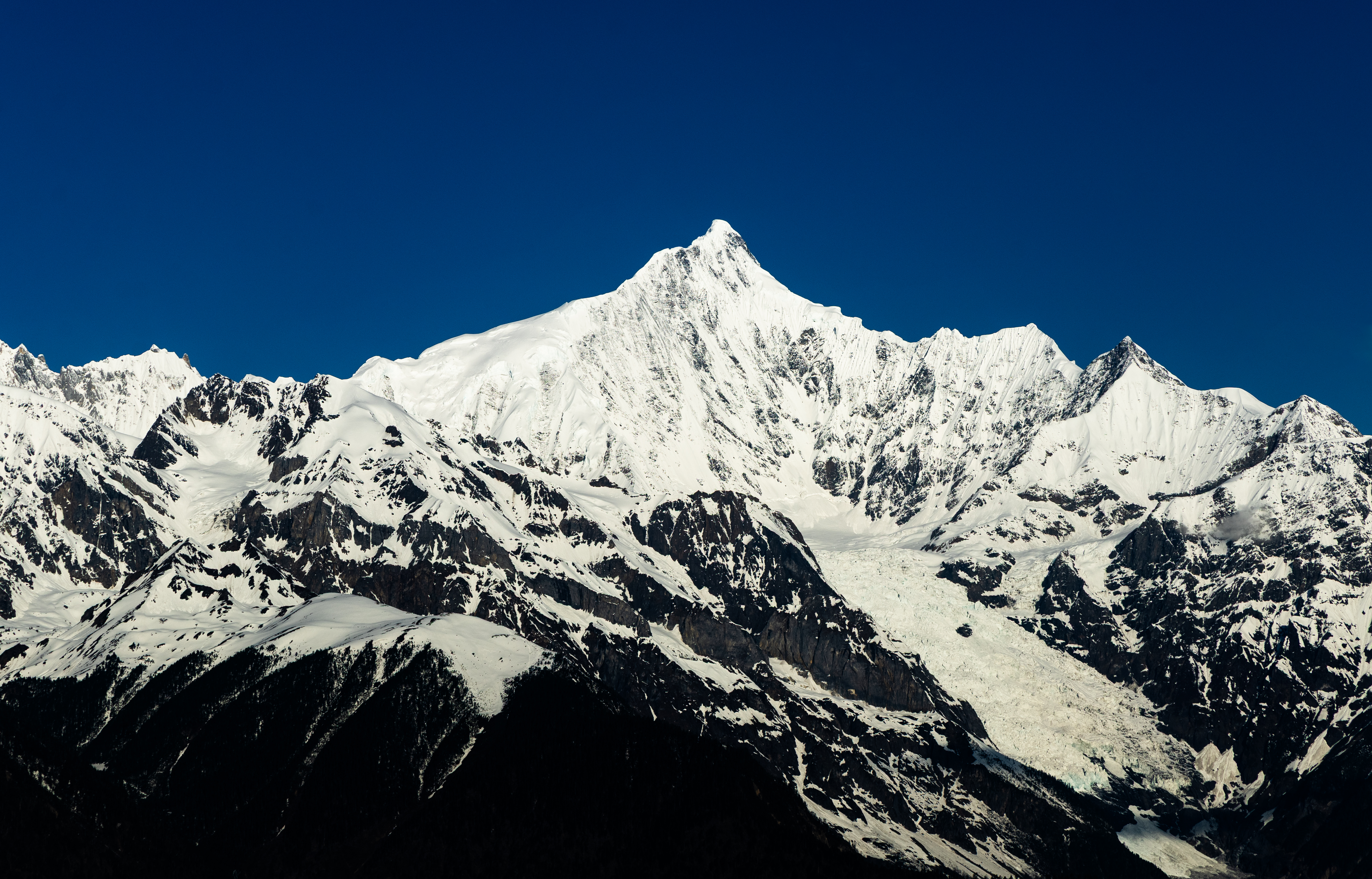
- East Face of Kawagarbo

Highest point
- Elevation: 6,740.1 m (22,113 ft)
- Prominence: 2,232 m (7,323 ft)
- Listing: Ultra
- Coordinates: 28°26′18″N 98°41′00″E

Geography
- Location within Yunnan
- Location: Tibet/Yunnan, China
- Parent range: Meili Xueshan, Hengduan Mountains

Climbing
- First ascent: unclimbed (as of 2003)

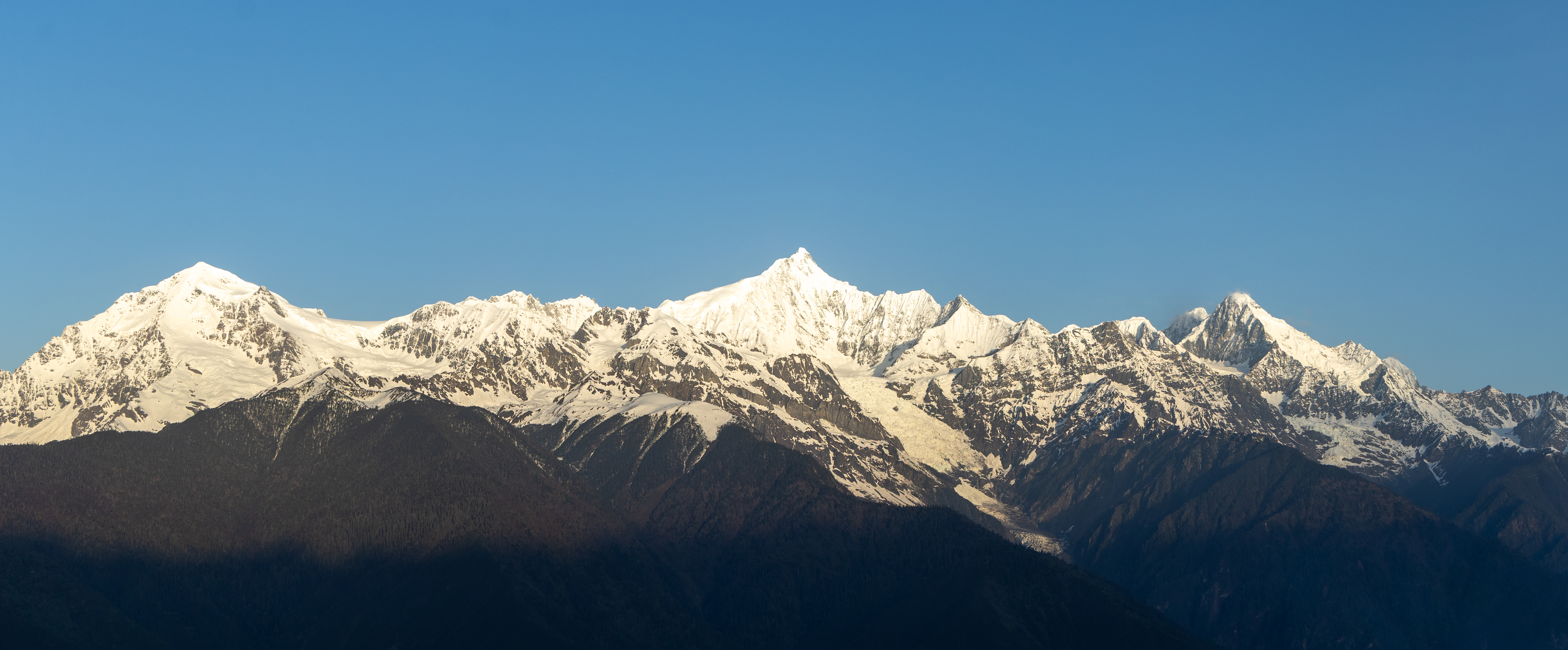
The Meili Xueshan range from Fei Lai Si

Kawa Garbo or Khawa Karpo (Tibetan: ཁ་བ་དཀར་པོ།, ZWPY: Kawagarbo; also transcribed as Kawadgarbo, Khawakarpo, Moirig Kawagarbo, Kawa Karpo or Kha-Kar-Po), as it is known by local residents and pilgrims, or Kawagebo Peak (Chinese: 卡瓦格博), is the highest mountain in the Chinese province of Yunnan. It is located on the border between Dêqên County, Yunnan, and the counties of Zogang and Zayü of the Tibet Autonomous Region. It rises about 20 kilometres (12 mi) west of Shengping (升平镇), the seat of Dêqên County, which lies on China National Highway 214. What is now Dêqên County has been part of Yunnan since the 1720s, when the current border with Tibet was established by the early Qing Dynasty. Kawagarbo is one of the most sacred peaks in the Tibetan world and is often referred to as Nyainqênkawagarbo to show its sacredness and avoid ambiguousness with the other Kawagarbo in the Anung-Derung-speaking Gongshan County.

== Geography ==
Kawa Karpo is the high point in a range of high peaks that are generally referred to by Tibetans also as Kawa Karpo. A mapping error by the Chinese army during the 1950s transcribed the name for a lower range of mountains to the north on a much larger area that also included Kawa Karpo. The name of this lower range in Tibetan is Menri (Wylie system; Sman-ri in the Wade–Giles system; name means Mountains of Medicinal Herbs), but is most widely known by its Chinese transliteration, Meili Xue Shan (梅里雪山 or Meili Snow Mountain). This is the name most widely applied to the range by Chinese and Western sources. The Meili range is a small massif of the much more extensive Hengduan Shan, the major north-south trending complex of mountains lying along the eastern edge of the Tibetan Plateau in eastern Tibet, northwestern Yunnan, western Sichuan, and far northern Myanmar. The Kawa Karpo forms part of the divide between the Salween (Nujiang) and Mekong (Lancangjiang) rivers.

The Kawa Karpo has over 20 peaks with permanent snow cover, including six peaks over 6,000 m (19,700 ft). Topographic extremes are immense, with vertical relief ranging from less than 2,000 m along the Mekong River on the east to 6,740 m on the summit of Kawa Karpo within 10 km horizontal distance. Even greater topographic relief is found on the west or Salween River side of the range. Coincident with this extreme topographic gradient is a similarly steep environmental gradient. Compressed within this short distance are subtropical scrub ecosystems along the arid canyon bottoms, rising through dry oak forests, humid mixed deciduous-coniferous forests, cold temperate coniferous forests, alpine meadows and scree above treeline, to permanent snow on the high peaks. The Mingyong Glacier, descending from the summit of Kawa Karpo, terminates at a low elevation just before the subtropical life zone. The range is highly affected by the monsoon, leading to especially unstable snow conditions, which have affected climbing attempts (see below).

== Sacred mountain worship ==
Kawa Karpo is one of the most sacred mountains for Tibetan Buddhism as the spiritual home of a warrior god of the same name. It is visited by 20,000 pilgrims each year from throughout the Tibetan world; many pilgrims circumambulate the peak, an arduous 240 km (150 mi) trek. Although it is important throughout Tibetan Buddhism, it is the local Tibetans that are the day-to-day guardians and stewards of Kawa Karpo, both the deity and the mountain.

The ancestral religion of the Kawa Karpo area, as in much of Tibet, was Bön, a shamanistic tradition based on the concept of a world pervaded by good and evil spirits. Bön encompassed numerous deities and spirits which are still recognized today, and are often connected with specific geographical localities and natural features; the major mountain peaks in the Hengduan Mountains are thus all identified with specific deities. Kawa Karpo is one of these. Since its introduction, Tibetan Buddhism has been the dominant religion of the Kawa Karpo area, with followers of Gelugpa doctrine being the most common.

Tibetans believe that their warrior god would leave them if a human should ever set foot on the peak of Kawa Karpo, thereby robbing the peak of its sanctity and leading to disasters in the wake of the loss of the god's protection. Tibetans have also established a centuries-old sacred geography around the peak, maintained by religious leaders from local monasteries in negotiation with local villages. This sacred natural site preserves the natural resources and ecological health of the range.

== Climbing history ==
The first attempt on Kawa Karpo was made in 1987 by a party from the Joetsu Alpine Club of Japan.

In the winter of 1990–91 a Japanese group from the Academic Alpine Club of Kyoto University attempted the peak in conjunction with a Chinese group. Their activity caused heavy protests from the local Tibetan community due to the mountain's cultural and religious significance. On 3 January 1991, a nighttime avalanche killed all seventeen members of the expedition in one of the deadliest mountaineering accidents in history. The same Japanese club from Kyoto returned in 1996 and made another unsuccessful attempt.

Bodies of 10 victims of the 1991 expedition were subsequently recovered and a further six turned up over the following years, leaving only the remains of Hisanobu Shimizu – the group’s doctor – missing.

American expeditions, led by Nicholas Clinch, visited the range in 1988, 1989, 1992, and 1993, attempting other major peaks, but were unsuccessful.

In 2001, the local Chinese government passed laws banning all future climbing attempts on cultural and religious grounds. As of 2010, none of the significant peaks of the range have been successfully climbed.

== Retreat of Mingyong Glacier ==
Mingyong Glacier descends steeply from the east face of Kawagarbo into the Mekong River valley on the Yunnan side of the massif. Because it descends from near the summit of Kawagarbo, it is also considered sacred by Tibetan Buddhists and two temples are located along its lower edge. From those temples, the rapid retreat of Mingyong Glacier is obvious, especially to local people who observe it year in and year out. A monk from Taizi Temple reflected on this rapid retreat of Mingyong Glacier, concerned that it might be punishment from Kawagarpo for the lack of devotion by him and his fellow Buddhists.

The retreat of Mingyong Glacier, linked to a warming climate in the Deqin area, has received considerable attention for its implications for biodiversity conservation, retrieval of climbers' bodies killed in the 1991 avalanche, impacts on Mingyong village water supply, and in the broader context of climate change impacts to biological and social systems in northwest Yunnan and beyond.

== See also ==
- Three Parallel Rivers of Yunnan Protected Areas, a UNESCO World Heritage Site, includes Kawagarbo/Meili, as well as a number of other iconic mountain landscapes in northwestern Yunnan.
- List of ultras of Tibet, East Asia and neighbouring areas
