= Mingyong Glacier =

Glacier in Yunnan, China

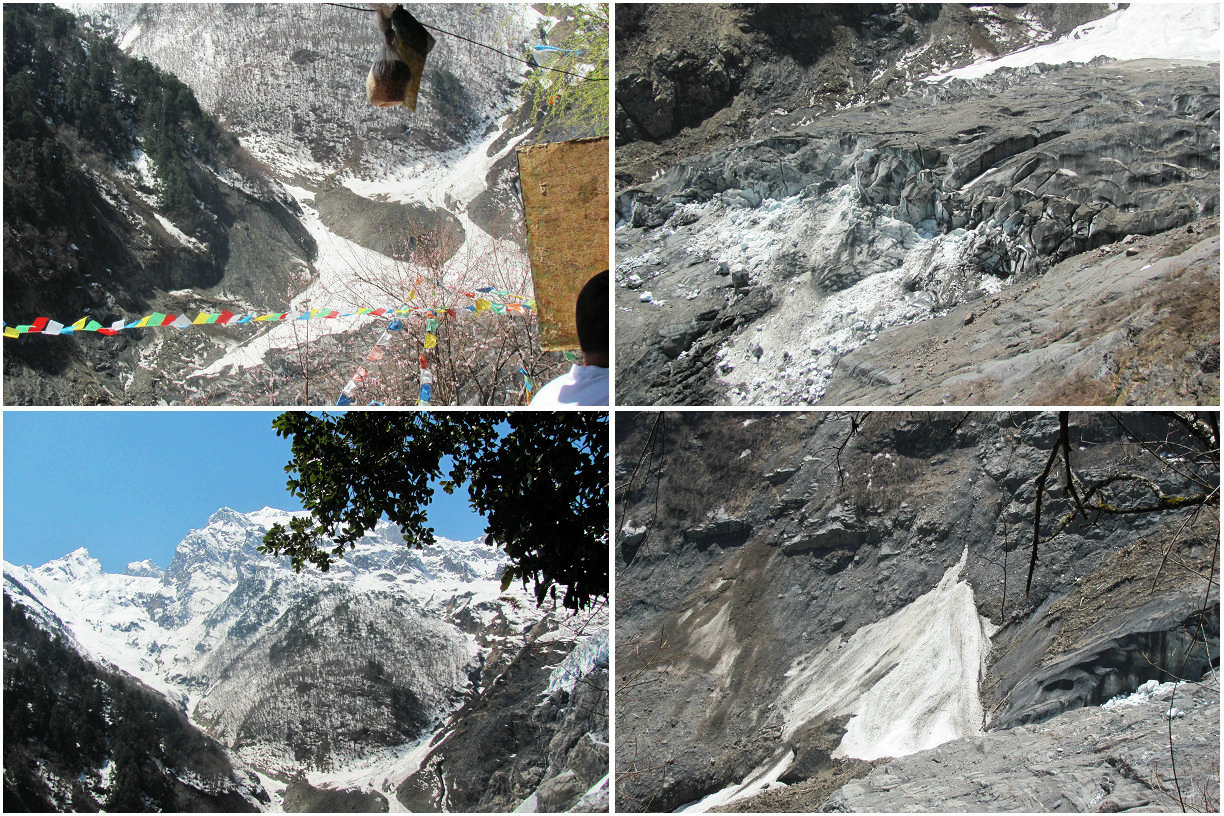

- Location within Yunnan
- Interactive map of Mingyong Glacier
- Type: Mountain glacier
- Location: Yunnan Province, China
- Coordinates: 28°27′13″N 98°44′23″E
- Area: 13 km^{2} (5.0 sq mi)
- Length: 11.7 km (7.3 mi)
- Status: Retreating

Mingyong Glacier is located in the Yunnan Province, People's Republic of China, The glacier retreated 200 meters (656 feet) in four years. The region has also seen a rising tree line and these events are believed to be associated with global warming. The glacier is sacred to the local Tibetan peoples. The glacier is fed by snows which fall on 6,740 m (22,107 ft) Mount Meili, also known as the Meili Snow Mountain. Glaciers in China's Tibetan region are melting at 7 percent annually. At 28.5 degrees north and an elevation of 2,700 meters (8,858 ft), the glacier is located at the lowest latitude and elevation of any glacier in China.

== See also ==
- List of glaciers
