= Lohit River =

River in Arunachal Pradesh in India

Lohit River Zayul Chu
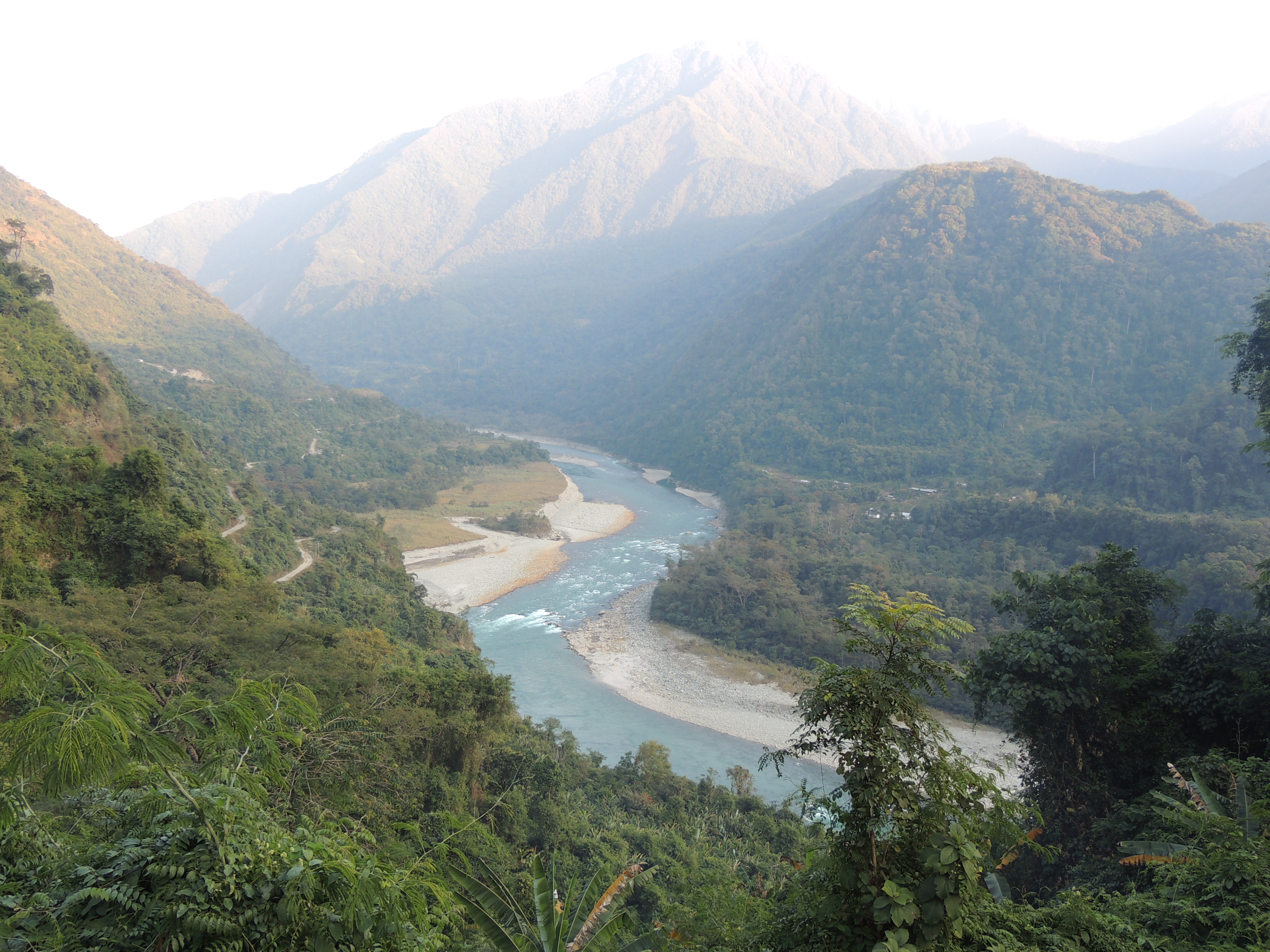
- Lohit River in Arunachal Pradesh

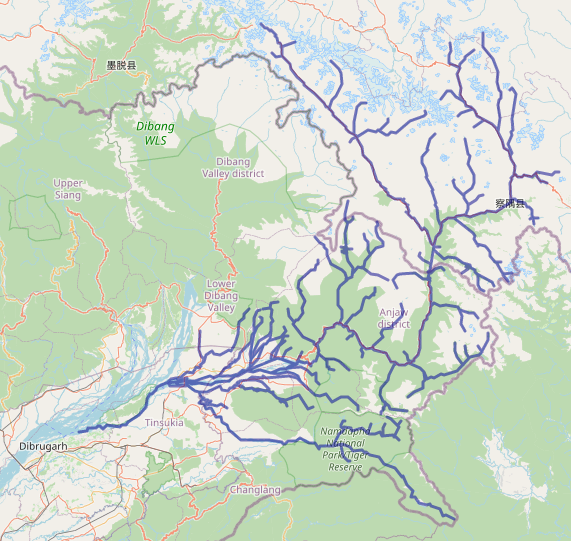
- Lohit River basin

- Mouth of Lohit River Lohit River (India) Lohit River (Asia)

Location
- Country: China, India
- Province: Tibet, Arunachal Pradesh, Assam

Physical characteristics
- Source: Kangri Karpo
  - location: Tibet, Zayu County, China
  - coordinates: 29.1629°N 97.0837°E
  - elevation: 5,200 m (17,100 ft)
- 2nd source: Kangri Karpo
  - location: Tibet, Zayu County, China
  - coordinates: 29.463°N 97.1366°E
- Mouth: Siang (Brahmaputra)
  - location: Assam
  - coordinates: 27°48′N 95°28′E
  - elevation: 108 m (354 ft)
- Length: 560 km (350 mi)
- Basin size: 41,499 km^{2} (16,023 mi^{2})
- Discharge
  - location: Confluence of Brahmaputra River, Assam, India
  - average: 3,437.9 m^{3}/s (121,410 cu ft/s)
- Discharge
  - location: Demwe Lower hydroelectric plant (basin size: 20,174 km^{2} (7,789 sq mi)), Arunachal Pradesh, India
  - average: (Period: 1984/85-2003/04)1,234 m^{3}/s (43,600 cu ft/s)
  - minimum: 263 m^{3}/s (9,300 cu ft/s)
  - maximum: 4,273 m^{3}/s (150,900 cu ft/s)

Basin features
- River system: Brahmaputra River
- Tributaries
  - left: Zuao, Gholum, Lati, Noa Dihang
  - right: Dav, Delai, Tiding, Dibang

The Lohit River, also known as the Zayul Chu by the Tibetans, is a river in Tibet and India, which joins the Brahmaputra River in the state of Assam. It is formed in the Zayul County of the Tibet Autonomous Region, through a merger of two rivers: the Kangri Karpo Chu (also called Rongto Chu and Zayul Ngu Chu), which originates in the Kangri Karpo range, and Zayul Chu (Chinese: 察隅河; pinyin: Cháyú Hé), which originates to its northeast. The two rivers merge below the town of Rima. The combined river descends through this mountainous region and surges through Arunachal Pradesh in India for 200 kilometres (120 mi) before entering the plains of Assam where it is known as the Lohit River. Tempestuous and turbulent, and known as the river of blood partly attributable to the lateritic soil, it flows through the Mishmi Hills, to meet the Siang (Brahmaputra) at the head of the Brahmaputra valley. The Lohit-Brahmaputra system is called Dilao by the Dimasas, Tilao by the Ahoms and Tellu by the Mishmis.

== Course ==
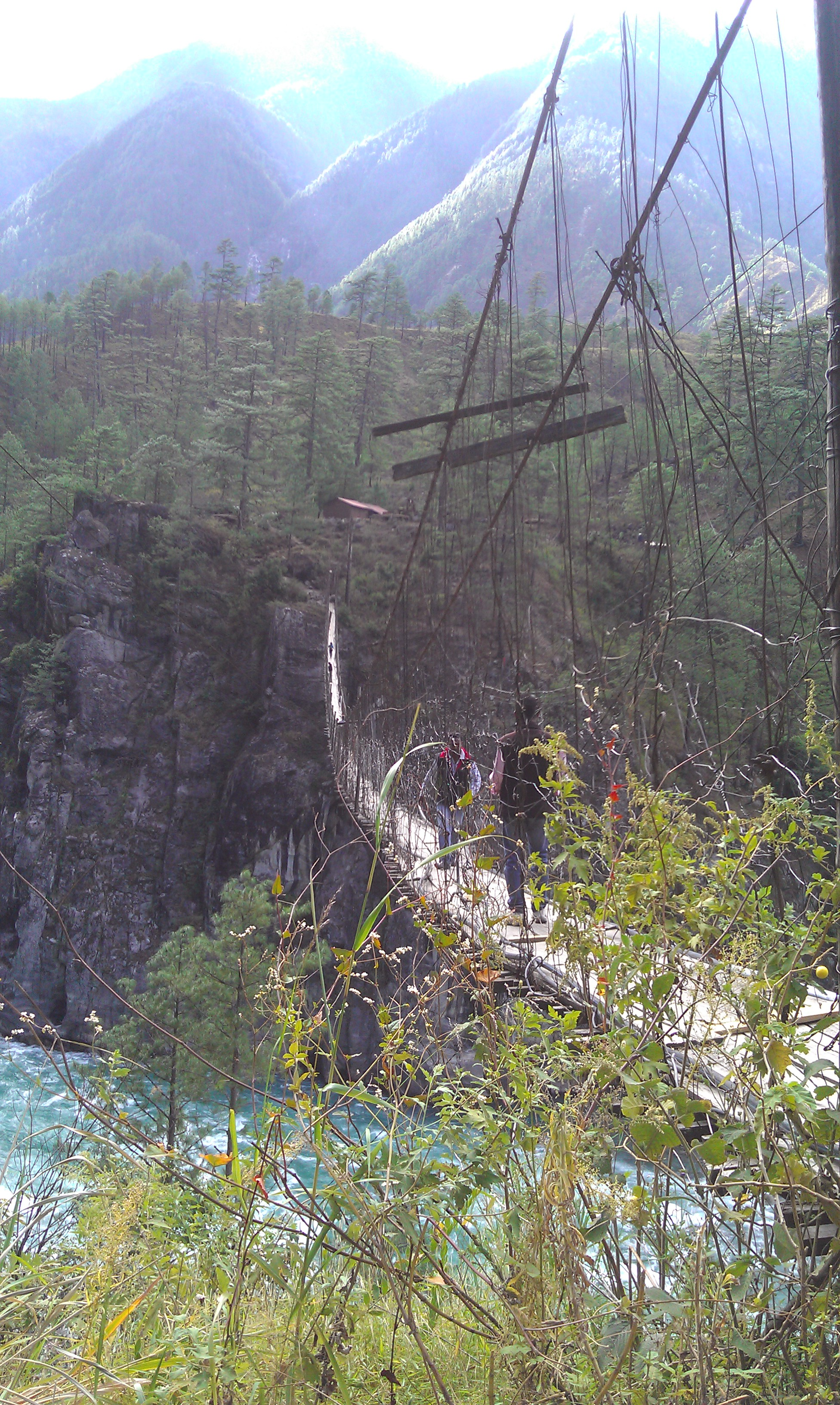
Lohit river at Kahoo, soon after entering Arunachal Pradesh

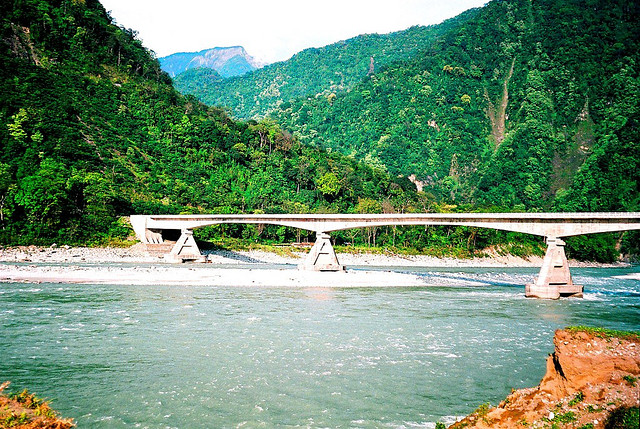
The Lohit River entering the Brahmaputra Valley plains at Parshuram Kund

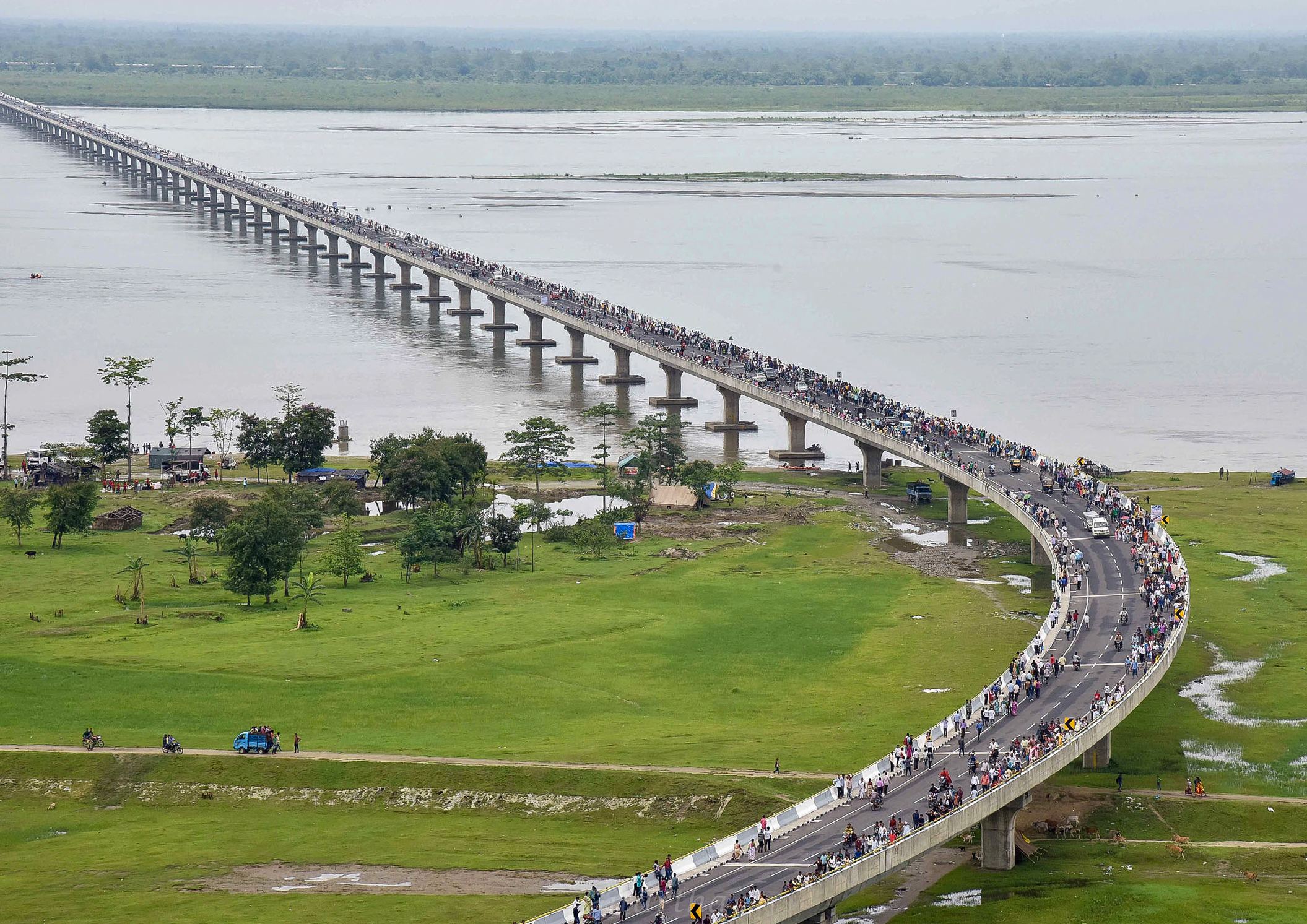
Lohit river at the Dhola–Sadiya Bridge in the Brahmaputra Valley

Thickly forested for the most part, alpine vegetation along the Lohit's course gives way to subtropical forests, and then to tropical jungles. Rhododendrons bloom in many hues in the upper reaches, and orchids are found in the lower groves. The area contains medicinal plants and herbs, including Mishmi teeta, the coptis plant, known for its medicinal properties.

The Mishmis hold sway in the hills. In the plains are the Khamptis and the Singphos, fervent Buddhists and migrants from across the Patkai hills from Burma. As the Lohit journeys through, Tibetan theology gives way to animist belief, in turn replaced by Theravada Buddhism and then by Hindu temples. This region experiences a mix of many cultures near the tripoint between Tibet, Southeast Asia, and South Asia.

The Lohit river comes into India from China and flows near India's easternmost inhabited tip, at a place called Kibithu. The Indian Army uses this river for various expeditions and training.

The Dhola–Sadiya Bridge, also referred to as the Bhupen Hazarika Setu, is a beam bridge and longest in India, connecting the northeast states of Assam and Arunachal Pradesh. The bridge spans the Lohit River, from the village of Dhola in the south to Sadiya to the north.

== River rafting ==
There have been very few raft expeditions on the Lohit River. It is a medium volume continuous Class 4+/5 river in its upper alpine reaches and becomes pool drop towards the latter end of the trip. Rafting was first started in February 1994 by the Indian Army and the first successful kayak descent of the river in December 2003.

Parshuram Kund, a Hindu pilgrimage is situated on the lower reaches of Lohit. Over 70,000 devotees and sadhus take holy dip its water each year on the occasion of Makar Sankranti, in the month of January.

== See also ==
- Zayü County (in Tibet)
- Dhola–Sadiya Bridge
