= Dhola Post =

Dhola post Che Dong
- Border post
- Location within Arunachal Pradesh Location within Tibet
- Coordinates: 27°49′05″N 91°40′25″E
- Country: India (also claimed by China)
- State: Arunachal Pradesh (Tibet AR)
- Established: June 1962

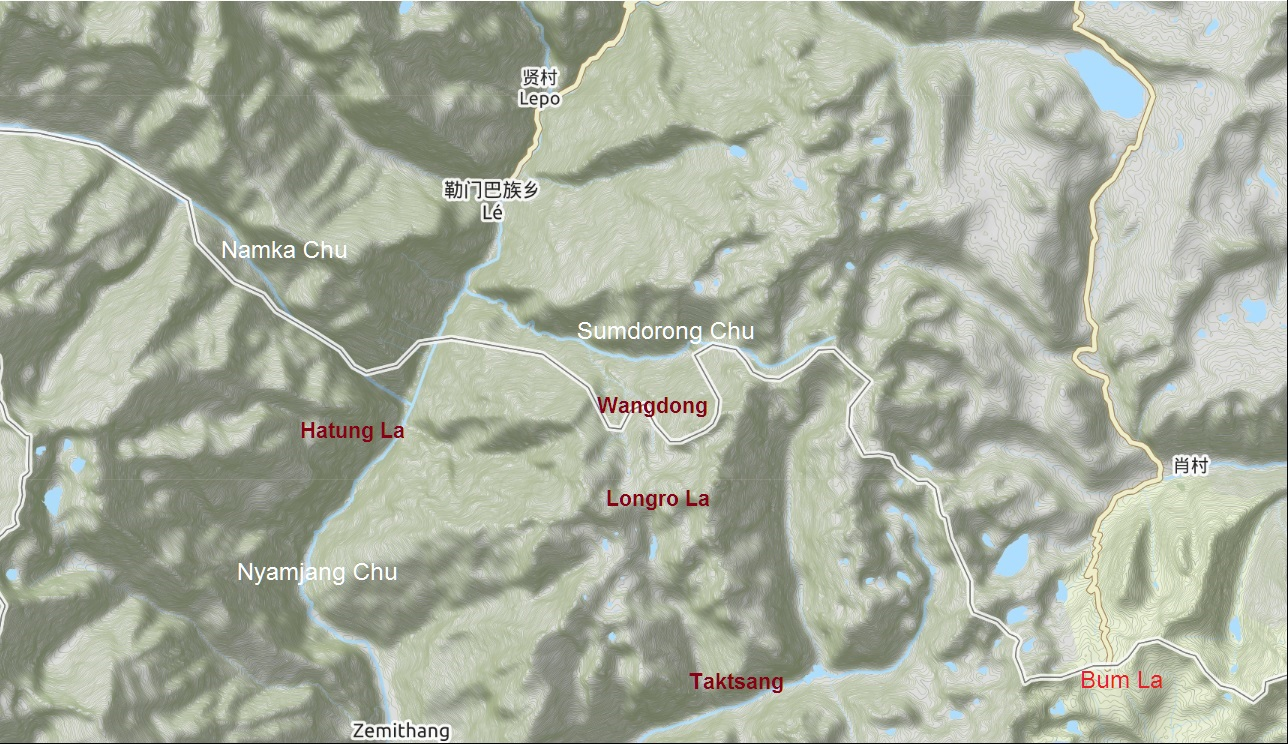
Namka Chu, Sumdorong Chu and vicinity.

Dhola Post was a border post set up by the Indian Army in June 1962 at a location called Che Dong (Chinese: 扯冬; pinyin: Chě dōng) in the Namka Chu river valley disputed by China and India. The area is now generally accepted to be north of the McMahon Line as drawn on the treaty map of 1914, though it is to the south of the Thagla Ridge, where India held the McMahon Line to lie. In June 1962, Indian forces established an outpost called the Dhola Post on the northern slopes of Tsangdhar Range, in the right-side of Namka Chu valley, facing the southern slopes of Thagla Ridge.

On 20 September 1962, amidst various border tensions, the post was attacked by Chinese forces from the Thagla Ridge, sporadic fighting continued until 20 October when an all-out attack was launched by China leading to the Sino-Indian War. Facing an overwhelming force, the Indian Army evacuated the Dhola Post as well as the entire area of Tawang, retreating to Sela and Bomdila. Chinese troops pushed Indian forces back in both theatres, capturing all of their claimed territory in the western theatre and the Tawang Tract in the eastern theatre. The conflict ended when China unilaterally declared a ceasefire on 20 November 1962, which can be attributed to the end of the Cuban Missile Crisis and fears of U.S. intervention to support India, and simultaneously announced its withdrawal to its pre-war position, the effective China–India border (also known as the Line of Actual Control).

After the war, the post was left unoccupied until the 1986 Sumdorong Chu standoff, after which the area was again strengthened by the Indian Army. India now has high altitude Dhaula and Bhawani posts on the ridge west of Nam Ka Chu, supported by Hathunga base camp as well as the high altitude Nelya and Pompagarh posts set further south inside the Indian territory. On the eastern side of Namka Chu, India has high altitude posts at Vasu Rock, Lungrola (Lungro La), Bantu Top, Bum La, Chumi Gyatse Falls, etc.

== Location ==
Dhola Post and environs (Note: The border between Bhutan and India shown in the map was agreed much later, during 1973–1984. It was not in effect in 1962. The border between India and Tibet is OpenStreetMap's representation of "on-the-ground" situation at the current time.) (Note: The location of the Khinzemane post is 1.5 miles northeast of the mouth of Namka Chu.)

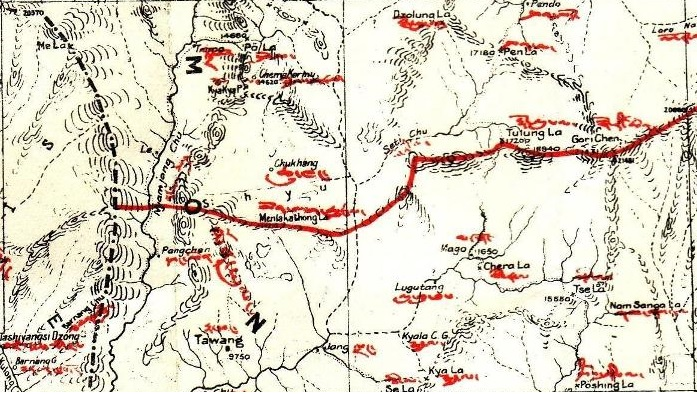
The McMahon Line in the Tawang sector.

The Dhola Post was set up by the Indian border forces on the lower slopes of Tsangdhar range on its northern side. It faced the Thagla Ridge in the north. Between two ridges, and north of the outpost, flows the Namka Chu river from west to east.

Though it was not recognised at the outset, the Tsangdhar ridge, Namka Chu valley as well as the Thagla ridge, all turned out to be part of disputed territory. The territory is to the west of the Nyamjang Chu river, which is intersected by the Indo-Tibetan border. The corresponding area to the east, that of the Sumdorong Chu valley, also turned out to be disputed, though the conflict surrounding it arose much later.

== Background ==
The map attached to the 1914 McMahon Line agreement between Tibet and British India (part of the 1914 Simla Convention) showed a straight line border running east–west in the vicinity of the Nyamjang Chu river, cutting across a ridge now recognised as Tsangdhar. Immediately to the north of Tsangdhar ridge is a higher Thagla Ridge (or Tang La Ridge). The Namka Chu river, 16 miles (26 km) long, flows in the valley between the two ridges, west to east, joining Nyamjang Chu at the bottom.

At the foot of the Thagla Ridge in the Nyamjang Chu valley, about 2.5 km north from the mouth of Namkha Chu, is a grazing ground called Khinzemane (Chinese: 兼则马尼; pinyin: Jiān zé mǎ ní). At the northeastern tip of the Thagla ridge is located the Tibetan village of Le (also spelt Lei or Lai). The villagers of Le as well as those of the village Lumpo to the south are said to have traditionally used the Khinzemane grazing ground. The Indian government claimed that the grazing ground belonged to Lumpo and the villagers of Le had to pay rent to Lumpo for its use.

The Indians held that the boundary was supposed to follow the Himalayan watershed, which was clearly on the Thagla Ridge. They believed that the 1914 map incorrectly depicted the border due to inadequate exploration at that time and that the correct border was on the Thagla Ridge. In 1959, India had placed a post at Khinzemane at the foot of the Thagla Ridge. (Near here, the 14th Dalai Lama escaped from China and crossed into India in March of that year.) The Chinese forces attacked it and forced it to retreat. After some exchanges in the diplomatic channels, (Note: Examples: Government of India: 11 August 1959: "On 7 August armed Chinese patrol strength approximately 200 committed violation of our border at Khinzemane longitude 91.46'E, latitude 27.46’N [spherical coordinates]. When encountered by our own patrol who requested the Chinese Patrol to withdraw to their territory, our patrol was pushed back to the bridge at Drokung Samba longitude 91.47'E, latitude 27.46'N. These places are admittedly within Indian territory and we have been in continuous possession of it. Traditionally as well as according to Treaty Map the boundary runs along Thagla Ridge north of Mankha Chuthangmu valley [Namkha Chu valley] and this position has been accepted in the past."; Government of China: 1 September 1949: "But starting from 9 August, Indian armed personnel again unlawfully intruded many times into Shatze and Khinzemane, both within Chinese territory... These Indian armed personnel however did not heed the solemn warnings of the Chinese frontier guards; they not only failed to withdraw from Chinese territory promptly, but even camped there and deployed forces to control the surrounding important positions to prevent the Chinese frontier guards from entering, in an attempt to seize by force the above-said Chinese territory."; Government of India, 10 September 1959: "The circumstances in which the McMahon Line was fixed as the boundary are given in detail in para 4 of the Prime Minister's letter of 22 March 1959 to Premier Chou En-lai. This line is by and large in accordance with the geographical features in that area and also with long-established usage. The McMahon Line however departs from well-recognised geographical features at a few places. For example,... In regard to the specific dispute raised by the Chinese Government about Khinzemane, the Government of India would like to point out that the boundary line in the particular area follows the crest of the highest mountain range. Khinzemane is south of this range and is obviously part of Indian territory.... However the Government of India are prepared to discuss with the Chinese Government the exact alignment of the so-called McMahon Line at Khinzemane, the Longju area and the Tamaden area.") India reinstated the post. During the officials' level border negotiations between the India and China in 1960, the issue was thoroughly discussed, even though it did not result in any agreement. China continued to maintain that Khinzemane was Chinese territory.

== Establishment ==
In late 1961, India settled on what came to be called a 'forward policy' to circumvent the Chinese expansion into the disputed areas. It ordered the Indian Army to "go as far as practicable ... and be in effective occupation of the whole frontier". In the northeast frontier, Assam Rifles was tasked with setting up posts all along the McMahon Line. The Dhola Post came into being as part of this effort.

The Dhola Post was located on the northern slopes of the Tsangdhar ridge, close to the Namkha Chu valley, at about 300 metres above the level of the river. The Indian official history of the war states that the post was able to dominate the Namkha Chu valley, but it was itself dominated by the Thagla Ridge to the north. The terrain was extremely difficult: thickly wooded mountain slopes led to the area via walking tracks in narrow gorges. The closest inhabitable place was the village of Lumpo at a distance of 24 kilometres (15 mi). The posts had to be supplied by air and the nearest air drop location was on top of the Tsangdhar ridge.

A walking track was established along the mountain slope facing the Namjyang Chu valley, leading from Lumpo to a depression called Hatung La on the Tangdhar ridge. At an intermediate location called Zirkhim (or Serkhim) a helipad was constructed. The villages of Lumpo and Zemithang also had helipads, the latter able to take MI-4 Russian helicopters.

The army officer who commanded the Assam Rifles platoon, Captain Mahabir Prasad, questioned the siting of the post immediately after returning to base. He informed the Divisional Headquarters that, according to the local Intelligence Bureau sources, the Chinese knew about the Dhola Post and regarded the location as Chinese territory. They would be ready to occupy it as soon as they received orders. The Divisional Commander, Maj. Gen. Niranjan Prasad, queried the higher officers whether the territory was properly Indian, but did not receive a response. His superior, Lt. Gen. Umrao Singh commanding the XXXIII Corps, expressed his own doubts about the legality of the territory, which were also greeted with no response. Eventually the matter was referred to Sarvepalli Gopal heading the Historical Division of the Ministry of External Affairs, who answered in the affirmative, citing the Officials' Report. But, before the information trickled down to the commanders, matters came to a head.

== Indian hesitations ==
When General Prasad, the divisional commander, did not receive a reply to his query about the boundary, he assessed that it made tactical sense to occupy the Thagla Ridge preemptively. He sought permission from the Army headquarters to do so. Before the headquarters made up its mind, the Chinese occupied the Thagla Ridge on 8 September 1962. Scholars find the inefficiencies of the Army command responsible for the Indian inaction, but at the same time the lack of clarity on where the border lay and indecision on how far to go in confronting the Chinese seem to have played a role. In contrast, the Chinese moved decisively.

Having occupied the Thagla Ridge, the Chinese entered the Namka Chu valley on the southwestern side of the ridge and threatened the Dhola Post. The Indian Army high command saw the Chinese action as an attempt to replicate in Assam Himalaya the kind of encroachments they were already conducting in Aksai Chin. It was felt that a show of determination was called for to forestall any further encroachments; a 'no alternative' situation, in the words of scholar Steven Hoffmann. Indeed, the opposition parties were vying for blood. The Swatantra Party led by Rajagopalachari asked for Nehru's resignation. In a meeting chaired by defence minister Krishna Menon, it was decided that India would use force "to expel the Chinese from the south of the Thagla [Ridge]".

The Army headquarters ordered 7th Infantry Brigade to move to Dhola to deal with the Chinese investment of the post. The local commanders thought the operation to be utterly infeasible. Umrao Singh argued that the Chinese could easily outstrip any effort by India to induct new troops into the area since they had a roadhead leading to their positions. He recommended withdrawing the Dhola Post to the south of the map-marked McMahon Line. He was overruled by General L. P. Sen, in charge of the Eastern Command. In Sen's view any intrusion into Indian territory was unacceptable to the Indian government and the intrusion must be thrown out by force.

Fighting broke out on 20 September and continued for ten days. L. P. Sen asked for plans for dislodging the Chinese from the Thagla Ridge. The corps commander, who thought it infeasible, produced logistical requirements that were impossible to meet. Sen asked the high command for Umrao Singh to be replaced. The high command divested Umrao Singh's XXXIII Corps of responsibility for Assam Himalaya, and gave it to IV Corps. The Chief of General Staff B. M. Kaul was asked to head the new formation. IV Corps' troops in the area were inadequate and Kaul is said to have lacked combat experience.

== Skirmishes ==
Kaul toured Dhola Post and nearby locations on 6, 7 and 8 October. Despite the obvious difficulties he perceived, Kaul remained determined to execute the plan of evicting the Chinese from the Thagla Ridge. His orders were to complete the operation by 10 October. During the few days he had been there, Kaul understood that Thagla was tactically out of reach. So on 9 October, he sent soldiers of 9 Punjab to Thagla Ridge to establish themselves anywhere on it towards Yumtso La. The soldiers came face to face with the Chinese and a brief skirmish took place at Tseng Jong.

=== Clash at Tseng Jong ===
The clash at Tseng Jong resulted in Indian casualties of 6 dead and 11 wounded; Chinese media announced their casualties as 77 dead. Both sides had numerous injures.

Following the clash at Tseng Jong it was clear to General Kaul that the Chinese meant to confront Indian actions. Leaving Brigadier Dalvi incharge, Gen Kaul went to Delhi to explain the situation. Arriving in Delhi on 11 he unsuccessfully tried to convince the leadership to pull back the troops to a defensible position. Gen Kaul went back to the front, but on 17 October Kaul fell ill and returned to Delhi. Brigadier Dalvi had not been informed of Kaul's departure for Delhi. Further, Brigadier Dalvi was at Zimithang, and when the attack on Namka Chu did start, he could not give out clear instructions due to cut communication lines as well as the lack of staff at Zimithang. On 20 October, when the Chinese attacked, there was no one in command of IV Corps.

=== Massacre at Namka Chu ===
The battle (Note: Katoch writes "The term 'battle' is grossly misleading, for what was essentially a massacre." Kler writes "Brigadier Dalvi expresses a doubt as to whether the 'massacre' that occurred on the morning can be 'dignified' by the title battle." Verma writes "Since the odds were too asymmetrical, the battle could hardly be called one as such.") of Namka Chu started at 5:14 am on 20 October 1962 with Chinese artillery bombardment on Indian positions in Namka Chu and Tsangdhar. After an hour, the Chinese infantry assault began. Indian defences at Namka Chu were attacked from both the front and rear. Positions of the 2 Rajputs and 1/9 Gorkhas were soon overrun with rear positions also being infiltrated by the Chinese. In one hour 7 Infantry Brigade was dismantled. By 8 am some "stragglers" from 1/9 Gorkha reached Brigade HQ. Brigadier Dalvi got permission to withdraw to Tsangdhar but since it had been overrun, he moved to Serkhim. However, on 22 October they were also captured by a Chinese patrol. 9 Punjab and Grenadiers managed to escape through Bhutan after receiving orders for the same. It took them 17 days, ending the battle of Namka Chu. 2 Rajput had consisted of 513 of all ranks out of which 282 killed in the morning and many were captured while 60 men escaped. The Gorkhas lost 80 with 102 captured. 7 Infantry Brigade lost 493 men in the morning of 20 October.

In 1989, an Intelligence officer of an infantry battalion led a patrol into the Namka Chu Valley, he has written that "There were skeletons everywhere, and we dug out quite a few – especially in the vicinity of Bridge 3 and 4, Temporary and Log Bridge. All the dog tags we found belonged to the dead from 2 Rajput, for they started with the serial number “29”. Some were probably Chinese casualties, but we had no way of knowing. There was nothing much that we could do – we just stacked them together, poured kerosene on them, saluted and cremated them."

== Aftermath ==
=== 1986 Sumdorong Chu standoff ===
Since 1962, India and China had not returned to Namka Chu until 1986. In that year, the Chinese forces entered the south of the Sumdorong Chu valley and set up semi-permanent structures at the pasturage of Wangdung. Taking up locations on multiple heights, Indian troops were able to strategically occupy the high ground near Sumdorong Chu. India and China formed a new line of actual control along the Namka chu, and the actual control line turned from the downstream to Khinzemane. India occupied and fortified it's positions at higher elevation at Lungro La area, which includes several posts such as Kyapho Post (Ashish Top Post) and Pankang Teng Tso (PTSO) lake Post.

== Bibliography ==
- Deepak, B. R. (2016), India and China: Foreign Policy Approaches and Responses, Vij Books India Pvt Ltd, ISBN 978-93-85563-46-1
- Hoffmann, Steven A. (1990), India and the China Crisis, University of California Press, ISBN 978-0-520-06537-6
- Raghavan, Srinath (2010), War and Peace in Modern India, Palgrave Macmillan, ISBN 978-1-137-00737-7
- Sinha, P.B.; Athale, A.A.; Prasad, S. N. (1992), History of the Conflict with China, 1962 (PDF), History Division, Ministry of Defence, Government of India
- Katoch, Dhruv (2013), "The India–China War of 1962: Army Operations", in Singh, Air Commodore Jasjit (ed.), China's India War, 1962: Looking Back to See the Future, KW Publishers Pvt Ltd, pp. 74–96, ISBN 9789385714795
- Kler, Gurdip Singh (1995), Unsung Battles of 1962, Lancer, ISBN 9781897829097
- Sandhu, P. J. S.; Shankar, Vinay; Dwivedi, G. G.; Kumar, Bharat; Kalha, Ranjit Singh; Tripathi, Bhavna (2015), 1962: A View from the Other Side of the Hill (A United Service Institution Study), Vij Books India, ISBN 9789384464370
- Van Eekelen, Willem Frederik (1967), Indian Foreign Policy and the Border Dispute with China, Springer, ISBN 978-94-017-6555-8
- Verma, Ashok Kalyan (1998), Rivers of Silence: Disaster on River Nam Ka Chu, 1962 and the Dash to Dhaka Across River Meghna During 1971, Lancer Publishers, ISBN 9781897829349

Primary sources

- India. Ministry of External Affairs, ed. (1959), Notes, Memoranda and Letters Exchanged and Agreements Signed Between the Governments of India and China: 1954-1959 (PDF), Ministry of External Affairs
- India. Ministry of External Affairs, ed. (1959), Notes, Memoranda and Letters Exchanged and Agreements Signed Between the Governments of India and China: September - November 1959, White Paper No. II (PDF), Ministry of External Affairs
- India. Ministry of External Affairs, ed. (1960), Notes, Memoranda and Letters Exchanged and Agreements Signed Between the Governments of India and China: November 1959 - March 1960, White Paper No. III (PDF), Ministry of External Affairs
- India. Ministry of External Affairs, ed. (1960), Notes, Memoranda and Letters Exchanged and Agreements Signed Between the Governments of India and China: April - November 1960, White Paper No. IV (PDF), Ministry of External Affairs
- India. Ministry of External Affairs, ed. (1961), Notes, Memoranda and Letters Exchanged and Agreements Signed Between the Governments of India and China: November 1960 - November 1961, White Paper No. V (PDF), Ministry of External Affairs
- India. Ministry of External Affairs, ed. (1962), Notes, Memoranda and Letters Exchanged and Agreements Signed Between the Governments of India and China: November 1961 - June 1962, White Paper No. VI (PDF), Ministry of External Affairs
- India. Ministry of External Affairs, ed. (1962), Notes, Memoranda and Letters Exchanged and Agreements Signed Between the Governments of India and China: July 1962 - October 1962, White Paper No. VII (PDF), Ministry of External Affairs
- India. Ministry of External Affairs, ed. (1963), Notes, Memoranda and Letters Exchanged and Agreements Signed Between the Governments of India and China: October 1962 - January 1963, White Paper No. VIII (PDF), Ministry of External Affairs
