= Krishnaswamy Sundarji =

Chief of the Army Staff (India) from 1986 to 1988

General Krishnaswamy Sundararajan PVSM
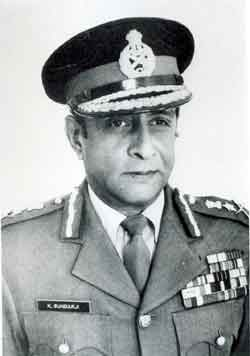

13th Chief of the Army Staff
- In office 1 February 1986 – 31 May 1988
- President: Zail Singh; R. Venkataraman
- Prime Minister: Rajiv Gandhi
- Preceded by: Arun Shridhar Vaidya
- Succeeded by: Vishwa Nath Sharma

Personal details
- Born: Krishnaswamy Sundararajan; 28 April 1928 Chengelpet, Madras Presidency, British India (Present-day Chengalpattu, Chengalpattu district, Tamil Nadu, India)
- Died: 8 February 1999 (aged 70)
- Spouse(s): Padma Sundarji (Died); Vani Sundarji
- Children: Vikram Sundarji (son)
- Awards: Param Vishisht Seva Medal; Mentioned in dispatches
- Nickname(s): KS Sundra, Sundarji

Military service
- Allegiance: British India; India
- Branch/service: British Indian Army; Indian Army
- Years of service: 1945–1988
- Rank: General
- Unit: Mahar Regiment
- Commands: Western Army; XXXIII Corps; 1st Armoured Division
- Battles/wars: Second World War; Indo-Pakistani War of 1947; Congo Crisis; Indo-Pakistani War of 1965; Indo-Pakistani War of 1971; Operation Brasstacks; Sri Lankan Civil War; Sumdorong Chu standoff

General Krishnaswamy "Sundarji" Sundararajan, PVSM (28 April 1928 – 8 February 1999) was the Chief of the Army Staff of the Indian Army from 1986 to 1988. He was the last former British Indian Army officer to command the Indian Army.

During his army career, he had commanded the Operation Blue Star under orders from Indira Gandhi to clear the Golden Temple shrine. Widely respected as a scholar warrior, he was regarded as one of the most promising generals of Independent India. He introduced a number of technology initiatives to the Indian Army. He was also questioned for his role in recommending the Bofors howitzer in the Bofors scandal. As the Chief of the Army Staff, he planned and executed Operation Brasstacks, a major military exercise, along the Rajasthan border.

== Early life and education ==
Sundarji was born in a Tamil Hindu Brahmin family in Chengelpet, Madras Presidency, British India on 28 April 1928. His official name was Krishnaswamy Sundararajan, but he was popularly known by the informal name of Sundarji. He studied at the Madras Christian College only to leave it before receiving a degree. Later in his career, he graduated from the Defence Services Staff College at Wellington, Tamil Nadu. He also studied at the Army Command and General Staff College at Fort Leavenworth in the US, and the National Defence College in New Delhi. He held a Master of Arts in international studies from the University of Allahabad and an MSc in defence studies from Madras University.

== Military career ==
Sundarji joined the British Indian Army in 1945 during the Second World War, though the war ended before he could see any active service. On 28 April 1946, he was given an emergency commission as a second lieutenant in the Mahar Regiment. His early career as an army officer involved operating in the troublesome areas of the North-West Frontier Province and then in Jammu and Kashmir.

In the period following India's independence, he saw action in Kargil district, Jammu and Kashmir, during the decisive victory in Indo-Pakistani War of 1947–1948. In 1963, he served in the UN mission in the Congo, where he was chief of staff of the Katanga command and was mentioned in dispatches for his gallantry.

Sundarji served as the commanding officer of an infantry battalion during the Indo-Pakistani War of 1965 won comprehensively by India. He played an important role as brigadier general staff of a corps in the Rangpur sector of Bangladesh, during the Indo-Pakistani War of 1971. This war led to the liberation of Bangladesh. As an acting brigadier, he was appointed Deputy Military Secretary, Army HQ, on 20 January 1973.

Sundarji was promoted to major general on 26 July 1974. For the first time in the history of the Indian Army, an infantry officer became the general officer commanding of the elite 1st Armoured Division. He was chosen by General K. V. Krishna Rao to be part of a small team for reorganising the Indian Army, especially with regard to technology. He raised the Mechanised Infantry Regiment by amalgamating various battalions from the army's premier infantry regiments.

=== Operation Blue Star ===
He was promoted to lieutenant general on 5 February 1979. In 1984, he led Operation Blue Star, intended to evict Khalistani terrorists who had occupied the Golden Temple in Amritsar. He later said "We went inside with humility in our hearts and prayers on our lips". According to his wife, Sundarji emerged a changed man after this operation.

=== Chief of Army Staff ===
In 1986, he was promoted to general and appointed Chief of the Army Staff (COAS). After taking over as COAS, he wrote a letter to his soldiers warning of deteriorating standards, and the evil of sycophancy. His operation at Sumdorong Chu in 1986, known as Operation Falcon, was widely praised. The Chinese had occupied Sumdorong Chu, and Sundarji used the Indian Air Force's new airlift capability to land a brigade in Zimithang, north of Tawang. Indian forces took up positions on the Hathung La ridge, across the Namka Chu river, where India had faced a humiliating defeat in 1962. The Chinese responded with a counter-build-up and adopted a belligerent tone. Western diplomats predicted war, and some of Prime Minister Rajiv Gandhi's advisers blamed Sundarji's recklessness. But Sundarji stood by his steps, at one point telling a senior aide, "Please make alternate arrangements if you think you are not getting adequate professional advice." The confrontation petered out.

He was also involved in Operation Brasstacks, a large-scale mechanised artillery and war gaming effort in July 1986 near the Pakistan border, which led to similar Pakistani buildup. The situation was defused through diplomatic talks in February 1987.

=== Operation Pawan ===
In 1987, the Indian government forced Sri Lankan president to accept a ceasefire agreement with LTTE and the Indian Peace Keeping Force was sent to Jaffna to disarm the Liberation Tigers of Tamil Eelam (LTTE). However, the Indian Army had no experience in unconventional jungle warfare and took heavy casualties. Among the few successes was the bombing of the LTTE controlled jetties by the Indian Navy Marine Commandos, then known as the Indian Navy Special Commando Force. The Indian Peace Keeping Force force was withdrawn in 1990.

== Nuclear policy ==
Sundarji was amongst the core team that created Indian nuclear policy. As a senior army general, he wrote the Indian Nuclear Doctrine along with Admiral R.H. Tahiliani. Post retirement, he was unhappy with the lack of response among politicians regarding nuclear security, and wrote the book Blind Men of Hindustan in 1993, which discussed nuclear strategy for India and compared India's nuclear policy to six blind men who misinterpret an elephant by touching parts of it.

== Legacy ==
Sundarji was amongst the most far-sighted armoured corps commanders in the Indian Army. Despite being commissioned in the infantry, he was a keen student and admirer of tank warfare. He pioneered various operational guidelines and challenged his commanders to push the machines and men to the limits. In various exercises, he is known to have ordered tanks full speed up sand dunes in the Thar Desert in 70 degree heat. Amongst other things, he designed the all black uniform of the Armoured Corps. He then went on to create the Mechanised Infantry Regiment. With emphasis on speed, technology and mobile weaponry, it is now an integral part of the Indian strike corps.

Sundarji can also be credited with shaping modern Indian Army thinking. In his stint as the commandant of the College of Combat (now Army War College, Mhow), he practically rewrote the war manual with emphasis on speed, decisive action, technology and armour. Sundarji was also one of the few to predict the total rout of the Iraqi forces in the Gulf War. Writing for India Today, he saw what superior air power and technology could do.

He also left behind a partially completed autobiography titled Of Some Consequence: A Soldier Remembers, of which he had completed 33 episodes out of a planned 105.

== Personal life ==
Sundarji married Padma Sundarji when he was a major. They had two children, Pria and Vikram. In 1978, when he was serving as general officer commanding XXXIII Corps in the Eastern Command, she died of cancer at the Army Hospital, Delhi Cantonment. Later, he married for the second time. His second wife, Vani, wrote the introductory chapter of Sundarji's memoirs Of some consequence – A soldier remembers, which was published after his death.

== Death ==
In January 1998, Sundarji was diagnosed with motor neuron disease, from which he died on 8 February 1999 at the age of 70.

== Honours and awards ==

	Param Vishisht Seva Medal	General Service Medal 1947	
Samanya Seva Medal	Samar Seva Star	Paschimi Star	Raksha Medal
Sangram Medal	Sainya Seva Medal	Indian Independence Medal	25th Anniversary of Independence Medal
30 Years Long Service Medal	20 Years Long Service Medal	9 Years Long Service Medal	War Medal: 1939–1945

== Dates of rank ==
Insignia	Rank	Component	Date of rank
	Second Lieutenant	British Indian Army	28 April 1946 (emergency); 28 January 1947 (substantive)
	Second Lieutenant	Indian Army	15 August 1947 (Note: Upon independence in 1947, India became a Dominion within the British Commonwealth of Nations. As a result, the rank insignia of the British Army, incorporating the Tudor Crown and four-pointed Bath Star ("pip"), was retained, as George VI remained Commander-in-Chief of the Indian Armed Forces. After 26 January 1950, when India became a republic, the President of India became Commander-in-Chief, and the Ashoka Lion replaced the crown, with a five-pointed star being substituted for the "pip.")
	Lieutenant	Indian Army	30 October 1949 (seniority from 28 July 1948)
	Lieutenant	Indian Army	26 January 1950 (recommissioning and change in insignia)
	Captain	Indian Army	1953
	Major	Indian Army	28 January 1960
	Lieutenant Colonel	Indian Army	26 November 1965
	Colonel	Indian Army	17 December 1970
	Brigadier	Indian Army	1971 (acting); 24 January 1972 (substantive)
	Major General	Indian Army	26 July 1974
	Lieutenant-General	Indian Army	5 February 1979
	General (COAS)	Indian Army	1 February 1986

== Notes ==
Military offices
Preceded by Radhakrishna Hariram Tahiliani	Chairman of the Chiefs of Staff Committee; 1 December 1987 – 31 May 1988	Succeeded by Jayant Ganpat Nadkarni
Preceded by Arun Shridhar Vaidya	Chief of Army Staff; 1986–1988	Succeeded by Vishwa Nath Sharma
Preceded by G S Rawat	Vice Chief of Army Staff; 1985–1986	Succeeded by K K Hazari
Preceded by S K Sinha	General Officer Commanding-in-Chief Western Command; 1983–1985	Succeeded by Hriday Kaul
