= Anant Singh Pathania =

Recipient of Maha Vir Chakra

Major General Anant Singh Pathania MVC, MC
- Born: 25 May 1913; Village Rey Khas, Tehsil Fatehpur, District Kangra, H.P India; Punjab Province (British India)
- Died: 19 December 2007 (aged 94); Dharamsala, Himachal Pradesh, India
- Military career
- Allegiance: British India (1936–1947); India (1947–1965)
- Branch: British Indian Army; Indian Army
- Service years: 1936–1965
- Rank: Major-General
- Service number: IC-56
- Units: 13th Frontier Force Rifles; 5th Gorkha Rifles (Frontier Force)
- Commands: 4th Infantry Division
- Conflicts: Waziristan campaign; World War II; East African campaign; Battle of Keren; Burma Campaign; Indo-Pakistan War of 1947; Operation Bison; Sino-Indian War
- Awards: Maha Vir Chakra; Military Cross

Major General Anant Singh Pathania MVC, MC (25 May 1913 – 19 December 2007) was a decorated Indian Army general; the first Indian to receive a Military Cross in the Second World War, he was also the first Indian commanding officer of the Gorkha Rifles. During the Sino-Indian War of 1962, he commanded the 4th Infantry Division during a critical stage of the conflict where his leadership was criticised.

== Early life and career ==
Pathania was born the third and youngest son of Lieutenant-Colonel Raghbir Singh Pathania (1874–1915), an officer in the Jammu and Kashmir princely army, and Raj Devi Dalpatia. He was a member of a distinguished Rajput military and royal clan which had served the Dogra rulers of Jammu and Kashmir for generations. Descended from a cadet branch of the ruling Pathania Rajas of Nurpur, his paternal grandfather, Major-General Sardar Bahadur Nihal Singh Pathania (1853–1926), had been the commander of the Jammu and Kashmir army, leading them in the 1891 Hunza campaign and in the Black Mountain Expedition; his maternal grandfather Baj Singh Dalpatia had been a general during campaigns in Chitral. Pathania's father was killed during the First World War in Tanganyika while leading the 2nd Kashmiri Rifles during the East African Campaign.

Pathania had two elder brothers, Baldev Singh Pathania (1897–1985), who served as Military Secretary to Maharaja Hari Singh and who eventually retired as dewan of the princely state of Poonch, and Harnam Singh Pathania (1900-?), who became Chief Conservator of Forests in the state.

Pathania was educated at Ranbir High School in Jammu. Commissioned into the 13th Frontier Force Rifles on 1 February 1936, he served on the North-West Frontier during the Waziristan campaign. As a temporary captain during the East African Campaign, he fought in the Battle of Keren as a company commander and was awarded a Military Cross (MC) for his heroism. According to author Antony Brett: "Although wounded in the face and in both legs, he collected his company headquarters and any other men he could muster, and pushed the enemy out with the bayonet. Only then, and under orders, did he hand over the company to his second-in-command, but the latter, too, was wounded by bomb splinters."

The citation recommending Pathania for a Military Cross runs as follows:

22 March 1941

Lieut. (Ty. Captain) ANANT SINGH PATHANIA, 13th Frontier Force Rifles, 29th Indian Infantry Brigade, 5th Indian Division

For conspicuous bravery and devotion to duty.

On 17 March 1941, this officer was commanding a flank company which was heavily attacked by at least a battalion of enemy, using mortars, light mortars and grenades. When the enemy succeeded in penetrating the centre of his sector, he led his Company Headquarters and a few men whom he had collected to the counter-attack. He was hit by a grenade on the [illegible] of his steel helmet and temporarily blinded in one eye. He was also wounded in the legs, but he continued to lead his men, firing at the enemy at a few yards range with his pistol. The enemy withdrew and Company's position was re-established. He continued to command his company for another five hours under shell, mortars and small arms fire until ordered to the rear by a senior officer. His actions undoubtedly prevented the development of a very serious situation.

Subsequently posted to Burma, Pathania fought in the Burma Campaign as the first Indian officer to serve as a Brigade Major. In 1945, he was selected as deputy president of the Regular Commission Selection Board over 400 more senior officers.

== Indian independence and Kashmir war ==
At Independence in 1947, Pathania was selected as the first Indian CO of the 1/5 Royal Gurkha Rifles (Frontier Force), his parent unit of the 13th Frontier Force Rifles having been allocated to Pakistan. As CO, he helped to provide aid for refugees and local residents in Delhi during the post-Partition chaos and rioting.

His battalion was sent to Kashmir during the 1947-48 Indo-Pakistan War, where in November 1948, the Indian Army's advance towards Drass and Kargil was being halted at Pindras gorge. As part of Operation Bison, then 1/5 Royal Gurkha Rifles (Frontier Force) was deployed to capture the ridge ahead of Pindras, on the north of Gumri Nala; the resulting battle was reportedly the hardest ever fought during the Jammu and Kashmir operations. Anant not only led several reconnaissance missions but also pressed home the attack on the enemy on 14 November 1948. Despite heavy enemy machine gun fire the 5th Gorkhas achieved their objectives and inflicted heavy casualties. The victory was attributed to Pathania's daring reconnaissance of enemy positions on the eve of battle. In tribute to Pathania, the strategically important mountain top he captured was named "Anant Hill."

Pathania was awarded the Maha Vir Chakra (MVC) for his efforts. The official citation reads:

Lt-Colonel ANANT SINGH PATHANIA, MC (IC-56), 1 Bn. The 5th Gurkha Rifles

The fine achievement of 1/5 RGR during the ZOJILA operations was due entirely to the courage and fine leadership of Lt-Colonel PATHANIA.

The hardest battle fought by the infantry was in breaking the well-fortified enemy position on [the] 'ANANT' feature. The success of this operation was due entirely to Lt-Colonel PATHANIA's personal reconnaissance of the enemy defence and in finding the most suitable routes for the attack of his Bn. on [the] night [of] 14/15 November 1948. Throughout the reconnaissance stage and during the attack, this officer personally led his men. He was a source of great encouragement to his men.

== Subsequent career and the 1962 Sino-Indian War ==
On 14 October 1949, Pathania was promoted to acting brigadier and assigned to supervise the integration of the Saurashtra and Kutch princely state forces into the Indian Army. From 1952 to 1956, he served as Director General, Military Intelligence (DGMI) before being given command of a brigade in 1956. On 1 July 1959, he was promoted to acting major-general and given a divisional command, with promotion to substantive major-general on 13 December 1960. He commanded the National Cadet Corps (NCC) as its Director-General from 6 October 1961 until November 1962.

At the outbreak of the Sino-Indian War in autumn 1962, Pathania was still Director-General of the NCC. In November, when fighting resumed in Arunachal Pradesh, he was abruptly recalled to active service with only a few hours notice. He was given command of the 4th Infantry Division, to replace Major-General Niranjan Prasad under whom the division had been badly defeated at Namka Chu in the Tawang district. In 2012, The Indian Express discovered that four pages of a 40-page covering note to the still-classified Henderson Brooks–Bhagat Report, a review of the Indian Army's performance during the conflict, mentioned that then-Defence Minister V. K. Krishna Menon had been directly involved in reshuffling senior generals, including Pathania. According to the Express, sources mentioned the Report particularly singled out and harshly criticised Pathania's appointment and the performance of the 4th Infantry Division under his command. The Report noted that despite Pathania not having commanded troops for a considerable time, he was still appointed a division commander.

Under Pathania, the 4th Infantry Division was hastily reconstructed and under the IV Corps, assigned to defend fallback positions along the Se La-Senge-Dhirang axis in Arunachal Pradesh. This would allow the Army to fight an intense defensive campaign and make it difficult for the Chinese army to sustain operations. On 14 November, the Chinese forces launched a general offensive in the eastern sectors along the front, resulting in the defeat of an Indian brigade at Walong. IV Corps commander Lieutenant-General Brij Mohan Kaul had left his headquarters for Walong on 12 November, only departing with his surviving troops on 16 November. In Kaul's absence, Pathania panicked and contacted the Corps HQ requesting permission to withdraw from his positions at the Sela Pass. Despite Kaul's staff issuing a clear order to Pathania forbidding withdrawal from Se-la, Pathania continued to persist for an immediate withdrawal and spoke to Kaul after his return to the IV Corps HQ. In response, according to Kaul's chief of staff A. M. Vohra, Kaul issued ambiguous and unclear orders to Pathania. Though General Pran Nath Thapar, the Chief of Army Staff, and the Eastern Command army commander Lieutenant-General L. P. Sen, along with Director of Military Operations Palit had arrived at Tezpur to boost Kaul's morale, and though Palit pleaded with both Thapar and Sen to convince Pathania against withdrawing from Se-la, neither general wanted to interfere with Kaul's corps.

As a result, though Kaul repeatedly attempted to contact his division commander, during the night of 17 November Pathania withdrew two battalions from Se-la though neither had engaged the Chinese troops. He also closed his divisional HQ at Dirang Dzong and fled with his troops towards Assam. At the same time, the Chinese had rapidly infiltrated the Indian positions around Bomdila, encircling and ambushing the remaining Indian troops as they chaotically withdrew.

In almost every book or article written on Sino-Indian war 1962, he has been criticized for the retreat of 4th Div.

Brigadier Hoshiar Singh, the commander of 62 Brigade who had withdrawn from Se-la only after being threatened with court-martial, was killed in one ambush.

Hoshiar Singh (Brigadier) who retreated on 18 November was massacred along with 32 others by Chinese on 23 November 1962 at Phudung (two days after the cease fire was announced).

After his panicky retreat, Pathania wrote to Harish Chandra Sarin, then a joint secretary in the Defence Ministry, and requested another chance to fight, even as an ordinary soldier at the front.

== Later life ==
Pathania retired from the Army in January 1965, after being on deputation to the Ministry of Education as Director-General of the National Discipline Scheme, devised to foster national integration and discipline among students. As a retired general officer, he continued to serve in this capacity until finally retiring in July 1967, first settling at Jammu before moving to a residence at Dharamsala. In his final years, concerned about shortfalls of officers in the Indian Army, he delivered a message to youngsters that they should "serve in the world's best fighting force. There is nothing greater than wearing the uniform of the Indian Army." He died at his Dharamsala home on 19 December 2007, aged 94.

== Personal life ==
Pathania was married to Uma Katoch, who survived him. The couple had four children, Major-General Narayan Singh Pathania (b. 8 April 1945), Indu (b. 15 March 1948), Meenakshi (b. 23 August 1951) and Vasudev Singh (b. 2 July 1953).

== Awards and decorations ==

Maha Vir Chakra	General Service Medal 1947		Indian Independence Medal	Military Cross
India General Service Medal (1936)	1939–1945 Star	Africa Star	Burma Star	War Medal 1939–1945

== Dates of rank ==
Insignia	Rank	Component	Date of rank
	Second Lieutenant	British Indian Army	1 February 1936
	Lieutenant	British Indian Army	24 February 1937
	Captain	British Indian Army	1940-20 April 1942 (acting); 21 April 1942 (temporary); 3 February 1943 (substantive)
	Major	British Indian Army	21 April-31 August 1942 (acting); 1 September 1942 (temporary)
	Lieutenant-Colonel	British Indian Army	8 March 1945 (acting); 8 June 1945 (temporary)
	Captain	Indian Army	15 August 1947 (Note: Upon independence in 1947, India became a Dominion within the British Commonwealth of Nations. As a result, the rank insignia of the British Army, incorporating the Tudor Crown and four-pointed Bath Star ("pip"), was retained, as George VI remained Commander-in-Chief of the Indian Armed Forces. After 26 January 1950, when India became a republic, the President of India became Commander-in-Chief, and the Ashoka Lion replaced the crown, with a five-pointed star being substituted for the "pip.")
	Lieutenant-Colonel	Indian Army	September 1947 (temporary)
	Major	Indian Army	1948 (substantive)
	Colonel	Indian Army	1949 (acting)
	Brigadier	Indian Army	14 October 1949 (acting)
	Major	Indian Army	26 January 1950 (recommissioning and change in insignia)
	Lieutenant-Colonel	Indian Army	1952
	Colonel	Indian Army	3 February 1953
	Brigadier	Indian Army	3 February 1958 (substantive)
	Major General	Indian Army	1 July 1959 (acting); 13 December 1960 (substantive)
