= Origins of the Sino-Indian War =

A long series of events triggered the Sino-Indian War in 1962. According to John W. Garver, Chinese perceptions about the Indian designs for Tibet, and the failure to demarcate a common border between China and India (including the Indian Forward Policy) were important in China's decision to fight a war with India.

== Friendly relations ==
Numerous changes occurred in the late 1940s, with the independence of the Republic of India and the Islamic Republic of Pakistan in 1947, and the establishment of the People's Republic of China (PRC) in 1949. One of the most basic policies for the Indian government was that of maintaining cordial relations with China. The Indian government wished to revive its ancient friendly ties with China. When the PRC was declared, India was among the first countries to give it diplomatic recognition.

After coming to power, the PRC announced that its army would be occupying Tibet. India sent a letter of protest to China proposing negotiations on the Tibet issue. The newly formed PRC was more active in posting troops to the Aksai Chin border than the newly formed Indian republic was. India decided to take moves to ensure a stable Indo-Chinese border. In August 1950, China expressed its gratitude to India's attempts to "stabilize the Indo-Chinese border". To clear any doubts or ambiguities, Prime Minister Nehru stated in Parliament in 1950 that "Our maps show that the McMahon Line is our boundary and that is our boundary...we stand by that boundary and we will not let anyone else come across that boundary". China expressed no concerns at these statements.

By 1951, China had extended numerous posts in Aksai Chin. The Indian government, on the other hand, concentrated its military efforts on stopping Ladakh from being taken by Pakistani troops and did not establish itself in Aksai Chin. On various occasions in 1951 and 1952, however, the government of China expressed the idea that there were no frontier issues between India and Chinese Tibet to be worried about.

Later, in September 1951, India declined to attend a conference in San Francisco for the conclusion of a peace treaty with Japan because China, which India viewed as an important factor in this treaty, was not invited because of its status as an international pariah. In the coming years India strove to become China's representative in world matters, as China had been isolated from many issues. India vigorously pressed, since the start of the 1950s, for the PRC to be included within the UN.

The People's Liberation Army defeated the Tibetan army in a battle at Chamdo in 1950 and Lhasa recognized Chinese sovereignty over Tibet in 1951. The Indian army asserted control of Tawang at this time, overcoming some armed resistance and expelling its Tibetan administrators. In 1954, China and India concluded the Five Principles of Peaceful Coexistence under which India acknowledged Chinese sovereignty in Tibet. Indian negotiators presented a frontier map to the Chinese that included the McMahon Line and the Chinese side did not object. At this time, the Indian government under Prime Minister Nehru promoted the slogan Hindi-Chini bhai-bhai (India and China are brothers).

In 1954, B. R. Ambedkar in the Indian Upper House, said that by "allowing the Chinese to take possession of Lhasa, the Prime Minister has practically helped them bring their border down to the Indian border... Aggression might well be committed by people who are always in the habit of committing aggression." Ambedkar further urged for alliance with western world and said, "is better for us to align ourselves with what we call the free nations if we believe in freedom".

On 1 July 1954 Nehru wrote a memo directing that the maps of India be revised to show definite boundaries on all frontiers, where they were previously indicated as undemarcated. The new maps also revised the boundary in the east to show the Himalayan hill crest as the boundary. In some places, this line is a few kilometres north of the McMahon Line.

Beginning in 1956, the CIA used Indian territory to recruit Tibetan guerrillas to fight Chinese troops, with a base in Kalimpong, India. The Indian public was outraged when it learned in 1958 that China had built a road between Xinjiang and Tibet through Indian territory in Aksai Chin (historically a part of Indian state of Ladakh).

In 1956, Nehru expressed concern to Chinese Premier Zhou Enlai that Chinese maps showed some 120,000 square kilometres of Indian territory as Chinese. Zhou responded that there were errors in the maps and that they were of little meaning. He stated that the maps needed revising from previous years where such ideas were considered to be true. In November 1956, Zhou again repeated his assurances that he had no claims based on the maps.

== Tibet disagreements ==
According to John W. Garver, Nehru's policy on Tibet was to create a strong Sino-Indian partnership which would be catalyzed through agreement and compromise on Tibet. Garver believes that Nehru's previous actions (befriending China on such issues as war in Korea, the PRC's U.N. admission, the peace treaty with Japan and transfer of Taiwan to the PRC, Indochina, and decolonization and the Afro-Asian movement) had given Nehru a confidence that China would be ready to form an "Asian Axis" with India. Much misunderstanding between the two nations led to diplomatic spats over Tibet, with Nehru's move to accommodate the Dalai Lama overshadowing his other actions and opinions on Tibet, including the opinion that an armed resistance movement in Tibet would be suicidal and counterproductive. While China treated India's concerns with Tibet as expansionist, some in India claim that its concerns were in fact sentimental and culturally-linked, as Buddhist Tibet had been under influence of Indian culture for many years.

Chairman of the Chinese Communist Party Mao Zedong was humiliated by the reception the Dalai Lama obtained in India when he fled there in March 1959. The Tibet disagreements heightened in the Chinese media, with Mao himself asking Xinhua News Agency on 19 April to produce commentary on unknown Indian expansionists operating in Tibet. Mao decided on 25 April to openly criticize Nehru for his Tibet policy:

Be sharp, don't fear to irritate him [Nehru], don't fear to cause him trouble. Nehru miscalculated the situation believing that China could not suppress the rebellion in Tibet and would have to beg India's help.

— Mao Zedong addressing a Politburo Standing Committee

Tensions steadily increased between the two nations when Mao implied that the Lhasa rebellion in Tibet was caused by Indians. On 6 May 1959, Mao published "The Revolution in Tibet and Nehru's Philosophy" where he accused Nehru of openly encouraging Tibetan rebels. This publication was evident of China's perception of India as a threat to its rule of Tibet, which became an underlying reason for triggering the Sino-Indian War. India had become the imperialist enemy, with Nehru and his "big bourgeoisie" striving to "prevent China from exercising full sovereignty over its territory of Tibet" to form of a buffer zone. On the same day, Zhou Enlai lashed out at Nehru's "class nature".

Nehru and people from the Indian upper class oppose reform in Tibet, even to the extent of saying that reform is impossible...[They want] Tibet to remain for a long time in a backward state, becoming a 'buffer state' between China and India. This is their guiding mentality, and also the center of the Sino-Indian conflict.

— Zhou Enlai

India continued negotiations about Tibet. According to the Indian official history, India wished to express goodwill to China and stop the claims of it having a hostile design in Tibet.

In August 1959, the Chinese army took an Indian patrol prisoner at Longju, which falls north of the McMahon Line coordinates drawn on the Simla Convention, signed in 1914, map (27°44'30" N), but claimed by India to lie directly on the McMahon Line. There was another bloody clash in October at Kongka Pass in Aksai Chin in which 9 Indian frontier policemen were killed. Recognizing that it was not ready for war, the Indian Army assumed responsibility for the border and pulled back patrols from disputed areas.

On 2 October, First Secretary of the Communist Party of the Soviet Union Nikita Khrushchev defended Nehru in a meeting with Mao. The Soviet Union's siding with Nehru, as well as the United States' influence in the region, gave China the belief that it was surrounded by enemy forces. On 16 October, General Lei Yingfu reported on Indian expansionism on the Thagla Ridge. On 18 October, the Chinese government approved the PLA's plan of a "self-defensive counterattack" against India because of its actions in Tibet.

However, Mao decided against further escalation because he feared that India would retaliate by permitting the U.S. to station U-2 surveillance aircraft on its territory. This would allow the CIA to photograph China's nuclear test site at Lop Nor in Xinjiang. A few days after Kongka Pass, Chinese Premier Zhou Enlai proposed that each side withdraw 20 kilometres from a "Line of Actual Control". He defined this line as "the so-called McMahon Line in the east and the line up to which each side exercises actual control in the west". Nehru responded with a proposal to turn the disputed area into a no man's land.

Chinese studies of the 1990s still maintain that India was planning aggression in Tibet. Most Chinese scholars believe that the root cause of the war was India's plan to seize Tibet and turn it into a protectorate or colony of India. The official Chinese history of the war states that Nehru was planning to create a "great Indian empire". It was also insisted that there were right wing nationalist forces that influenced Nehru to pursue the goal of controlling Tibet. Zhao Weiwen, of the Chinese Ministry of State and Security, places emphasis on Nehru's "dark mentality".

China's policy on Tibet did much to heighten the conflict and tensions between the two nations. The perceptions of India as a capitalist expansionist body intent on the independence of Tibet to create a buffer zone between India proper and China were fundamentally erroneous. The negative rhetoric led to what Zhou himself called the Sino-Indian conflict. Because of these false fears, China treated the Indian Forward Policy of the 1960s, which India admits as a fundamental mistake, as the beginning of Indian expansionism into Tibet.

== Border negotiations ==
China's 1958 maps showed the large strip of Northeastern part of Jammu and Kashmir (the Aksai Chin) as Chinese. In 1960, Zhou Enlai proposed that India drop its claim to Aksai Chin and China would withdraw its claims from NEFA. According to John W. Garver, Zhou's propositions were unofficial and subtle. Zhou consistently refused to accept the legitimacy of India's territorial claims; he proposed that any negotiations had to take into account the facts on the ground. Zhou tried many times to get Nehru to accept conceding Aksai Chin, he visited India four times in 1960. However, Nehru believed that China did not have a legitimate claim over both of those territories and was not ready to give away any one of them. However, they had different opinions as to the legality of the Simla Convention which eventually led to the inability to reach a decision. Nehru's adamance was seen within China as Indian opposition to Chinese rule in Tibet, as China needed the highway through Aksai Chin to maintain an effective control over the Tibetan plateau.

According to Neville Maxwell, Nehru was not ready to simply concede the territory and leave negotiations at that. He was open to continued negotiations, but did not accept the idea of Indian troops withdrawing from their claimed regions. Nehru stated "We will negotiate and negotiate and negotiate to the bitter end. I absolutely reject the approach of stopping negotiations at any state." He remained firm that there would be no boundary negotiations until Chinese troops withdrew from Aksai Chin and areas south of the British McMahon Line. This was unacceptable to China which never recognized the legal validity of the McMahon Line. Nehru stated "We will never compromise on our boundaries, but we are prepared to consider minor adjustments to them and to talk to the other side about them." In light of these comments, the international community rallied behind Nehru in claiming that China was at fault in failing to conduct proper negotiations. Maxwell argues that Nehru's words were ambiguous.

According to the official Indian history:

Nehru did not agree to barter away the Aksai Chin area, under illegal occupation of China, in return for China giving up its unreasonable claim to Indian territory south of the McMahon Line.

After the talks, India produced its official reports on the talks and translated the Chinese report into English. India believed it would improve a feeling of understanding between the nations. China saw it as an unreasonable attempt by India to secure its claim lines. Nehru's adamance that China withdraw from Aksai Chin and thus abandon the highway was seen as another Indian attempt to undermine China's presence in Tibet. According to John W. Garver, China reached the incorrect conclusion that Nehru was continuing his "grand plans in Tibet".

== Early 1960s ==
At the beginning of 1961, Nehru appointed General B.M. Kaul QMG but he was influential in all army decisions. Kaul reorganized the general staff and removed the officers who had resisted the idea of patrolling in disputed areas, although Nehru still refused to increase military spending or otherwise prepare for war. In the summer of 1961, China began patrolling along the McMahon Line. They entered parts of Indian-administered regions and much angered the Indians in doing so. After May 1961 Chinese troops occupied Dehra Compass and established a post on the Chip Chap River. The Chinese, however, did not believe they were intruding upon Indian territory. In response the Indians launched a policy of creating outposts behind the Chinese troops so as to cut off their supplies and force their return to China. According to the Home Minister in Delhi on 4 February 1962:

If the Chinese will not vacate the areas occupied by her, India will have to repeat what she did in Goa. She will certainly drive out the Chinese forces.

This has been referred to as the "Forward Policy". There were eventually 60 such outposts, including 43 north of the McMahon Line.

Kaul was confident through previous diplomacy that the Chinese would not react with force. According to the Indian Official History, Indian posts and Chinese posts were separated by a narrow stretch of land. China had been steadily spreading into those lands and India reacted with the Forward Policy to demonstrate that those lands were not unoccupied. India, of course, did not believe she was intruding on Chinese territory. British author Neville Maxwell traces this confidence to Mullik, who was in regular contact with the CIA station chief in New Delhi. Mullik may therefore have been aware of Mao's sensitivity concerning U-2 flights.

The initial reaction of the Chinese forces was to withdraw when Indian outposts advanced towards them. However, this appeared to encourage the Indian forces to accelerate their Forward Policy even further. In response, the Central Military Commission adopted a policy of "armed coexistence". In response to Indian outposts encircling Chinese positions, Chinese forces would build more outposts to counter-encircle these Indian positions. This pattern of encirclement and counter-encirclement resulted in an interlocking, chessboard-like deployment of Chinese and Indian forces. Despite the leapfrogging encirclements by both sides, no hostile fire occurred from either side as troops from both sides were under orders to fire only in defense. On the situation, Chairman Mao Zedong commented,

Nehru wants to move forward and we won't let him. Originally, we tried to guard against this, but now it seems we cannot prevent it. If he wants to advance, we might as well adopt armed coexistence. You wave a gun, and I'll wave a gun. We'll stand face to face and can each practice our courage.

== Other developments ==
At a Chinese Communist Party conference in Beijing in January 1962, Chinese President Liu Shaoqi denounced the Great Leap Forward as responsible for widespread famine. The overwhelming majority of delegates expressed agreement, but Defense Minister Lin Biao staunchly defended Mao. A brief period of liberalization followed while Mao and Lin plotted a comeback. Jung Chang writes that China was prepared for war with India after the border clashes in May and June, but were concerned about the Nationalists, which had been making active preparations for invasion from Taiwan, and had moved large forces to the south-east coast.

Transcripts from the decision for war was not made by China's leaders until early 6 October 1962, and only then were war plans drawn by China's Central Military Commission. Roderik McFarquhar states, "In May–June 1962, the main concern in Beijing was over the threat of an invasion from Taiwan... Chinese leaders would have been reluctant to provoke hostilities in the Himalayas, which might have meant diverting military resources from the main danger point along the Fujian coast."

The Indian military was not ready for full-scale combat. India had just annexed the Portuguese State of India or, Goa and was facing border disputes with Pakistan in Kashmir. The Indian National Congress proposed non-violent means to solving India's problems, and Indian military leaders, who proposed that India should prepare for a full-scale attack, were ignored or dismissed.

== Early incidents ==
Various border conflicts and "military incidents" between India and China flared up throughout the summer and fall of 1962. According to Chinese sources, in June 1962, a minor skirmish broke out between the two sides, and dozens of members of the People's Liberation Army killed and wounded. Units of the Indian and Chinese militaries maintained close contact throughout September 1962; however, hostile fire occurred only infrequently.

On 2 May 1962 the Directorate of Military Operations in India had suggested that the air force should be readied for use in NEFA and Ladakh. The Air Force was considered a feasible way to repel the unbalanced ratio of Chinese troops to Indian troops and the Chinese air force was assessed as only capable of limited strategic raids which could be countered by the Indian air force. Indian Air Force soon started reconnaissance flights over the NEFA border. On 7 May 1962 Chinese troops shot down an Indian Dakota plane in which young officer B. P. Tiwari was lost. Following this incident, the Indian Air Force was told not to plan for close air support.

In June, 1962, the Indian Intelligence Bureau said it received information about a Chinese military buildup along the border which could result in a war. Information was also received that Pakistan was considering to attack simultaneously in the west. Chinese airfields in Tibet and Yunnan were addressed as a threat to Indian cities, as the PLAAF could conduct heavy bombings through their use of Soviet aeroplanes.

On 8 July, the Chinese initiated another diplomatic communication, to protest against an alleged Indian incursion into the Galwan Valley. According to China Quarterly, the Government of India released press reports to the public indicating that Indian had gained 2,000 mi^{2} of territory from the Chinese. However, in their diplomatic reply to the Chinese, India denied that any incident had taken place.

On 10 July 1962, 350 Chinese troops surrounded an Indian post at Chushul, in the Galwan Valley, north of the MacMahon Line. They used loudspeakers to obtain contact with the Gurkha forces stationed there. The Chinese troops attempted to convince the Gurkhas that they should not be fighting for India, to cause an abandonment of the post. After a fiery argument the 350 Chinese withdrew from the area.

22 July 1962 saw a change in the Forward Policy, according to the official Indian history of the war. While the Forward Policy was initially intended to prevent the Chinese from advancing into empty areas (by occupying them first), "it was now decided to push back the Chinese from posts they already occupied." Whereas Indian troops were previously ordered to fire only in self-defense, all post commanders were now given discretion to open fire upon Chinese forces if threatened.

In August, 1962, the Chinese military improved its combat readiness along the McMahon Line, particularly in the North East Frontier Agency, Tibet and Xinjiang. In Tibet, there were constructions of ammunition dumps and stockpiling of ammunition, weapons and gasoline, though there were no indications of a manpower buildup. China's preparedness for war strongly contrasted with India's, which had largely neglected its military throughout the 1950s. Nehru believed that the Himalayas were a large enough defense against China, however, the Korean war had provided China with practice in mountain combat. This neglect on behalf of India would decide numerous pivotal battles where logistical inadequacy and lack of leadership led to defeat after strong starts.

== Confrontation at Thagla Ridge ==
In June 1962, Indian forces had established an outpost called Dhola Post, in the Namkha Chu valley bordering the southern slopes of Thagla Ridge, overlooking the village of Le in Tibet. Based on the treaty map of the 1914 Simla Convention, the McMahon Line lay at 27°45'40"N. However, Dhola post lay about 3.5 mile (6 km) north of the McMahon Line The Indian government maintained that the intention of the McMahon Line was to set the border along the highest ridges, and that the international border fell on the highest ridges of Thagla, about 3 to 4 miles (4.8 to 6.4 km) north of the line drawn by Henry McMahon on the treaty map. Brigadier John Dalvi would later write of this claim: "The Chinese had raised a dispute about the exact alignment of the McMahon Line in the Thagla Ridge area. Therefore the Thagla-Dhola area was not strictly territory that 'we should have been convinced was ours' as directed by the Prime Minister, Mr. Nehru, and someone is guilty of exceeding the limits prescribed by him."

In August, China issued diplomatic protests which accused India of violating even the McMahon Line, and Chinese soldiers began occupying positions at the top of Thagla, north of Indian positions.

On 8 September 1962, a 60-strong PLA unit descended from the heights and occupied positions which dominated one of the Indian posts at Dhola. Neither side opened fire for 12 days. Nehru had gone to London to attend a Commonwealth Prime Ministers' Conference and, when told of the act, said to the media that the Indian Army had instructions to "free our territory".

According to the official Indian history, a decision was made on 9 September to evict the Chinese from the southern part of the Thagla Ridge, by force, if necessary. Two days later, it was decided that "all forward posts and patrols were given permission to fire on any armed Chinese who entered Indian territory".

According to author Neville Maxwell, officers at the Indian Defense Ministry had expressed the concern that even Indian maps showed the entire Namkha Chu valley and Dhola Post-Thagla area as Chinese territory; they were told to ignore the maps. However, Nehru's directives to Defense Minister V.K. Krishna Menon were unclear, and the response, code named Operation LEGHORN, got underway only slowly. As the Chinese numbers were exaggerated to 600 instead of about 50 or 60, the 9 Punjab battalion, numbering 400 riflemen, was sent to Dhola.

By the time the Indian battalion reached the Thagla Ridge area in the Chedong region on 16 September, north of the McMahon Line, Chinese units controlled both banks of the Namkha Chu valley. The day after, India's Chief of the Army Staff Gen P N Thapar ordered his men to re-take the Thagla Ridge. According to the official Indian history, on 20 September, Indian eastern command ordered all Indian posts and patrols to engage any Chinese patrols within range of their weapons. On 20 September, at one of the bridges on the river a firefight developed, killing nine Chinese and Indian soldiers. Skirmishes continued throughout September.

On 4 October, a new corp was created 4 corp, under Lt. Gen. B.M. Kaul, tasked with evicting the Chinese from Dhola-Thagla 10 October was the planned date for Operation Leghorn. Because of the difficulties involved in directly assaulting and taking Thagla, Kaul made the decision instead to occupy nearby Yumtso La to the west, to position his troops behind and dominate the Chinese positions.

Brigadier John Dalvi, tasked with taking Yumtso La, argued that he lacked necessary supplies and resources to take the pass. On 9 October, Kaul and Brigadier Dalvi agreed to send a patrol of 50 soldiers to Tseng Jong, the approach to Yumtso La, to occupy the position and provide cover before the rest of the battalion would move forward for the occupation of Yumtso La.

On 10 October, these 50 Indian troops were met by an emplaced Chinese position of some 1,000 soldiers. The Chinese troops opened fire on the Indians believing that the Indians had intruded upon Chinese land. The Indians were surrounded by a Chinese positions which used mortar fire. However, they managed to hold off the first Chinese assault, inflicting heavy casualties. In the second assault, the Indians began their retreat, realising the situation was hopeless. The Indian patrol suffered 25 casualties, with the Chinese suffering 33. The Chinese troops held their fire as the Indians retreated, and then buried the Indian dead with military honors, as witnessed by the retreating soldiers. This was the first occurrence of heavy fighting in the war.

This attack had grave implications for India and Nehru tried to solve the issue, but by 18 October it was clear that the Chinese were preparing for an attack on India, with massive troop buildups on the border.

== See also ==
- Sino-Indian War

== Bibliography ==
- Garver, John W (2006), "China's Decision for War with India in 1962" (PDF), in Alastair Iain Johnston; Robert S. Ross (eds.), New Directions in the Study of China's Foreign Policy, Stanford University Press, archived from the original (PDF) on 26 March 2009
- Hoffmann, Steven A. (1990), India and the China Crisis, University of California Press, ISBN 978-0-520-06537-6
- Raghavan, Srinath (2010), War and Peace in Modern India, Palgrave Macmillan, ISBN 978-1-137-00737-7
- Sinha, P.B.; Athale, A.A.; Prasad, S. N. (1992), History of the Conflict with China, 1962 (PDF), History Division, Ministry of Defence, Government of India
