= Zemithang =

Zemithang Pangchen
- Village
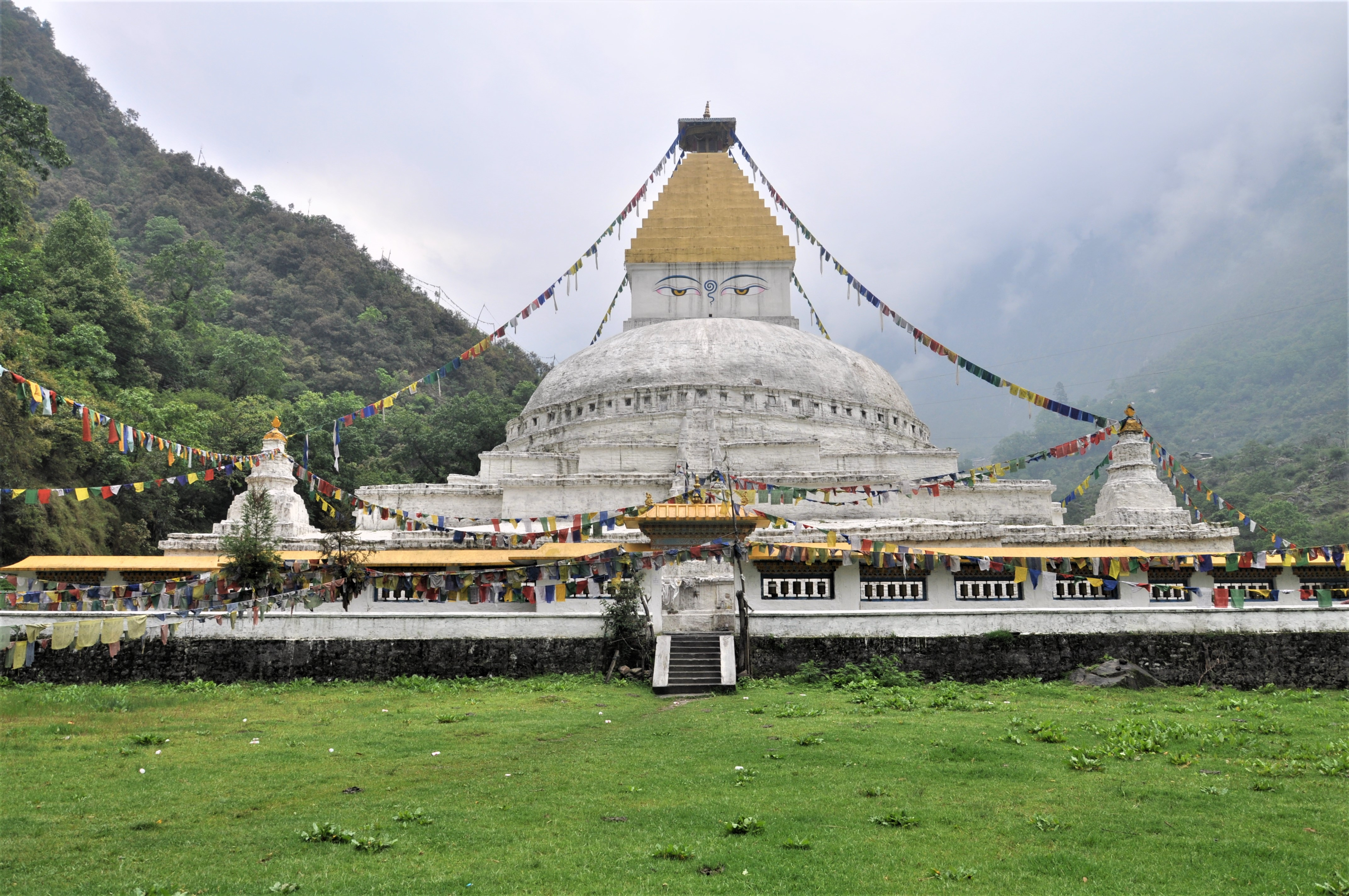
- Gorsam Chorten

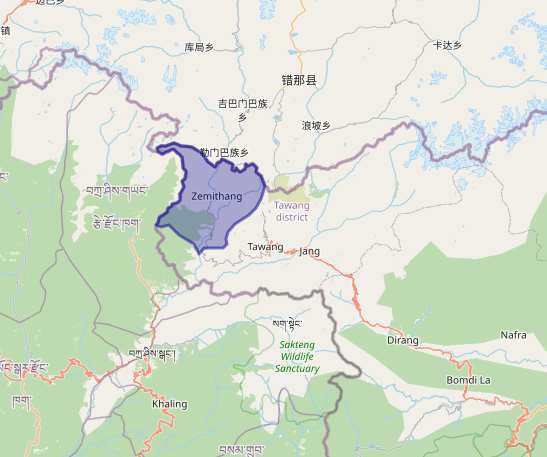
- Zemithang Circle

- Location in Arunachal Pradesh, India Zemithang (India)
- Coordinates: 27.7106891°N 91.7300530°E
- Country: India
- State: Arunachal Pradesh
- District: Tawang
- Elevation: 2,120 m (6,960 ft)

Population (2011)
  - Total: 2,498
- Time zone: UTC+5:30 (IST)

Zemithang (Tibetan: བྱེ་མའི་ཐང།, Wylie: bye ma thang (Note: also Zimithang or Jemeithang;, also Tibetan: བྱེ་མའི་ཐང།, Wylie: bye ma'i thang)) or Pangchen (Tibetan: སྤང་ཆེན, Wylie: spang chen), is a village and the headquarters of an eponymous circle in the Tawang district of Indian state of Arunachal Pradesh. It is on the bank of the Nyamjang Chu river, which originates in Tibet and enters India from the north near the locality called Khinzemane.

The Zemithang Circle is the last administrative division of India on the border with the Tibet Autonomous Region of China, along the border with Bhutan in the west. It has a population of 2,498 people by the 2011 census, distributed in 18 villages. The Zemithang Circle and the Dudunghar Circle to its south, together make up a community development block. Zemithang's border with Tibet, along the Namka Chu and Sumdorong Chu valleys, is disputed with China.

Zemithang was the first point in India that the 14th Dalai Lama arrived in India as he fled China for India in 1959 following the Chinese occupation of Tibet. He settled at the Tawang Monastery; 70 km southeast, on 30 March before moving on a month later to Uttarakhand to meet then Indian Prime Minister Jawaharlal Nehru. The Dalai Lama has reportedly recalled the area "emotionally" as "a place where I had enjoyed freedom for the first time."

== Infrastructure ==
Electricity: The region's power supply is now facilitated by the Sumbachu Small Hydroelectric Power (SSHP) Project, which currently operates with a commissioned capacity of 3 MW, which will be expanded to 6 MW by December 2027 to accommodate future industrial and tourism demands,

== Gorsam Chorten ==
Gorsam Chorten (Tibetan: གོར་ཟམ་མཆོད་རྟེན།) is a Buddhist stupa (chorten) in Gorsam, 3 km southwest of the Zemithang village. The history of the stupa remained unknown as the only written records of it were either lost or destroyed. Legend has it that it was built sometime between 12-14th century by a local Buddhist monk named Lama Sangye Pradhar to ward off evil spirits in the village. As he travelled to Bhutan and subsequently Kathmandu, Nepal to raise funds for the stupa, he was fascinated by the Boudhanath Stupa (some sources cited the Swayambhunath Stupa) and carved a miniature of it out of a radish. He brought the radish sculpture back to Zemithang, where Gorsam Chorten was built as a replica stupa based on it. It was said that the Zemithang stupa is different from the Kathmandu original owing to the radish miniature that had shrivelled. The stupa is roughly 28 m high and is the site of annual Gorsam Kora festival where reportedly thousands of Buddhists attend.

== Gallery ==
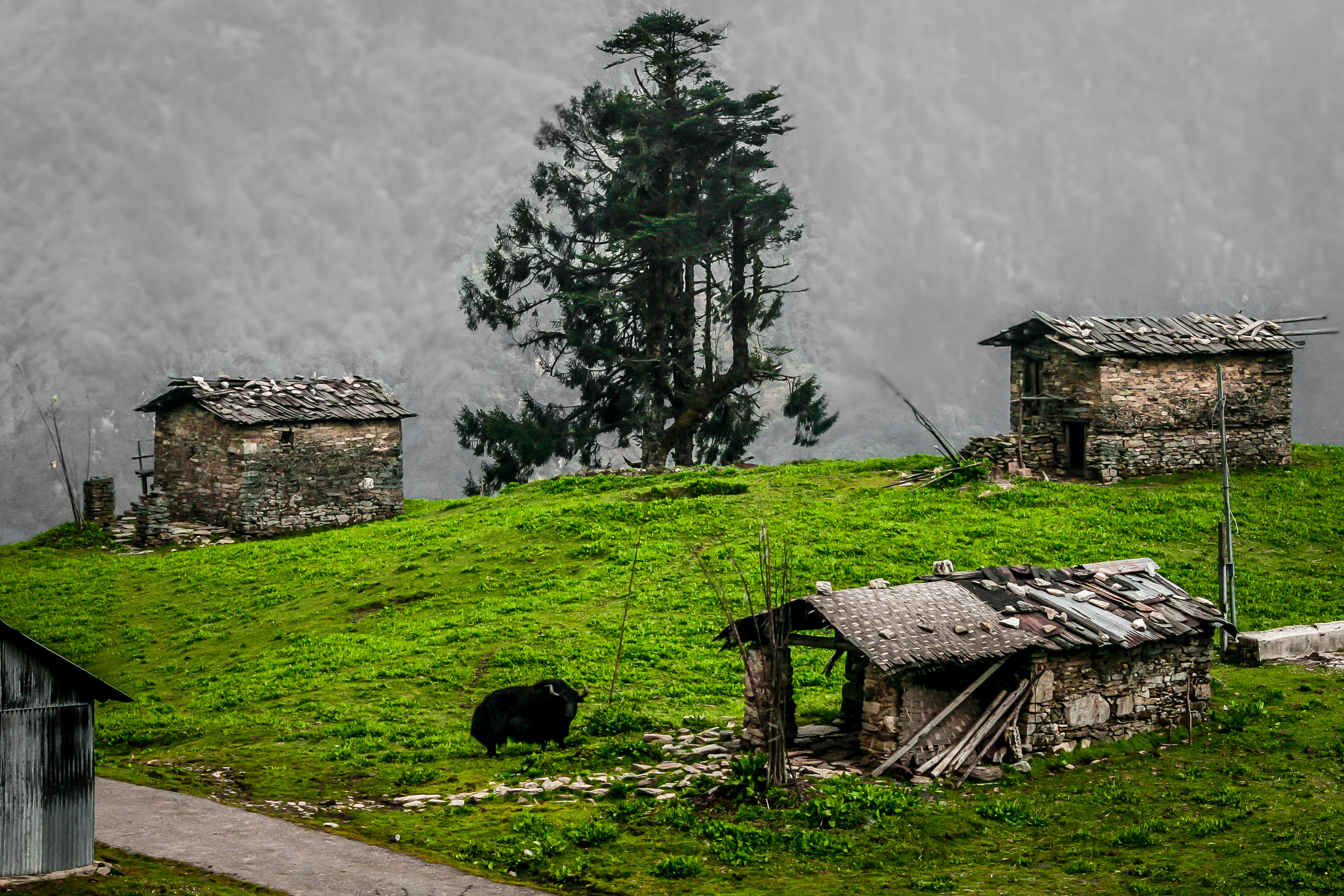
Nature near Zemithang

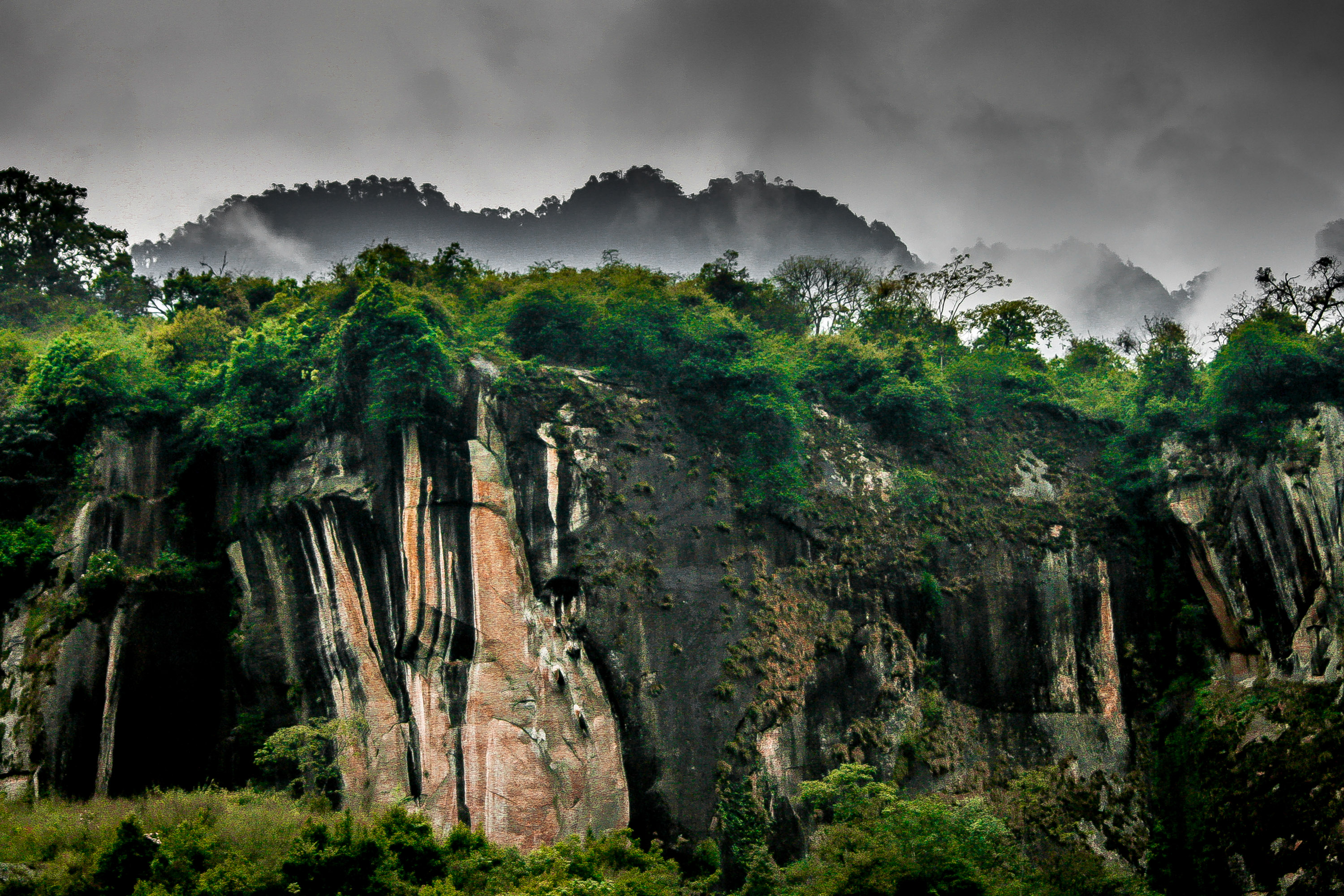
Mountains of Zemithang

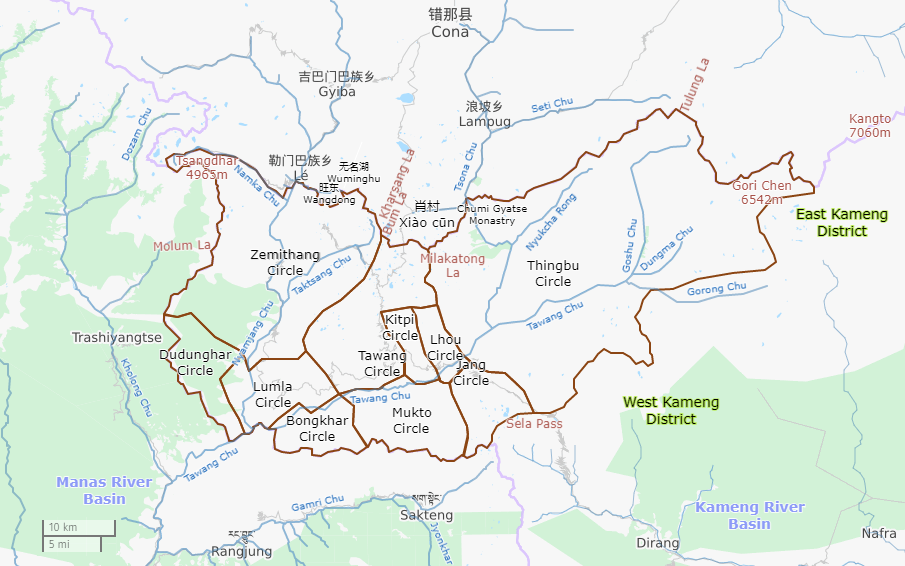
Tawang district

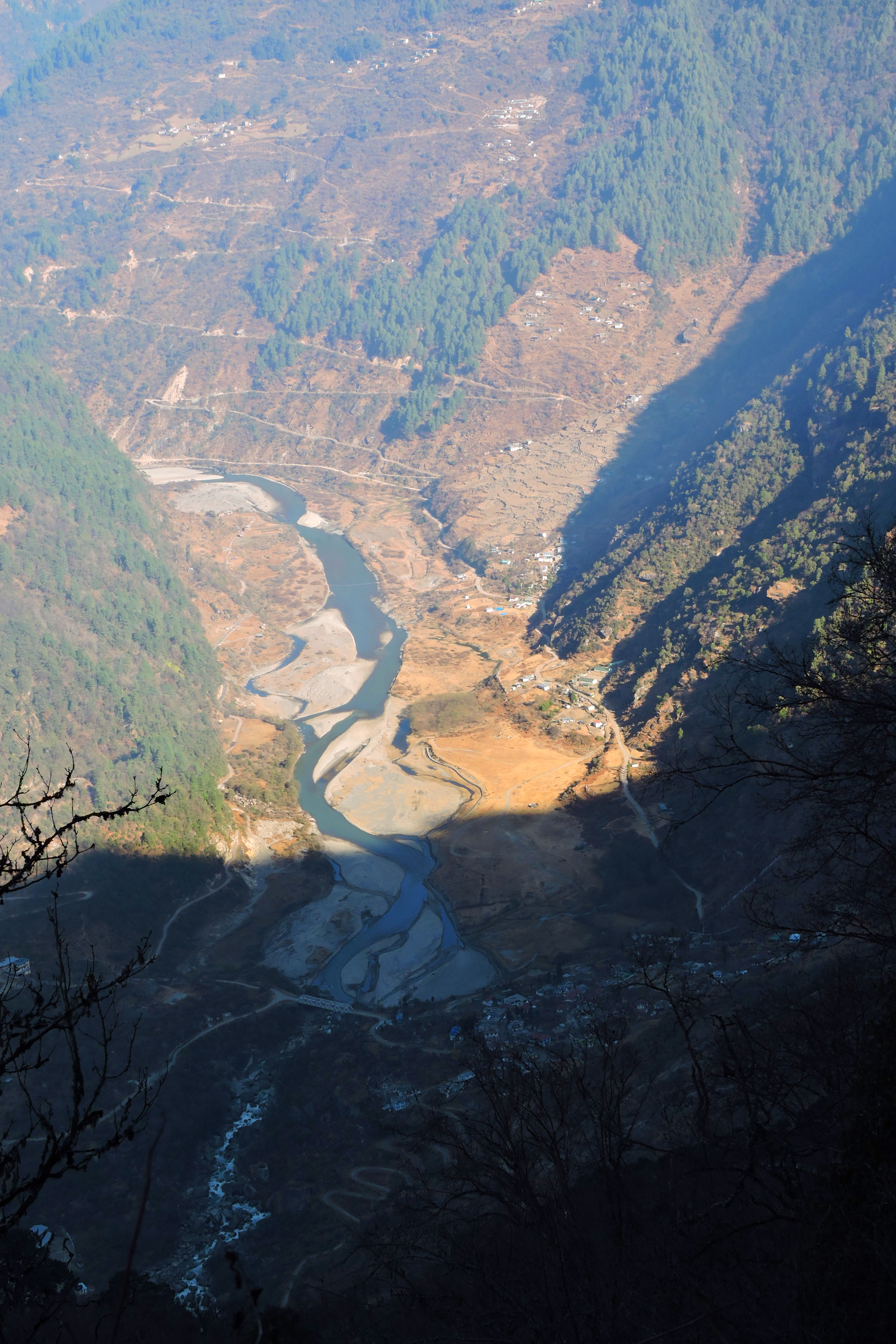
View of Zemithang Valley from above

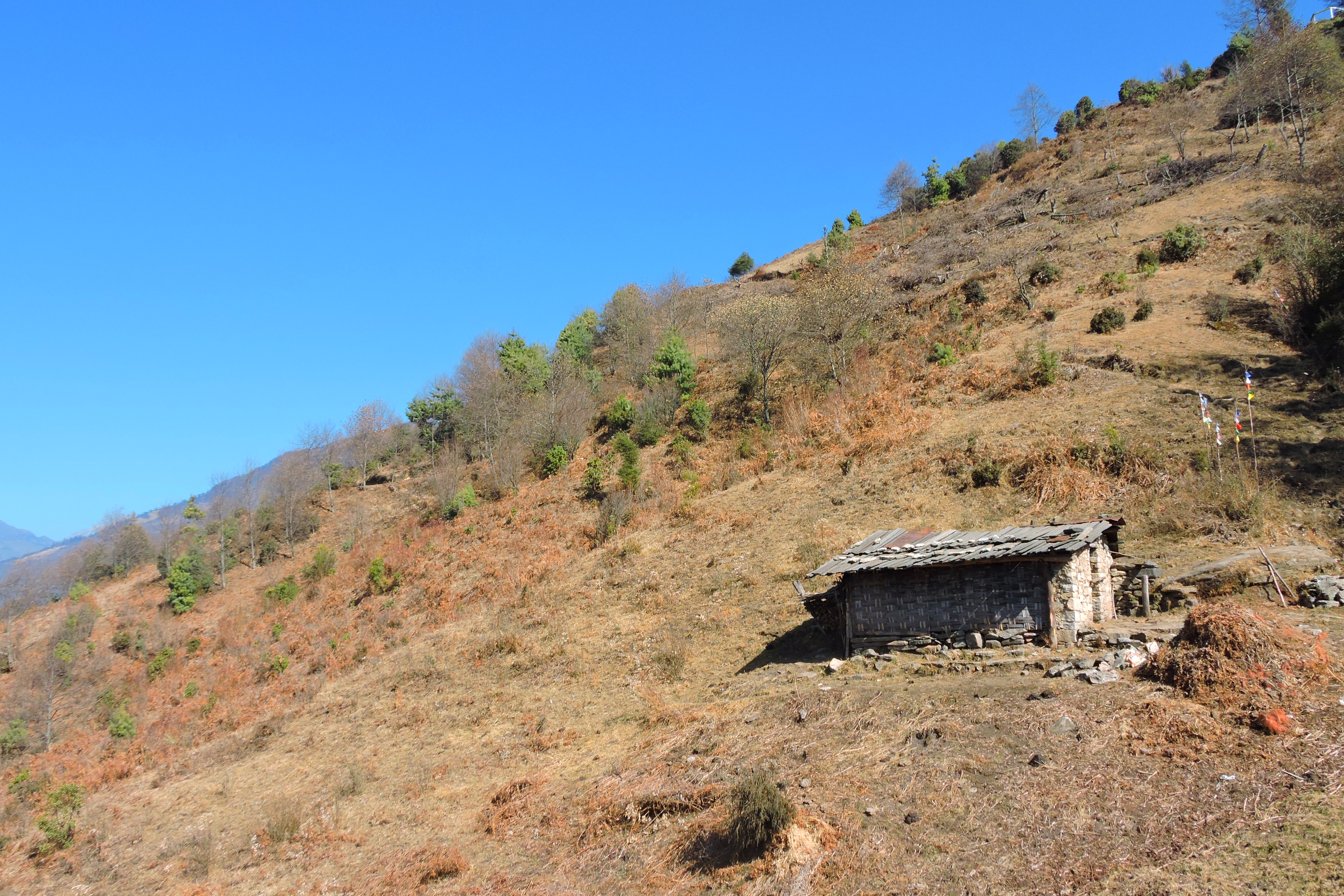
A hut for cow herders near Zemithang

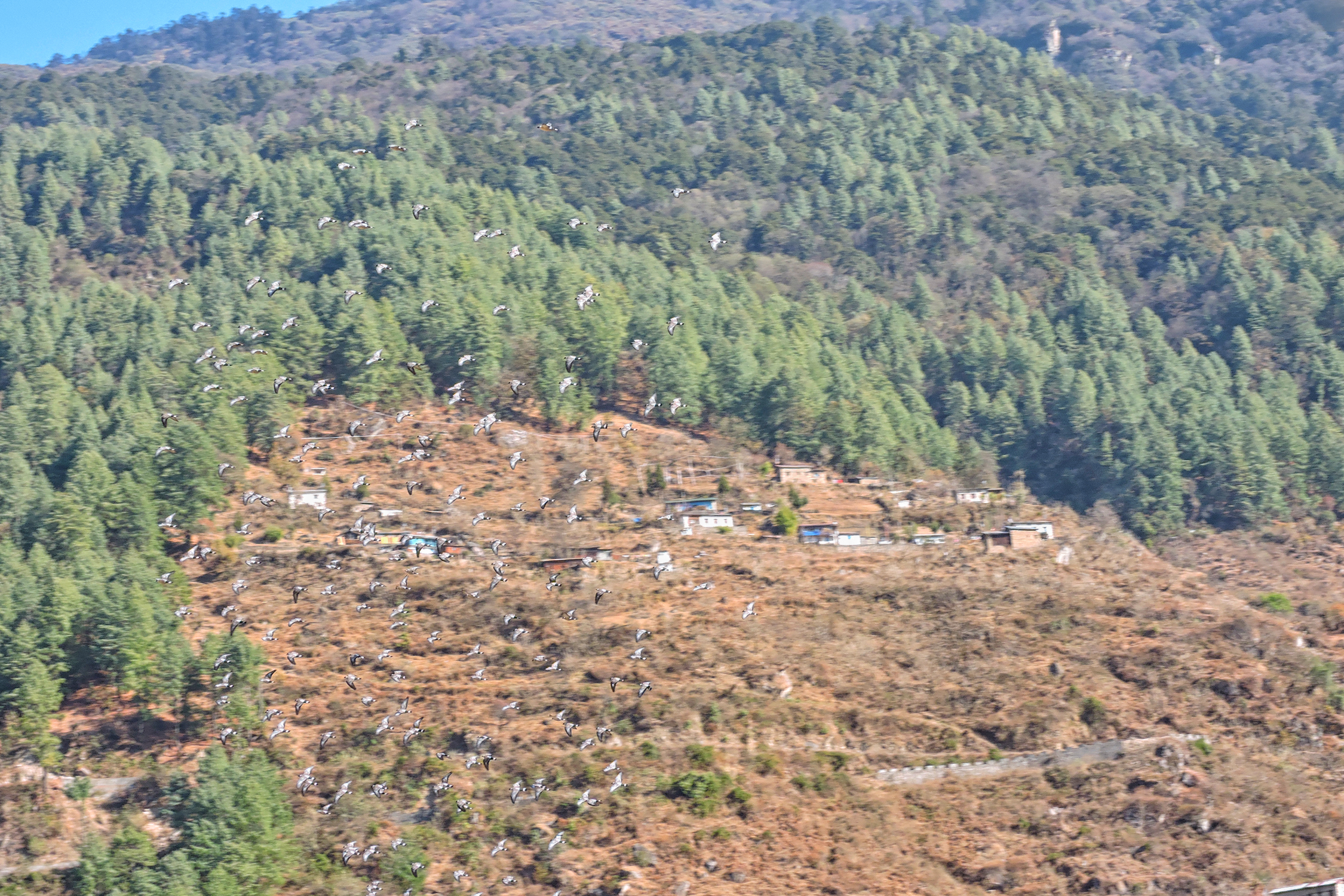
A flock of Snow pigeon (Columba leuconota) flying over Zemithang Valley

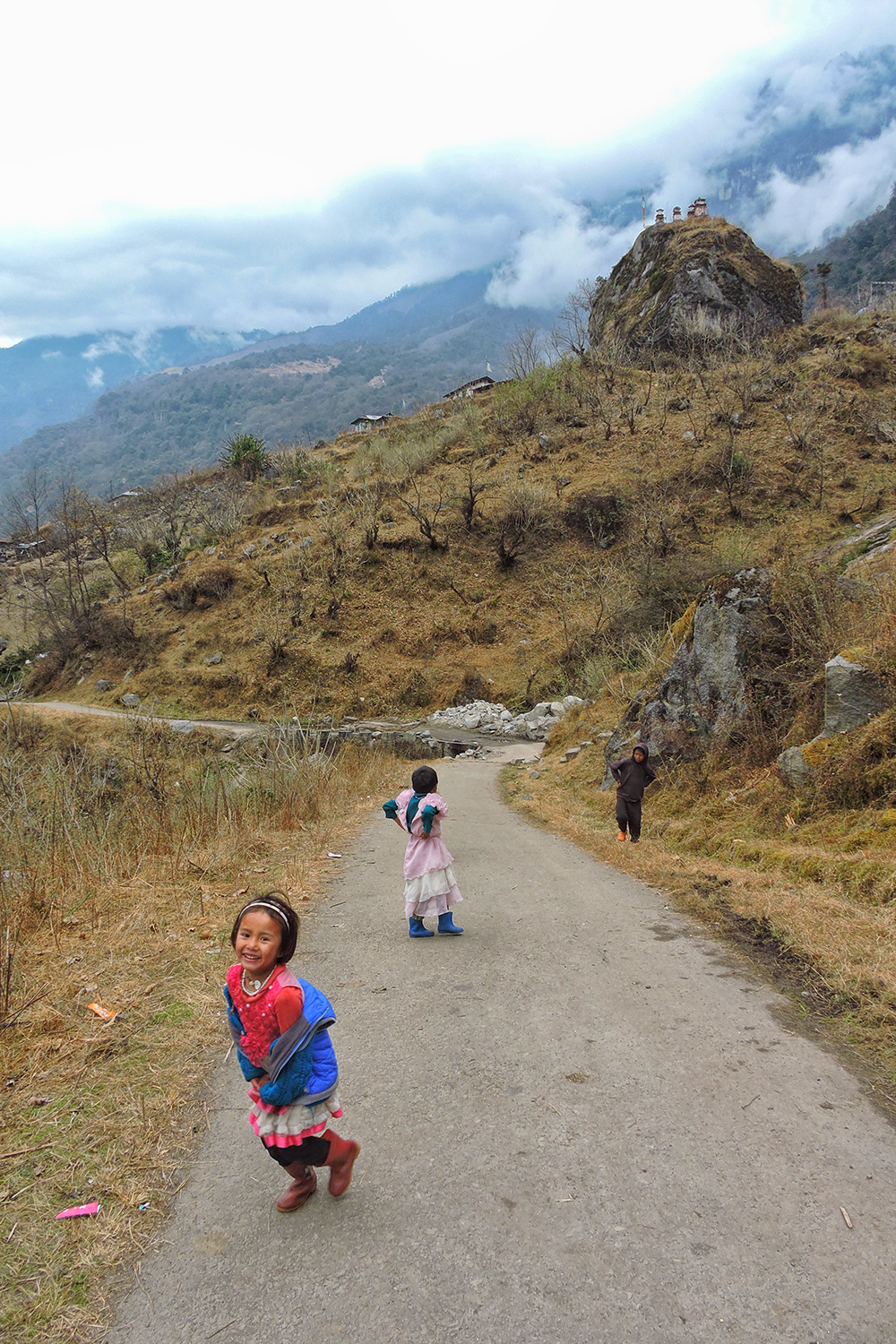
Monpa kids at Zemithang
