= Sumdorong Chu standoff =

Military conflict between the Indian and Chinese forces

Date	1986–1987
Location	Sumdorong Chu Valley, McMahon Line (Sino-Indian border) 27.7818°N 91.7813°E
Result	Status quo ante bellum

Belligerents
India	China

Commanders and leaders
President R. Venkataraman; Prime Minister Rajiv Gandhi; General Krishnaswamy Sundarji	(China) General Secretary Zhao Ziyang (China) Chairman Deng Xiaoping (China) Premier Li Peng (China) President Li Xiannian
- Location within Tibet Sumdorong Chu standoff (Arunachal Pradesh)

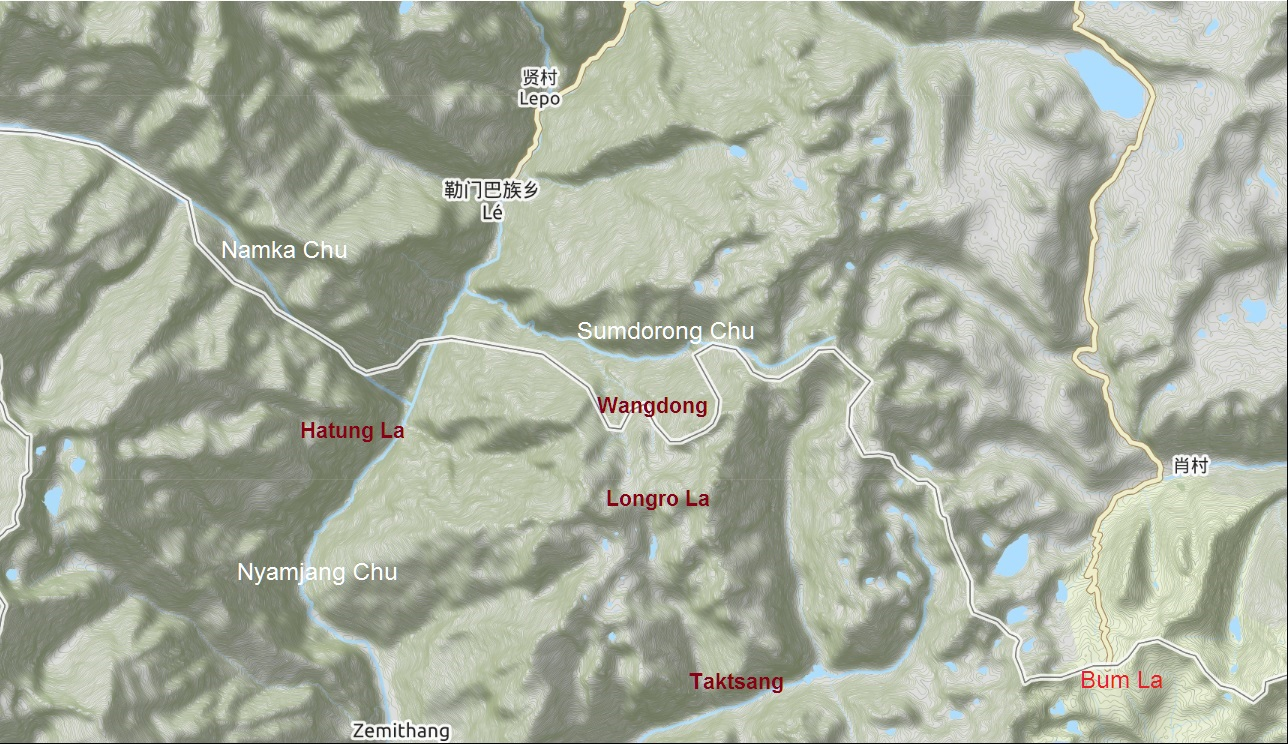
Sumdorong Chu and vicinity

Dhola Post and environs (Note: The border between Bhutan and India shown in the map was agreed much later, during 1973–1984. It was not in effect in 1962. The border between India and Tibet is OpenStreetMap's representation of "on-the-ground" situation at the current time.) (Note: The location of the Khinzemane post is 1.5 miles northeast of the mouth of Namka Chu.)

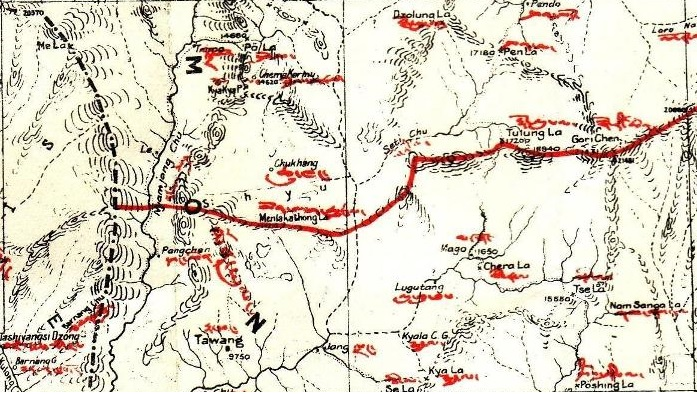
The McMahon Line in the Tawang sector.

In 1986–87, a military standoff took place between India and China in the Sumdorong Chu Valley bordering the Tawang district, Arunachal Pradesh and Cona County, Tibet. It was initiated by China moving a company of troops to Wangdung, a pasture to the south of Sumdorong Chu that India believed to be its territory. The Indian troops stood their ground on the neighbouring Longro La ridge (Note: Alternative spellings include Langro La and Lungro La.) and both the sides moved a large number of troops to the border. The crisis was diffused after the visit of Indian External Affairs minister to Beijing in May 1987. The standoff gave rise to fears of escalation. Subsequently, India and China formulated agreements for managing future border tensions.

== Background ==
=== 1962: India's Namka Chu defeat ===
Since 1962, India had not returned to the site of its major defeat at Namka Chu, an east–west running stream which separates the Thag La ridge to the north and the Hathung La ridge to its south. India's efforts to occupy the Thag La ridge was the casus belli for the October 1962 Chinese military attack on India.

=== 1962-80s: Indian need for defense north of Tawang ===
Because there were no other feasible defensive locations north of Tawang, the Indian government had more or less decided that in the event of a new war, they would abandon the Tawang town and prepare for battle at the Se La pass to its south. However, after a 1980 review, it was decided by the military strategists that it was important to defend Tawang in a future conflict. The army made it clear that the only viable line of defence for Tawang would be along the Hathung La ridge.

== Sumdorong Chu standoff ==
=== 1983-84: Indian intelligence survey ===
In 1983, an Intelligence Bureau team went to the pasturage of Sumdorong Chu which is north-east of the confluence of the Namka Chu and Nyamjiang Chu. The intelligence team stayed through the summer and returned in winter. This procedure was followed for two years. In 1986, the Indian team found that the Chinese had preceded them and set up semi-permanent structures there and were not willing to budge.

=== 1986: India's Operation Falcon ===
Under the orders of General Sundarji and codenamed Operation Falcon, the Indians undertook an airlift of troops and vehicles to Zemithang from 18 to 20 October 1986. Taking up locations on multiple heights, including the Hathung La ridge, Indian troops were able to strategically occupy the high ground near Sumdorong Chu. This was followed by more mobilisation by both sides. China called for a flag meeting on 15 November. The standoff continued until May 1987. It was during the Operation Falcon, that India also occupied the area of Pankang Teng Tso (PTSO) and Kyapho (from kya meaning deer and pho meaning cave) in 1986, which were later fortified.

=== 1987 Feb-April: India's Operation Chequerboard ===
Operation Chequerboard (or Checker Board) was a high-altitude military exercise conducted by India along the Chinese border in North East India during the spring of 1987, in the midst of the Sumdorong Chu standoff. The exercise was conducted to test Indian military response in the Northeast Himalayan region and the US and Soviet reaction to potential Sino-Indian tensions in the region. Scholar Manjeet Pardesi states that it was unclear whether the operation involved mere simulations or also field exercises. However it did serve the purpose of demonstrating to China the Indian resolve and its military preparedness.

The exercise involved 10 divisions of the Indian Army and several squadrons of the IAF and a redeployment of troops at several places in North East India. The Indian Army moved 3 divisions to positions around Wangdung, where they were supplied and maintained solely by air. These troop reinforcements were over and above the 50,000 troops already present across Arunachal Pradesh. The military exercise coincided with statements from India's Chief of Army Staff Krishnaswamy Sundarji that India recognizes the major boundary differences with China and Indian deployments are intended to give Beijing the benefit of the doubt.

General Vishwa Nath Sharma has said that Operation Chequerboard was nothing but only a telecom and headquarters exercise and that Sundarji didn't move any brigades and there was nothing on the ground. He further said that it was separately run by the Eastern Command.

=== 1987 May: Political resolution ===
At the end of 1986, India granted statehood to Arunachal Pradesh. The Chinese government proceeded to protest. But the military movements in Tawang, taken in conjunction with this political action were seen as a provocation by the Chinese. In early 1987 Beijing's tone became similar to that of 1962, and with the Indian Army refusing to stand down, Western diplomats predicted war.

The result was a thaw. Indian Foreign Minister N.D. Tiwari arrived in Beijing in May 1987 en route to Pyongyang, North Korea. He carried with him messages from Indian leaders that there was no intention on New Delhi's part to aggravate the situation. The first formal flag meeting to discuss “ the freezing of the situation” since 1962, was held on the fifth of August 1987 at Bum La in the aftermath of the Wangdung affair. Both sides decided to take up talks with renewed urgency and the following year in 1988, Rajiv Gandhi visited Beijing, returning Zhou Enlai's '60s visit.

== Aftermath ==
Both India and China realised the danger of an inadvertent conflict and, after initial posturing, a decision was made to de-escalate their deployments. The fallout from the standoff resulted in India and China restarting dialogue, which had been dormant since the 1962 war. After Rajiv Gandhi's 1988 visit, there was a hiatus of sorts because of political turmoil in India. But finally in 1993, the two countries signed an agreement to ensure peace along the LAC.

The agreement brought in an interesting concept of "mutual and equal security" where thinning of forces was envisaged, based on geographical and logistical considerations. However, its most important element was to have the two sides work out a mutually acceptable Line of Actual Control. As of now, the two sides have their own versions of the line and there are points, especially in the China-Bhutan-India trijunction, the Sumdorong Chu area and so on, where each other's claims continue to be disputed.

To strengthen the defence infrastructure India acquired the land near Lungroo La mountain pass in Lungroo Grazing Ground (LGG) 17 km away from Tawang town, and under the India–China Border Roads (ICBRs) project started to build the strategic LGG-Damteng-Yangtse Road (LDY) to the Indian post near Chumi Gyatse Falls. In 2020, India operationalised the upgraded Kyapho Model Post (also called Ashish Top Post) which includes accommodation for 80 people, electricity, running hot water, internet and tv connectivity, etc.

== See also ==
- Sino-Indian border dispute
- Sino-Indian War
- Sino-Indian border clashes and standoffs: 1967, 2013, 2017, 2020

== Bibliography ==
- "China and South Asia (July–September 1986)". China Report. 23 (1): 113–139. February 1987. doi:10.1177/000944558702300111. S2CID 220874000.
- Lintner, Bertil (2018), China's India War: Collision Course on the Roof of the World, OUP India, ISBN 978-0-19-909163-8
- Pardesi, Manjeet S. (2020). "Managing the 1986-87 Sino-Indian Sumdorong Chu Crisis". India Review. 18 (5): 534–551. doi:10.1080/14736489.2019.1703364. ISSN 1473-6489. S2CID 213073300.
