= Sankhol =

- Village
- Location in Haryana, India Sankhol (India)
- Coordinates: 28.71432°N 76.90133°E
- Country: India
- State: Haryana
- District: Jhajjar
- Established: 5 November 1615
- Founder: Ch. Sukhla Rathi

Government
  - Body: Gram Panchayat

Population (2001)
  - Total: 5,178

Languages
  - Official: Hindi, Haryanvi
- Time zone: UTC+5:30 (IST)
- Postal code: 124508 (previously 124507)
- Vehicle registration: HR 13
- Website: haryana.gov.in

Sankhol is a village located in Bahadurgarh, just 30 km from Jhajjar city in Jhajjar district, Haryana, India and along NH 9 (formerly NH 10). Sankhol is part of the Bahadurgarh Assembly constituency (No. 64). The village has four polling stations (No. 56, 57, 58, 59). The village has been created in 1615, making it 409 years old (as of 2018). It is estimated that approximately 25–30 generations of people have been born in Sankhol since.

== Demographics ==
According to the 2001 census of India, Sankhol had a population of 5178. Males constitute 54% of the population and females 46%. Sankhol has an average literacy rate of 70%, higher than the national average of 59.5%: male literacy is 78%, and female literacy is 60%. In Sankhol, 13% of the population is under the age of six.

== History ==
The history of the village begins on Purnima day in the Kārtika month of the year 1672 of the Samvat calendar (i.e. on Thursday the 5th of November 1615 according to the Gregorian calendar), on the day of the Guru Nanak Jayanti celebration. On this day, Chief Sukhla Rathi established the village of Sankhol along with people from 7 different casts. Sukhla Rathi was a Kshatriya Jat originally from Tungdesh (now Prabhas Patanin Gujarat) and moved to Sankhol in search for a better life. During his journey, he went through Hastinapur, Tamargarh, Delhi (Mehrauli), Gopalgarh, Hariyapur, Kasar, Parnala, Sarfabad (now Bahadurgarh) before arriving at the place which is now Sankhol.

In the early 18th century, the village was internally divided into three Pannas by three brothers. Each one of them became the head of a Panna i.e. Bhortha, Gullar and Baggri.

== Infrastructure ==
The village of Sankhol is located near National Highway 9, however, this road does not pass through the locality. The main artery of the village is the Delhi Rohtak Corridor road, which connects Sankhol with NH9 from both ends, as well as with the cities of Delhi and Rohtak.

Since 2018, the Brigadier Hoshiyar Singh metro station, the terminus of the Green Line (Line 5) of the Delhi Metro is located in the village. It is located on the crossroad of the Dehli Rohtak Corridor road and the Sector 6-7 Dividing road, in the South-East of Sankhol. The station is named after Hoshiar Singh, a notable brigadier born in Sankhol.

== Notable Persons ==
=== Brigadier Hoshier Singh Rathee ===
Brigadier Hoshiar Singh IOM, IDSM, Croix De Guerre was the commander of the Indian 62 Brigade stationed at Sela Pass. Brigadier Singh was killed in action, along with a few Indian troops during the 1962 Sino-Indian War. Brigadier Hoshiar Singh was commended for his bravery in the war. Prime Minister Jawaharlal Nehru, along with Pratap Singh Kairon, the then Chief Minister of Punjab, had visited this village personally to pay homage to the late Brigadier.His close friend and class mate Pandit Ram Kishan Sharma also paid homage to the Brigadier.

Brigadier Hoshiar Singh Rathee
Born	Village Sankhol, Bahadurgarh, Haryana
Died	Sela Pass
Allegiance	India
Rank	Brigadier
Battles/wars	1962 Sino-Indian war
