= Michael Dalvi =

Indian cricketer (born 1945)

Personal information
- Full name: Michael Dalvi
- Born: 18 May 1945 (age 81); Bombay, Maharashtra, India
- Batting: Right-handed

Domestic team information
- Years: Team
- 1966-67: Delhi
- 1967-68 to 1976-77: Tamil Nadu
- 1977-78 to 1981-82: Bengal

Career statistics
Competition	FC	List A
Matches	88	5
Runs scored	4635	92
Batting average	35.65	18.40
100s/50s	12/17	0/0
Top score	179	39
Balls bowled	150	–
Wickets	2	–
Bowling average	40.50	–
5 wickets in innings	0	–
10 wickets in match	0	–
Best bowling	1/2	–
Catches/stumpings	45/0	0/0
- Source: CricketArchive, 23 July 2014

Michael Dalvi (born 18 May 1945, Bombay, Maharashtra) is a former Indian cricketer who played first-class cricket from 1966 to 1982.

== Life and career ==
Dalvi is the son of Brigadier John Dalvi and was educated at the all-boys boarding school The Doon School in Dehradun. He received his undergraduate degree from St. Stephen’s College, Delhi.

A right-handed batsman who usually batted at number three, Dalvi made his first-class debut in 1966-67 while studying at Delhi University. In his fifth game that season he made 158, his first century, and 45 for Delhi against Services in the Ranji Trophy, top-scoring in each innings.

He moved south in 1967 to play for Madras. After moderate seasons in 1967-68 and 1968-69 he was more successful in 1969–70, with 347 runs at an average of 49.57, including 134 and 21 not out in the victory over Andhra, again top-scoring in each innings, in the first match of the season. He was selected to play for an Indian Board President's XI against the touring New Zealanders and for South Zone against the touring Australians.

In 1970-71 he hit 108 for Tamil Nadu in the Gopalan Trophy match against Ceylon. He began the 1974–75 season with 19 and 108 against Hyderabad and 121 against Karnataka, and a few weeks later scored 179 against Sri Lanka, which is the highest score in the Gopalan Trophy by a Tamil Nadu batsman. He scored 112 and 79 not out in South Zone's victory over Central Zone in the Duleep Trophy in 1975–76.

After a moderate season in 1976-77 he moved to Bengal, where he played for five seasons with a top score of 151 against Assam in 1977–78 in his first innings for his new team. He also played several times for East Zone, scoring 112 against the touring West Indians in 1978–79. He retired after the 1981–82 season.

He runs a resort on his estate near Dehradun.
