= Nyamjang Chu =

River in eastern Tibet and Arunachal Pradesh

- Mouth of Nyamjang Chu in Arunachal Pradesh Nyamjang Chu (Tibet)

Location
- Country: China; India
- Region/State: Shannan, Tibet; Arunachal Pradesh
- District: Tsona County; Tawang district
- Cities/Circles: Qudromo, Jiba, Gongri, Marmang, Lai; Zemithang, Dudunghar

Physical characteristics
- Source: Eastern Himalayas
  - location: Tsona County
  - coordinates: 28.4297°N 91.8596°E
  - elevation: 5,400 m (17,700 ft)
- Mouth: Tawang Chu
  - location: Lumla Circle
  - coordinates: 27.499°N 91.685°E
  - elevation: 1,040 m (3,410 ft)
- Length: 125 kilometres (78 mi)
- Basin size: 3,170 square kilometres (1,220 sq mi)
- Discharge
  - location: Zemithang
  - average: 3,400 cubic metres (120,000 cu ft) per second

Basin features
- Progression: Tawang Chu, Manas River
- River system: Brahmaputra

The Nyamjang Chu, or Nyashang Chu (Tibetan: ཉ་བཤང་ཆུ, Wylie: nya bshang chu, THL: nya shang chu) (Note: An alternative Tibetan name is Nyangshang Chu (Tibetan: ཉང་བཤང་ཆུ, Wylie: nyang bshang chu, THL: nyang shang chu; Chinese: 娘江曲; pinyin: Niáng jiāng qū).) is a cross-border perennial river that originates in the Shannan Prefecture of Tibet and flows into the Arunachal Pradesh state of India, joining the Tawang Chu river just before it enters Bhutan. The Nyamjang Chu valley has provided the traditional communication route between Tawang and Tibet. The valley near the town of Zemithang in the Tawang district, called the Pangchen Valley, is known for its serene beauty and forms one of the wintering locations for the black-necked crane.

The China–India border in the valley has been contested between the two countries since the 1950s, resulting in a clash at the Namka Chu in 1962 and a standoff at the Sumdorong Chu in 1986.

== Course ==
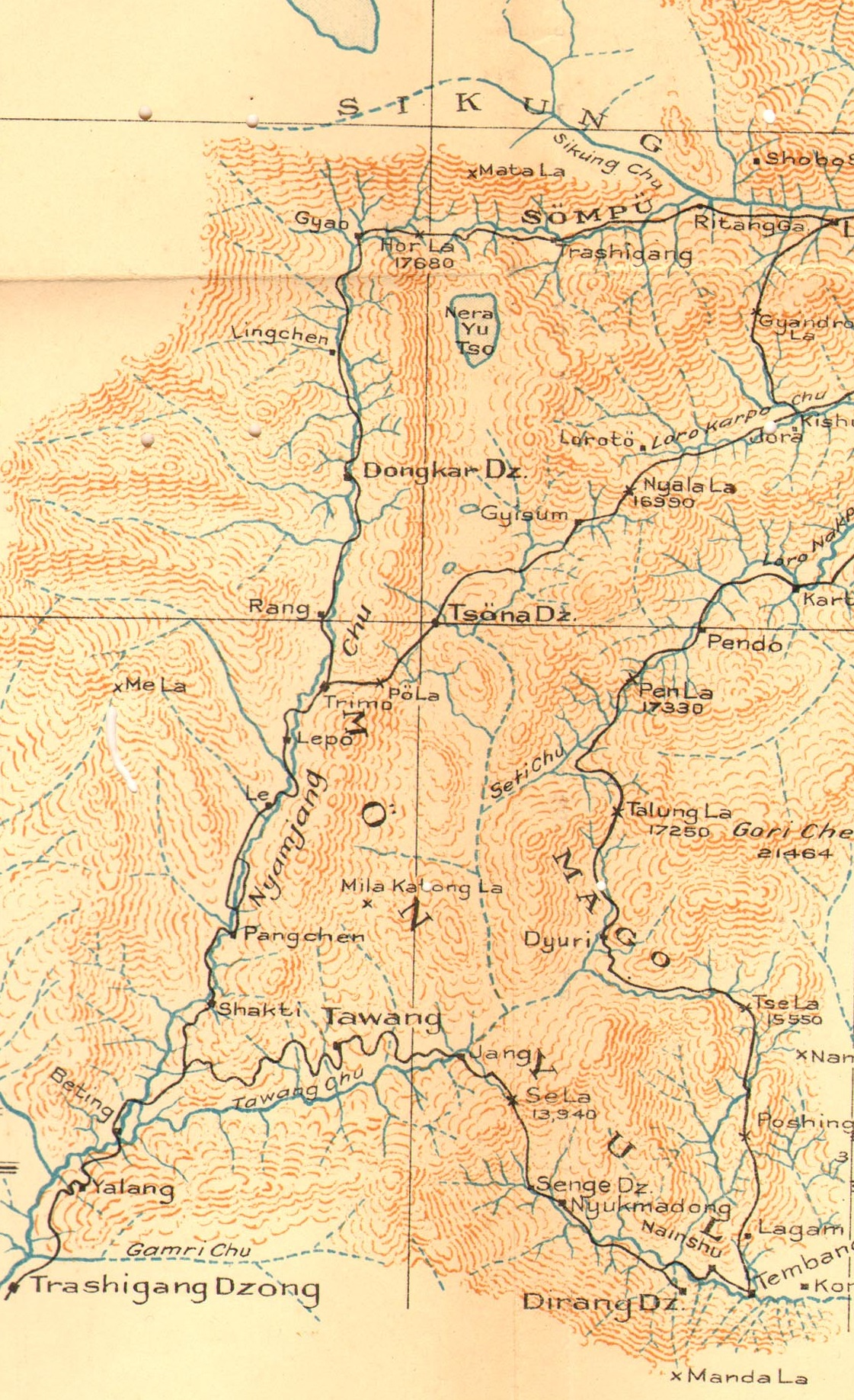
The course of Namjyang Chu mapped by Bailey and Morshead in 1913 (Tributaries Namka Chu and Sumdorong Chu not shown)

The Nyamjang Chu river originates in the snow-clad peaks of the eastern Himalayas, north of Taga in the Chudromo township of the Tsona County, at an elevation of 5,400 m (17,700 ft). Frederick Bailey and Henry Morshead, explored the region in 1913. They crossed into the valley of Nyamjang Chu from that of Nye Chu via the Hor La pass. They give the name of the village as Gyao, which appears to be an older name of Taga. The land at this elevation was only good for grazing. The shepherds lit sheep-dung fires around the campsites to protect their flocks from the wolves.

From this location, Nyamjang Chu flows southwards for about 85 kilometres (53 mi) in Tibet, passing by several towns such as Chudromo, Dongkar, Gongri, Kyipa, Marmang and Le.

South of Le (also spelt Lei and Lai), the river enters India at a location called Khinzemane at an elevation of 2,220 m (7,280 ft). The stream of Sumdorong Chu from the left and the river of Namka Chu from the right join the river in this area. The border in this area has been disputed between India and China.

The course of the river in India is through a steep gorge lined by dense mixed forest. The valley widens near Zemithang, where it is called the Pangchen valley. The streams of Sumta Chu (from the right) and Taktsang Chu (from the left) join Nyamjang Chu in this valley.

The river flows mostly southwards in India for 40 km and joins the west-flowing Tawang Chu near Lumla. After the confluence, Tawang Chu enters Bhutan within a short distance where it merges with Kulong Chu to form the Manas River, a major tributary of Brahmaputra.

== Flora and fauna ==
The Zemithang valley is one of the wintering locations for the black-necked crane, a vulnerable species of which only 4,000 are believed to be alive as of 1996.

== Bibliography ==
- Bailey, F. M. (1914). "Exploration on the Tsangpo or upper Brahmaputra". Scottish Geographical Magazine. 30 (11): 561–582. doi:10.1080/00369221408734154.
- Bailey, F. M. (1914), Report on an Exploration on the North-East Frontier, 1913, Simla: Government Monotype Press – via archive.org
- Dorje, Gyurme (1999), Footprint Tibet Handbook with Bhutan (2nd ed.), Bath: Footprint Handbooks, ISBN 0-8442-2190-2 – via archive.org
- NJC Hydropower Limited (2017), EIA study for Nyamjangchhu Hydroelectric Project (PDF), Ministry of Environment, Forest and Climate Change, Government of India
