= Brij Mohan Kaul =

Indian Army general (1912–1972)

- Born: Brij Mohan Kaul; 1 May 1912; Lahore, Punjab, India
- Died: 18 April 1972
- Relatives: Jawaharlal Nehru
- Military career
- Allegiance: (British Raj) British India; India
- Branch: Indian Army
- Service years: 1933–1962
- Rank: Lieutenant General
- Nickname: Bijji
- Service number: AI-162
- Units: Rajputana Rifles; Royal Indian Army Service Corps
- Commands: IV Corps, NEFA
- Awards: Param Vishisht Seva Medal
- Other work: The Untold Story, Confrontation with Pakistan

Brij Mohan Kaul (1912–1972) was a Lieutenant General in the Indian Army. He served as the Chief of General Staff during 1961–1962 and was regarded as a key architect of Indian military response to the Chinese challenge. In October 1962, he was given the command of a newly raised IV Corps to counter the impending Chinese invasion of NEFA (modern day Arunachal Pradesh), but it got routed by the Chinese.

He was awarded the Param Vishisht Seva Medal in 1960.

He resigned in the aftermath of the war,

== Personal life ==
He was born on 1 May 1912, in a Kashmiri Pandit family to Gaura and Jagmohan Kaul in Lahore, Punjab, British India. His birth date coincided with Buddha Jayanti. He had a sister (Dulari), and a half-brother (Shyam) and a half-sister (Nanni). He married Dhanraj Kishori; they had two daughters Anuradha and Chitralekha.

== Career ==
A King's Commissioned Indian Officer, Kaul attended the Royal Military College, Sandhurst and was commissioned a Second Lieutenant on the Unattached List for the Indian Army on 31 August 1933. He then spent the next year attached to a British Army regiment in India, the 1st battalion East Surrey Regiment, starting 5 November 1933. After his years attachment accepted for the Indian Army and he was posted to the 5th Battalion, 6th Rajputana Rifles on 10 November 1934 with his date of commission as a Second Lieutenant antedated to 2 February 1933. He was promoted to Lieutenant 2 May 1935 but by mid-1936 he was attached away from the battalion to the Royal Indian Army Service Corps, a posting that led to a permanent transfer on 18 February 1937.

At the outbreak of World War Two he was serving with the 26th Mechanical Transport Company. He was promoted Captain on 2 February 1941, acting Major on 7 November 1942 and local Lieutenant-Colonel on 14 December 1942, War Substantive Major & temporary Lieutenant Colonel on 19 February 1944 and Major on 1 July 1946.

In October–December 1946, he was the secretary to "Armed forces Nationalisation Committee" constituted by the Viceroy. Coincidentally, it was led by N Gopalawami Ayyangar, later defense minister, with members including future Chief of Army Staff General Thimayya, future Pakistan Army chief Muhammad Musa and future Indian MP H.N. Kunzru.

In May 1947, Kaul was promoted local colonel and appointed as India's defence attache in Washington. He returned to India in the aftermath of Indian Pakistan hostilities over Kashmir, and was promoted to acting brigadier in 1950 and to the substantive rank of colonel on 2 February 1951. On 15 January 1956, by now a brigadier, he was appointed an area commander in the acting rank of major-general.

In 1962, he was appointed as the commander of IV Corps in the north eastern region of India.

=== Operation Leghorn ===
In 1962, Lt General B.M. Kaul was appointed as the General officer Commanding (GOC) to head the newly appointed IV Corps at Tezpur, however no new troops were sent to the corps with only the new headquarter staff being deployed there. The entire NEFA (North East Frontier Agency), now Arunachal Pradesh was made Kaul's domain.

On his first day of assignment, Kaul flew to Lumpu and then trekked to Namkachu valley. He was the first General officer to visit the valley. Under his leadership, the Indian patrol occupied Tse Jong, a hillock north-west of the Chinese settlement. Kaul reportedly fell ill during the assignment and returned to New Delhi. During this period, he was replaced by Lt General Umrao Singh. Kaul was appointed again as GOC of IV Corps on his return after a week. The Indian patrol occupying Tse Jong was wiped out when an 800 strong enemy force raided the post subsequently.

The battle with China in 1962, in the NEFA, is also known as the Battle of Namkachu. The Battle of the Namakachu is used today to teach Indian Army officers on things to not do.

== Honours ==
Kaul was the recipient of the Param Vishisht Seva Medal instituted by the Indian government in 1960, for his work in successfully completing the construction of quarters for troops in Ambala.

== Controversies ==
In 1968, Brigadier John Dalvi, the former commanding officer of the 7th Infantry Brigade that participated in the 1962 Sino-Indian War authored a book named Himalayan Blunder, where he gave his first hand accounts and perceptions of the causes for India's defeat in the war. He was critical of Lt General B.M. Kaul and attributed the loss in 1962 war partly to him. Excerpt from the book: "He managed to keep himself away from hardship and learning the nuances of a military commander as a junior officer and later in service, managed to grab important Army senior command appointments due to his "pull". His involvement with Jawaharlal Nehru later turned out to be a major reason for shameful loss and massacre of Indian troops at the hands of the Chinese".

In 1991, K. Satchidananda Murty wrote a biographical book about the second President of India, Shri Sarvepalli Radhakrishnan, named Radhakrishnan: His Life and Ideas. In the book, he quoted the former president as having expressed doubts over the capability of Lt General B.M. Kaul. Excerpt from the book: "The General Officer was well known in the Army and Political Circles to be a "personal favourite" of Jawaharlal Nehru since his junior officer days. He reportedly received a number of undue professional favours throughout his career due to this personal connection and he made full use of this opportunity with utter disregard to the Army organisation".

In the book The Unfought War of 1962: An Appraisal, by Raghav Sharan Sharma, he has mentioned that Lt General B.M. Kaul was a distant relation of Indian Prime Minister Jawaharlal Nehru. As a result, V.K.Krishna Menon who was the then Defence Minister and Jawaharlal Nehru's close aide, appointed Lt General B.M. Kaul as Chief of General Staff, against the recommendation of the outgoing Chief of Army Staff, General K.S.Thimayya and in spite of the fact that he was an Army Service Corps officer, with no prior combat experience and having never commanded a fighting unit earlier.

In the 1960s and 1970s the term, "Kaul Boys" (a parody of the term 'call girls'), in the army referred to officers or bureaucrats who unquestionably followed Kaul, the loose term incorporated many people, such as B.M. Bhattacharjee, Niranjan Prasad, A.S. Pathania, V.K. Krishna Menon, Brigadier Hoshiar Singh, L.P. Sen, Daulet Singh and B.N. Mullik- though some of these differ according to historians. Kaul's proximity to Nehru earned him lots of suspicion from many in the army, and many officers who did not agree with Kaul's policy's careers suffered; such as Sam Manekshaw, Umrao Singh, S.P.P. Thorat, Brigadier Gurbux Singh and J.P. Dalvi.

Both the books have been highly critical about Lt General B.M. Kaul. However, Lt General Kaul also authored a book named The Untold Story, where he gave his version of reasons for the loss in the 1962 war.

== Books authored ==
He wrote his side of the story about operation leghorn in the book The Untold Story and, in another book, Confrontation with Pakistan.

== Bibliography ==
- Hoffmann, Steven A. (1990), India and the China Crisis, University of California Press, ISBN 978-0-520-06537-6
- Raghavan, Srinath (2010), War and Peace in Modern India, Palgrave Macmillan, ISBN 978-1-137-00737-7

Military offices
Preceded by S. D. Verma	Chief of the General Staff; 8 May 1961 – 4 October 1962	Succeeded by Moti Sagar
