= Hoshiar Singh (Brigadier) =

Indian army officer (died 1962)

Brigadier Hoshiar Singh
- Born: Village Sankhol, Bahadurgarh, Haryana
- Died: Sela Pass
- Military career
- Allegiance: India
- Rank: Brigadier
- Conflicts: 1962 Sino-Indian War

Brigadier Hoshiar Singh Rathi (1916-1962) OBE, Croix de Guerre, IOM, VSM, from Sankhol village near Bahadurgarh in Jhajjar district of Haryana, was the commander of the 62nd Indian Infantry Brigade stationed at Sela Pass. Brigadier Singh was killed in action, along with a few Indian troops during the 1962 Sino-Indian War and commended for his bravery.

Brigadier Hoshiar Singh Rathi (1916-1962) is not to be confused with the Colonel Hoshiar Singh Dahiya (1937-1998) of The Grenadiers of Indian Army, from Sisana village of Sonipat district of Haryana, who received the Param Vir Chakra (PVC) for displaying "most conspicuous gallantry" in the Battle of Basantar during the 1971 Indo-Pakistani war and he died of natural causes on 6 December 1998.

== Early life and career ==
Brigadier Hoshiar Singh Rathi was born in a Hindu Jat family in Sankhol village on western outskirts of Bahadurgarh city of Jhajjar district in Haryana. The Bahadurgarh City Park metro station has been renamed in his honour to Brigadier Hoshiyar Singh metro station, as announced by Haryana Chief Minister Manohar Lal Khattar, in Sept 2018. He was promoted colonel on 5 July 1962.

== Details of the battle ==
During the Sino-Indian War in 1962, Hoshiar Singh was in charge of the defence of Sela Pass of this region with a brigade of Indian Army consisting of soldiers from battalions of various regiments, including 1 SIKH, 2 Sikh LI, 4 Sikh LI and also soldiers from Garhwal Rifles.

== Death ==
Singh was killed in action fighting for the Indian Army in the NEFA region in 1962 when his party was ambushed by invading Chinese soldiers while commanding the defence of the Sela Pass.

By the afternoon of 23 November 1962 (2 days after ceasefire) Chinese troops belonging to No.2 Company of 154 Regiment (419 Unit) killed brigade commander, three officers and twenty nine other ranks while the rest were wounded or captured at Phudung near Phitang Bridge, southwest of Bomdilla.

Singh's body was preserved in Phudung by the local Monpas. Much later, Indian army officers returned to Phudung and cremated the courageous soldier with his eldest son performing the last rites.

The then Prime Minister Jawaharlal Nehru, Punjab Chief Minister Pratap Kairon along with senior army officers came to village Sankhol to console his family. On the first death anniversary, Indira Gandhi also came to meet his family in the village.

== Legacy and memorials ==
In Arunachal Pradesh, Tawang War Memorial in Tawang city and Nyukmadong War Memorial south of Sela Tunnel commemorate his sacrifice. Nyukmadong War Memorial is a 25 ft tall chorten (stupa) on 1.5 acre plot on NH-13 which commemorates Brigadier Hoshiyar Singh and other martyrs of 62nd Indian Infantry Brigade led by Brigadier Hoshyiar Singh.

In Bahadurgarh city in Haryana in Delhi NCR, the Delhi Metro's Brigadier Hoshiyar Singh metro station on the Delhi-Rohtak Road is named in his honor. 1 km further east of the Brigadier Hoshiyar Singh metro station, there a statue of Brigadier Hoshiar Singh in Mahavir Park on the Delhi-Rohtak Road.

In Delhi, Brigadier Hoshiyar Singh Marg runs south of Safdarjung Airport.

In Shamli in Uttar Pradesh, Brigadiyar Hoshiyar Singh Inter College is named in his honor.

== In popular culture ==
Recollections of the Se La-Bomdila Debacle 1962, a book published in 2013 and written by Major General Jaidev Singh Datta (Retd), who served as the Brigade Major of the 62 Infantry Brigade at the time, provides a factual first-hand account of decisions and events that led to the brigade's withdrawal, mentioning Brigadier Hoshiar Singh's leadership and ultimate sacrifice.

== See also ==
- Awards and decorations of the Indian Armed Forces
- Military contribution of Haryana
