= John Dalvi =

Indian Army general

Brigadier John Parashuram Dalvi
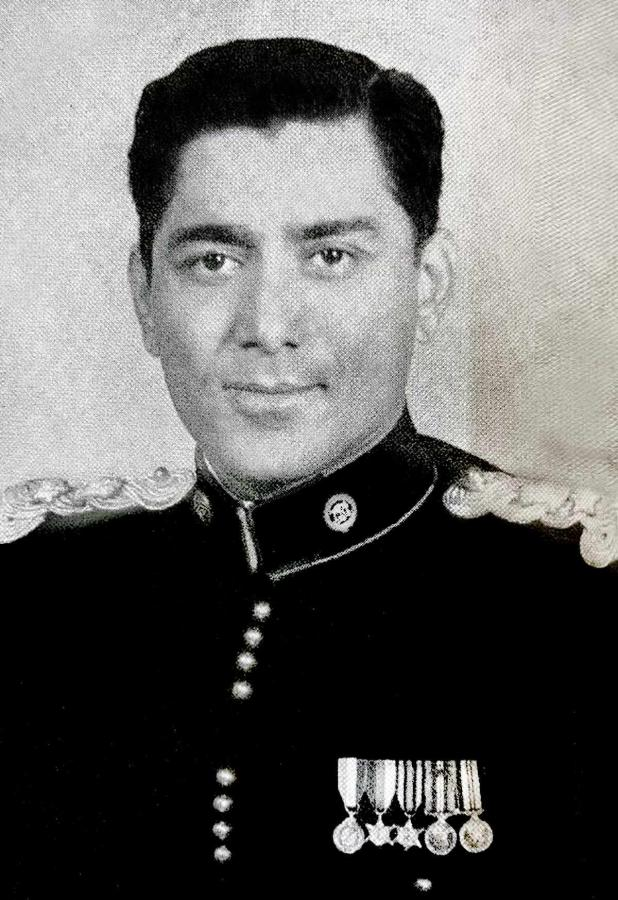
- Born: 3 July 1920; Basra, Iraq
- Died: 28 October 1974 (aged 54); Bombay, India
- Children: Michael Dalvi
- Military career
- Allegiance: India
- Branch: Indian Army
- Service years: 1940–1967
- Rank: Brigadier
- Service number: IC-739
- Unit: Baluch Regiment 5 Gorkha Rifles
- Commands: 7th Infantry Brigade
- Conflicts: World War II; Sino-Indian War; Indo-Pakistani War of 1965
- Awards: Mention in Despatches

Brigadier John Parashuram Dalvi (3 July 1920 – October 1974) was an Indian Army officer. During the Sino-Indian War of 1962, he was the commander of the Indian 7th Brigade, which was destroyed, leading Dalvi to be captured by the People's Liberation Army on 22 October 1962.

== Early life ==
Dalvi was born on 3 July 1920 in Basra, Iraq where his father was serving with the British administration. He returned to India in 1923 and studied at St. Mary's High School, Bombay. He graduated and joined to study under the Jesuits at St. Xavier's College, Bombay. In 1940 with the outbreak of World War II he joined the British Indian Army.

== British Indian Army ==
Dalvi was commissioned into the 10th Baluch Regiment on 22 February 1942, was promoted war-substantive lieutenant on 1 October, and was promoted substantive lieutenant on 22 August 1943. To the end of World War II he served with the regiment's 5th Battalion. He took part in Field Marshal Sir William Slim's pursuit of Japanese Army. From October 1944 to March 1945 he saw fighting with 19th Indian Division notably at the Crossing of the Irrawaddy. For his services he was mentioned in despatches for gallant and distinguished service.

In 1945 he was selected to join the staff of General Sir Montagu Stopford, GOC XXXIII Corps and later GOC-in-C of 12th Army Burma. He ended the war a temporary captain.

== Post-Independence ==
In 1947 he was posted as instructor to Indian Military Academy, Dehradun. He was then moved to 5 Gorkha Rifles as 2nd in command. In 1949 Dalvi was attached with Brigade of the Guards. In 1950, he was selected for Staff College, which he graduated in 1951. He then commanded the 4th Battalion, Brigade of the Guards and later 2nd Guards.

Dalvi was promoted lieutenant-colonel on 13 October 1957. On 2 October 1960 he was promoted acting Brigadier, and appointed Brigadier Administration to XV Corps. In January 1962, he was given the Command of 7th Infantry Brigade in NEFA, with promotion to colonel on 15 March.

== Sino-Indian War and prisoner of war ==
Dalvi fought in the Sino-Indian War, and was taken Prisoner of War on 22 October 1962; held captive by the Chinese for seven months, he was repatriated in May 1963. Left embittered by the failings of the Indian political and military leadership, he described his return to India as follows:

We landed in Dum Dum airport in Calcutta on May 4, 1963. We were received cordially, appropriately. But the silence there was disquieting. I realized later. We had to prove we weren't brainwashed by Chinese ideology. We had to prove we were still loyal to India. My own army maintained a suspicious distance. The irony cannot be harsher: this treatment from a country, which for more than a decade had brainwashed itself into holding the Chinese baton wherever it went.

== Subsequent career ==
Two months after his repatriation, on 9 July 1963 Dalvi was appointed Commander, Poona Sub-Area. He was promoted substantive brigadier on 13 October 1964, with appointment as Commander, Bihar and Orissa Independent Sub-Area on 4 May 1965. With the outbreak of war with Pakistan later that year, he was given command of a brigade on 12 September.

On 29 September 1966, Dalvi was posted to Army HQ as Deputy Director of Staff Duties (DDSD). He took voluntary retirement from the Army on 3 March 1967.

== The Himalayan Blunder ==
In 1968, Dalvi authored a book about the 1962 war, entitled The Himalayan Blunder: The curtain raiser to the Sino-Indian War of 1962. His book directly contradicted that authored by his erstwhile commanding officer, Brij Mohan Kaul. The book is critical of Jawaharlal Nehru.

Brigadier Dalvi served in the Indian Army and gives a first-person account of the war. The book was banned by the Indian Government after its publication.

== Later life ==
Dalvi died of cancer in October 1974.

== Bibliography ==
- Dalvi, Brig. J.P., "Himalayan blunder – the curtain raiser to the Sino-Indian war of 1962" [Bombay, 1969, Rep. Natraj, Dehradun 1997]
- Kaul, Lt. Gen. B.M., "The untold story" [Jaica Publishing House, New Delhi, 1967]
- Maxwell, Neville, "India's China War" [Bombay 1970, Rep. Natraj Dehradun, 1997]
