= Sumdorong Chu =

- Mouth of Sumdorong Chu in Nyamjang Chu Sumdorong Chu (Arunachal Pradesh)
- Native name: གསུམ་རྡོ་རོང་ཆུ (Standard Tibetan)

Location
- Country: China; India
- Region: Shannan, Tibet; Arunachal Pradesh
- District: Tsona County; Tawang district
- City: Lė Township; Zemithang Circle

Physical characteristics
- Source: Eastern Himalayas
  - location: Lė Township
  - coordinates: 27°47′44″N 91°49′18″E
  - elevation: 4,600 m (15,100 ft)
- Mouth: Nyamjang Chu valley
  - coordinates: 27°48′00″N 91°44′42″E
  - elevation: 2,350 m (7,710 ft)

Basin features
- Progression: Nyamjang Chu, Tawang Chu, Manas River
- River system: Brahmaputra

Sumdorong Chu (Tibetan: གསུམ་རྡོ་རོང་ཆུ, Wylie: gsum rdo rong chu; Chinese: 桑多洛河; pinyin: Sāng duō luò hé) is a tributary of the Nyamjang Chu river that flows along the disputed Sino-Indian border between the Tsona County of Tibet and the Tawang district of Arunachal Pradesh. It originates in the Tokpo Shiri Glacier, about 7–10 kilometres east of Nyamjang Chu, and flows down to the river. Its junction with Nyamjang Chu is about two kilometers to the north of that of Namka Chu, another contested river valley.

The Sumdorong Chu Valley was the site of a standoff between India and China in 1986–1987 which, despite giving rise to the fears of another war, deescalated successfully. Subsequently, India and China formulated agreements for managing future border tensions.

== Location ==
Sumdorong Chu flows in a disputed border region between Tibet's Tsona County and Arunachal Pradesh's Tawang district. The dispute arises due to differing interpretations of where the McMahon Line lies.

China adheres to the 1914 map of the McMahon Line, which shows the border as a straight line at 27°44'30" N latitude till the range of "Menlakathong La" (roughly the modern Bum La Pass). India believes that the true border lies along the highest watershed line in the region, which is to the north of the Namka Chu and Sumdorong Chu streams.

== 1987 standoff ==
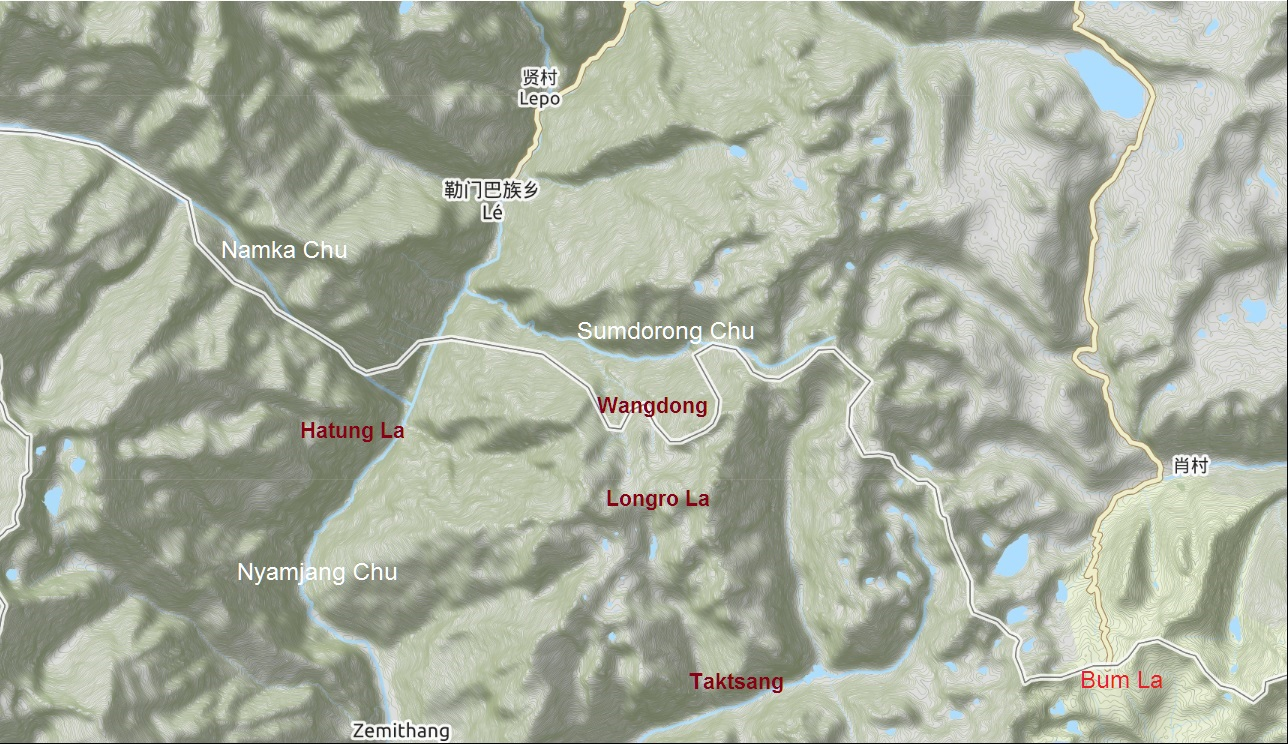
Sumdorong Chu and vicinity

In 1986–87, a military standoff took in the Sumdorong Chu Valley. It was initiated by China moving a company of troops to Wangdung, a pasture to the south of Sumdorong Chu which India held to be part of its territory. The Indian troops stood their ground on the neighbouring Lungro la ridge and both the sides moved a large number of troops to the border. The crisis was diffused after the visit of Indian Foreign Minister to Beijing in May 1987.

== See also ==
- Namka Chu
- McMahon Line

== Bibliography ==
- "China and South Asia (July–September 1986)". China Report. 23 (1): 113–139. February 1987. doi:10.1177/000944558702300111. ISSN 0009-4455. S2CID 220874000.
- Fravel, M. Taylor (2008). Strong Borders, Secure Nation: Cooperation and Conflict in China's Territorial Disputes. Princeton University Press. ISBN 978-1-4008-2887-6.
- Hoffmann, Steven A. (2018) [first published 1990]. India and the China Crisis. University of California Press. ISBN 978-0-520-06537-6.
- Pardesi, Manjeet S. (2020). "Managing the 1986-87 Sino-Indian Sumdorong Chu Crisis". India Review. 18 (5): 534–551. doi:10.1080/14736489.2019.1703364. ISSN 1473-6489. S2CID 213073300.
