= Namka Chu =

River between India and China

Coordinates: 27°46′33″N 91°43′53″E

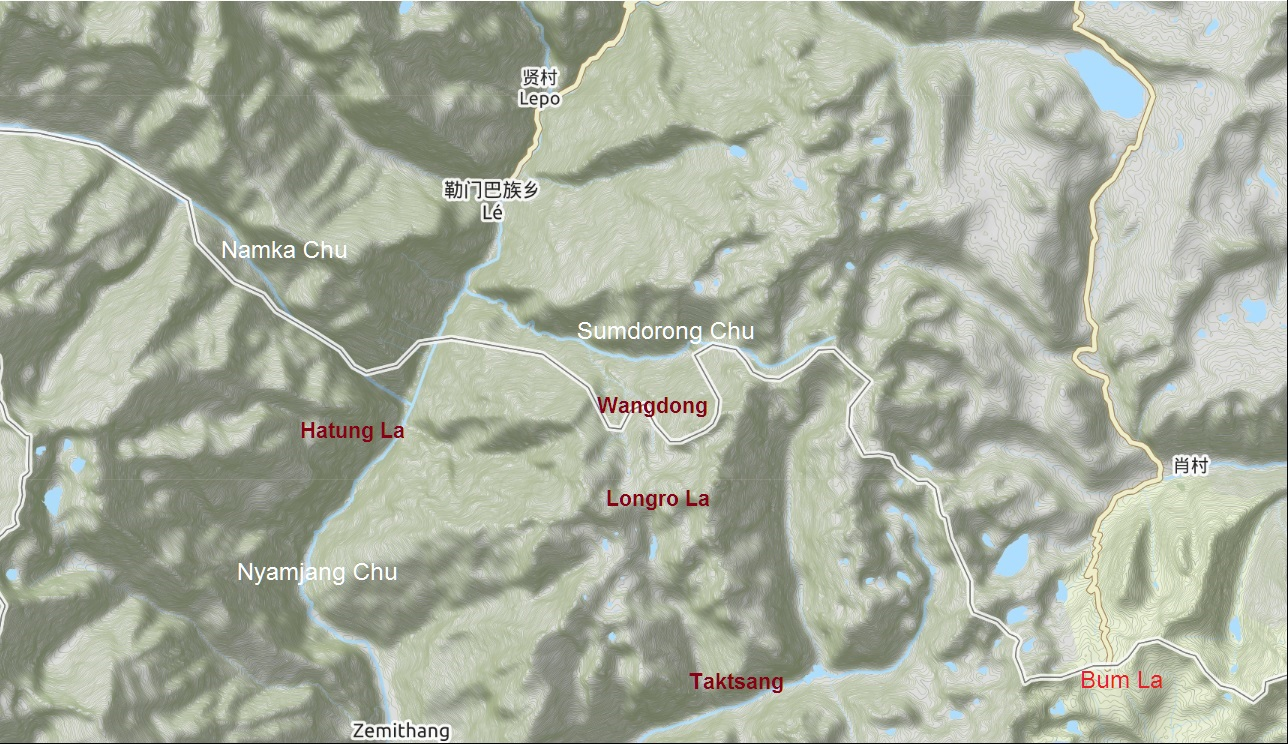
Namka Chu and vicinity

The Namka Chu or Kejielang River (Chinese: 克节朗河; pinyin: Kè jié láng hé) is a tributary of Nyamjang Chu that flows along the disputed border between India and China. The Indian side of the border is the Tawang district in Arunachal Pradesh. The Tibetan side of the border is in Tsona Dzong, Shannan province of Tibet. Namka Chu originates near the trijunction of Tibet, Bhutan and India and flows east for 26 km before joining Nyamjang Chu. It is about 200 kilometers away from the Misamari railhead and 60 kilometers from the Tawang road head. The Namka Chu valley was the scene of some of the most fierce fighting during the 1962 Sino-Indian war.

== Battle of Namka Chu ==
Namka Chu flowing under the India-China border (Note: The Line of Actual Control drawn by the contributors to the OpenStreetMap.)

Namka Chu was the site of a battle during the Sino-Indian War in 1962. The battle of Namka Chu began on 10 October 1962 and continued until 16 November of the same year. The Indian brigade was headed by Brig. John Dalvi.

It concluded with the total destruction of 7 Brigade of the Indian Army and the capture of Dalvi, who was repatriated in 1963. His book The Himalayan Blunder is a detailed analysis of the prelude and conduct of the battle from the Indian point of view. The Indian defeat at the Nam Ka Chu was the first in the India-China border war of 1962, which ended with a unilateral Chinese ceasefire and withdrawal after China had captured almost the entire disputed territory of NEFA (now Arunachal Pradesh). India permanently lost the control of Dhola Post and Khinzemane Post to China, later India built the New Khinzemane Post to the south.

== See also ==
- Sumdorong Chu
- McMahon Line
