= Koyla =

1997 Indian film by Rakesh Roshan

- Poster
- Directed by: Rakesh Roshan
- Screenplay by: Ravi Kapoor; Sachin Bhowmick
- Dialogues by: Anwar Khan
- Story by: Rakesh Roshan
- Produced by: Rakesh Roshan
- Starring: Shah Rukh Khan; Madhuri Dixit; Amrish Puri
- Cinematography: Sameer Arya
- Edited by: Sanjay Verma
- Music by: Rajesh Roshan
- Production company: Filmkraft Productions Pvt. Ltd.
- Distributed by: Yash Raj Films; Sony Pictures
- Release date: 18 April 1997 (India)
- Running time: 167 minutes
- Country: India
- Language: Hindi
- Budget: est. ₹12 crore
- Box office: est. ₹28.05 crore

Koyla (transl. Coal) is a 1997 Indian Hindi-language action drama film directed, co-written and produced by Rakesh Roshan. The film stars Shah Rukh Khan, Madhuri Dixit and Amrish Puri in lead roles with Johnny Lever, Ashok Saraf, Salim Ghouse, Deepshikha Nagpal, and Himani Shivpuri in supporting roles. Mohnish Bahl makes a special appearance.

The film was released worldwide on 18 April 1997 and was declared an average grosser at the box-office, earning over ₹28.05 crore worldwide against a budget of ₹12 crore. Koyla emerged as the 8th highest-grosing film of 1997 in India.

== Plot ==
Shankar, a handsome and kind hearted young man who is also mute, has been raised by the powerful Raja, to whom he is loyal, since the death of his parents when he was a child. Raja treats him like a slave, though. Raja's brother Brijwa, a violent psychopath habitually beats Shankar.

A ruthless man with a large appetite for young women, Raja kills anyone who dares to defy him. When Raja sees Gauri, a pretty and innocent villager, he decides to marry her and sends her a photo of Shankar so that Gauri will agree to marry.

During the wedding ceremony, Gauri discovers that Shankar isn't her groom and faints. Raja however orders the priest to continue. When she regains consciousness, Gauri is shocked to see Raja trying to consummate their marriage. When she resists, Raja imprisons her and tortures her.

Gauri tries to commit suicide, but Shankar saves her. She accuses him of ruining her life, but soon realizes he is innocent. When Gauri's brother Ashok visits them, Raja forces Gauri to lie that she is happy.

Shankar reveals the truth to Ashok by writing in the dirt that Raja and Brijwa kill Ashok when he tries to rescue his sister. Ashok makes Shankar promise that he will save Gauri and dies. Gauri and Shankar flee Raja's mansion. Enraged, Raja sets a search in motion with the help of a corrupt DIG. After a long chase through the jungle and mountains, Shankar kills Raja's men. Gauri and Shankar begin to fall in love. Raja captures them by shooting Gauri in the arm. Shankar is brutally beaten by Brijwa and the corrupt DIG, and Raja slits his throat, leaving him to die in the mountains.

Gauri is sold to a brothel after Raja discovers she loves Shankar. There, Bindiya, Raja's former lover, who was disowned by him after she too fell for Shankar, saves Gauri. Brijwa, at his brother's orders, humiliates Bindiya in public and stabs her.

Shankar is saved by a village boy who brings him to his grandfather (a healer), who operates on his throat while he is still unconscious. The healer, who discovers that Shankar is not mute by birth, is able to repair some of the damaged nerves in Shankar's throat, enabling him to speak. While recovering, Shankar recalls that when he was a boy, his father discovered diamonds in the coal mine, and then his parents were murdered by two mysterious men. When young Shankar threatened to tell the news to family friends, someone shoved hot coals into his throat, rendering him mute.

Shankar returns to the mansion and kills Brijwa. He rescues Gauri from the same men who had killed his parents, killing one of them in the process. Shankar discovers that Raja was responsible for making him mute and ordering his parents to be killed so he could steal their wealth. He reunites with Raja's doctor and son and, with their help, kills Raja's henchman and reveals Raja's crimes to the coal miners.

Gauri arrives with her uncle and aunt, forcing them to admit their involvement in making her marry Raja. Raja's doctor and his son turn against him, revealing that he not only deceived Gauri, but is also responsible for numerous killings and rapes. Chaos follows among the mine workers when the DIG throws grenades at them only to be stopped by Shankar who later chases after and corners Raja, who begs for his life, pointing out that he raised Shankar but Shankar disregards this by saying it was to make him a slave. After dodging a pickaxe thrown at him, Shankar kills Raja by spilling oil and coal around him and setting him on fire with a burning rock. Shankar and Gauri embrace each other.

== Cast ==
- Shah Rukh Khan as Shankar
- Madhuri Dixit as Gauri
- Amrish Puri as Raja Saab
- Salim Ghouse as Brijwa Chaudhry
- Johnny Lever as Chhote
- Ashok Saraf as Ved "Vedji" Narayan
- Deepshikha Nagpal as Bindiya
- Jack Gaud as Ranbir Chauhan
- Ranjeet as Dilawar Bapat
- Mohnish Behl as Ashok Singh, Gauri's brother (special appearance)
- Himani Shivpuri as Chanda Bai
- Suresh Chatwal as Sanjay Singh
- Shubha Khote as Sumitra Singh
- Razak Khan as Anand Godbole
- Kunickaa Sadanand as Rasili
- Vikas Anand as Hariya Thakur
- Pradeep Rawat as Police Commissioner Kashinath
- Dev Malhotra
- Rammohan Sharma

== Production ==
=== Development ===
Rakesh Roshan got the idea of making Koyla when he was shooting for his other directorial venture Karobaar: The Business of Love in 1992, which got delayed and was finally released in 2000. Koyla tells the story of a simple-hearted village girl who falls in love with her torturing husband's mute servant, who then takes revenge against his boss. The film was also Rakesh Roshan's first film to feature DTS 5.1 surround sound.

=== Filming ===
Principal photography of Koyla began in June 1996. A song of the film, Tanhai Tanhai, and some of the scenes, were shot at the Nuranang Falls (the Jang Falls) & Sela Lake near Jang Town north of Sela Tunnel/Sela Pass in Tawang district of Arunachal Pradesh. Other scenes were also filmed in Hyderabad and south areas of Ooty.

During the shooting of the film's one of the popular songs, Ghungte Mein Chanda, Khan fractured his leg. The other song of the film, Dekha Tujhe Toh, was to be therefore exited from the film because of his fracture, but after Khan's leg got fully well, the song was shot. The sound of real pots was used for the background music of Dekha Tujhe Toh.

== Soundtrack ==
Koyla

Soundtrack album by Rajesh Roshan
- Released: 1997
- Genre: Feature film soundtrack
- Length: 42:40
- Label: Tips Music

The soundtrack was very popular, especially tracks "Dekha Tujhe Toh" and "Ghoongte Mein Chanda". According to the Indian trade website Box Office India, with around 18,00,000 units sold, the soundtrack became the thirteenth highest-selling album of the year.

#	Title	Singer(s)	Length
1.	"Dekha Tujhe Toh"	Kumar Sanu, Alka Yagnik	07:32
2.	"Ghoongte Mein Chanda"	Udit Narayan	06:17
3.	"Badan Juda Hote"	Kumar Sanu, Preeti Singh	10:30
4.	"Saanson Ki Mala"	Kavita Krishnamurthy	06:47
5.	"Tanhai Tanhai"	Udit Narayan, Alka Yagnik	05:35
6.	"Bhang Ke Nashe"	Alka Yagnik	06:07

== Box office ==
Koyla grossed ₹25.91 crore (US$2.7 million) in India and $600,000 (₹2.14 crore) in other countries, for a worldwide total of ₹28.05 crore (US$2.9 million), against its ₹12 crore (US$1.2 million) budget. It had a worldwide opening weekend of ₹5.39 crore (US$560,000), and grossed ₹9.60 crore (US$1.0 million) in its first week. It is the 9th-highest-grossing Bollywood film of 1997 worldwide.

=== India ===
It opened on Friday, 18 April 1997, across 275 screens, and had a record opening of ₹15 crore (US$1.6 million) nett. The film shared the record for the highest opening day with the previous record opener Trimurti which also grossed ₹1.06 crore (US$110,000) nett on its opening day. It went on to break ₹3.07 crore (US$320,000) nett opening weekend record set by Trimurti, and recorded the highest ever opening weekend of ₹3.10 crore (US$320,000) nett. It had a first week of ₹5.52 crore (US$570,000) nett. The film earned a total of ₹14.88 crore (US$1.5 million) nett.

=== Overseas ===
It earned $600,000 (₹2.14 crore) outside India.

== Awards and nominations ==
- Filmfare Award for Best Performance in a Negative Role - Amrish Puri - Nominated
