= Jang Town =

Town in Tawang district, Arunachal Pradesh, India

Jang
- Town
- Location in Arunachal Pradesh, India Jang (India)
- Coordinates: 27.58337°N 91.98020°E
- Country: India
- State: Arunachal Pradesh
- District: Tawang district

Area
  - Total: 191 km^{2} (74 sq mi)
- Elevation: 2,905 m (9,531 ft)

Population (2011)
  - Total: 5,480
  - Density: 28.7/km^{2} (74.3/sq mi)

Languages
  - Official: English
- Time zone: UTC+5:30 (IST)
- PIN: 790105
- Area code: 03794
- Vehicle registration: AR
- Census code: 264533
- Website: tawang.nic.in

Jang is a tourist destination, town and subdivision in Jang Valley in Tawang district of Arunachal Pradesh state of India. It lies on NH-13 Trans-Arunachal Highway 40 km southwest of Tawang and north of Sela Tunnel/Sela Pass. As per the 2011 Census of India, Jang has a population of 5,480. Jang Hydal Plant, near the base of Nuranang Falls (Jang Falls), is a small hydel plant which generates electricity for local use.

== Demography ==
Jang subdivision has a total of 8 villages. Below is the list of villages under the Jang subdivision:

Villages	Population 2011
Thongsheng	127
Marmang	497
Kharsa	691
Namazing	664
Dungse	1,770
Yuthumbu	1,363
Nuranang RA III	368

== Tourist place ==
The Nuranang Falls or the Jang Falls, famous for Koyla movie's song shooting and Jaswant Garh War Memorial commemorating MVC (posthumous) Jaswant Singh Rawat's fearless fight unto death during Battle of Nooranang in Sino-Indian war in 1962, driving 40 Km from Tawang.

== See also ==
- Sela Tunnel
