= Lumla =

Village in Arunachal Pradesh, India

Coordinates: 27.529°N 91.713°E

Lumla is a town and the headquarters of an eponymous circle in the Tawang district in Arunachal Pradesh, India. Lumla is at the southwestern corner of the Tawang district close to its border with Bhutan. Lumla is also the headquarters of a subdivision of the Tawang district and the centre of a Legislative Assembly constituency. The current member of the legislative assembly (MLA) from Lumla is Tsering Lhamu.

== Transport ==
Once completed the Bhalukpong-Tawang railway, is planned to be further extended by a 100 km long western spur to Yongphulla Airport in Bhutan (upgraded by India and jointly used by the Indian Army and Bhutan Army) in eastern Bhutan via Yabab in India and Trashigang in Bhutan.

In July 2020, BRO was tasked with building new strategic roads to connect eastern Bhutan to western Tawang area such as "Lumla-Trashigang road" through Sakteng Wildlife Sanctuary.

Nearest airport is Tawang Air Force Station with helicopter connectivity under UDAN scheme.

== See also ==
- Sela Pass
- Sela Tunnel
- Arunachal Frontier Highway
- India-China Border Roads
