= Nuranang Falls =

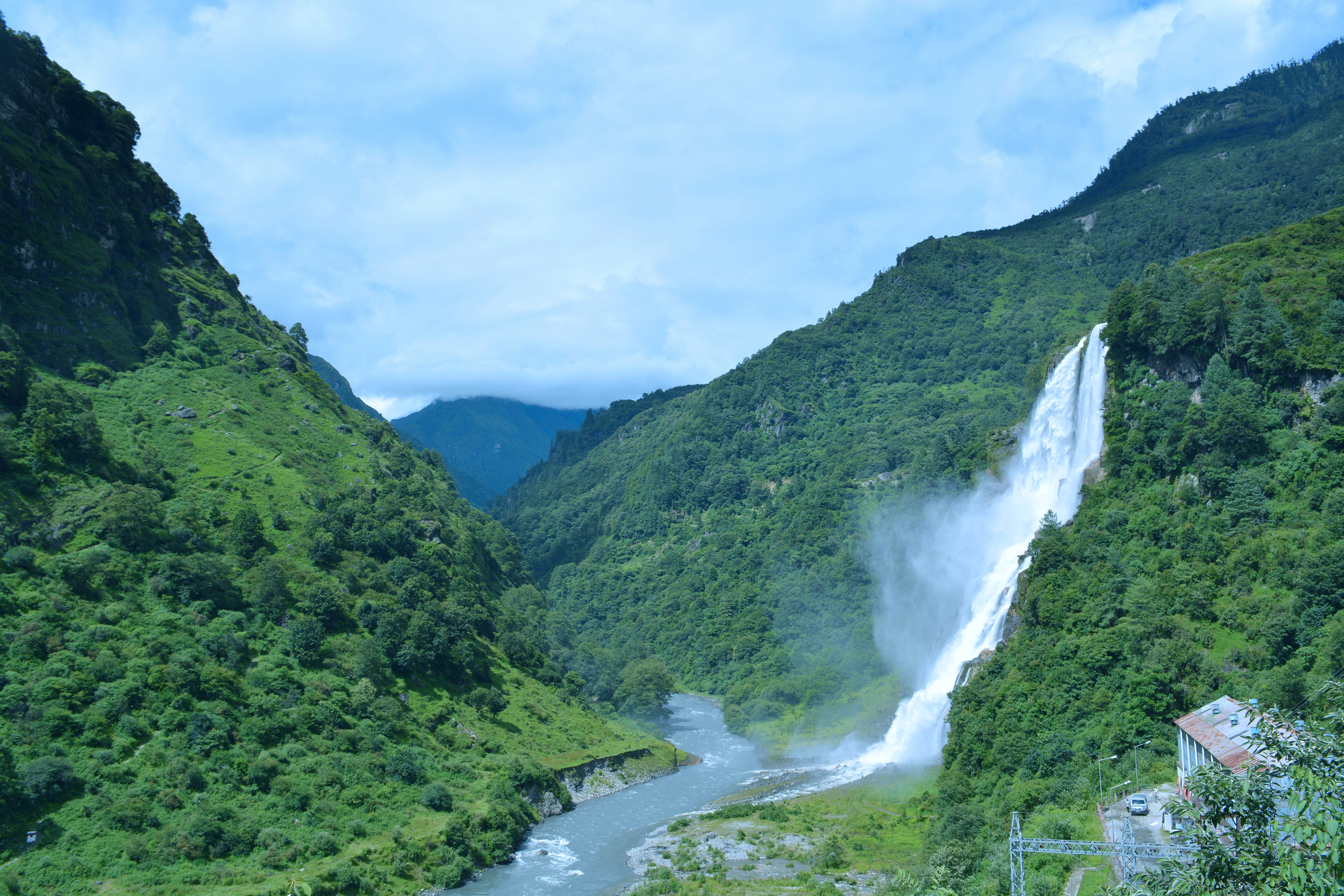
- Nuranang Falls
- Interactive map of Nuranang Falls
- Location: Tawang, Arunachal Pradesh, India
- Coordinates: 27°35′22″N 91°59′03″E
- Type: curtain
- Total height: 100 m (330 ft)
- Number of drops: 2
- Watercourse: Nuranang Chu

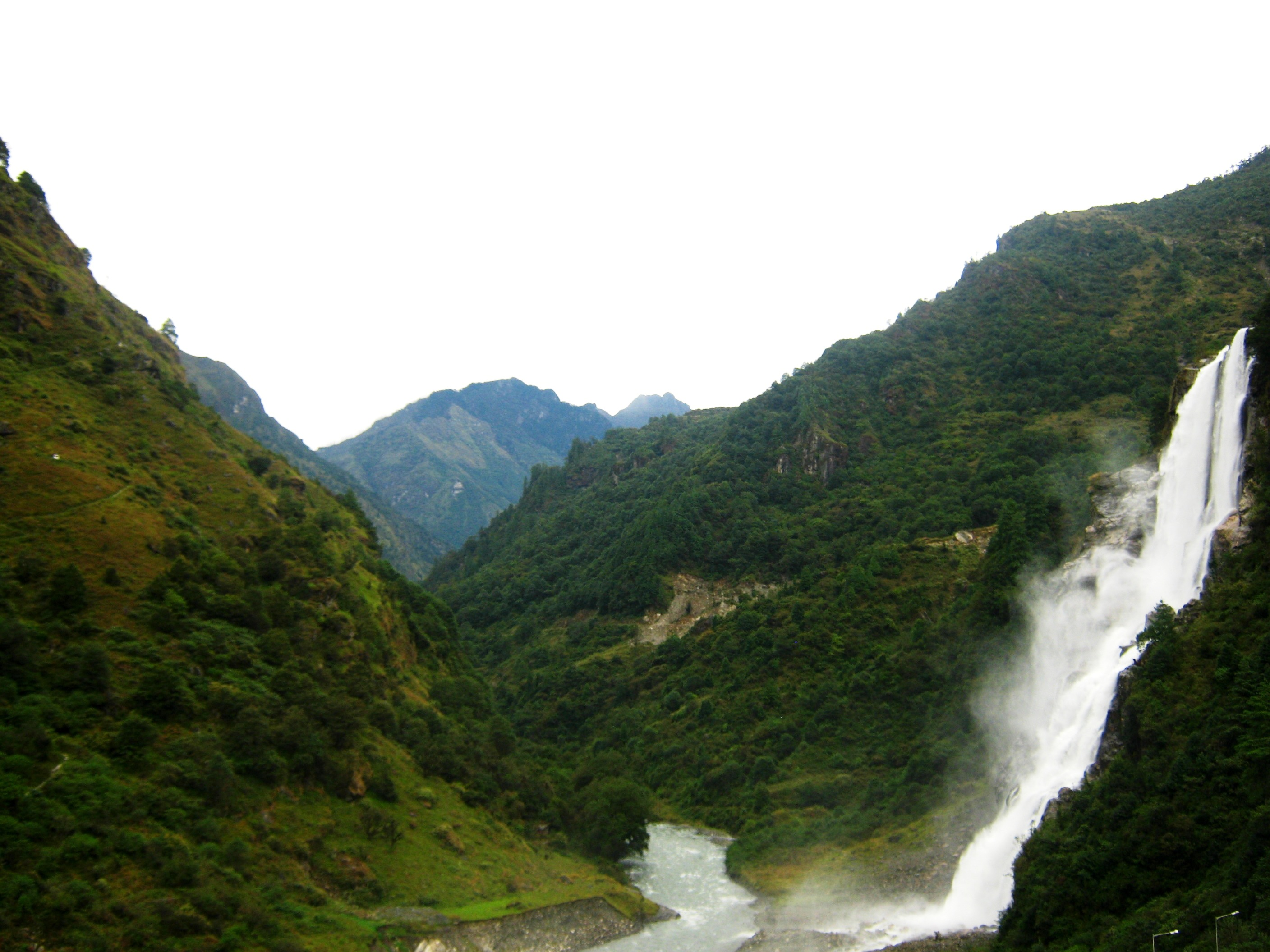
Nuranang Falls

Nuranang Falls (also known as Jung Falls & Bong Bong Falls ), 100 m high waterfall, is located 2 km northeast of the Jung town on the motorable Jung Falls Road in the Tawang district of Arunachal Pradesh state of India. jung is 40 km southeast of Tawang, north of Sela Tunnel, and between Tawang and Bomdila on NH-13 Trans-Arunachal Highway. jung Hydal Plant, near the base of fall, is a small hydel plant which generates electricity for local use.

The Nuranang river originates from the Northern slopes of the Sela Pass. Shortly after the waterfall it confluences with the Tawang river.

== In popular culture ==
Nuranang came to the limelight when a song from the movie Koyla featuring Bollywood actor Shahrukh Khan and actress Madhuri Dixit, Tanhai Tanhai Tanhai was shot here and at Sangetser Lake in 1997. It was the first film shot from the state shown in a Bollywood movie.

A second song named Mitha Mitha from the film Hiya Diya Niya released in 2000 was also shot here.

== See also ==
- List of waterfalls
- List of waterfalls in India
- Battle of Nuranang
- Jaswant Garh War Memorial
- Sela Pass
