= Tawang Air Force Station =

- IATA: none; ICAO: VETW

Summary
- Airport type: Military
- Operator: Indian Air Force
- Location: Tawang, Arunachal Pradesh, India
- Elevation AMSL: 8,756 ft / 2,669 m
- Coordinates: 27°35′19″N 91°52′40″E

Map

Tawang Air Force station in Arunachal Pradesh in India has a functional heliport and fixed-wing "Advanced Landing Ground" (AGL) capable of handling Lockheed Martin C-130J Super Hercules transport aircraft. The Indian Air Force (IAF) has since 2016 upgraded 8 ALG in Arunachal Pradesh and made those operation by 2018, all of which has been offered for the operation of civil helicopter and flights for tourism and the UDAN scheme.

== History ==
Tawang AFS was established by the Government of India due to the border security needs of the country from the northeastern side, where different states, especially Arunachal Pradesh, share their borders with China. With its status as a heliport, this airport also plays a pivotal role in maintaining the system for security training and monitoring. Radar was installed here in 2010-11.

The Indian Army started to upgrade the Tawang AFS with a runway for the fixed wing aircraft capable of allowing the landing of large and heavy transport aircraft including newly acquired C-130J Super Hercules.

== Northeast connectivity ==
=== Nearby civil airports ===
Nearby airports Lokpriya Gopinath Bordoloi International Airport at Guwahati and Salonibari Airport at Tezpur are located at a distance of 450 and 325 kilometers, respectively.

As of November 2018, helicopter air connectivity under the UDAN Scheme was operational from the AGLs and heliports at Pasighat, Aalo, Itanagar, Tuting, Walong, Yingkiong, and Ziro.

=== Annual connectivity summit ===
The "North East Connectivity Summit" is held annually for the development of rail, road, air and tourist connectivity of the Northeast India.

== See also ==
Tawang related

- Bhalukpong-Tawang railway
- Sela Tunnel
- Bum La Pass
- List of airports in Arunachal Pradesh
- List of airports in India

Military bases

- List of ALGs
- List of Indian Air Force stations
- India-China military deployment on LAC
- List of disputed India-China areas
- Tianwendian
- Ukdungle

Borders

- Line of Actual Control (LAC)
- Borders of China
- Borders of India

Conflicts

- Sino-Indian conflict
- List of disputed territories of China
- List of disputed territories of India

Other related topics

- India-China Border Roads
- List of extreme points of India
- Defence Institute of High Altitude Research
- Independent Golden Jubilee Government Higher Secondary School, Pasighat
