= Jaswant Singh Rawat =

Indian army soldier (1941–1962)

Rifleman Jaswant Singh Rawat MVC
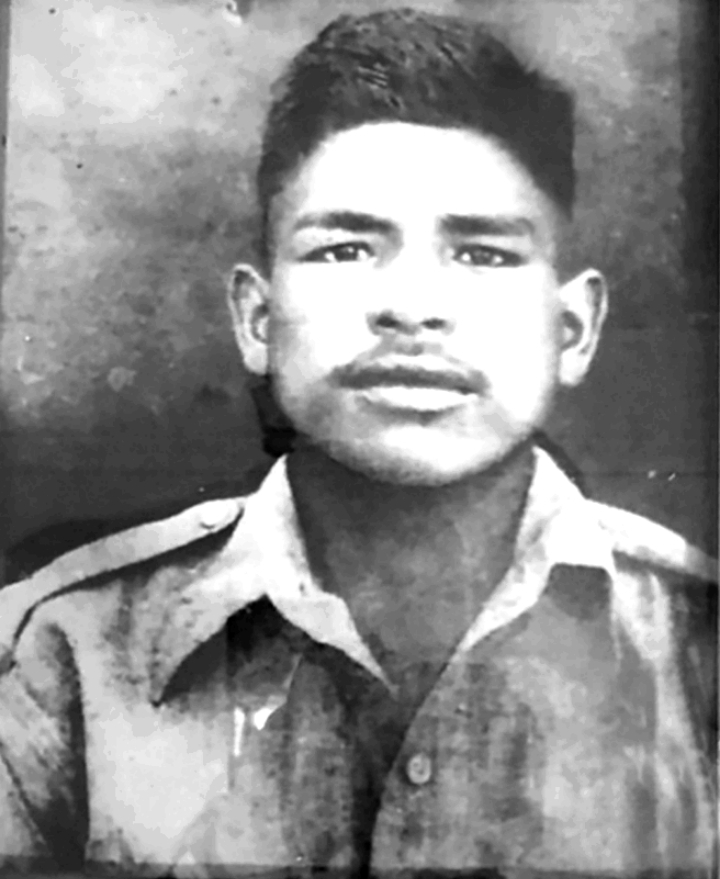
- Rifleman Jaswant Singh Rawat
- Born: 19 August 1941; Dhumakot, Pauri Garhwal, British India
- Died: 17 November 1962 (aged 21); Nuranang, North-East Frontier Agency, India (present-day Arunachal Pradesh, India)
- Military career
- Allegiance: India
- Branch: Indian Army
- Service years: 1961–62
- Rank: Captain (Honorary)
- Unit: 4th Garhwal Rifles
- Conflicts: Sino-Indian War †
- Awards: Maha Vir Chakra

Rifleman Jaswant Singh Rawat, MVC (19 August 1941– 17 November 1962) was an Indian soldier and posthumous recipient of the prestigious Maha Vir Chakra of which he was awarded for his actions of valor during the Battle of Nuranang in the Sino-Indian War.

== Sino-Indian War: Battle of Nuranang ==
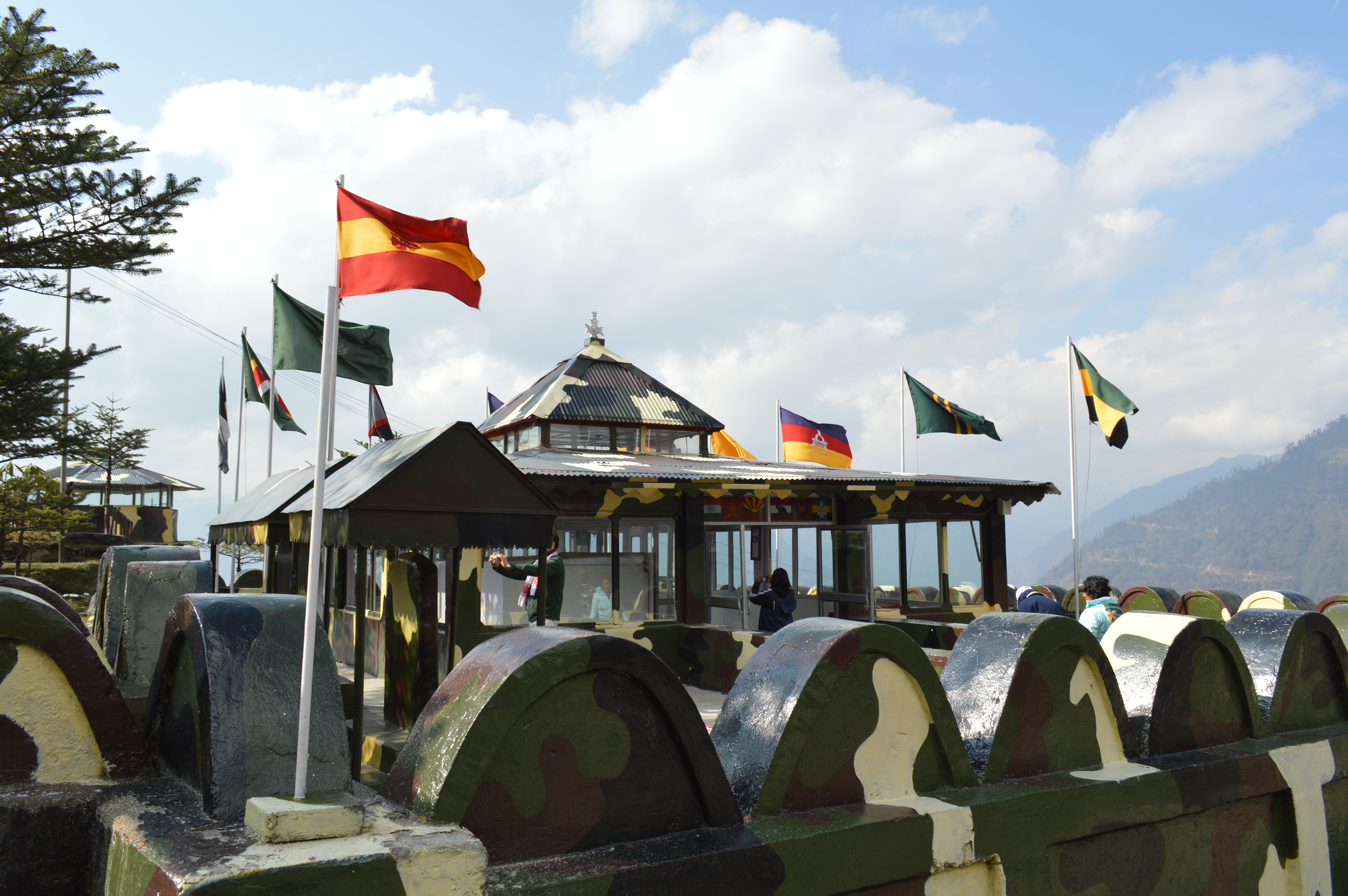
Jaswant Garh War Memorial, Jaswantgarh, Arunachal Pradesh.

During the Battle of Nuranang on 17 November 1962 in the North-East Frontier Agency (now Arunachal Pradesh), Rawat was serving in the 4th battalion of 4th Garhwal Rifles regiment. On that day, the 4th Garhwal Rifles had beaten back two People's Liberation Army charges on their position. During a third intrusion, a Chinese medium machine gun (MMG) had come close to the Indian defenses and was firing accurately at their positions. Rawat, along with Lance Naik Trilok Singh Negi and Rifleman Gopal Singh Gusain volunteered to subdue the MMG. Rawat and Gusain, aided by covering fire from Negi closed within a grenade-throwing distance of the machine gun position and neutralized the Chinese detachment of five sentries, seizing the MMG in the process. However, while returning, Gusain and Negi lost their lives and Rawat was seriously injured, although he managed to return with the captured weapon. The battle resulted in 300 Chinese casualties, whereas the 4th Garhwal Rifles lost two men and had eight wounded.

Rawat's company eventually decided to fall back, but Rawat remained and kept up the fight with the help of two local Monpa girls named Sela and Nura (Noora). Later, Sela was killed and Noora captured. Rushing from position to position, Rawat held off the enemy for 72 hours until the Chinese captured a local supplier, who told them that they were facing only one fighter. The Chinese then stormed Rawat's position, but the exact details of his death are unclear. Some accounts claim that Rawat shot himself with his last round of ammunition; others state that he was taken prisoner and executed by the Chinese. The Chinese commander returned Rawat's severed head and a brass bust of him to India after the war was over. Sela Pass, Sela Tunnel and Sela Lake were named after Sela in commemoration of her actions.

== Legacy: Jaswant Garh memorial and post ==
Rawat's bravery was honored by naming the army post held by him as the "Jaswant Garh post" where he fended off the People's Liberation Army, and the Jaswant Garh War Memorial was built at the post. Memorial at the army post lies 52 km southeast of Tawang & north of Sela Tunnel on NH-13 Trans-Arunachal Highway's Dirang-Tawang section.

Additionally, Rawat has received several posthumous promotions.

Sela, who died helping Jaswant was honored by naming the Sela Pass, Sela Tunnel and Sela Lake in her name. Nuranang Falls was named after Nura.

4th Garhwal Rifles was later awarded the Battle Honour Nuranang, the only battle honor awarded to an army unit during the ongoing war.

== In popular culture ==
The 2019 Hindi movie 72 Hours: Martyr Who Never Died, directed by Avinash Dhyani, is based on the story of Rifleman Jaswant Singh Rawat.

== See also ==
- Sela Tunnel, Sela Pass and Sela lake named after Sela
