= Dirang =

- Town
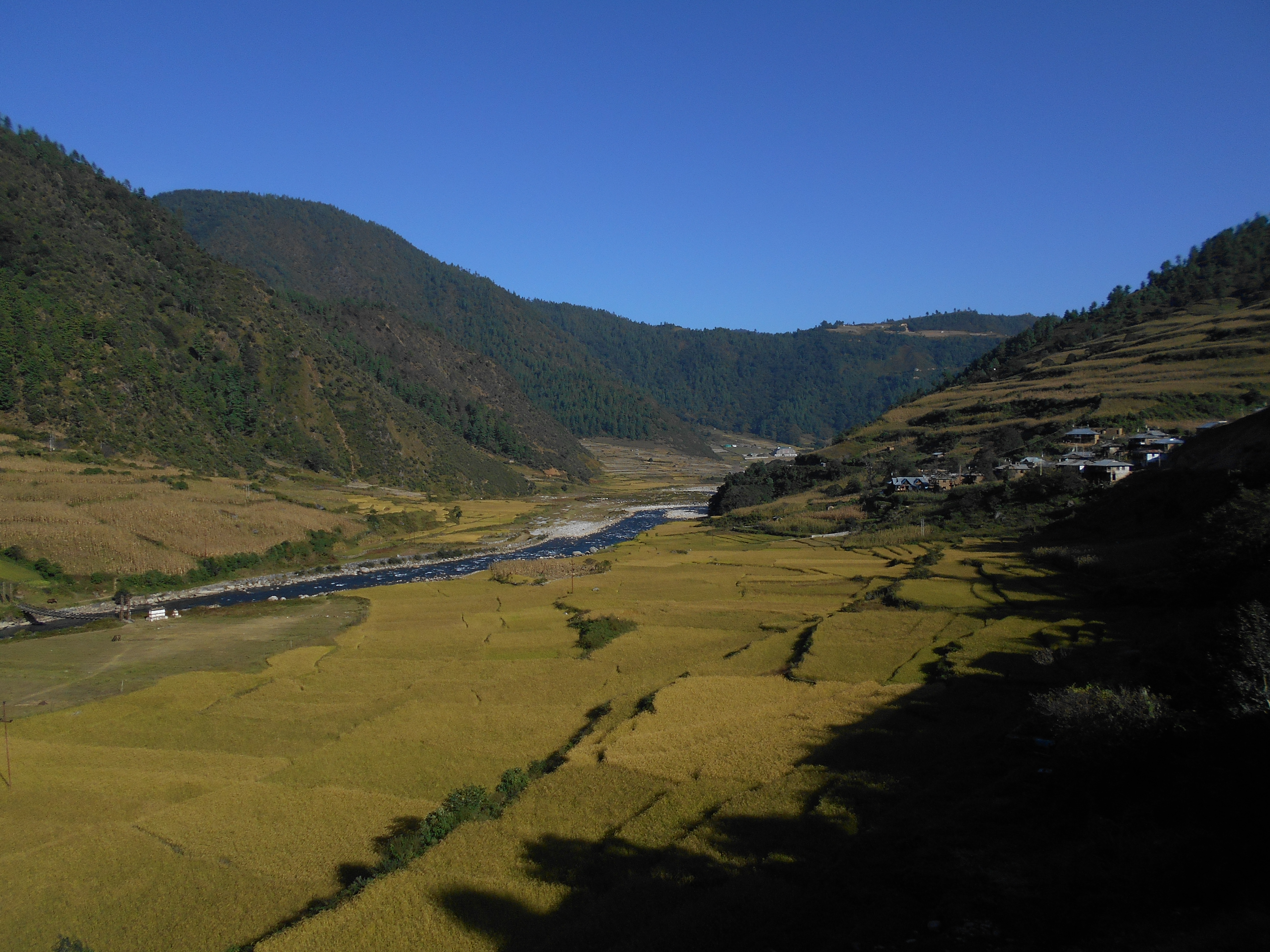
- Dirang Valley

- Location in Arunachal Pradesh, India Dirang (India)
- Coordinates: 27°21′44″N 92°14′27″E
- Country: India
- State: Arunachal Pradesh
- District: West Kameng
- Elevation: 1,620 m (5,310 ft)
- Time zone: UTC+5:30 (IST)
- Vidhan Sabha constituency: Dirang

Dirang or simply Dirang H.Q. is a town on NH-13 in the district of West Kameng in the Indian state of Arunachal Pradesh. The National Institute of Mountaineering and Adventure Sports (NIMAS) is located here. It is the location of a major geothermal power project and is proposed to become the first geothermal powered town in India.

== Administration ==
Dirang is one of the 60 constituencies of Legislative Assembly of Arunachal Pradesh. As of August 2019, Phurpa Tsering was the MLA of Dirang.

== Geothermal power station ==
In November 2025, Arunachal's Centre for Earth Sciences & Himalayan Studies Itanagar (CESH), Norwegian Geotechnical Institute, Iceland's company Geotropy eh and Guwahati Boring Service began pumping test for establishment of Arunachal's first geothermal renewable energy production well at Dirang with the long term goal of establishing Dirang as India's first geothermal-powered town.

== Tourism ==
Nyukmadong War Memorial on NH-13, commemorating the sacrifice of Indian soldiers led by Brigadier Hoshiar Singh on 18 November 1962 during the Battle of Nyukmadung, lies 21 km north of Dirang between Dirang and Sela Tunnel/Sela Pass. There are several Buddhist monasteries in and around Dirang.

== See also ==
- List of constituencies of Arunachal Pradesh Legislative Assembly
- Arunachal Pradesh Legislative Assembly
