= Sela Pass =

Mountain pass in Arunachal Pradesh, India

- Se La
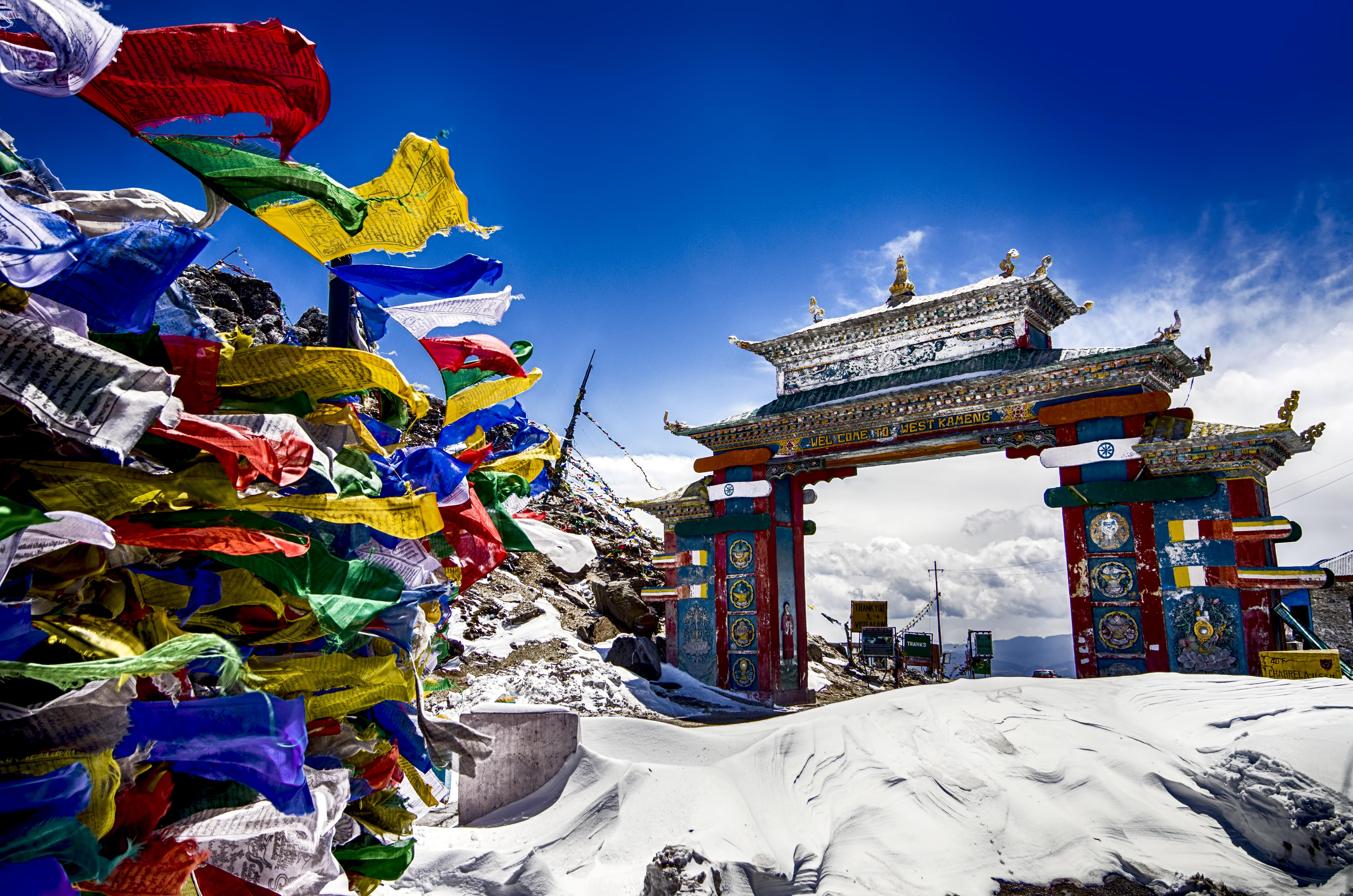
- Sela Pass gate in April 2015

- Location within Arunachal Pradesh Location within India
- Elevation: 4,170 metres (13,680 ft)

Third Approach
- Location: Arunachal Pradesh, India
- Range: Himalaya
- Coordinates: 27°30′17″N 92°06′17″E

The Sela Pass (Tibetan: གཟེ་ལ།) (more appropriately called Se La, as La means Pass in Tibetan language) is a high-altitude mountain pass located on the border between the Tawang and West Kameng districts in the Indian state of Arunachal Pradesh. It has an elevation of 4170 m (13,700 ft) and connects the Indian Buddhist town of Tawang to Dirang and Guwahati. The pass carries the National Highway 13 (previously NH 229), connecting Tawang with the rest of India. The pass supports scarce amounts of vegetation and is usually snow-covered to some extent throughout the year. Sela Lake, near the summit of the pass, is one of approximately 101 lakes in the area that are sacred in Tibetan Buddhism. While Sela Pass does get heavy snowfall in winters, it is usually open throughout the year unless landslides or snow require the pass to be shut down temporarily. Sela pass is one of the highest motorable mountain passes in the world

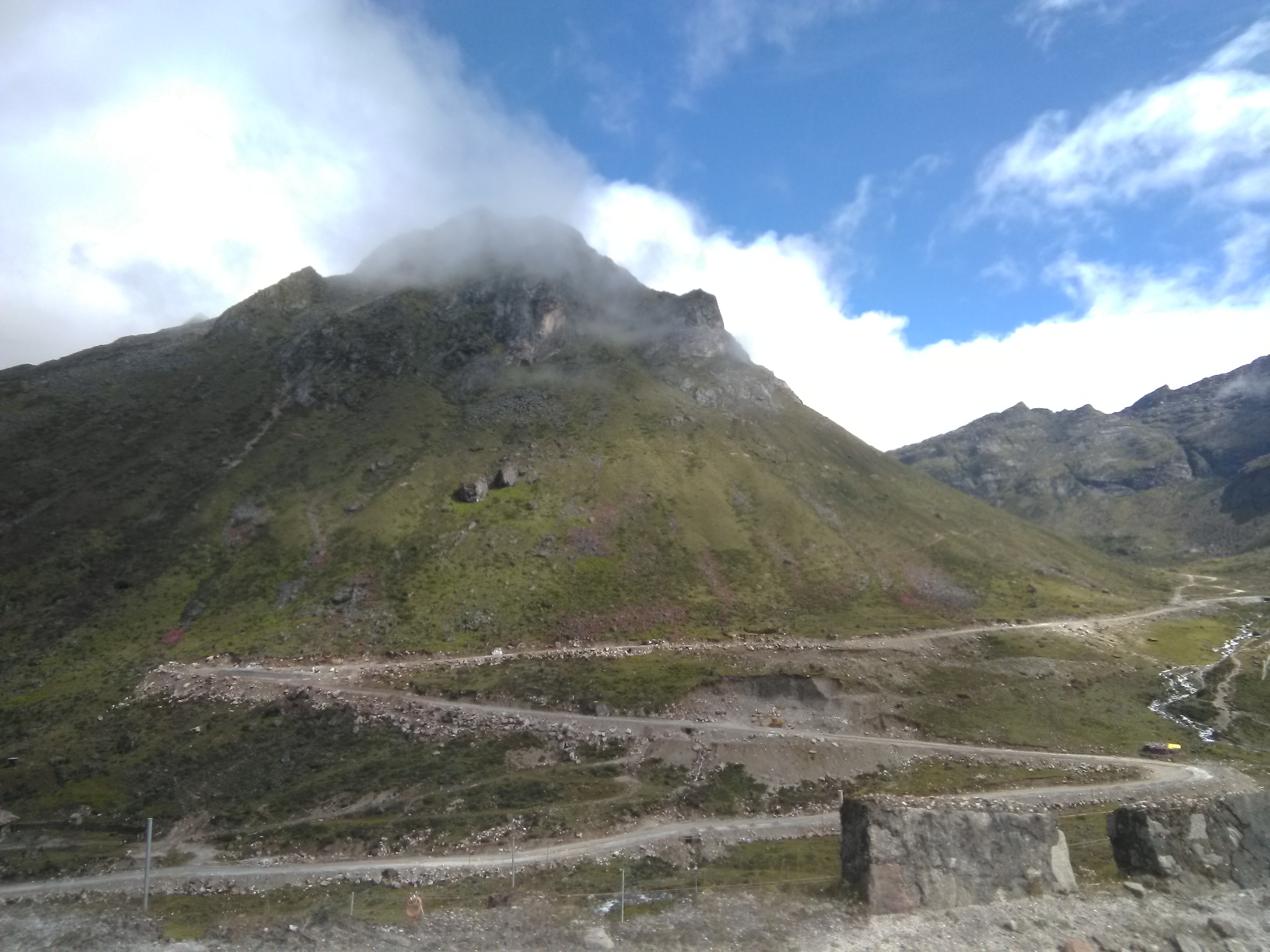
Sela Pass in August, 2018

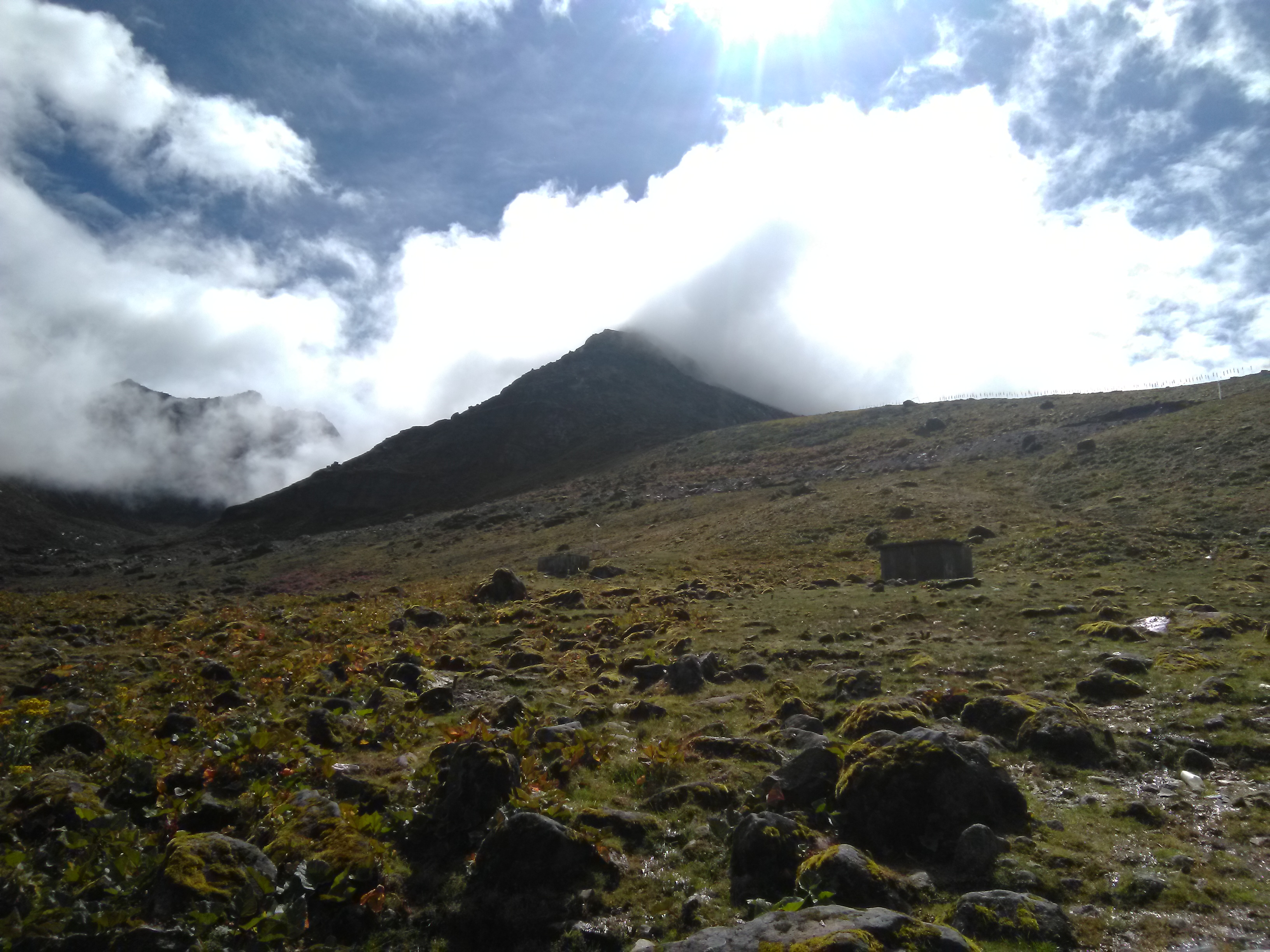
Zomdong Na Village - In the middle of Sela Pass

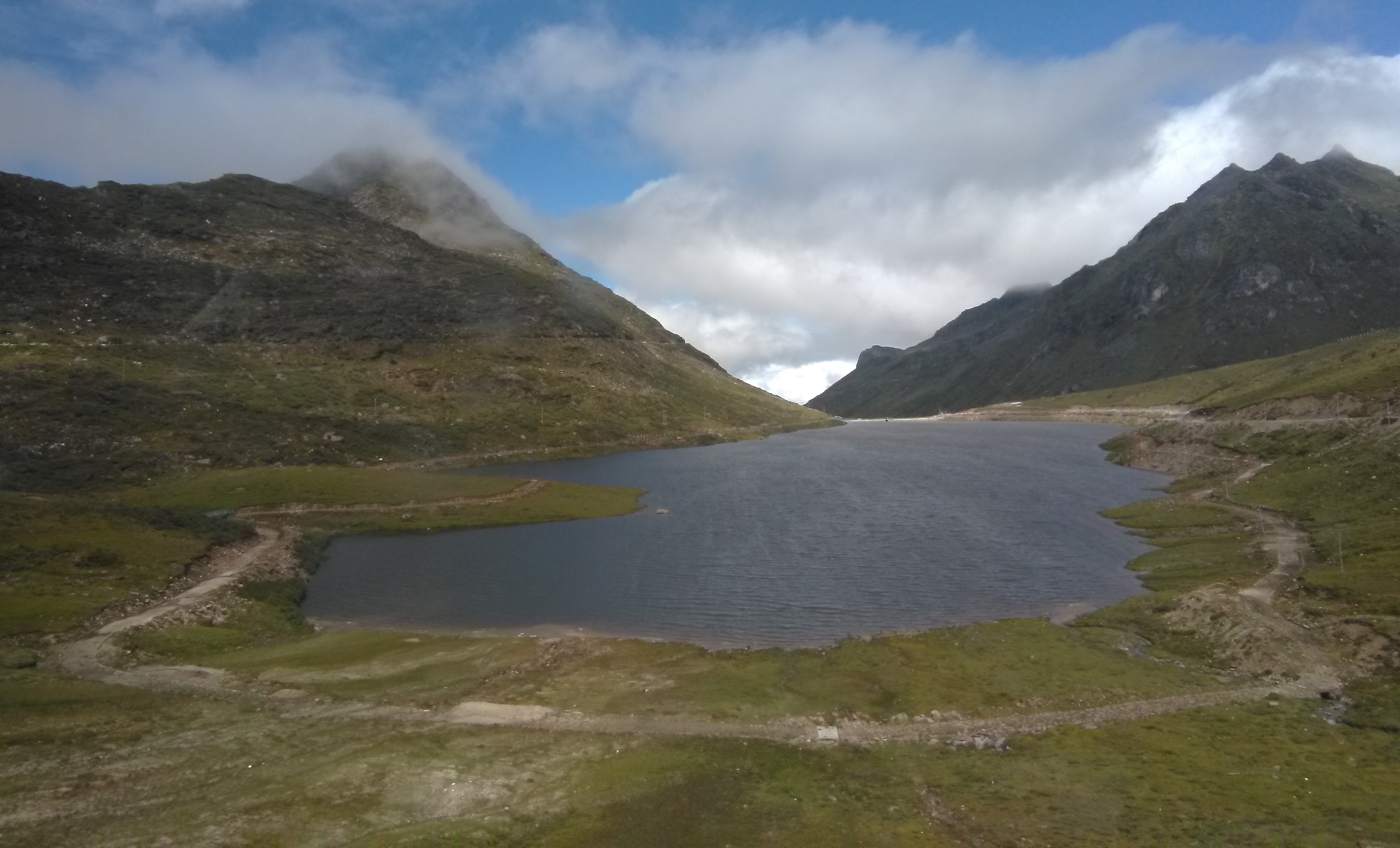
Sela Lake

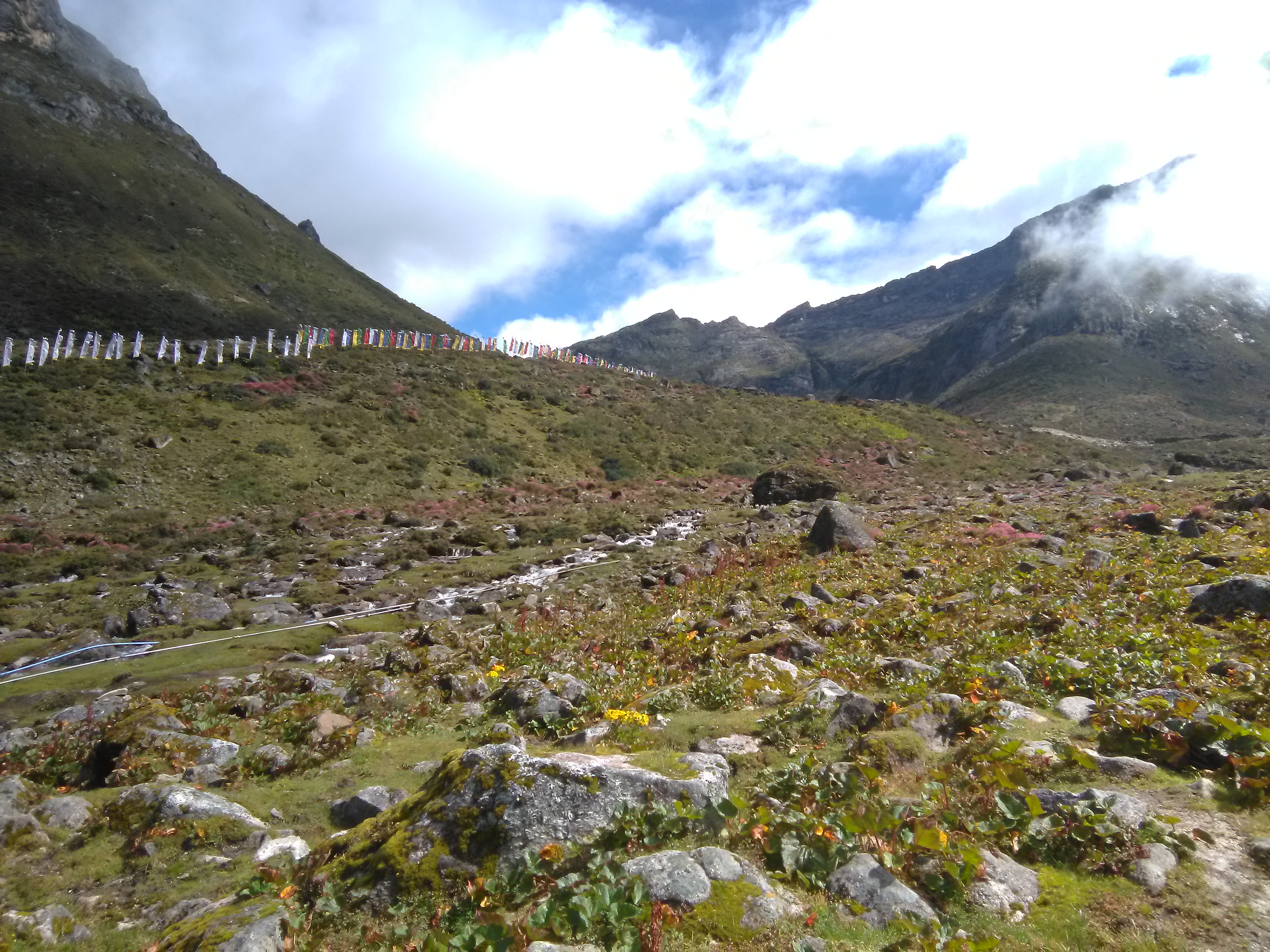
View from Sela Lake

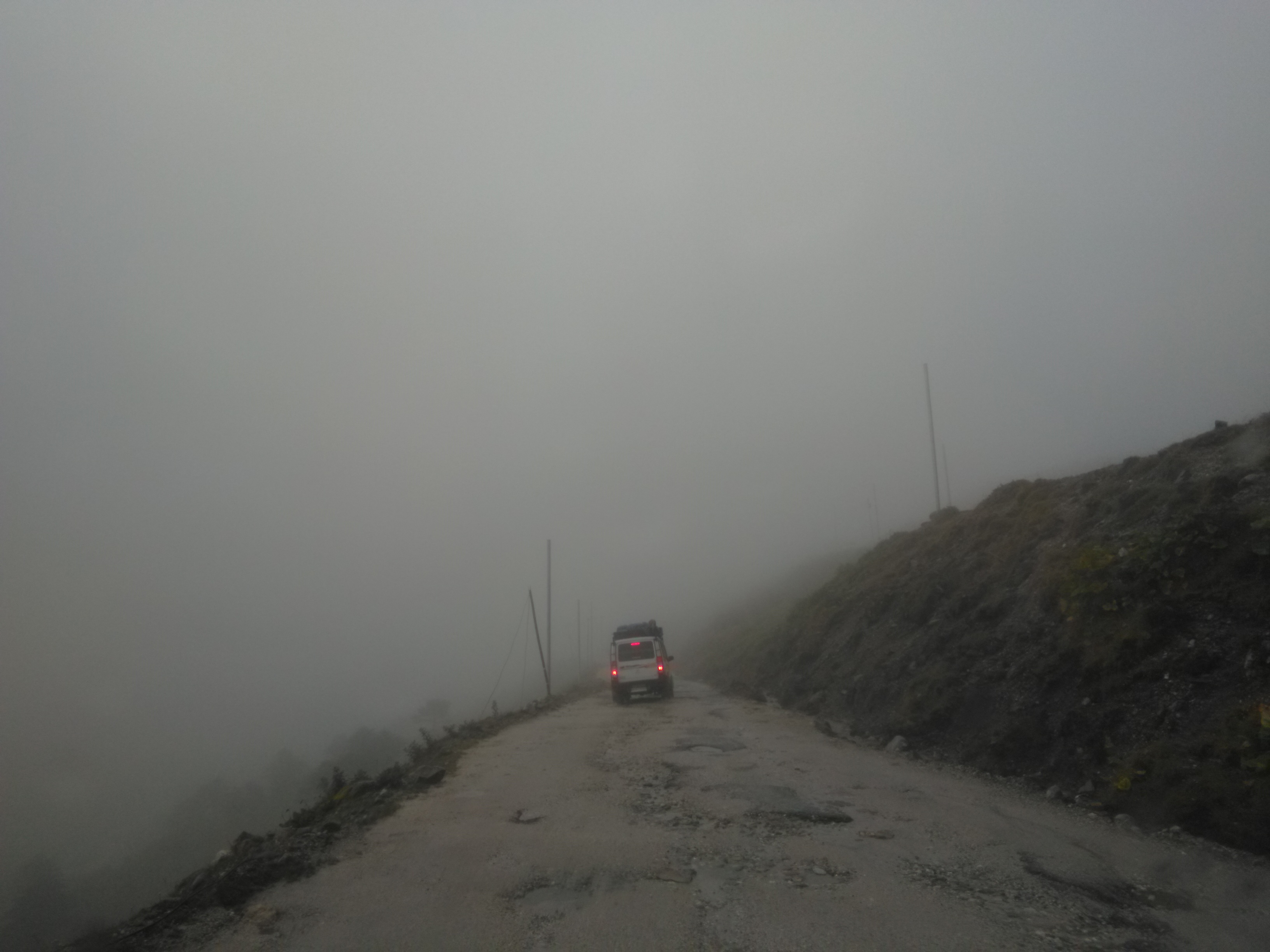
A vehicle navigating Sela Pass

== Etymology ==
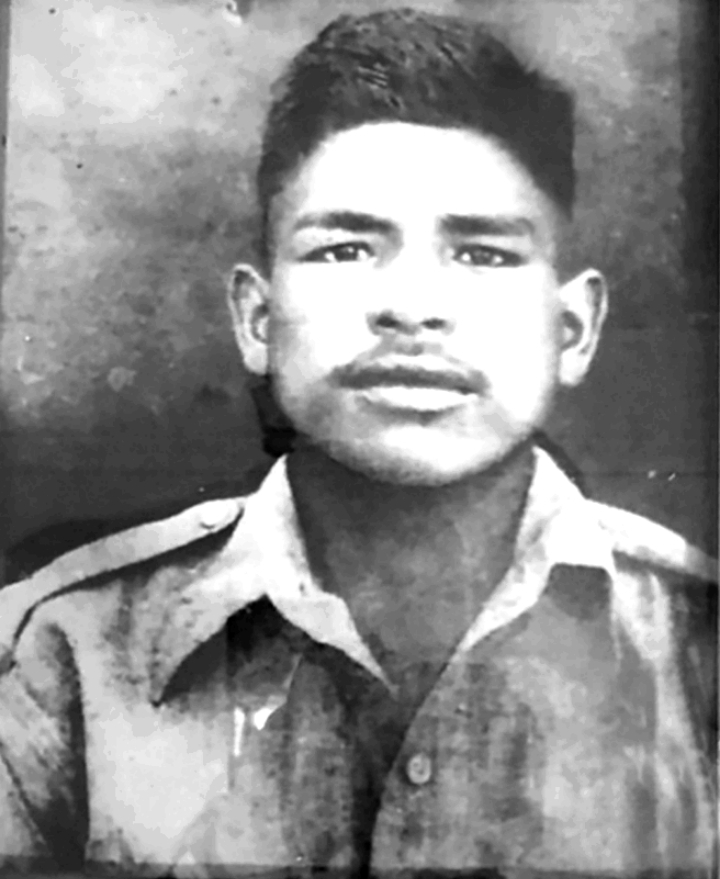
Jaswant Singh who received out from Sela and Nura

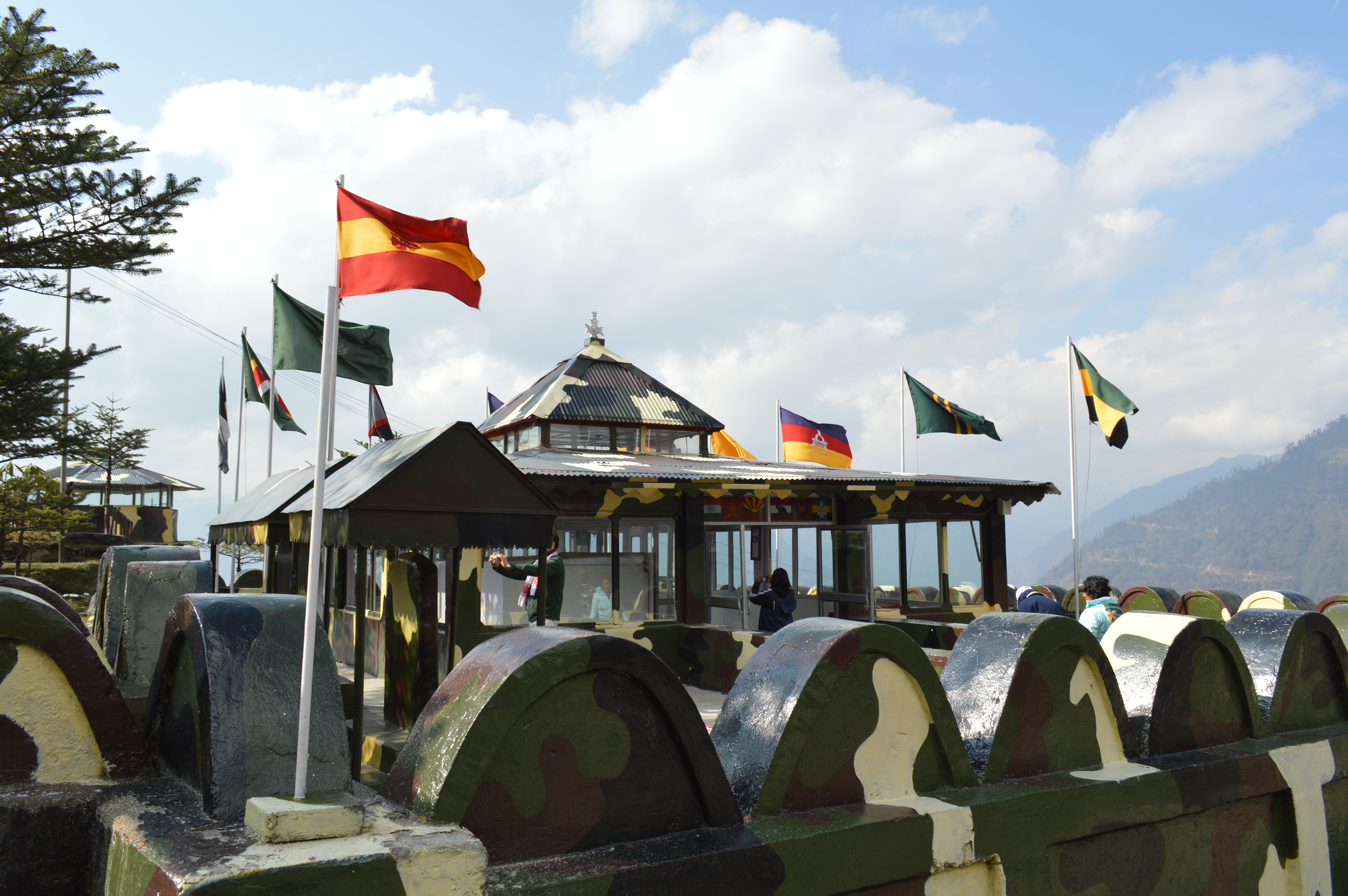
Jaswant Garh War Memorial, Jaswantgarh, Arunachal Pradesh

During the 1962 Sino-Indian War, Maha Vir Chakra awardee Jaswant Singh Rawat held Chinese Army off at this mountain pass with the help of two local Monpa girls named Sela and Noora. Later, Sela was killed and Noora captured. Rushing from position to position, Rawat held off the enemy for 72 hours until the Chinese captured a local supplier, who told them that they were facing only one fighter. The Chinese then stormed Rawat's position and Rawat was killed. the Indian army built Jaswant Garh war memorial for Jaswant Singh and the pass, tunnel & lake were named after Sela for her sacrifice. The tunnel is also named after her. Nuranang Falls, 2 km east of Jang, are named after Nura.

== Geography ==
Sela Pass crosses a subrange of the Himalayas that separates Tawang District from the rest of India. The pass is 4170 m (13,700 ft) high and is situated at a distance of 78 km from Tawang town and 340 km from Guwahati. While the Border Roads Organization (BRO) of India works to keep the pass open throughout the year, it may shut down temporarily after landslides and during heavy snow. Summers at Sela Pass are not very cold, but temperature in winter can dip down to -10 degree Celsius. Sela lake is a large lake located on the north side of the pass at an elevation of 4,160 metres (13,650 ft). This lake often freezes during the winter and is drained in Nuranang River, a tributary of the Tawang River. Limited vegetation grows around the lake, which is used as a grazing site for yaks during the summer.

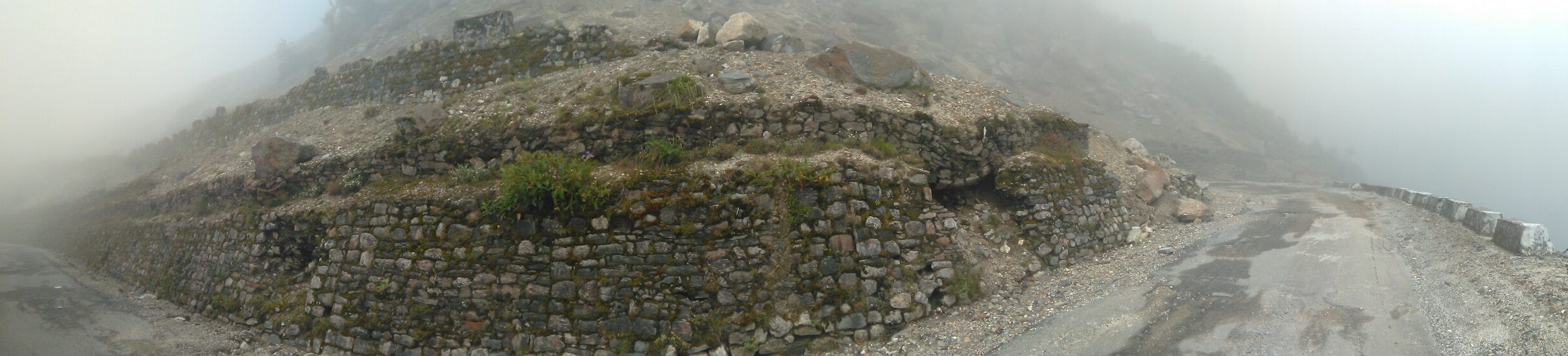
Panoramic View of Sela Pass

== Tunnel ==
Sela Tunnel, Government of India announced the funding for construction of all weather road transport tunnel in 2018-19 budget. Construction started in January 2019. The plan included two tunnels (980 metres and 1,555 metres long) and a link road (1,200 metres long).

Sela Tunnel is a road tunnel at 3,000 metres (9,800 ft) which ensures all-weather connectivity between Guwahati in Assam and Tawang in Arunachal Pradesh. This tunnel is the longest bi-lane tunnel in the world at 13,000 feet. Situated 400 metres below the Sela Pass, the Sela Tunnel offers a vital passage, especially during the winter season. The tunnel helps move troops, weapons, and machinery quickly along the Sino-India border. It is connected with NH13 by a new 12.4 km road and has reduced the distance between Dirang and Tawang by 10 km. It was inaugurated by PM Modi on 9 March 2024. Executed by the Border Road Organisation (BRO), the project features two tunnels and a link road. Tunnel 1 is a 980-metre-long single-tube tunnel, while Tunnel 2 is a 1,555-metre-long twin-tube tunnel, with one bi-lane tube for traffic and the other for emergency services. The link road between these tunnels spans 1,200 metres. The tunnel provides access to Tawang by an all-weather road in the western region of Arunachal Pradesh throughout the year.

The Indian railway has undertaken the final location survey of Strategically important railway project to bring Tawang on railway map through Bhalukpong-Tawang railway, which will also pass through this region.

== Religion ==
Sela Pass is a sacred site in Tibetan Buddhism. Buddhists believe that there are about 101 sacred lakes in and around the pass.

== Sino-Indian War ==
During the Sino-Indian War in 1962, the Sela Pass was one of the locations that saw significant action. The Chinese PLA infiltrated into the south of the ridge through other routes and the Indian position was withdrawn. A sepoy of the Indian Army named Jaswant Singh Rawat remained at the pass fighting rearguard action, and is said to have held off the Chinese for 72 hours. He was awarded the Maha Vir Chakra posthumously for his courage and devotion to duty.

== Gallery ==
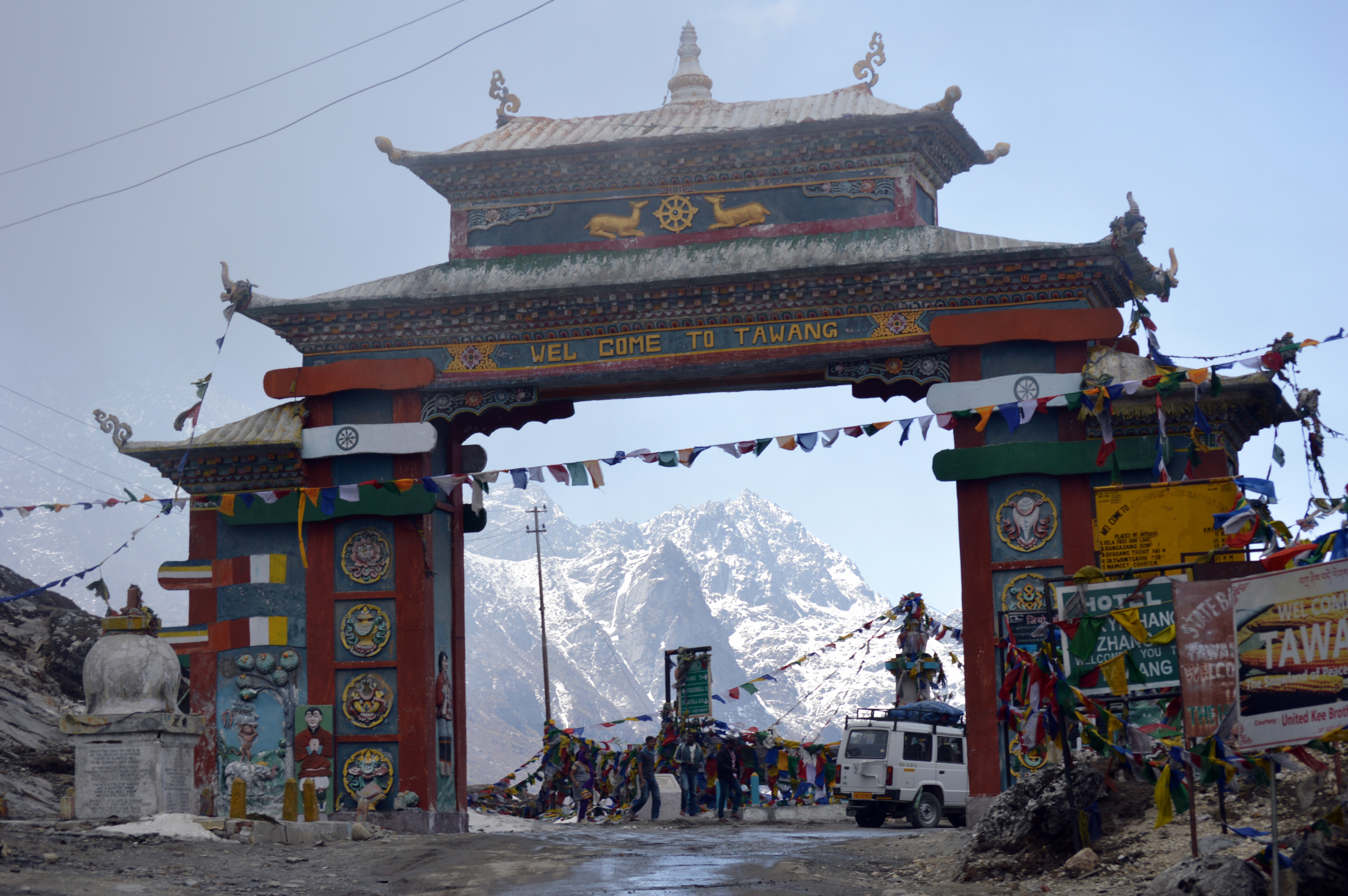
Sela Pass Gate

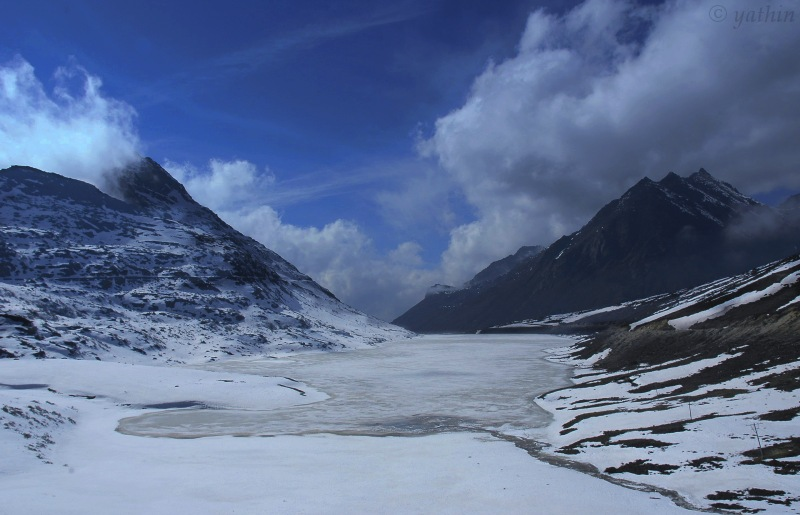
Clouds moving into the pass

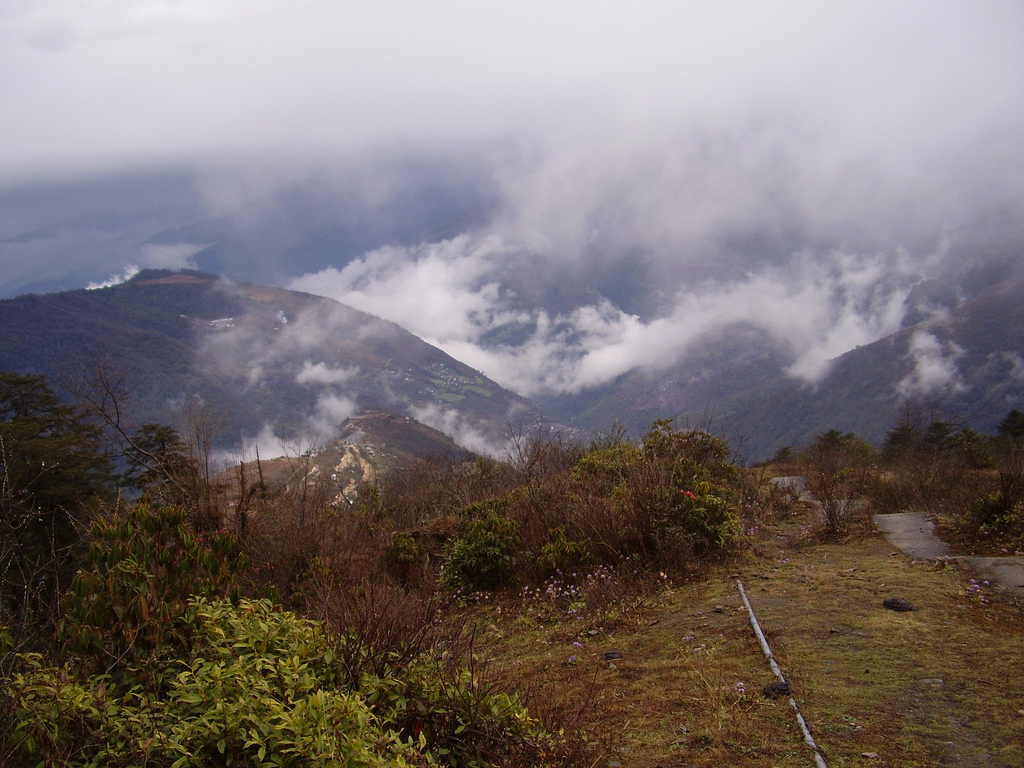
Sela Pass

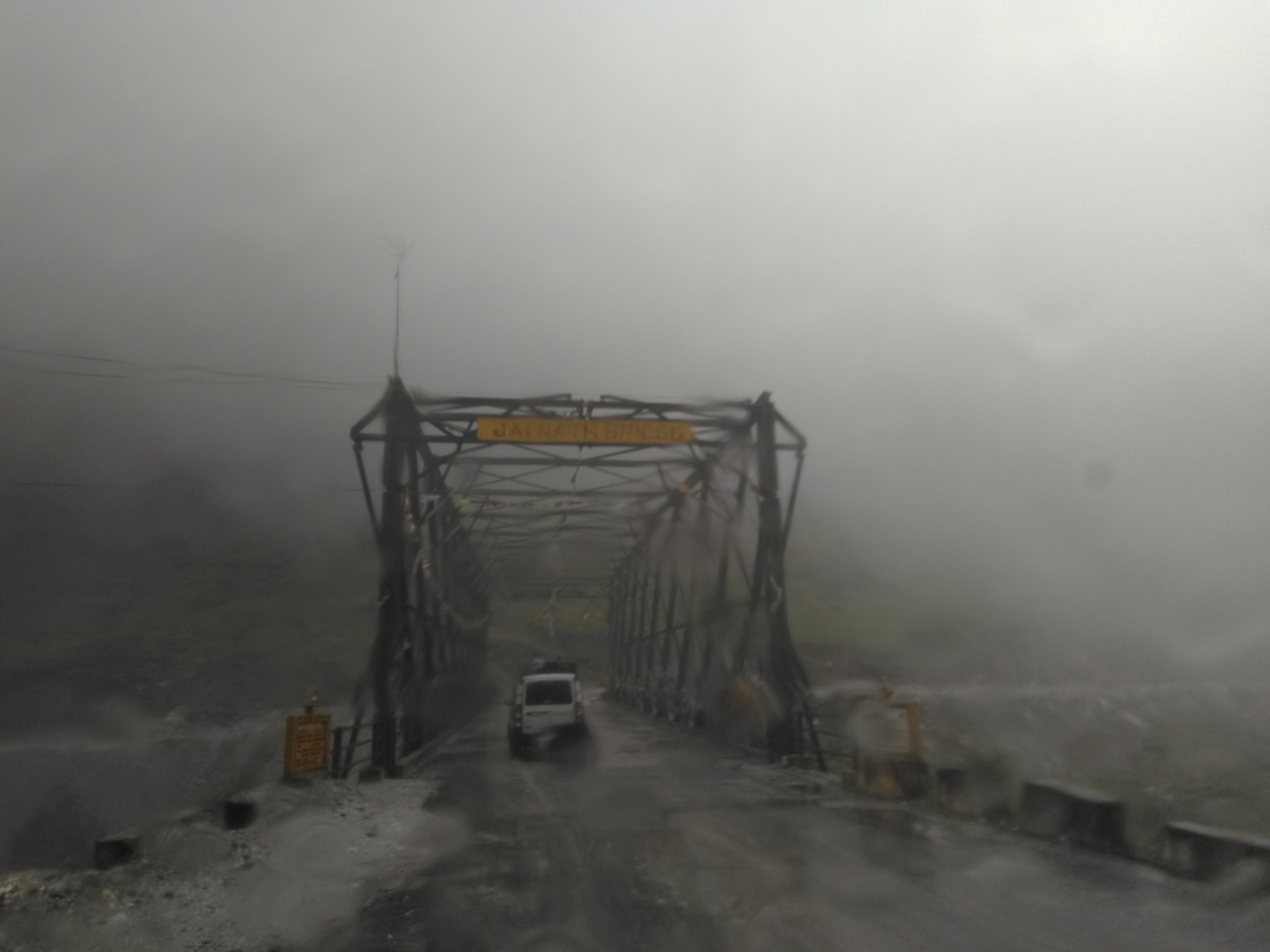
Jainath Bridge, Sela Pass

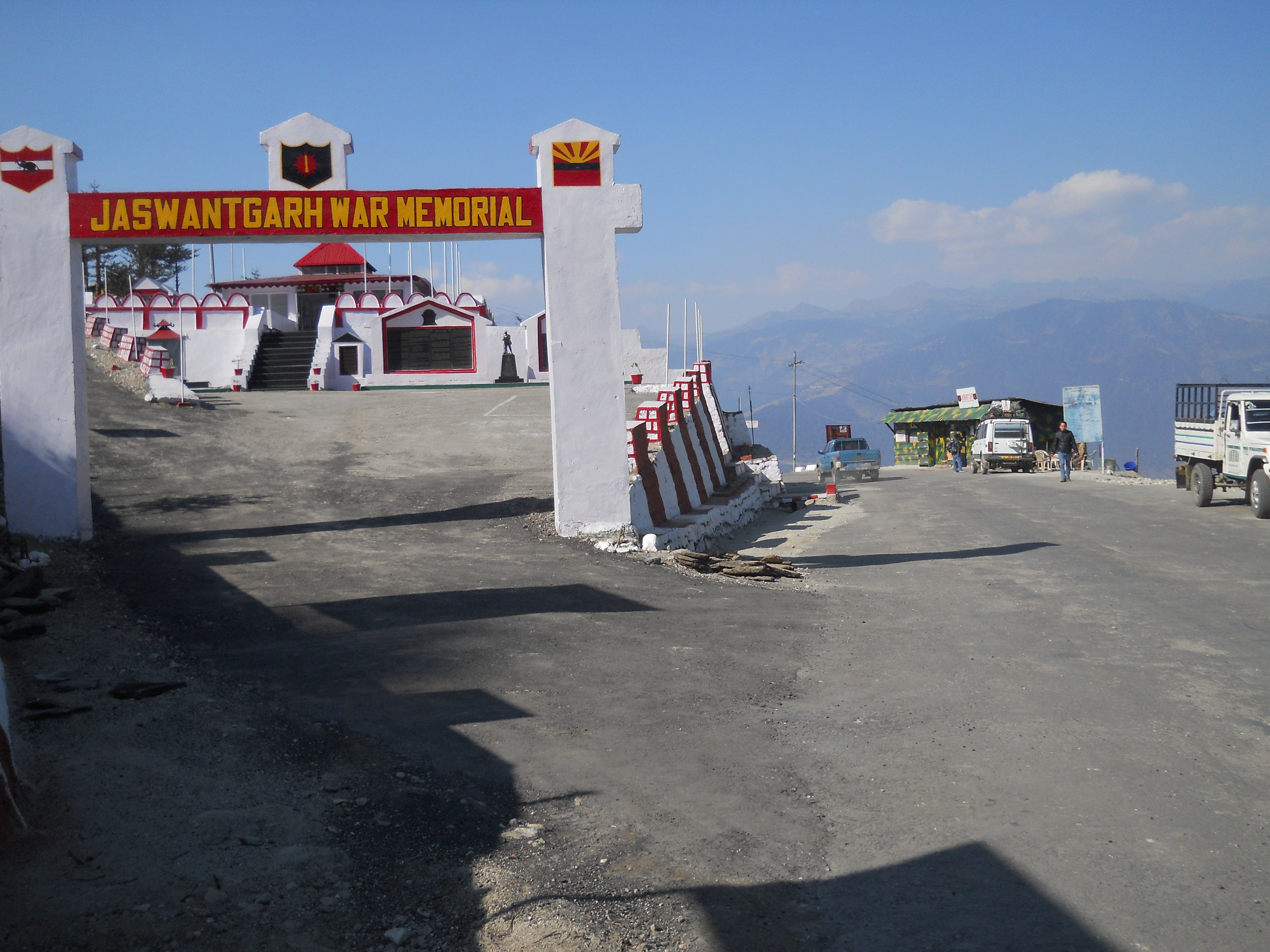
View of Jaswant Garh

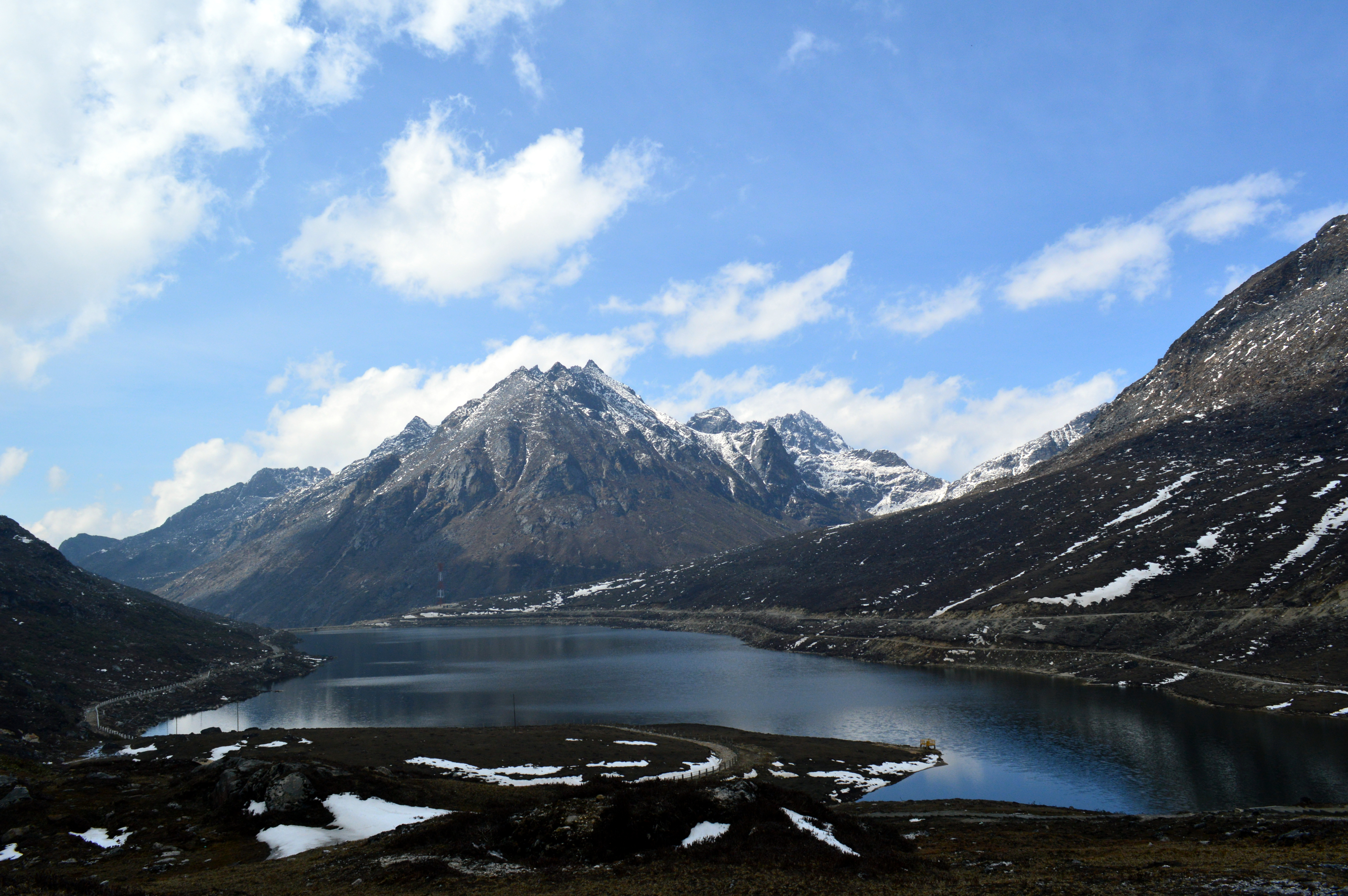
Sela Pass, Arunachal Pradesh, India

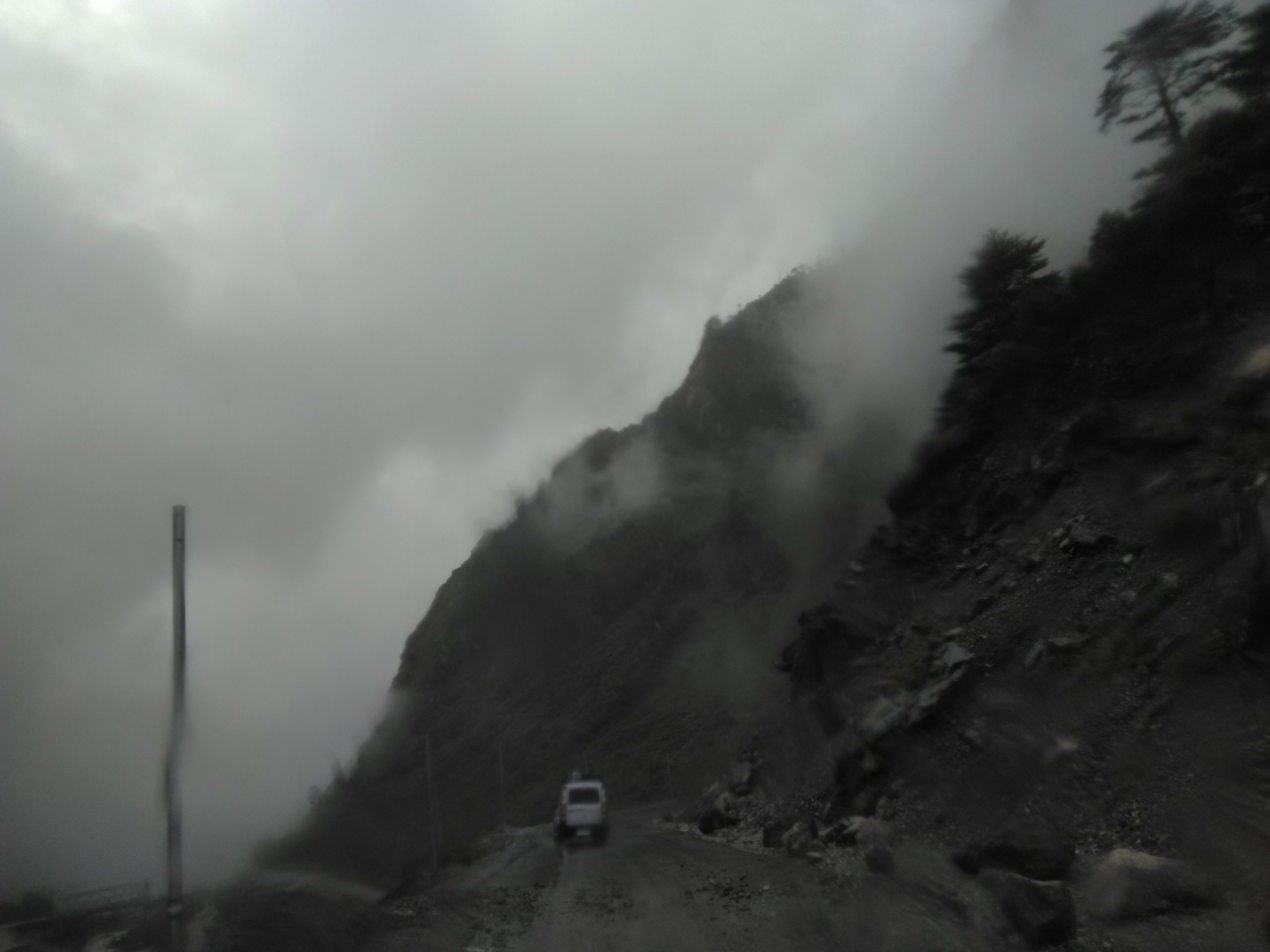
Sela Pass is prone heavy landslides

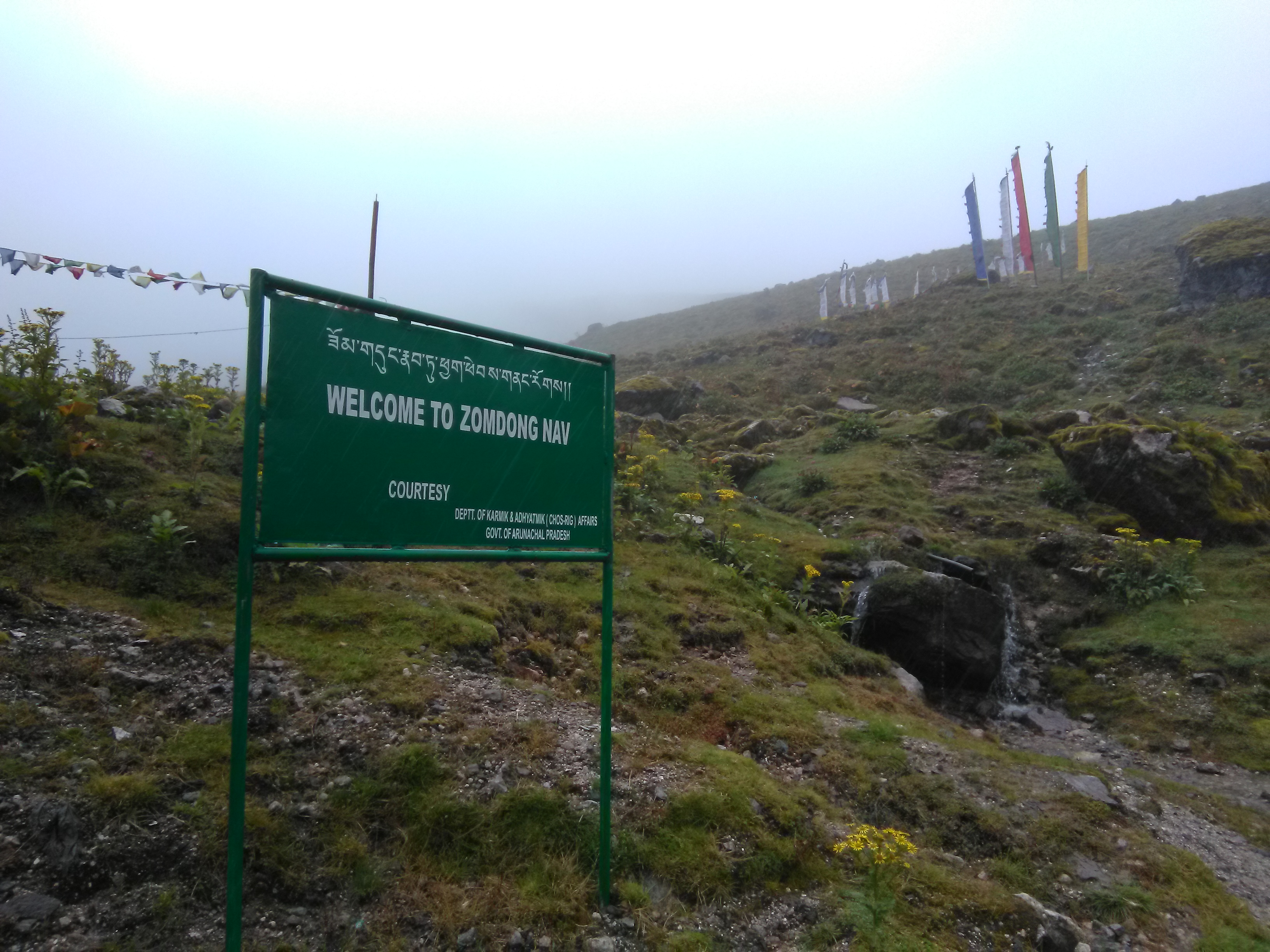
A village in the middle of Sela Pass

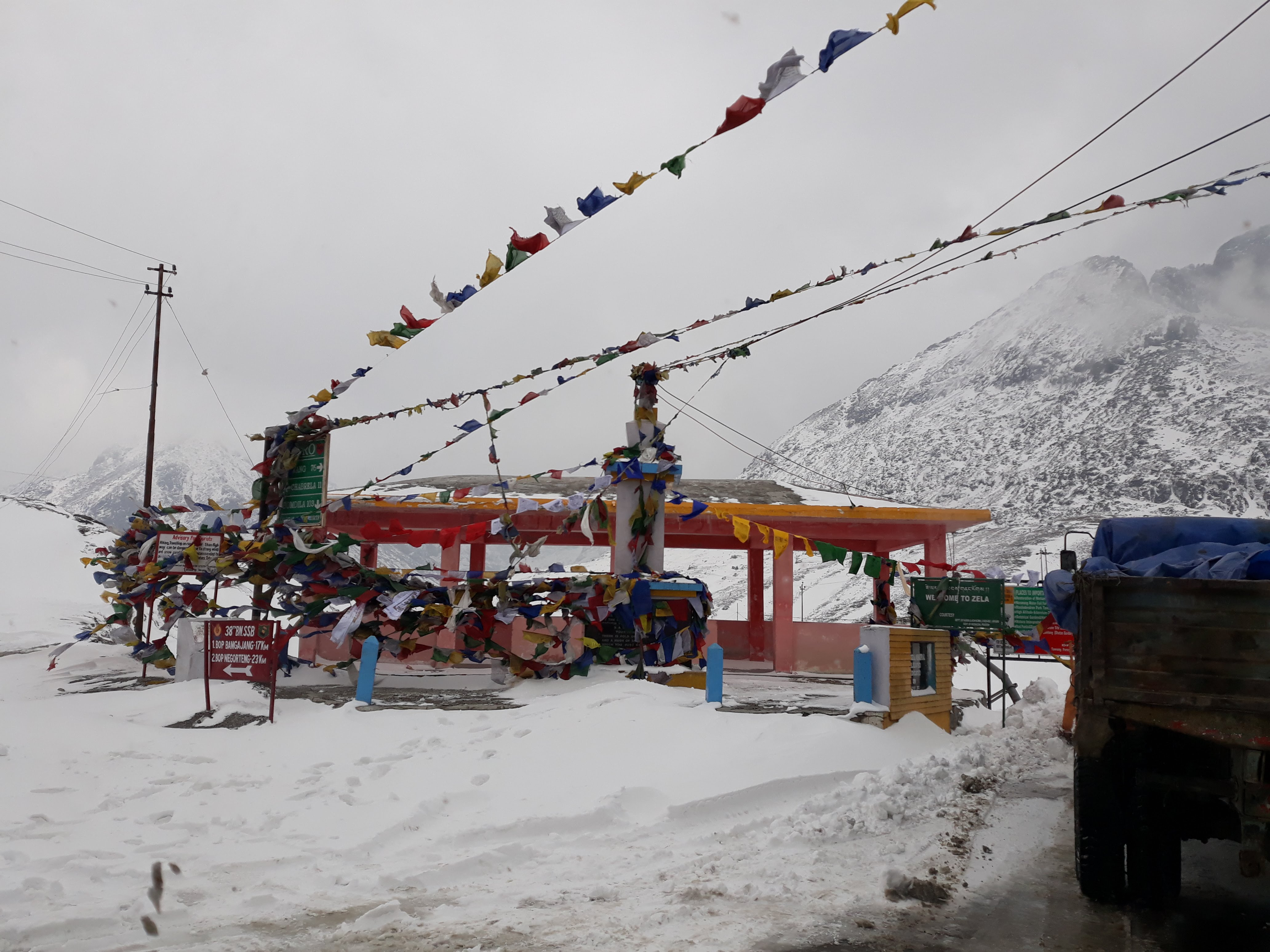
Sela Pass captured in March 2018

== See also ==
- Tourism in North East India
- Tawang Town
- Tawang Monastery
- Bhalukpong-Tawang railway, under-construction
- 2022 Yangtse clash
