= Sela Tunnel =

Road tunnel in Indian state of Arunachal Pradesh

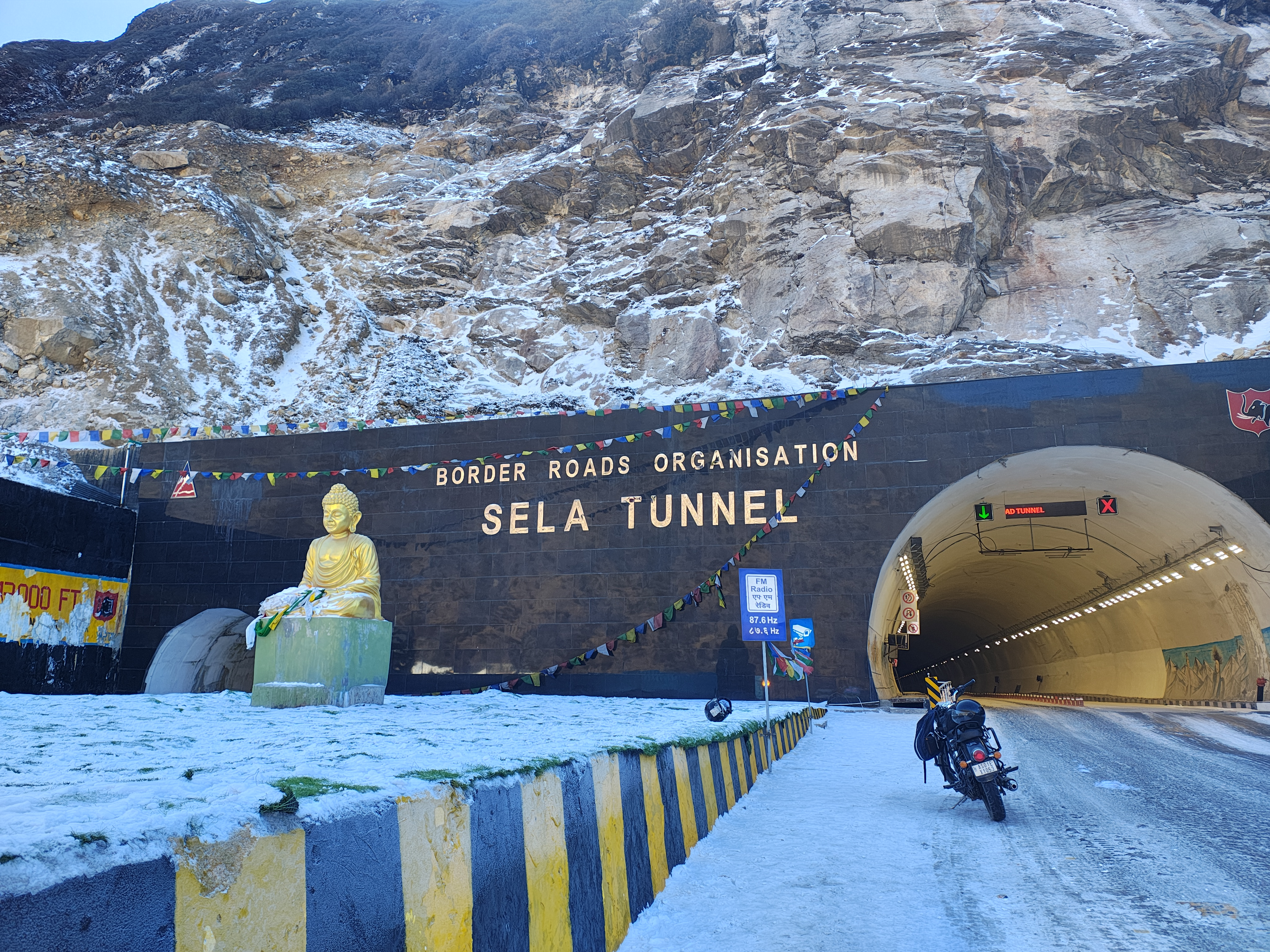
- Entrance of Sela Tunnel in 2025

- Location within Arunachal Pradesh

Overview
- Location: Sela Pass, Tawang district, India
- Coordinates: 27.5073°N 92.0827°E
- Status: Inaugurated

Operation
- Work began: 15 October 2020
- Opened: 9 March 2024
- Operator: National Highways and Infrastructure Development Corporation Limited (NHIDCL)
- Traffic: Motor vehicles

Technical
- Length: 12.04 km (7.48 mi)
- No. of lanes: Two (one in each direction)

Sela Tunnel is an existing operational road tunnel on NH-13 at 3,000 metres (9,800 ft) which ensures all-weather connectivity between Guwahati in Assam and Tawang in Arunachal Pradesh. This tunnel is the longest bi-lane tunnel in the world at 13,000 feet. Situated 400 metres below the Sela Pass, the Sela Tunnel offers a vital passage, especially during the winter season. The tunnel helps move troops, weapons, and machinery quickly along the Sino-India border. It is connected with NH13 by a new 12.4 km road and has reduced the distance between Dirang and Tawang by 10 km. Executed by the Border Road Organisation (BRO), the project features two tunnels and a link road. Tunnel 1 is a 980-metre-long single-tube tunnel, while Tunnel 2 is a 1,555-metre-long twin-tube tunnel, with one bi-lane tube for traffic and the other for emergency services. The link road between these tunnels spans 1,200 metres. The tunnel provides access to Tawang by an all-weather road in the western region of Arunachal Pradesh throughout the year.

== Etymology ==
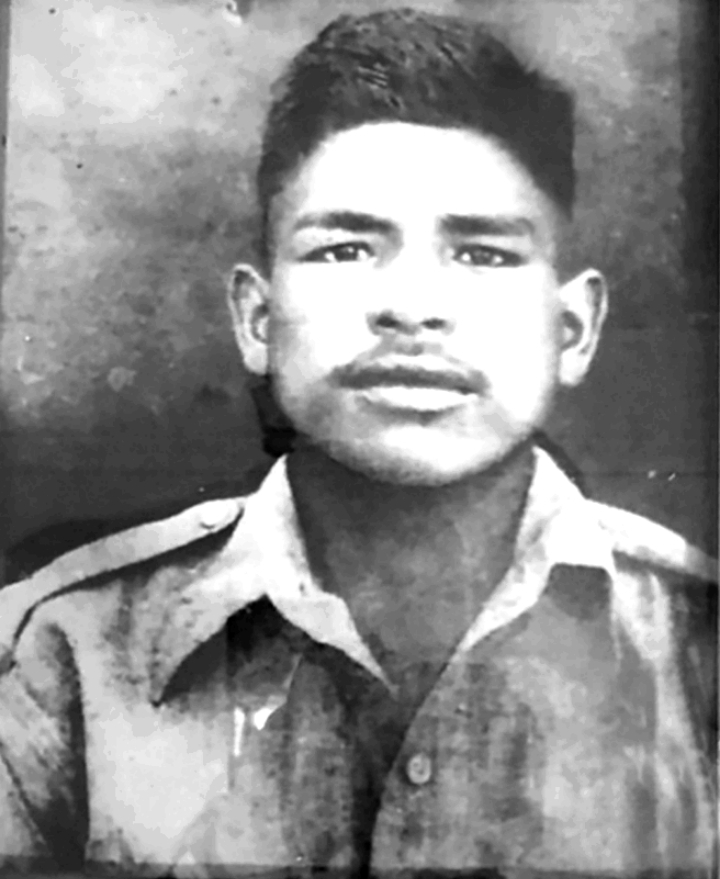
Jaswant Singh who received out from Sela and Nura.

During the 1962 Sino-Indian War, Maha Vir Chakra awardee Jaswant Singh Rawat held elements of the Chinese Army off at this mountain pass with the help of two local Monpa girls named Sela and Noora. Later, Sela was killed and Noora captured. Rushing from position to position, Rawat held off the enemy for 72 hours until the Chinese captured a local supplier, who told them that they were facing only one fighter. The Chinese then stormed Rawat's position and Rawat was killed. The Indian army built Jaswant Garh war memorial for Jaswant Singh, which lies north of Sela Tunnel. The Sela pass, Sela tunnel & Sela lake were named after Sela for her sacrifice. The tunnel is also named after her. Nuranang Falls, north of Sela Tunnel and 2 km east of Jang, are named after Nura. Nyukmadong War Memorial, commemorating sacrifice of Indian soldiers on 18 November 1962 during the Battle of Nyukmadung is south of Sela Tunnel on NH-13.

== History ==
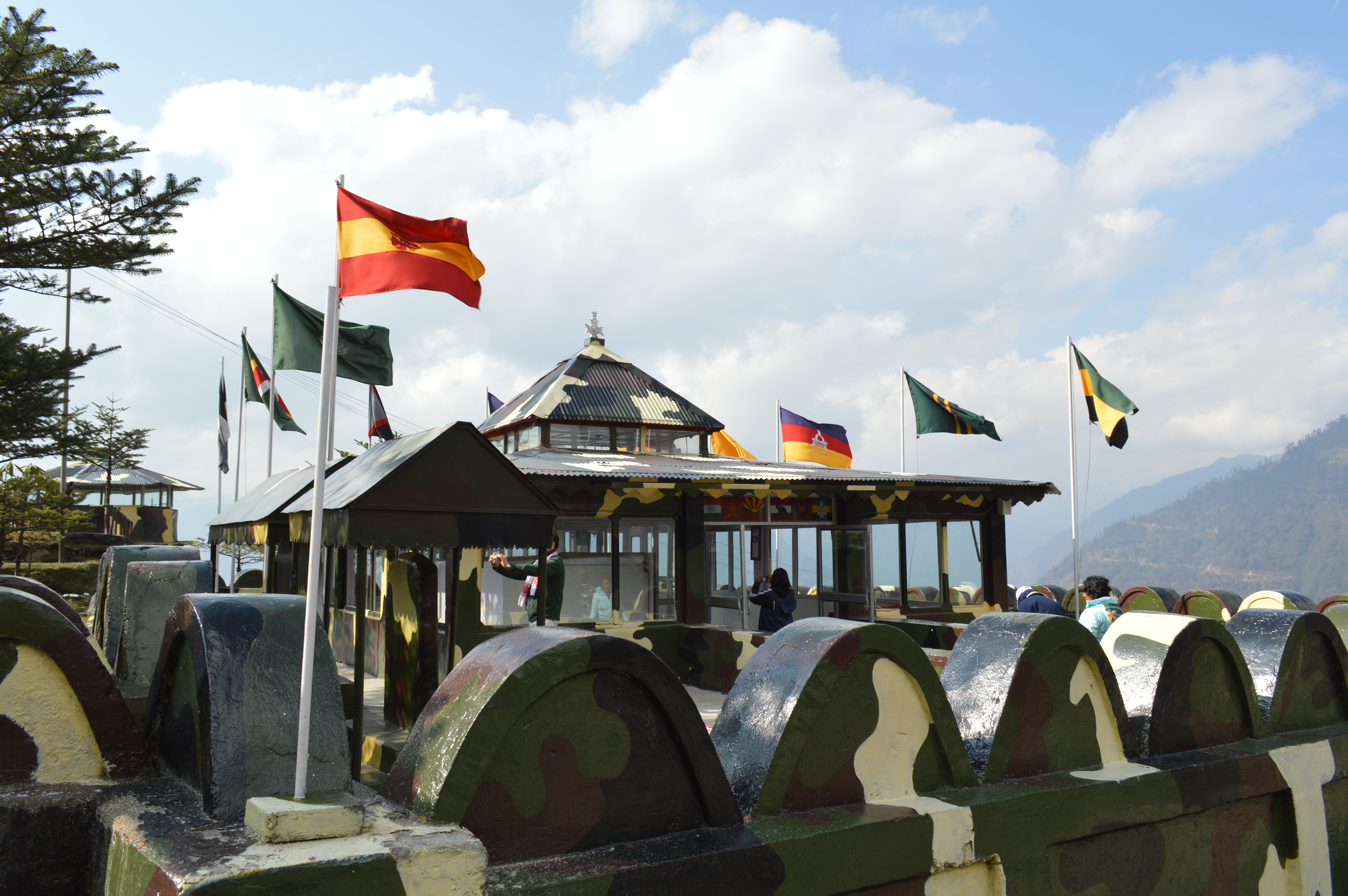
Jaswant Garh War Memorial, Jaswantgarh, Arunachal Pradesh

This strategic tunnel was constructed by the Border Roads Organisation (BRO) under Project Vartak.

In February 2018, the Sela Tunnel Project was announced in the 2018-19 union budget, in February 2019, the foundation stone laid by Prime Minister Narendra Modi. Tunnel to be ready in three years by February 2022. and the construction of the approach road and tunnel boring commenced in February 2019.

In July 2021, the excavation of the 980 m escape tube was completed, which facilitated the faster completion of Sela Tunnel by undertaking simultaneous activities in two-way tube of 1,555 m besides 8.8 km of approach roads.

In March 2024, Prime Minister of India Narendra Modi dedicated the completed tunnel to the nation before a rally in Arunachal Pradesh.

== Features ==
=== Twin tunnels ===
The Sela Tunnel project involves two tunnels. The first tunnel, 475 metres (1,558 ft) long, cuts through a longitudinal ridge entering it at 27.4994°N 92.0938°E. After emerging, a second tunnel, 1,790 metres (5,870 ft) long, runs through the main Sela–Chabrela ridge at 27.5073°N 92.0827°E. The two tunnels together bypass the Sela Pass and maintain an elevation of 3000 m. Sela pass is located at 4,200 m but the two tunnels are located at the height of 3,000 m (10,000 feet). The tunnel cuts through Sela-Chabrela ridge. A new greenfield road 12.37 km long from the tunnel will meet the existing Balipara-Chaudur-Tawang road on the Nurarang side and the hairpin bends to the Sela Pass will be avoided. The tunnel constructed using the latest New Austrian Tunneling Method (NATM) is much below the snow line allowing all weather travel without the challenges of snow clearance.

=== Strategic importance ===
The Sela Tunnel enhances Indian military's capabilities in combating the threat of China's Western Theater Command opposite India's eastern sector of India-Tibet Line of Actual Control (LAC).

The tunnel ensure that the 171 km road between Bomdila and Tawang remains accessible in all weather conditions.

It cuts the travel time from the Indian Army's IV Corps headquarter at Tezpur to Tawang by at least 10 km or 1 hour and also help make the NH13 an all-weather road to access Tawang which usually gets disconnected during winter.

The tunnel enhances the tourist potential of Tawang by attracting more tourists, making Tawang a more popular destination in North East region.

== Route ==
=== Location ===
The Sela Tunnel cuts through the Sela–Charbela ridge, which separates the Tawang district from the West Kameng district (Dirang Circle). It is located a few kilometres to the west of the Sela Pass. The tunnel runs at an elevation of 3,000 metres (9,800 ft), in contrast to the Sela Pass at 4,200 metres (13,800 ft). It avoids the winter snowfalls on the Sela Pass in addition to cutting down the travel time to Tawang by an hour.

=== Main route: Sela-Jang-Tawang ===
The Sela tunnel provides shortest and main access to Tawang town from the mainland India. Sela Tunnel lies on the National Highway NH-13 Tawang-Jang-Sela-Dirang route, which is also part of the Trans-Arunachal Highway as well as the Arunachal Frontier Highway. Since 2018, NH13 has been converted to 2-lane road.

=== Alternate route: Sela-Begajang Gompa-Jang ===
From Sela Tunnel, the BRO has constructed and operationalised an alternate route in December 2025, from Sela Lake to Chabrela, Begajang Gompa (BJ Gompa), Dungjee and Jang, which acts as the alternate route to the main NH-13 route.

== Other related developments ==
=== Smaldar Tunnel ===
Smaldar Tunnel, northwest of Tawang town is in the planning stage. In February 2026, the DPR for the Smaldar Tunnel, northwest of Tawang Town and under the hairpin bends south of Dung between Lumla and Zemithang in the Nyamjang Chu river valley, was in the advanced stage.

=== Tawang-Sangetsar-Bum La Road ===
North of Tawang, the BRO is also improving the road from Tawang, Sangetsar Tso to Bum La Pass on India-China Line of Actual Control (disputed parts of McMahon Line).

== Present status ==
Since its completion in March 2024, the all-weather tunnel is operational for the civilian and military use.

== See also ==
- India-China Border Roads
- Bhalukpong-Tawang railway, under-construction
- Arunachal Frontier Highway, proposed along Indo-China LOC in upper Arunachal Pradesh
- East-West Industrial Corridor Highway, proposed in lower foothills of Arunachal Pradesh
- Northeast Connectivity projects
- Look-East Connectivity projects
- Sonamarg Tunnel earlier called Z-Morh Tunnel
- Zoji-la Tunnel
