= Tawang =

- Town
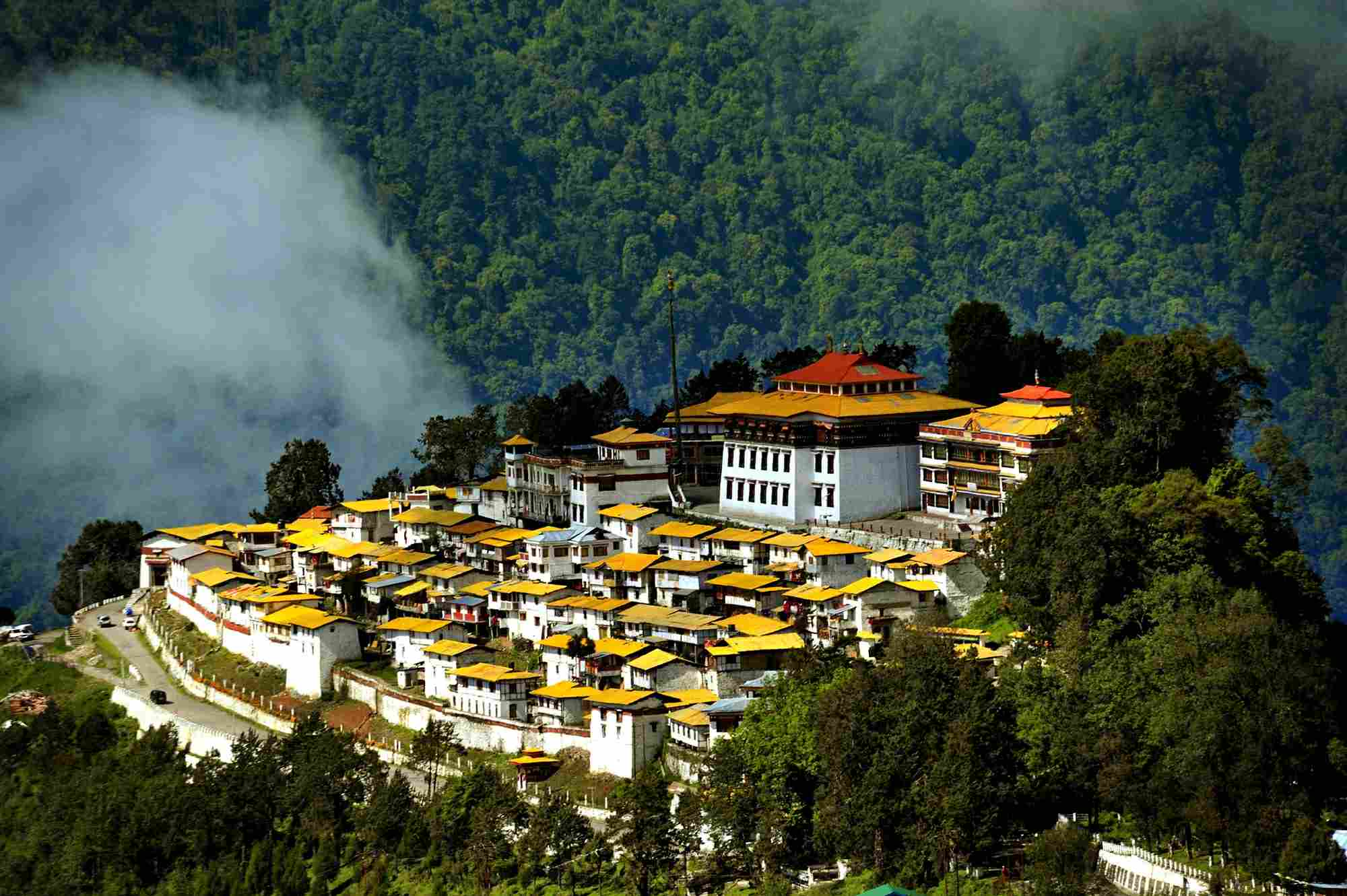
- Tawang Monastery

- Location in Arunachal Pradesh, India Tawang (India)
- Coordinates: 27°35′18″N 91°51′55″E
- Country: India
- State: Arunachal Pradesh
- District: Tawang

Government
  - Type: Municipal Council
  - Body: Tawang Municipal Council (AR)
- Elevation: 3,000 m (9,800 ft)

Population (2011)
  - Total: 11,202
- Time zone: UTC+5:30 (IST)
- Vehicle registration: AR-03
- Website: tawang.nic.in

Tawang (Tibetan: རྟ་དབང་, Wylie: Rta-dbang) is a town and administrative headquarter of Tawang district in the Indian state of Arunachal Pradesh. It lies on NH-13 section of Trans-Arunachal Highway. The town was once the headquarter of the Tawang Tract, which is now divided into the Tawang district and the West Kameng district. Tawang continues as the headquarters of the former. Tawang is the main tourist destination of Arunachal Pradesh.

India occupied Tawang in February 1951 and removed Tibetan administration from the area. China continues to claim Tawang as its territory. It is situated 448 km by road north-west of state capital Itanagar at an elevation of approximately 3,000 metres (10,000 ft). It lies to the north of the Tawang Chu river valley, roughly 10 miles (16 km) south of the Line of Actual Control with China. It is the site of a famous Gelugpa Buddhist Monastery.

== Etymology ==
Tawang originates from the Tibetan word Ta means "horse" and wang means "chosen". So, the word Tawang’’ means "chosen by horse".

== History ==
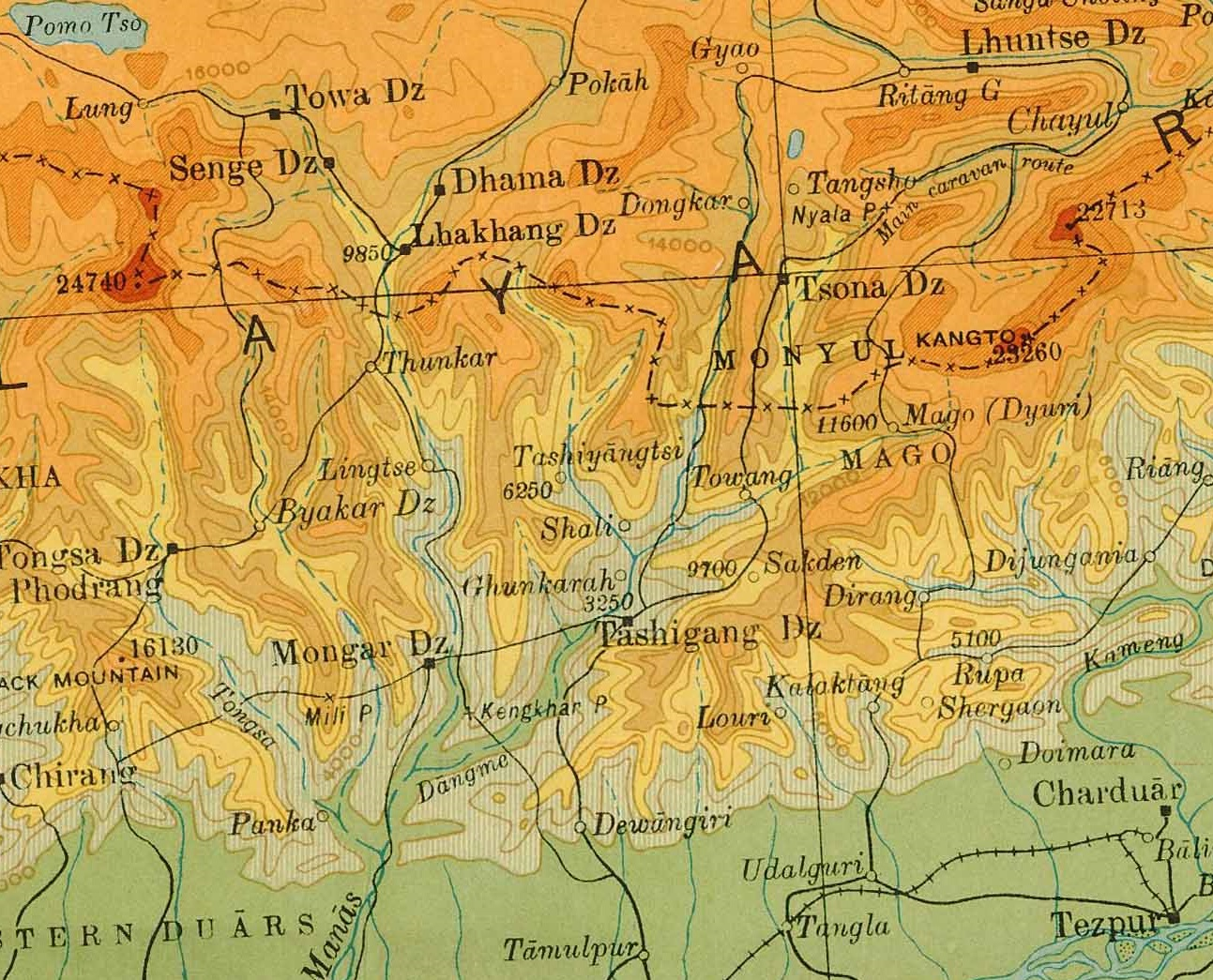
The Monyul region covering Eastern Bhutan and the Tawang tract (Survey of India, 1936)

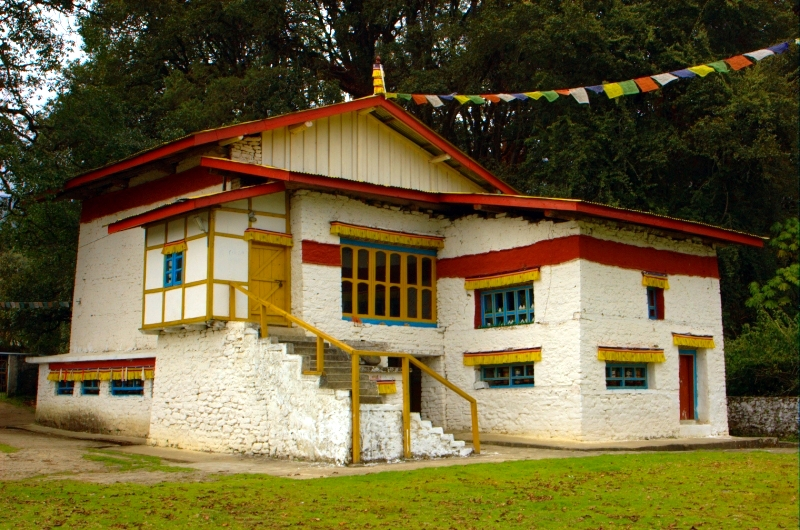
Birthplace of 6th Dalai Lama, Ugyenling Monastery, near Tawang

Tawang is inhabited by the Monpa people. From 500 BC to 600 AD a kingdom known as Lhomon or Monyul ruled the area. The Monyul kingdom was later absorbed into the control of neighbouring Bhutan and Tibet.

The Tawang Monastery was founded by the Merak Lama Lodre Gyatso in 1681 in accordance with the wishes of the 5th Dalai Lama, Ngawang Lobsang Gyatso, and has a legend surrounding its name. Ta means "horse" and wang means "chosen". So, the word Tawang means "chosen by horse". As per legend, the monastery is believed to have been chosen by a horse owned by Mera Lama Lodre Gyatso. The sixth Dalai Lama, Tsangyang Gyatso, was born in Tawang.

Tawang was historically a part of Tibet. During the 1914 Simla Conference, Tibet and British India signed an agreement delineating their common boundary in the Assam Himalaya region, which came to be known as the McMahon Line. By this agreement, Tibet relinquished several hundred square miles of its territory, including Tawang, to the British. The agreement was not recognized by China. According to Tsering Shakya, the British records show that the Tibetans regarded the border agreed in 1914 as being conditional upon China accepting the Simla Convention. Since the British were unable to get China's acceptance, the Tibetans regarded the MacMahon line "invalid".

The British did not implement the McMahon Line for over two decades, during which Tawang continued to be administered by Tibet. When the British botanist Frank Kingdon-Ward crossed the Sela Pass and entered Tawang in 1935 without permission from Tibet, he was briefly arrested. The Tibetan government lodged a formal complaint against Britain. This drew the attention of the British, who re-examined the Indo-Tibetan border, and attempted to revive the McMahon Line. In November, the British government demanded that Tibet implement the border agreement. This met with resistance from the Tibetan government which implied that China's acceptance of the Simla Convention was a prerequisite to all such concerns. Tibet refused to surrender Tawang, partly because of the importance attached to the Tawang Monastery. In 1938 the British made a move to assert sovereignty over Tawang by sending a small military column under Capt. G.S. Lightfoot to Tawang. The invasion was met with strong resistance from the Tibetan government, a serious protest was lodged against the British Indian government.

After the outbreak of the war between China and Japan in 1941, the government of Assam undertook a number of 'forward policy' measures to tighten their hold on the North East Frontier Agency (NEFA) area, which later became Arunachal Pradesh. In 1944 administrative control was extended over the area of the Tawang tract lying south of the Sela Pass when J.P. Mills set up an Assam Rifles post at Dirang Dzong and sent the Tibetan tax-collectors packing. Tibetan protests were brushed aside. However, no steps were taken to evict Tibet from the area north of the pass which contained Tawang town.

The situation continued after India's independence from Britain but underwent a decisive change in 1950 when Tibet lost its autonomy and was annexed into the newly established People's Republic of China.

In February 1951, India sent an official with a small escort and several hundred porters to Tawang and took control of the remainder of the Tawang tract from the Tibetans, removing the Tibetan administration. (Note: The official was Ralengnao Khathing of Manipur, the Assistant Political Officer of the Sela subagency (now West Kameng district). He was accompanied by two platoons of Assam Rifles.) The lamas in Tawang Monastery initially complained to the central Tibetan administration in Lhasa, who in turn complained to the Indian External Affairs Ministry. The ministry replied that Tawang has been part of India since the Simla Convention of 1914.

Tawang was the first city in India the 14th Dalai Lama reached in his escape from China on 31 March 1959.

During the Sino-Indian war of 1962, Tawang was briefly under Chinese control, but China voluntarily withdrew its troops at the end of the war, and Tawang returned to Indian administration. But China has not relinquished its claims on most of Arunachal Pradesh including Tawang.

In 2007, the Dalai Lama acknowledged that both the Tibetan government and Britain recognized the McMahon Line in 1914. He visited Tawang on 8 November 2009. About 30,000 people, including those from neighbouring Nepal and Bhutan, attended his religious discourse.

== Geography ==
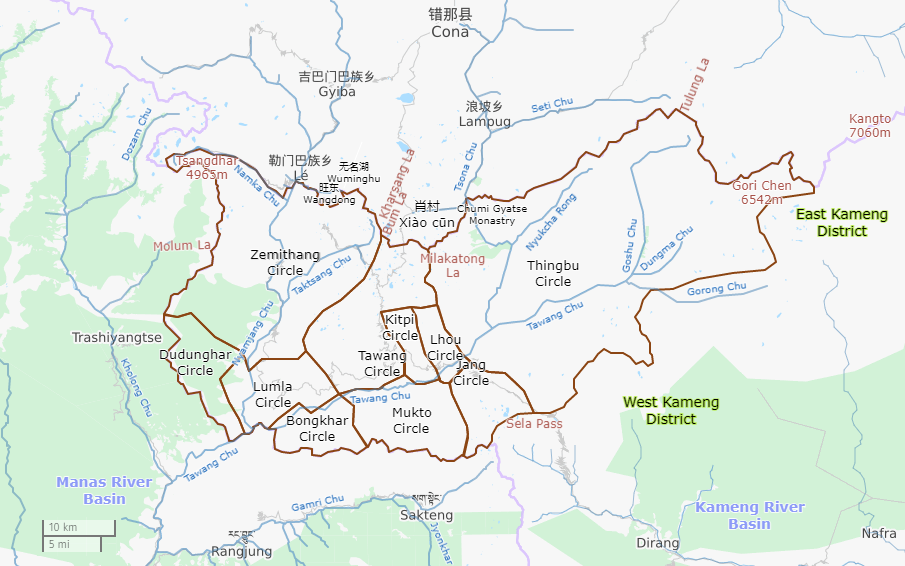
Tawang district

Tawang town is located approximately 555 kilometres (345 mi) from Guwahati and 320 kilometres (200 mi) from Tezpur. Tawang has an average elevation of 2,669 metres (8,757 ft). Tawang, north of Sela Pass/Tunnel, is in the basin of Tawang Chu.

== Climate ==
The climate is cold in Tawang. In winter, there is much less rainfall in Tawang than in summer. According to Köppen and Geiger, this climate is classified as warm-summer humid continental climate (Dwb). The average temperature in Tawang is 5.5 °C. The average annual rainfall is 3,080 millimetres (121 in).

Climate data for Tawang
Month	Jan	Feb	Mar	Apr	May	Jun	Jul	Aug	Sep	Oct	Nov	Dec	Year
Mean daily maximum °C (°F)	3.6 (38.5)	4.2 (39.6)	6.0 (42.8)	9.9 (49.8)	13.1 (55.6)	15.3 (59.5)	15.5 (59.9)	15.7 (60.3)	14.7 (58.5)	11.9 (53.4)	8.2 (46.8)	5.3 (41.5)	10.3 (50.5)
Daily mean °C (°F)	−2.4 (27.7)	−1.0 (30.2)	1.6 (34.9)	4.8 (40.6)	8.0 (46.4)	11.2 (52.2)	12.1 (53.8)	11.9 (53.4)	10.5 (50.9)	6.7 (44.1)	2.8 (37.0)	−0.2 (31.6)	5.5 (41.9)
Mean daily minimum °C (°F)	−8.8 (16.2)	−7.0 (19.4)	−3.4 (25.9)	−0.3 (31.5)	3.0 (37.4)	7.3 (45.1)	9.3 (48.7)	8.9 (48.0)	6.6 (43.9)	1.9 (35.4)	−2.0 (28.4)	−5.4 (22.3)	0.8 (33.5)
Average precipitation mm (inches)	56 (2.2)	102 (4.0)	195 (7.7)	249 (9.8)	231 (9.1)	526 (20.7)	643 (25.3)	466 (18.3)	305 (12.0)	121 (4.8)	45 (1.8)	41 (1.6)	2,980 (117.3)
Average rainy days	10	14	19	20	21	21	22	22	20	11	9	9	198
Average relative humidity (%) (at 17:30 IST)	69	76	81	83	85	89	92	91	88	77	75	74	82
Mean monthly sunshine hours	179.8	146.8	155.0	141.0	167.4	129.0	108.5	130.2	135.0	201.5	171.0	164.3	1,829.5
Mean daily sunshine hours	5.8	5.2	5.0	4.7	5.4	4.3	3.5	4.2	4.5	6.5	5.7	5.3	5.0
Source: Climate-data.org

== Demographics ==
As of the 2011 census, Tawang had a population of 11,202.

== Tawang Monastery ==
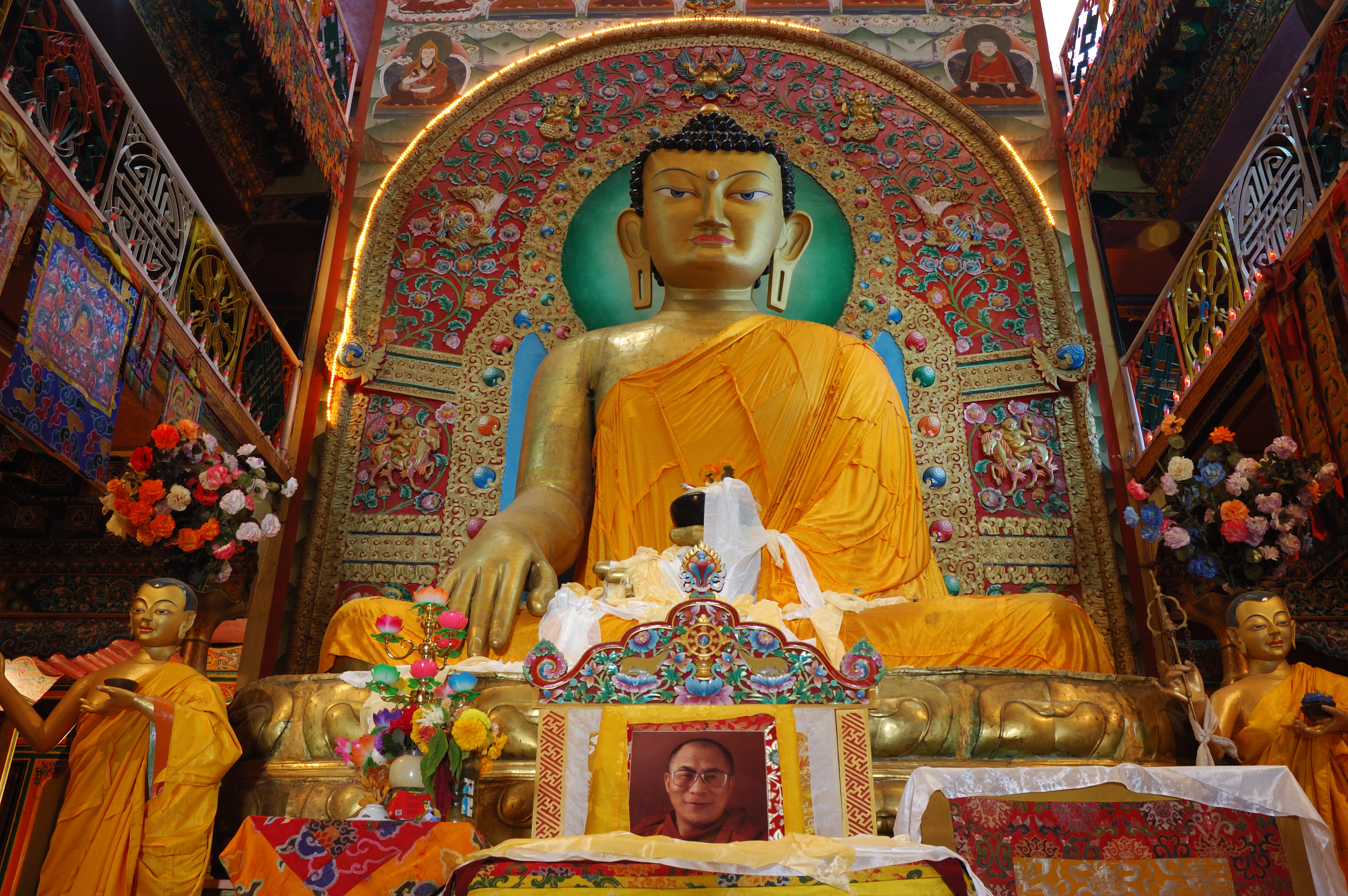
The 8m tall statue of the Shakyamuni Buddha in the Tawang Monastery

Tawang Monastery was founded by the Mera Lama Lodre Gyatso in accordance to the wishes of the 5th Dalai Lama, Nagwang Lobsang Gyatso. It belongs to the Gelugpa sect and is the largest Buddhist monastery in India. The name Tawang (Tibetan: རྟ་དབང་, Wylie: Rta-dbang) means "horse chosen". It is said to be the biggest Buddhist monastery in the world outside of Lhasa, Tibet. It is a major holy site for Tibetan Buddhists as it was the birthplace of the sixth Dalai Lama.

When the 14th Dalai Lama fled from Tibet to escape from the Chinese army, he crossed into India on 30 March 1959 and spent some days at the Tawang Monastery before reaching Tezpur in Assam on 18 April.

== Transportation ==
=== Airport ===
Tawang Air Force Station has an already functional heliport .The Indian Airforce (IAF) has offered the upgraded ALG in Tawang for the operation of civil helicopter and flights for the tourism and UDAN scheme.

The nearest functional civil airports with scheduled flights are the Lokpriya Gopinath Bordoloi International Airport at Guwahati and Salonibari Airport at Tezpur located at a distance of 450 and 325 kilometers, respectively.

=== Railway ===
The nearest existing railway station is at Naharlagun, which is connected to major cities. A broad-gauge railway line connecting Missamari in Assam with Tawang has been proposed and a survey for the line was sanctioned in 2011.

The proposed 166 km long Bhalukpong–Tawang railway link from the existing Bhalukpong railway station to Tawang in Arunachal Pradesh being undertaken as the national project will boost tourism and enhance the national security with faster movement of troops, it will pass through elevations of over 10,000 feet, 80% of the tracks will be through tunnels and the longest tunnel will be 29.48 km long. This link will reduce the existing 285 km Bhalukpong-Tawang road distance by 119 km, and shorten the road distance. As well as the railway, a 2 lane road highway will also be developed along the rail line. Once completed, further extension plans include a 100 km long western spur to Yongphulla Airport (upgraded by India and jointly used by the Indian Army and Bhutan Army) in eastern Bhutan via Yabab in India and Trashigang in Bhutan.

=== Road ===
Located on the northernmost end of NH 13 of Trans-Arunachal Highway network, Tawang is 447.5 kilometres (278.1 mi) from state capital Itanagar and is connected with buses run by APSRTC and private services.

Border Roads Organisation (BRO) was tasked in July 2020 to build the strategic road from Lumla west of Tawang in India to Trashigang in Bhutan through Sakteng Wildlife Sanctuary which will reduce Guwahati to Tawang by 150 km and enable rapid deployment of troops in eastern Bhutan and in Tawang sector of the India–China–Bhutan border. This will be an upgrade of the existing Malo Road along Manas River (Dangme Chu River in Bhutanse) to National Highway standards. Of this 40 km new winding road the 11 km Khitshang Road–Manlo Road stretch from Duksum on Trashiyangtse–Tashigang Road to Bhutan-India border in the east as well Lumla in India to Bhutan-India border already exists, only 10 km of new road needs to be constructed and the rest will be an upgrade of the existing roads. There are proposals to build more roads to connect eastern Bhutan with western Tawang such as Trashigang–Namshu Road, the Chorten Kora–Zemithang Road, road upgrade in Bhutan to Singye Dzong on Bhutan-China border, and an advance landing ground airstrip near Singye Dzong area along with more helipads in this area.

Sela Tunnel through Sela Pass is an under-construction road tunnel project to ensure all-weather connectivity between Guwahati in Assam and Tawang. The tunnel gets its name from 4170 m (13,700 ft) Sela Pass which this tunnel will cut across and reduce the distance between Dirang and Tawang by 10 km. The Government of India announced the funding for construction of all weather transport tunnel in 2018-19 budget. Construction started in Jan/Feb 2019 and ends by December 2022. The tunnel which is being constructed by the Border Roads Organisation (BRO) will cut the travel time from the Indian Army's IV Corps headquarter at Tezpur to Tawang by at least 10 km or 1 hour, and it will also help make the NH13 an all-weather road to access Tawang which usually gets disconnected during winter. The Pass itself is located at 13,700 feet, but the tunnel will pass through at the height of 10,000 feet. BRO is also improving the road from Sangetsar Tso (north of Tawang) to Bum La Pass on India–China Line of Actual Control. The tenders for construction were floated in 2018, the Government of India Minister laid the foundation stone in February 2019 to commence the construction. The major infrastructure milestone was reached on March 9, 2024 with the inauguration of the Sela Tunnel by the Border Roads Organisation (BRO). Situated at an altitude of approximately 13,000 feet, the tunnel system provides all-weather, year-round access to Tawang, significantly reducing travel time and eliminating the need to cross the snow-prone Sela Pass.

== Tourism ==
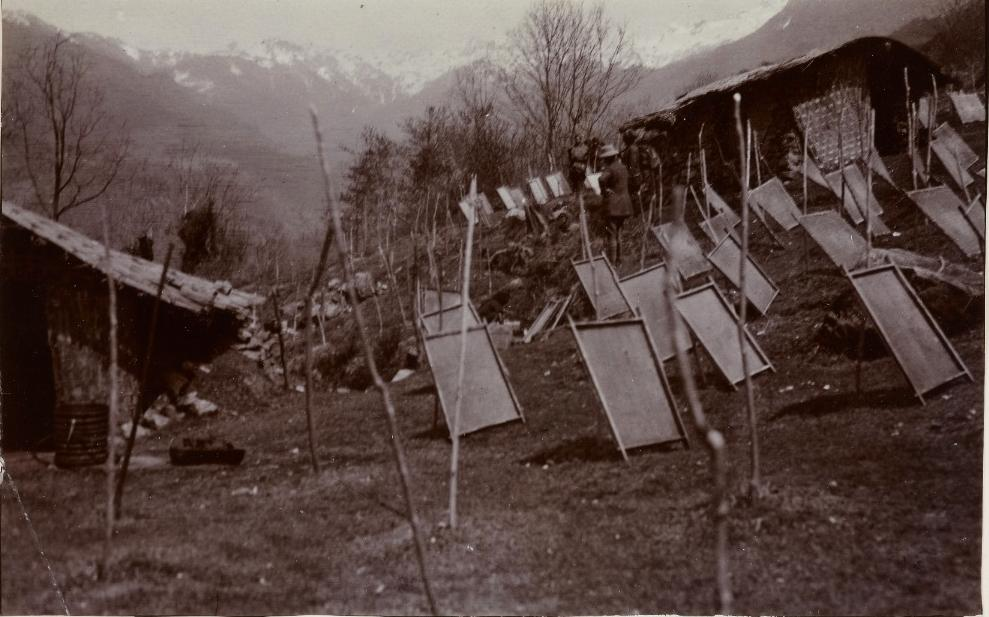
Sheets of paper left to dry on individual moulds on the mountain slope near Tawang, Arunachal Pradesh, 1914

Tawang receives snowfall every year during the months of December–January. There is a ski lift in the town. Tawang is the most famous tourist destination in Arunachal Pradesh.

Visitors to Tawang, as is the case with the entire Arunachal Pradesh, require a special Inner Line Permit (ILP) issued by the concerned government body, which can be obtained from offices situated in Kolkata, Guwahati, Tezpur, and New Delhi. Most of the travel from the plains is on a steep hill road journey, crossing Sela Pass at 4,176 metres (13,701 ft). Tourists can travel to Tawang from Tezpur, Assam by road and Tezpur has direct flights from Kolkata. In Oct 2014, a biweekly helicopter service from Guwahati was started by the Arunachal Pradesh government.

Other notable and worth visiting places include Sela Pass, Bum La Pass, Lumla, Sangetsar Tso (Madhuri Lake), Pangang Teng Tso (PTSO Lake), and Zemithang.

== See also ==
- China–India relations
- Tourism in North East India

== Bibliography ==
- Gyume Dorje. (1999). Footprint Tibet Handbook with Bhutan. Footprint Handbooks, Bath, England. ISBN 0-8442-2190-2.
- Goldstein, Melvyn C. (1991), A History of Modern Tibet, 1913-1951: The Demise of the Lamaist State, University of California Press, ISBN 978-0-520-91176-5
- Maxwell, Neville (1970), India's China War, Pantheon Books, ISBN 978-0-394-47051-1 – via archive.org
  - Maxwell, Neville (1972). India's China War. Anchor Books.
- Mayilvaganan, M.; Khatoon, Nasima; Bej, Sourina, eds. (2020), Tawang, Monpas and Tibetan Buddhism in Transition: Life and Society along the India-China Borderland, Springer Singapore, ISBN 9789811543463
  - Nanda, Neeru (2020), "Tawang and the Mon in their Borderlands: A Historical Overview", in M. Mayilvaganan; Nasima Khatoon; Sourina Bej (eds.), Tawang, Monpas and Tibetan Buddhism in Transition: Life and Society along the India-China Borderland, Springer Singapore, pp. 29–44, ISBN 9789811543463
- Mehra, Parshotam (1974), The McMahon Line and After: A Study of the Triangular Contest on India's North-eastern Frontier Between Britain, China and Tibet, 1904-47, Macmillan, ISBN 9780333157374 – via archive.org
- Richardson, Hugh (1984). Tibet & Its History (2nd ed.). Boston: Shambhala Publications. ISBN 0-87773-376-7.
- Shakya, Tsering (1999), The Dragon in the Land of Snows: A History of Modern Tibet Since 1947, Columbia University Press, pp. 279–, ISBN 978-0-231-11814-9
  - Shakya, Tsering (2012), Dragon In The Land Of Snows: The History of Modern Tibet since 1947, Random House, ISBN 978-1-4481-1429-0
- Tenpa, Lobsang (2018), An Early History of the Mon Region (India) and its Relationship with Tibet and Bhutan, South & Inner Asian Studies/ Tibetan & Himalayan Studies, Library of Tibetan Works and Archives, ISBN 9789387023345
- Van Eekelen, Willem Frederik (1967), Indian Foreign Policy and the Border Dispute with China, Springer, ISBN 978-94-017-6555-8
