= Milakatong La =

Mountain pass between India and Tibet

Milakatong La Pass
- Location within Arunachal Pradesh
- Elevation: 16,500 feet (5,000 m)

Third Approach
- Location: Tawang district, Arunachal Pradesh, India
- Range: Himalaya
- Coordinates: 27°41′N 91°57′E

Milakatong La or Menlakathong La is a historic mountain pass along the trade route between Tawang in India's Arunachal Pradesh and Tsona Dzong in Tibet's Shannan province via the valley of Tsona Chu.

== Location ==
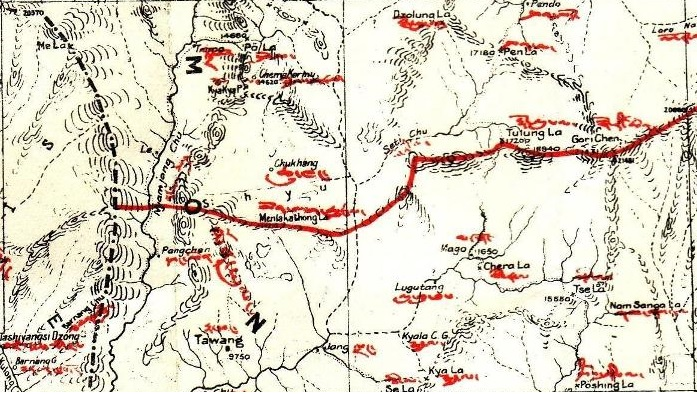
The 1914 McMahon Line map showing the India–Tibet boundary. It places Menlakathong La near the modern Bum La. The map also shows a Chukang (customs house) north of the pass.

The Ludlow–Sherriff expedition to Tibet identified the location of Milakatong La at 27°41′N 91°57′E, at the top of a branch valley of the Tsona Chu valley, leading down to the Tsechu village. Following the valley upstream along Tsona Chu leads one to Tsona Dzong. Following it downstream leads one to the Tawang Chu river.

Other sources suggest a location near the 'Bum La' pass of Ludlow-Sherriff (27°43′N 91°55′E), described as being between "Tulung La and the Bhutan border". (Note: This location is to the east of the present day Bum La border crossing between India and China but on the same ridge line.) The McMahon Line map of 1914 places the Indo-Tibetan border along the mountain range on this axis (labelled "Menlakathong La range"):

the boundary line ... follows the crest of the mountain range which runs from peak 21431 through Tu Lung La and Menlaka-thong La to the Bhutan border. This is the highest mountain range in this tract of country. To the north of it are people of Tibetan descent, to the south the inhabitants are of Bhutanese and Aka extraction. It is unquestionably the correct boundary.

— Henry McMahon

This pass also leads to another branch valley of the Tsona Chu valley, which lies north of the border. Both passes were likely used for trade between Tawang and Tsona Dzong. This perhaps explains the confusion among sources.

== Trade ==
According to F. M. Bailey, there were two trade routes between Tawang and Tsona Dzong, one via Milakatong La and the other via the Nyamjang Chu valley. On each of these roads, a Tsukang (Chukang) or a customs house was placed by the Tibetans and a tax of 10 per cent was collected on all merchandise brought from Tawang. However, there was no tax on articles carried from Tsona Dzong to Tawang.

== See also ==
- Bum La Pass
- Tawang Town
- Tawang Monastery
- Tawang district

== Bibliography ==
- Mehra, Parshotam (1974), The McMahon Line and After: A Study of the Triangular Contest on India's North-eastern Frontier Between Britain, China and Tibet, 1904-47, Macmillan, ISBN 9780333157374 – via archive.org
