= Tulung La =

- Location within Tibet Location within Arunachal Pradesh
- Interactive map of Tulung La
- Elevation: 17,250 feet (5,260 m)

Third Approach
- Location: Tsona County, Tibet, China - Tawang, Arunachal Pradesh, India
- Range: Himalaya
- Coordinates: 27°52′57″N 92°15′04″E

Tulung La (Note: Alternative spellings: Tulang La, Talung La, and Tu Lung La.) (Tibetan: ཐུ་ལུང་ལ་, Wylie: thu lung la) is a border pass between the Tsona County in the Tibet region of China and India's Tawang district in Arunachal Pradesh. It is in the eastern part of the two districts, close to the Gori Chen cluster of mountains, on a watershed between the Tsona Chu river in Tibet and the Tawang Chu in the Tawang district. The watershed ridge forms the border between Tibet and India as per the McMahon Line. Tulung La provided an invasion route to China during the 1962 Sino-Indian War. It is also the scene of occasional clashes between the two sides.

== History ==
=== 1914: McMohan line as Indo-China border ===
During the 1914 Simla Convention conference, the British Indian foreign secretary Henry McMahon and the Tibetan plenipotentiary Lonchen Shatra negotiated the mutual boundary between the two countries, which came to be known as the McMahon Line. McMahon summarised the decision as follows:

the boundary line ...follows the crest of the mountain range which runs from peak 21431 through Tu Lung La and Menlaka-thong La to the Bhutan border. This is the highest mountain range in this tract of country. To the north of it are people of Tibetan descent, to the south the inhabitants are of Bhutanese and Aka extraction. It is unquestionably the correct boundary.

The Republic of China, which did not sign the Simla Convention, disavowed the McMahon boundary by around 1935, and so has the People's Republic of China that succeed it. The border dispute continues between China and India to the present day.

=== 1962 Indo-China war ===
In 1962, China launched a war on India, invading the Tawang district from the north. Tulung La was one of the passes through which the Chinese forces came in. They went via Poshing La and threatened the road route between Bomdila and the Se La pass, an action that made the Indian positions at Se La untenable. India lost the war. But China withdrew to the former positions at the end of the war, declaring that it would work on the border settlement through negotiations. As of 2026, no settlement has yet been reached.

=== 1975 Tulung La ambush ===
In October 1975, there was a clash at the Tulung La pass. The Chinese border troops fired on an Indian patrol belonging to Assam Rifles, killing four out of the six men. According to India, the Chinese ambushed Indian troops 500 metres south of Tulung La and the clash took place on Indian territory. China denied the claim, and blamed the Indian troops who were said to have entered Chinese territory and initiated the clash. The Indian military officer who went to receive the bodies a week later, opined that the soldiers were likely not killed in the shooting, but were subsequently tortured to death. In November 2020, the Chhetri War Memorial was set up at Tulung La to commemorate the slain soldiers, inaugurated by the Arunachal Pradesh chief minister Pema Khandu.

The 1975 Tulung La incident was reminiscent of other peacetime firing incidents prior to the 1962 war, viz., the 1959 Longju incident and the 1959 Kongka Pass incident, which vitiated the relations between the two countries to such an extent that the war became inevitable. However, after 1975, there were no further firing incidents. In 1993, India and China signed a Border Peace and Tranquility Agreement, prohibiting the use of firearms in the vicinity of the border.

== Geography ==
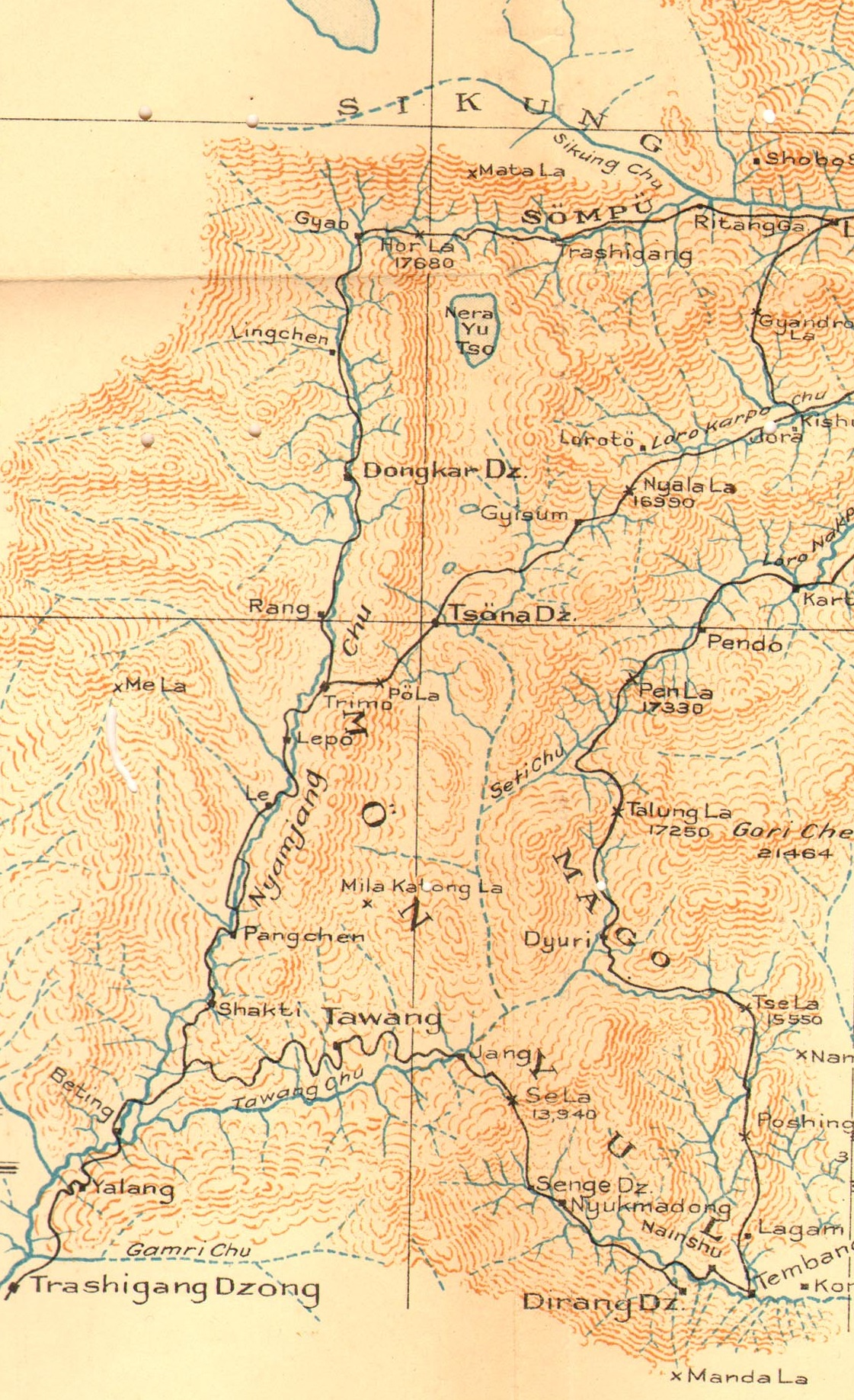
Map of Tsona Dzong and the Tawang region by Bailey and Morshead, showing "Talung La".

Tulung La is at the northeastern corner of the Tawang district. The British political officer F. M. Bailey, who travelled through Tibet in 1912–1913, observed a "main Himalayan range" that runs from the high peaks of Namcha Barwa in an unbroken line till Tulung La. He observed that it continues west towards the border of Bhutan but in a somewhat "broken" way, passing through Milakatong La mentioned earlier by Indian explorer Nain Singh (now recognised as Bum La Pass).

To the north of Tulung La rises one of the headwaters of Seti Chu, a tributary of Tsona Chu, which it joins near the town of Lampug (Langpo). Another headwater of Seti Chu comes from Pen La, connecting the valley to that of the Subansiri valley. To the south of Tulung La is one of the headwaters of Goshu Chu (also called Goro Chu), which joins two other rivers near Mago (27.6876°N 92.2072°E) to form Tawang Chu. One of the three rivers, Gorjo Chu, comes from the southeast, providing an alternative route into the West Kameng district via Tse La.

The Tulung La ridge runs west-southwest dividing the waters of Seti Chu in the north and the Tawang Chu tributaries in the south. It runs till a location called Yangtse, where Tsona Chu runs break through the ridge line, and receives the spectacular Chumi Gyatse Falls falling down a near vertical cliff of the ridge. The entire ridgeline between Tulung La and Yangtse has also been called the "Yangtse ridge" in recent times.

== Transport ==
Tawang-Mago-Chuna-Tulung La Road (TMCTL Road) as part of Arunachal Frontier Highway, rises from Tawang (6,000 ft) to Thingbu HQ and Mago in the east, and Chuna and Tulung La further northeast, was turned into black-topped motorable road in 2025. Earlier it was a narrow mule track.

== See also ==
- Bum La Pass
- Chumi Gyatse Falls
- 2022 Yangtse clash

== Bibliography ==
- Arpi, Claude. 1962 and the McMahon Line Saga. Lancer Publishers LLC. ISBN 978-1-935501-57-2.
- Bailey, F. M. (October 1914), "Exploration on the Tsangpo or Upper Brahmaputra", Geographical Journal, 44 (4): 341–, doi:10.2307/1778591, JSTOR 1778591 – via archive.org
- Bailey, F. M. (1914), Report on an Exploration on the North-East Frontier, 1913, Simla: Government Monotype Press – via archive.org
- Johri, Sitaram (1965), Chinese Invasion of NEFA, Himalaya Publications – via archive.org
- Mehra, Parshotam (1974), The McMahon Line and After: A Study of the Triangular Contest on India's North-eastern Frontier Between Britain, China and Tibet, 1904-47, Macmillan, ISBN 9780333157374 – via archive.org
