= Thingbu =

- Village
- Location in Arunachal Pradesh, India Thingbu (India)
- Coordinates: 27°39′40″N 92°06′00″E
- Country: India
- State: Arunachal Pradesh
- District: Tawang district
- Elevation: 3,350 m (10,990 ft)

Languages
  - Official: English
- Time zone: UTC+05:30 (IST)
- ISO 3166 code: IN-AR
- Vehicle registration: AR

Thingbu is a settlement in Tawang district in the north-eastern state of Arunachal Pradesh, India.

== Location ==
It is located on the proposed 2,000-kilometre-long (1,200 mi) Mago-Thingbu to Vijaynagar Arunachal Pradesh Frontier Highway along the McMahon Line, alignment map of which can be seen here and here.

== Demographics ==
Thingbu is a small village occupied by the Monpa tribe and consists of 58 households.

== Culture ==
Main festivals: Losar, Gandan Ngamchod etc.

Religion: Buddhist.

Dress: Traditional Shinka, Totung, Tenga-kime, Khichin, etc. ( for women). Khanjar, Chhuba, Totung, etc. (for men)

== Climate ==
Heavy snowfall occurs during the months of December, January and February.

== Transport ==
Tawang-Mago-Chuna-Tulung La Road (TMCTL Road) as part of Arunachal Frontier Highway, rises from Tawang (6,000 ft) to Thingbu HQ and Mago in the east, and Chuna and Tulung La (17,000 ft, with a memorial of India's 4 Assam Rifles soldiers killed n Ambush by China in October India October 1975) further northeast, was turned into black-topped motorable road in 2025. Earlier it was a narrow mule track.

== See also ==
- North-East Frontier Agency
- List of people from Arunachal Pradesh
- Religion in Arunachal Pradesh
- Cuisine of Arunachal Pradesh
- List of institutions of higher education in Arunachal Pradesh
