= Lhau =

Village in Arunachal Pradesh, India

Coordinates: 27°34′N 91°57′E

Lhau is a village near Tawang town in Tawang district of Arunachal Pradesh
