= Jorra, Tibet =

Jorra Township 觉拉乡
- Township
- Location in Tibet
- Coordinates: 28°12′28″N 92°21′56″E
- Country: People's Republic of China
- Autonomous region: Tibet
- Prefecture-level city: Shannan
- County: Tsona (Cona)
- Time zone: UTC+8 (China Standard)

Jorra (Tibetan: སྦྱོར་ར་) is a township in Tsona County (Cona County) in the southeast of the Tibet Autonomous Region.

== See also ==
- List of township-level divisions of the Tibet Autonomous Region
