= Bum La Pass =

Border pass between Arunachal Pradesh and Tibet

- 邦拉山口
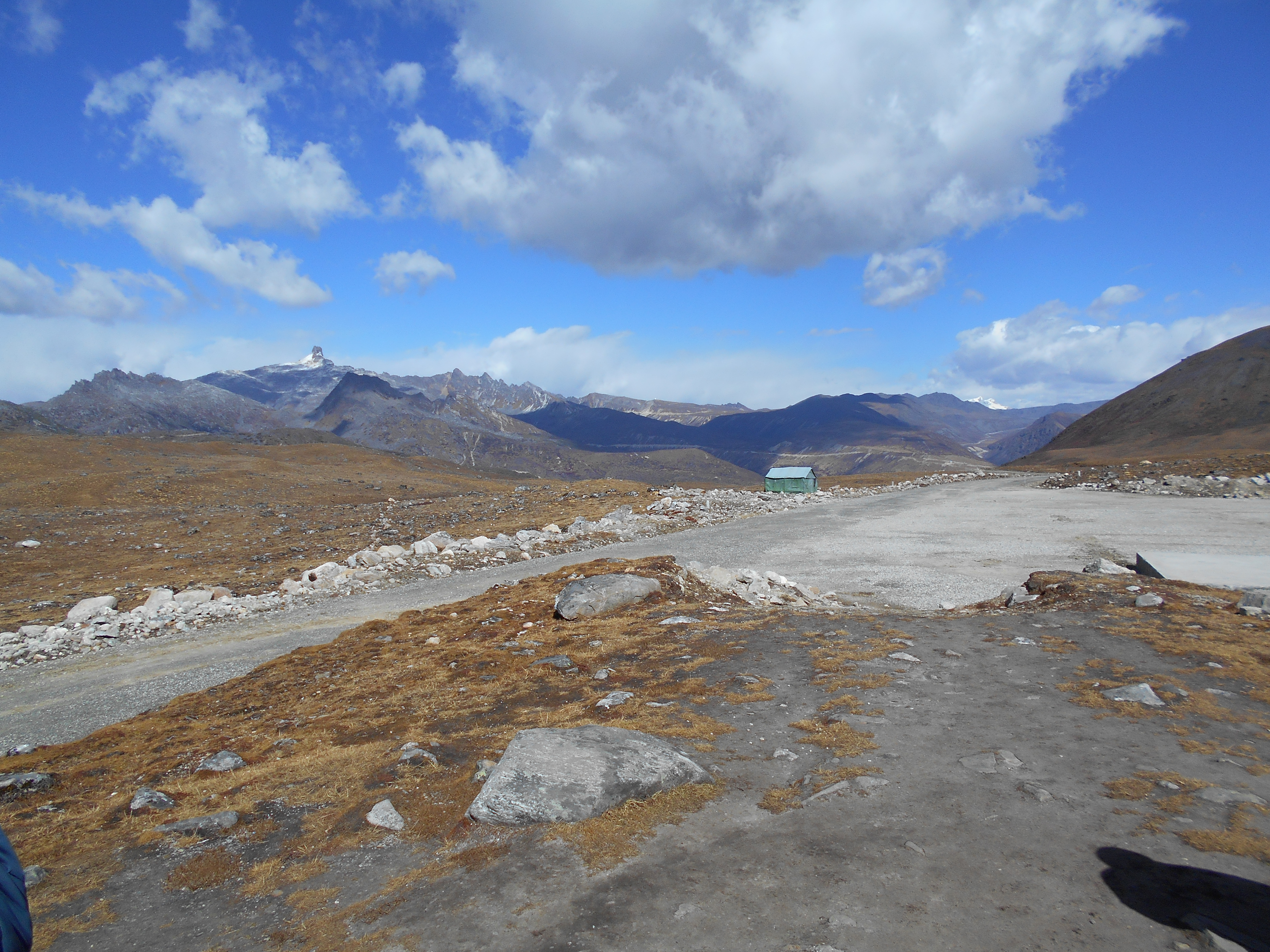
- Border Personnel Meeting Point at the Bumla Pass

- Location within Arunachal Pradesh Location within Tibet
- Elevation: 15,200 feet (4,600 m)

Location
- Location: Tsona County, Tibet, China - Tawang, Arunachal Pradesh, India
- Range: Himalaya
- Coordinates: 27°43′25″N 91°53′30″E

The Bum La Pass (Tibetan: བུམ་ལ་) is a border pass between China's Tsona County in Tibet and India's Tawang district in Arunachal Pradesh. It is 37 km away from the town of Tawang in India's Tawang district and 43 km from the town of Tsona Dzong in China's Tsona County. The pass currently serves as a trading point between Arunachal Pradesh and Tibet. It is also an agreed Border Personnel Meeting Point for the security forces of China and India.

== Location ==
An old traders road went from Tawang via Milakatong La Pass ("La" in the Tibetan Language means "pass") to Bum La Pass and finally to Tsona Dzong in Tibet.

== History ==
=== 1962 Sino-Indian War ===
The road to Bum La is also a historical route, the People's Liberation Army of China invaded India during the 1962 Sino-Indian War. Here in Bum La Pass one of the fiercest battles, the Battle of Bum La Pass, took place in the 1962 Sino-Indian War.

=== Opening of Trade Route in 2006 ===
In 2006, Bumla pass was re-opened to traders for the first time in 44 years. Traders from both sides of the pass were permitted to enter each other's territories, in addition to postal workers from each country.

== Climate ==
It is often covered with heavy snow throughout the year. It is one of the most off-beat passes in the world.

== Tourism ==
Visits by civilian tourists to Bum La Pass require a special permit, which can be obtained from the Office of the Deputy Commissioner in Tawang. The route to the pass is a high-altitude mountain road; the Tawang district administration advises that travel to high-altitude areas like Bum La should be avoided during heavy snowfall or adverse weather, and that vehicles should be equipped with non-skid chains on snow-covered roads. Individuals susceptible to high-altitude sickness are also advised to avoid visiting the pass.

Bum La is part of the Bharat Ranbhoomi Darshan initiative of the Indian Military which will boost border tourism, patriotism, local infrastructure and economy while reversing civilian outward migration from these remote locations, it entails 77 battleground war memorials in border area including the Longewala War Memorial, Sadhewala War Memorial, Siachen base camp, Kargil, Galwan, Pangong Tso, Rezang La, Doklam, Cho La, Kibithu, etc.

== Sangetsar Tso ==
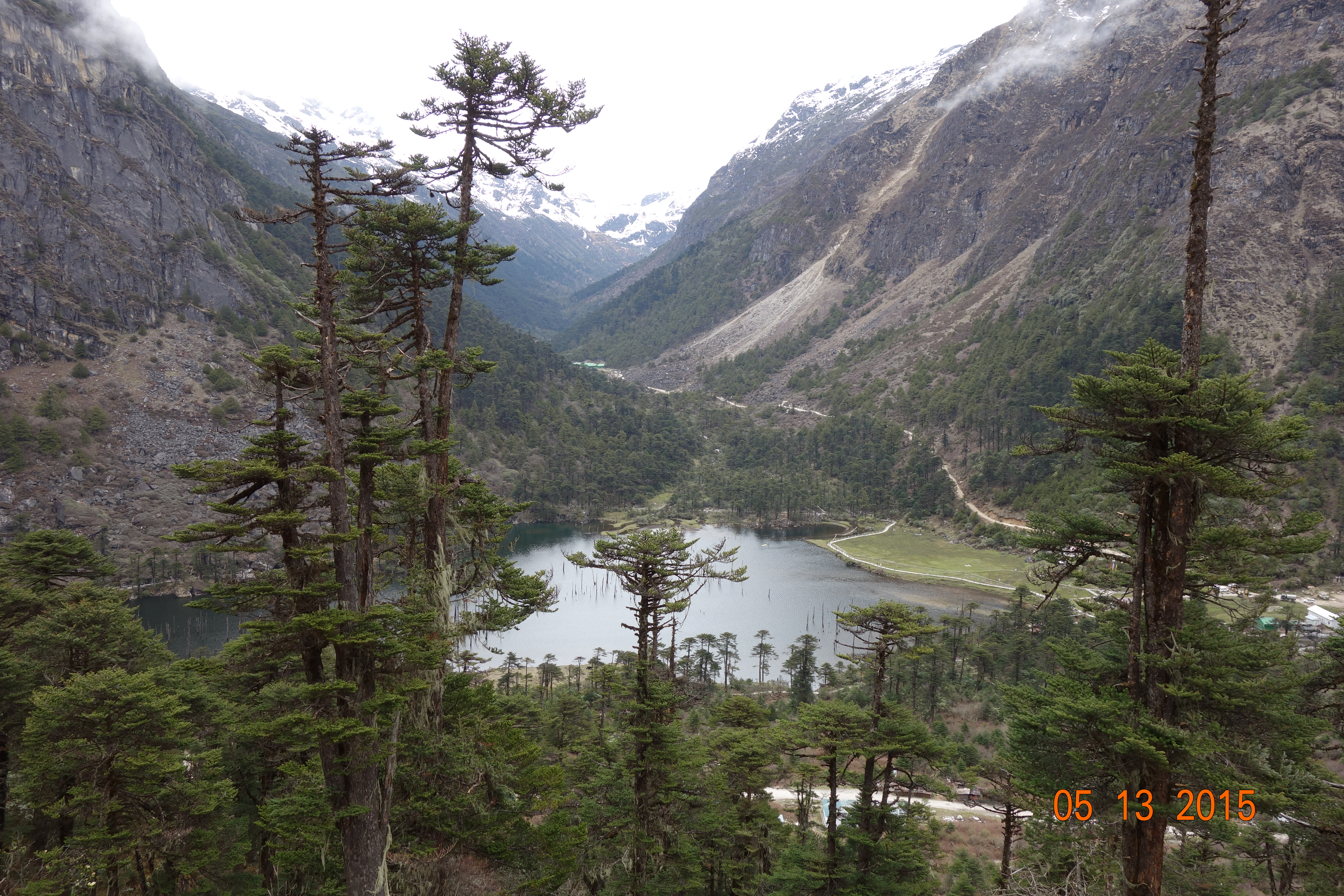
Sangetsar Tso

Created by falling rocks, boulders and trees in an earthquake, there is a Sangetsar Tso lake (lake is called Tso in Tibetan) that featured Madhuri Dixit (Bollywood actress) in the movie Koyla, as a result this lake is sometimes also called Madhuri lake. The lake is about 20 km from Tawang town, about 7 km beyond the bifurcation of road leading to Bum La Pass.

=== Heap of Stones Monument ===
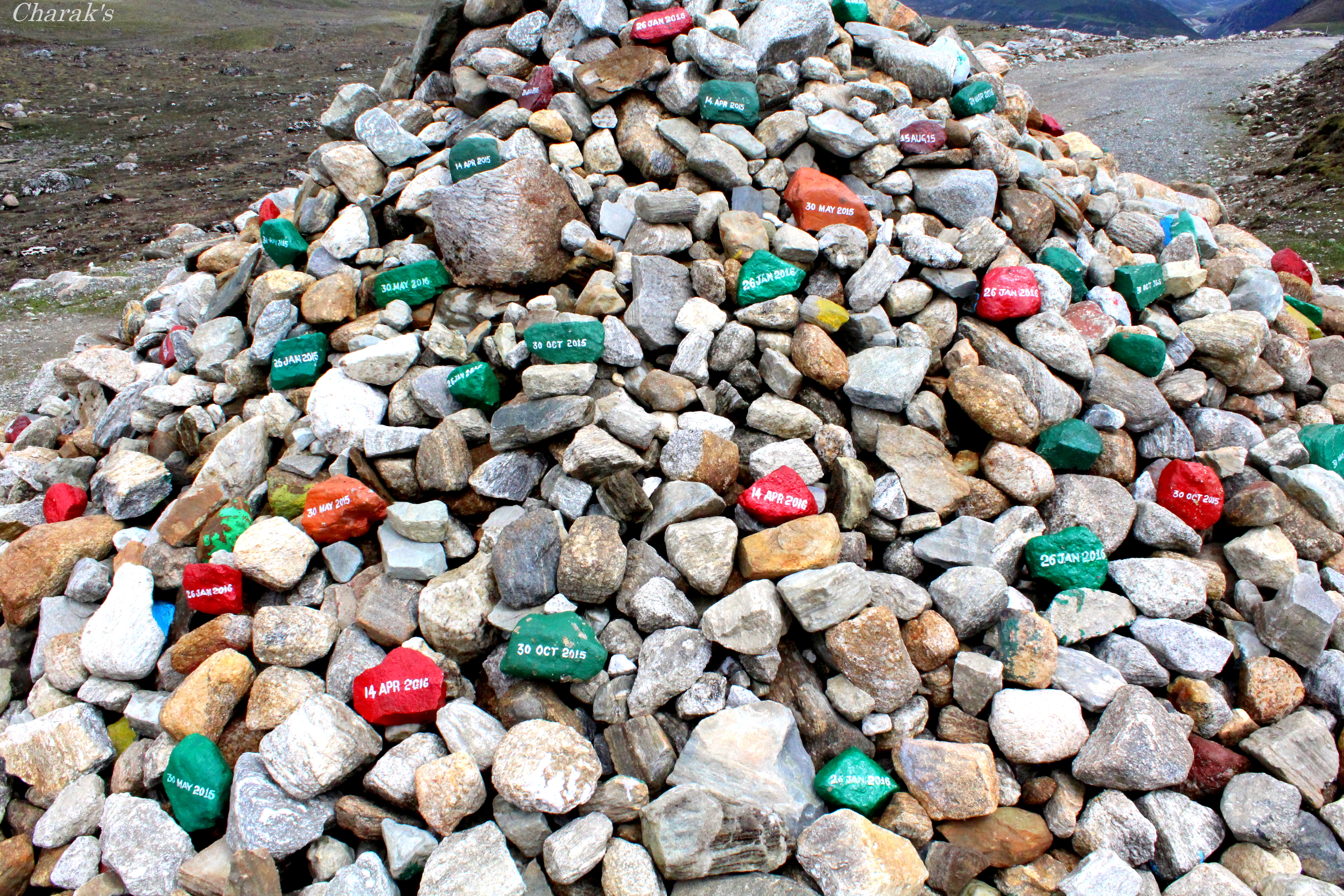
Heap of Stones monument

There is a Heap of Stones here where Indian visitors place pebbles as gratitude to the Himalayas and Indian security forces. There is a Sino-India friendship sign here.

=== Indo-China Border Personnel Meeting (BPM) point ===
It is one of the five officially agreed Border Personnel Meeting points between the Indian Army and the People's Liberation Army of China for regular consultations and interactions between the two armies to improve relations.

Here, there is a hut on the India side where border meetings are held by the rival armies.

== Permit ==
A special permit is required to visit Bum La Pass. The Permits can be requested at the Office of the Deputy Commissioner in Tawang District, and the same has to be stamped in the Indian army cantonment of Tawang. Without the army stamp, visitors will not be allowed through the numerous check posts on the way.

== See also ==
- Chumi Gyatse Falls
- Tawang Monastery
- Tawang district
- 2022 Yangtse clash
