= Mago, Tawang =

Mago
- Village
- Location in Arunachal Pradesh, India Mago (India)
- Coordinates: 27°41′16″N 92°12′29″E
- Country: India
- State: Arunachal Pradesh
- District: Tawang
- Elevation: 3,585 m (11,762 ft)

Languages
  - Official: English
- Time zone: UTC+05:30 (IST)
- ISO 3166 code: IN-AR
- Vehicle registration: AR

Mago is a village in Thingbu Circle of Tawang district in the north-eastern state of Arunachal Pradesh, India. It is located at an elevation of 3,520 m (11,500 ft), near the confluence of Goshu Chu and Dungma Chu rivers, which combine to form a river named Mago Chu, a source stream of Tawang Chu. Mago lies 85 km from Tawang and 59 km from Jang, in the eastern part of Tawang district, which is otherwise relatively uninhabited due to its high elevation.

== Demography ==
Mago has a population of 486 people living in 75 households, in the 2011 census. The inhabitants belong to the Monpa community, primarily engaged in yak herding. During the summer, these herders move further up into the mountain pastures to graze their yaks. The village is home to over 1,000 yaks. In June and July, the region also sees the growth of caterpillar fungus (Keeda Jadi), which is highly valued in traditional Chinese medicine as an aphrodisiac.

== Amenities ==
Mago has a hydropower plant and an Airtel mobile tower.

== Tourism ==
The village's main attractions are its two perennial hot water springs. Accommodations include state government guest rooms and home stays.

== Transport ==
Mago is connected via road to the Tawang Town and the Aunachal Frontier Highway at Jang. The road continues on to Chuna, a campground higher up in the Goshu Chu valley, and to Tulung La on the border with China. The strategic border road was upgraded from an earlier mule track.

== See also ==
- North-East Frontier Agency
- List of people from Arunachal Pradesh
- Religion in Arunachal Pradesh
- Cuisine of Arunachal Pradesh
- List of institutions of higher education in Arunachal Pradesh
