= Chumi Gyatse Falls =

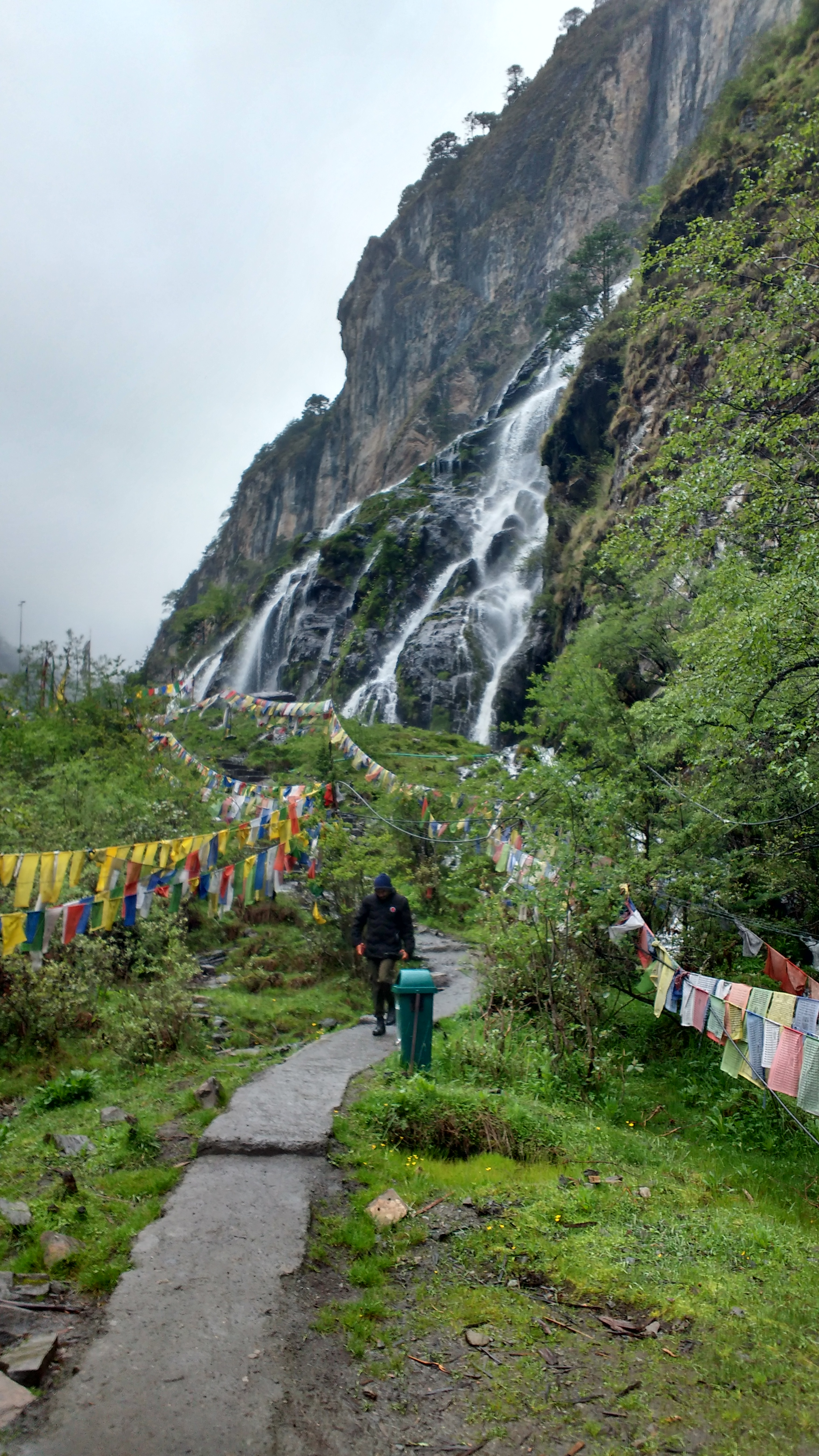

- Location within Arunachal Pradesh
- Location: Tawang, Arunachal Pradesh, India
- Coordinates: 27°46′34″N 91°58′58″E

Chumi Gyatse Falls (Note: Alternative spellings: Chumig Gyatse and Chumik Gyatse.) (Tibetan: ཆུ་མིག་བརྒྱ་རྩ, Wylie: chu mig brgya rtsa, THL: chu mik gya tsa), called Domtsang and Dongzhang (东章瀑布) waterfalls in Tibetan and Chinese languages respectively, are a collection of waterfalls in the Tawang district in Arunachal Pradesh, India, close to the border with the Tibet region of China. According to the local Buddhist tradition, the 108 holly water falls which originate from in-between the mountains symbolise the blessings of Guru Padmasambhava. The Chumi Gyatse Falls are close to the Line of Actual Control, the de facto border between China and India, just 250 metres away according to one account. (Note: Map measurements indicate a distance of 500 metres.)

Padmasambhava had stayed in Domtsang region for five days, and it is one of the seven regions in Mon to have been blessed by him. Domtsang was one of the three most sacred sites of Shar Lawog Yulsum (eastern Tawang). However, no ancient township nor any monastery remain intact today.

== Geography ==
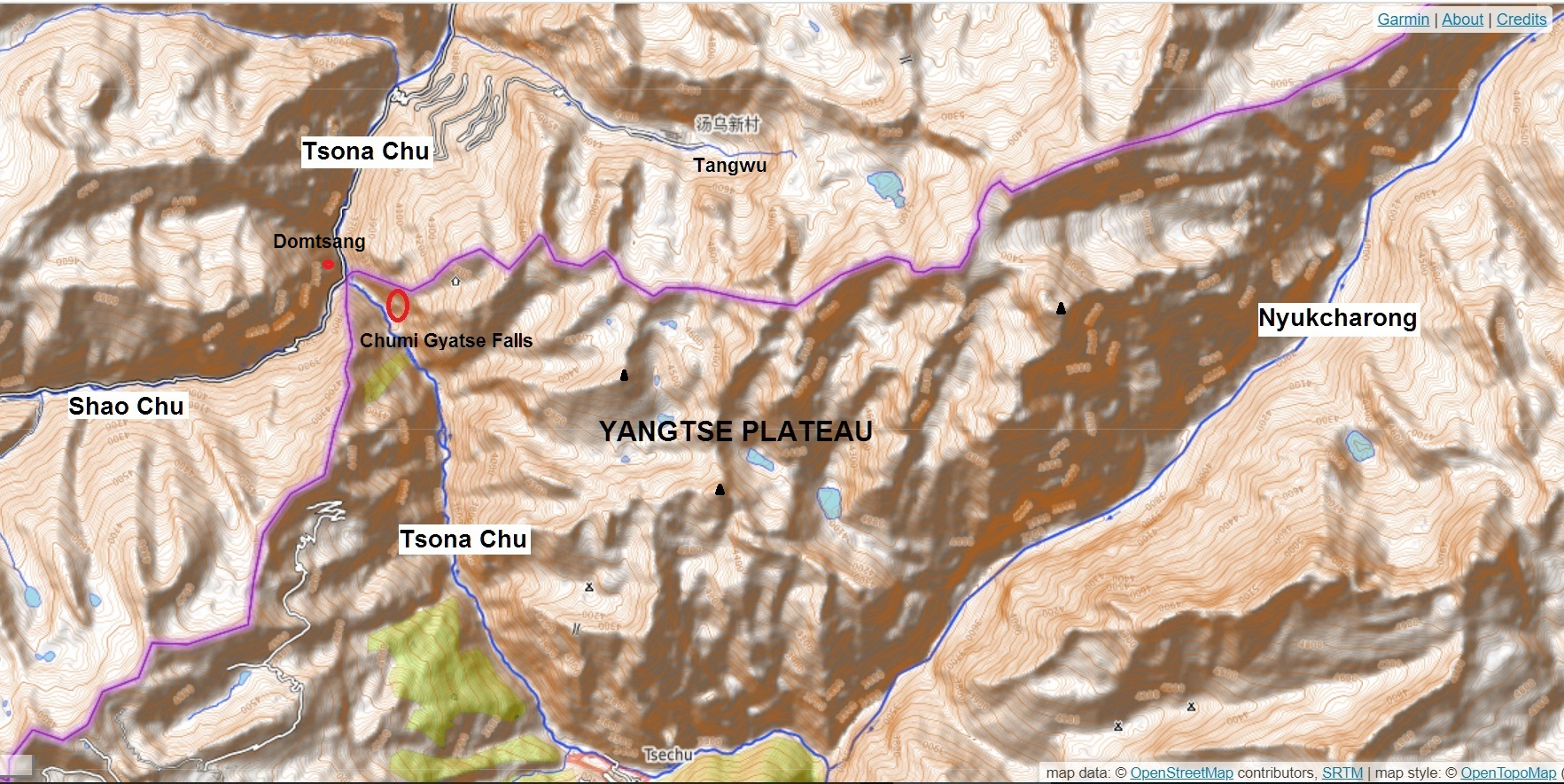
Map 1: Yangtse area

The Chumi Gyatse Falls are in an area called Yangtse (Note: Alternative spellings: Yangste, and Yangtze.) where the Tsona Chu river flows from Tibet into India's Tawang district. They are along the cliff face of a high plateau ("Yangtse plateau") formed by an east–west mountain range, whose watershed serves as the India–China border as per the McMahon Line.

The location of the McMahon Line watershed in the vicinity of Chumi Gyatse falls is open to dispute. The US Office of the Geographer draws the line in the middle of the cliff face, which would divide the falls between India and China. At present the Line of Actual Control between the two countries puts all of Chumi Gyatse falls within Indian territory. (Maps 1 and 2)

To the south of the waterfalls, Tsona Chu is joined by another river called Nyukcharong which rises from within the Yangtse plateau. A village called Tsechu (27.7229°N 92.0149°E) lies near the confluence of the two rivers, marking the southern terminus of the Yangtse region.

A few hundred meters to the north of the falls, on the opposite side of the Tsona Chu valley, lies Domtsang (Tibetan: དོམ་ཚང, Wylie: dom tshang) or Dongzhang (Chinese: 东章; pinyin: Dōng zhāng) (27°46′49″N 91°58′37″E), a Buddhist meditation site associated with Guru Padmasambhava. Domtsang was evidently an important locale during the historical period so as to lend its name to the river and valley below it, as "Domtsangrong". China continues to use the names "Dongzhang river" and "Dongzhang waterfalls". Domtsang lies in undisputed Chinese territory, to the north of the McMahon Line.

== Buddhist legends ==
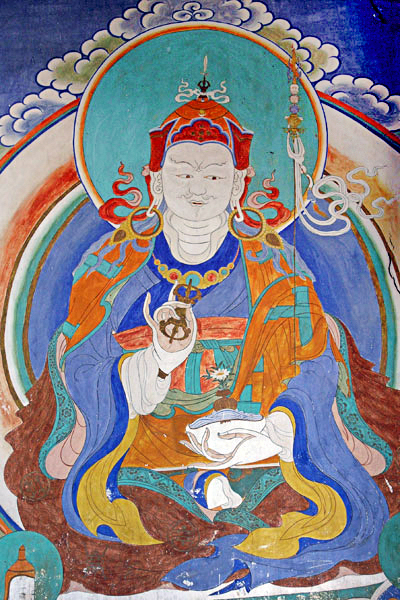
A mural of Padmasambhava from Bhutan

=== Domtsang region ===
The earliest mention of the place is in Padma bka’ thang, a fourteenth century mythography of Padmasambhava by Orgyen Lingpa; Padmasambhava stayed in Domtsang for five days, and it was one of the seven regions in Mon to have been blessed by him. Since then, Domtsang has been associated with meditation in a spectrum of Buddhist literature.

The texts Deb ther sngon po (1476) and Mkhas pa’i dga’ston (1564) record that Düsum Khyenpa, the first Karmapa Lama (1110–1193) meditated at Domtsang. Lha btsun rin chen rnam rgyal's early-16th-century biography of Tsangnyön Heruka (1452–1507) notes that he received a vision of Cakrasaṃvara upon being chased by a phantom boar during meditation in Domtsang. One of Heruka's disciples, rGod tshang ras chen, spent time at Domtsang while practising tummo. In late 16th c., Don Grub, the ruler of Mon, invested himself as the patron of the "great shrine" at Domtsang.

An undated biography of Tukse Dawa Gyaltsen [c. 17th c.] records Domtsang as one of the three most sacred sites of Shar Lawog Yulsum (eastern Tawang) which was worth a day of pilgrimage. Dga’ ba’i dpal ster, a biography of Merag Lama Blo gros rgya mtsho (d. 1682) which was likely drafted in the 17th century, records one Gtsang ston Rol pa’i rdo rje (c. 15th c.) to have had found the Che mchog temple in Domtsang. (Note: Rol pa’i rdo rje does not find a mention in other extant sources. He is held to be the disciple of the 1st Dalai Lama but this is probably an exaggeration; the construction of the Mon drab monastery at Tsona, Sha’u Di khung monastery at Sha’u, and the Ar yag gdung monastery are also attributed to him.) O rgyan gling dkar chag, an 18th c. work by the 6th Dalai Lama, features Domtsang as the tactile site in a mandala of the senses.

=== Chumi Gyatse falls ===
Local oral traditions ascribe the falls to have been the product of a showdown between Padmasambhava and a Lama of the Bonpa sect. The Chumi Gyatse ("Chumig" = "water holes"; "gyatse" = rosary) falls were formed, according to the legends, when Padmasambhava flung his rosary against a rock and 108 streams gushed out from where the beads struck the rock. Monpas believe that the waters have recuperative abilities.

== History ==
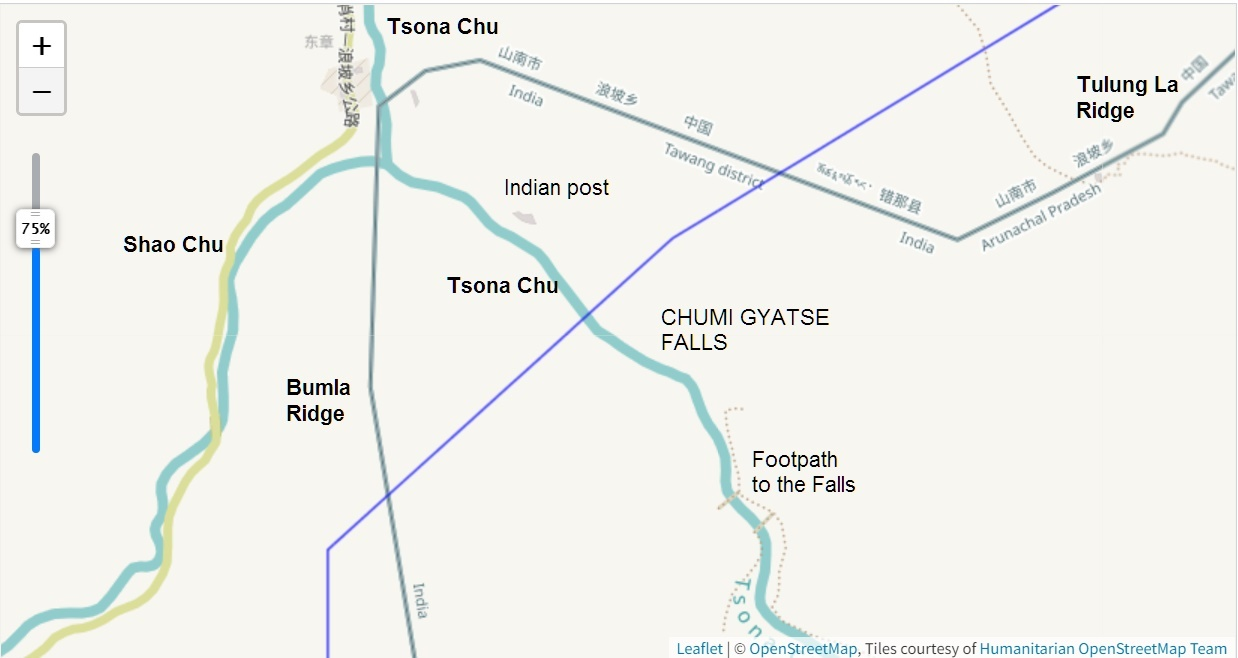
Map 2: The Line of Actual Control near the Chumi Gyatse Falls: marked by the US Office of the Geographer in 2012 (in blue) vs OpenStreetMap in 2022 (in dark green). The difference between them is believed to be the alteration made by India in 1986.

Prior to the birth of modern nation-states of India and China, Yangtse — like, most of Tawang — remained under the suzerainty of Tibet. (Note: Three major villages in Tawang elected their respective Gaon Buras who came under the nominal authority of two Dzongpons from the neighboring Tsona County.) In February 1951, India wrested control of Tawang in a peaceful transfer of power. (Note: In 1944, J. P. Mills had taken control of the part of Tawang Tract that lay to the south of Sela Pass and evicted Tibetan tax-farmers. He did not venture north of the Sela Pass.) When the Chinese People's Liberation Army (PLA) invaded Tibet during the same year, it is believed to have destroyed the temple at Domtsang. (Note: China still refers to the falls as "Dongzhang Waterfalls", perhaps following the local Tibetan nomenclature.)

The region remained demilitarized until 1986 when Indian Army occupied the territory around the falls as a buffer zone in retaliation to the Chinese occupation of the Wangdung (Sumdorong Chu) pasture. In 1995, a Joint Working Group of the two countries listed both Sumdorong Chu and Yangtse among the unresolved border disputes. In 1999, the Chinese troops attempted to assert "sovereignty" over a pasture called "Dogoer" (Chinese: 多果尔草场; pinyin: Duō guǒ ěr cǎochǎng) atop the waterfalls, having organised a grazing team jointly with local shepherds. Indian troops are said to have blocked their entry and a tense face-off ensued, lasting 82 days. Chinese media reports further allege India to have demolished a wooden bridge in 2001, that was used by Tibetans to access the Falls, and even setting up a sentry post to block their entry.

== Infrastructure and tourism development ==
Beginning 2018, the state of Arunachal Pradesh has been developing the Falls as a tourism site. In July 2020, a gompa with a statue of Guru Padmasambhava was inaugurated. India proposed to China to allow Tibetan pilgrims to visit the Falls, but China has not chosen to do so. According to China, their bridge was destroyed by India in 2001 and a guard post built to stop Chinese pilgrims accessing the area.

Indian government has also strengthened the defence infrastructure in the area. New roads were constructed to ease travelling from the town of Tawang. Under the India–China Border Roads (ICBRs) project, India started to build the strategic LGG-Damteng-Yangtse Road (LDY) to the Indian post near Chumi Gyatse Falls.

== See also ==
- Bum La Pass
- 2022 Yangste clash
- Tsona County (Cona County)
- List of waterfalls
- List of waterfalls in India

== Bibliography ==
- Aris, Michael (2012). Hidden Treasures & Secret Lives. Routledge. ISBN 978-1-136-14914-6.
