= Tsona Chu =

River in eastern Tibet and Arunachal Pradesh

Tsona Chu Cona Qu
- Mouth of Tsona Chu in Arunachal Pradesh Tsona Chu (Tibet)
- Native name: མཚོ་སྣ་ཆུ (Standard Tibetan)

Location
- Country: China; India
- Region/State: Shannan, Tibet; Arunachal Pradesh
- District: Tsona County; Tawang district

Physical characteristics
- Source: Eastern Himalayas
  - location: Tsona County
  - coordinates: 28.2496°N 91.9433°E
  - elevation: 4,780 m (15,680 ft)
- 2nd source: Eastern Himalayas
  - location: Tsona County
  - coordinates: 28.2401°N 92.1094°E
  - elevation: 5,200 m (17,100 ft)
- 3rd source: Eastern Himalayas
  - location: Tsona County
  - coordinates: 28.1232°N 92.2365°E
  - elevation: 5,210 m (17,090 ft)
- Mouth: Tawang Chu
  - location: Thingbu Circle
  - coordinates: 27.622°N 92.0138°E
  - elevation: 2,310 m (7,580 ft)

Basin features
- Progression: Tawang Chu, Manas River
- River system: Brahmaputra

Tsona Chu or Cona Qu (Tibetan: མཚོ་སྣ་ཆུ, Wylie: mtsho sna chu, THL: tso na chu) is a cross-border river that originates in the Tsona County, Shannan Prefecture of the Tibet region of China and flows into the Arunachal Pradesh state of India, where it joins the Tawang Chu river. The name "Tawang Chu" applies to the combined river obtained by the merger of Tsona Chu with Mago Chu, (Note: Gyurme Dorje appears to regard Tsona Chu as the main stream of the Tawang Chu river, referring to its valley as the "Upper Tawang Valley".) the latter rising within the Tawang district in Arunachal Pradesh.

Tsona Chu enters the Tawang district near an area called Yangtse, which contains the spectacular Chumi Gyatse Falls falling from a cliff face to the east. The China–India border in this area has been disputed between the two countries since the 1990s.

== Name ==
The name Tsona Chu has been used in British era survey maps for the sections of the river on both the sides of the India–China border. It is consistent with the Tibetan convention of calling a river by a prominent place it comes from. However, the name does not appear in Tibetan sources.

Close to the border with the Tawang district, the river has been called "Domtsangrong" in traditional Buddhist literature, named after a Buddhist sacred site called Domtsang ("Dongzhang" in Chinese).

Within the Tawang district, the Tsona Chu valley has been referred to as the Yangtse Valley, named after the area of Yangtse, which contains the sacred Chumi Gyatse Falls.

== Description ==
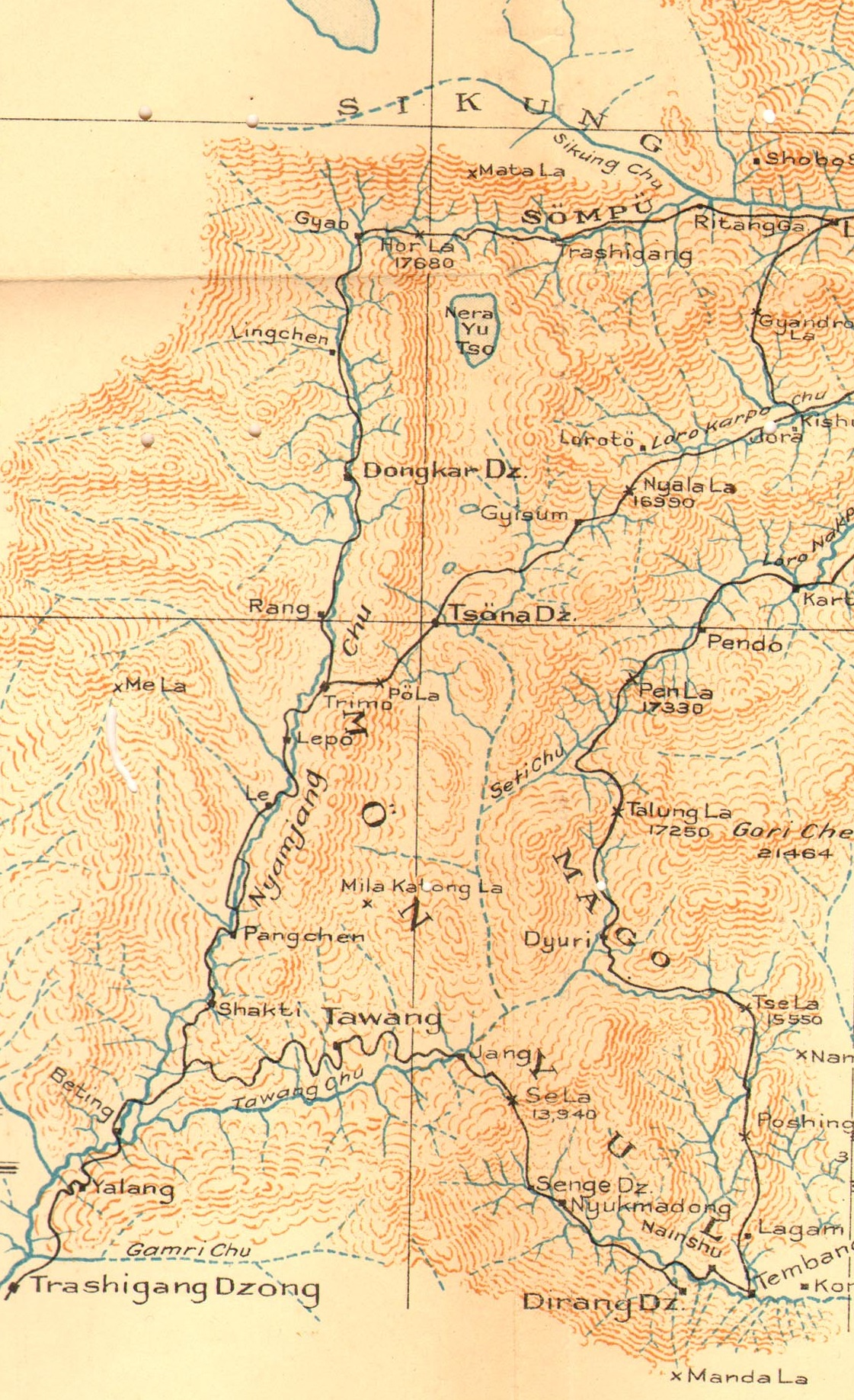
The course of Tsona Chu, shown as a dotted line (Bailey and Morshead, 1913)

Tsona Chu and Nyamjang Chu are two south-flowing rivers of the Tsona County, which drain into the Tawang Chu river in the Tawang district. Tsona Chu drains a wide area, bounded by a long north-south running Nyamjang Chu range in the west and the watershed between Tawang Chu and Subansiri basins in the east.

=== Tsona County ===
Within the Tsona County, the upper course of the Tsona Chu river is called Enjiu Chu (Chinese: 恩久曲; pinyin: Ēn jiǔ qū). It has three main sources:

- streams originating in the north from the watershed of Nye Chu (a head stream of Subansiri),
- streams originating in the west from the north-south-running Nyamjang Chu range adjacent to the Nyamjang Chu river, and
- streams originating in the east from the watershed dividing the Tsona Chu from Loro Chu (another head stream of Subansiri).

The central section of the basin, where Tsona Town lies, is an undulating plateau, where waters collect into lakes, and contribute to the river only during the summer when they overflow. The large Nara Yumtso lake is a prime example of this phenomenon.

The three streams merge near the village of Nyangdrong (Tibetan: ཉང་གྲོང, Wylie: nyang grong; Chinese: 娘中; pinyin: Niáng zhōng; 28.1003°N 92.0760°E), northeast of Tsona Town. From here, Tsona Chu flows in a south-southwest direction, collecting a number of streams that flow down from the mountain ranges to the east and west.

A tributary called Tsona Chu originates in a lake near the Tsona Town, and joins the main river, lending its name to the river itself.

A considerable tributary from the east is Seti Chu, which collects waters from Pen La, another water divider with the Subansiri basin, and the Tulung La ridge (or Yangtse ridge) to the south, which forms the border between the Tsona County (in Tibet) and Tawang district (in India).

A tributary from the west is Shao Chu (or Shyo Chu), which is formed to the south of the Tsona Town, below Kyakyen La (27.8544°N 91.8855°E). Shao Chu flows south and then east to drain into Tsona Chu just before it enters the Tawang district.

The route via Kyakyen La was used as the summer trade route between the Tawang and the Tsona towns. It had a chukhang (customs house), where traders from Tawang had to pay 10 percent customs duty. This led the British commentators to call the valley the "Chukhang Valley".

=== Tawang district ===
Inside the Tawang district, Tsona Chu passes through a region called "Yangtse" as it passes by the Tulung La mountain range to the east. The steep cliff face adjoining the valley drops down numerous thin streams of apparent spring water, forming mesmerising Chumi Gyatse Falls. Legend has it that the streams were created by Guru Padmasambhava by throwing his rosary beads on the mountain rocks.

To the south of the Tulung La range, Tsona Chu receives a tributary from the east called Nyukcharong, which collects waters from the southern side of the Tulung La range. Continuing southwards, the river reaches the east-west valley of Tawang Chu near kyelatongbo in the village of Rho. Here, the Mago Chu river joins it from the east. The combined river, named Tawang Chu, flows west and enters Bhutan shortly after passing Lumla. In Bhutan, Tawang Chu is called Gamri Chu and forms one of the source streams of the Manas River, a major tributary of Brahmaputra.

== Habitation ==
The Tsona Chu valley is mostly uninhabited. The main villages are Lampug in Tsona County and Tsechu in the Tawang district.

Several villages lie on the banks of the tributaries of Tsona Chu. The Tsona Town itself is on one such tributary.

== Bibliography ==
- Bailey, F. M. (1914). "Exploration on the Tsangpo or upper Brahmaputra". Scottish Geographical Magazine. 30 (11): 561–582. doi:10.1080/00369221408734154.
- Bailey, F. M. (1914), Report on an Exploration on the North-East Frontier, 1913, Simla: Government Monotype Press – via archive.org
- Dorje, Gyurme (1999), Footprint Tibet Handbook with Bhutan (2nd ed.), Bath: Footprint Handbooks, ISBN 0-8442-2190-2 – via archive.org
- NJC Hydropower Limited (2017), EIA study for Nyamjangchhu Hydroelectric Project (PDF), Ministry of Environment, Forest and Climate Change, Government of India
