= Tawang Chu =

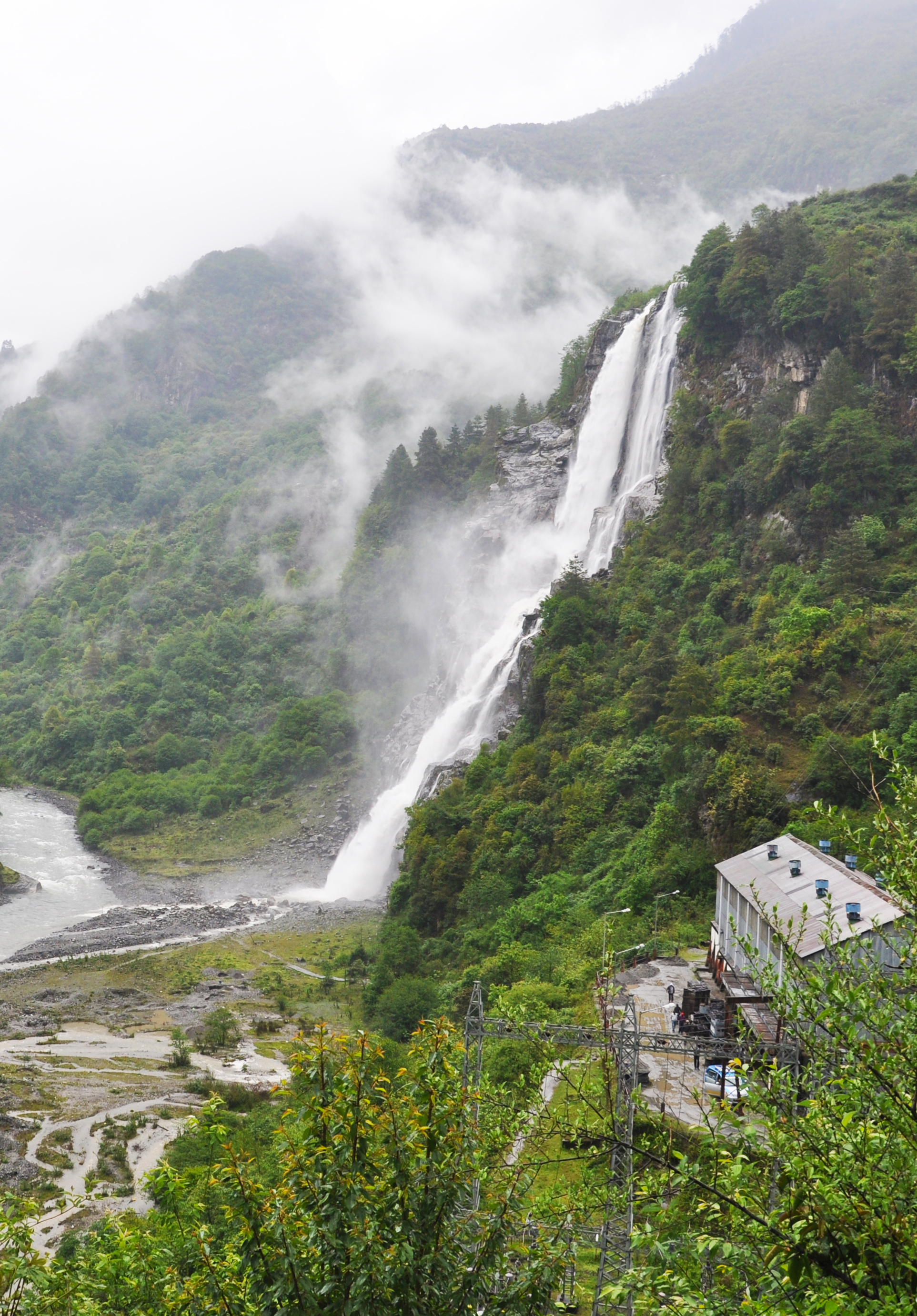
- Nuranang Falls falling into Tawang Chu

- Confluence of Tawang Chu and Kholong Chu in Bhutan Tawang Chu (Arunachal Pradesh)

Location
- Country: India; Bhutan
- District: Tawang district (Arunachal Pradesh); Trashiyangtse and Trashigang

Physical characteristics
- Source: Tsona Chu
  - location: Tsona County, Tibet
  - coordinates: 28.090°N 92.059°E
- 2nd source: Mago Chu
  - location: Tawang district, Arunachal Pradesh
  - coordinates: 27.855°N 92.283°E
  - elevation: 3,360 m (11,020 ft)
- Mouth: Kholong Chu
  - location: Duksum, Trashiyangtse District, Bhutan
  - coordinates: 27.434°N 91.574°E
  - elevation: 1,040 m (3,410 ft)

Basin features
- Progression: Drangme Chu, Manas River
- River system: Brahmaputra

Tawang Chu (Tawang river) is the main river of the Tawang district in Arunachal Pradesh, India. The entire district may be regarded as the basin of the Tawang Chu river. In addition, two south-flowing rivers from Tibet, viz., the Tsona Chu and Nyamjang Chu, join the river within the district. The combined river flows west into Bhutan, where it progresses to the Manas River (tributary of Brahmaputra River) and flows into the Assam state of India.

== Course ==
Tawang Chu is formed by the joining of three rivers originating within the Tawang district: the Goshu Chu, Dungma Chu and Gorjo Chu. These rivers merge near the village of Mago, after which the combined river is called Mago Chu. The Tsona Chu river from Tibet, which is also called Nyukcharong Chu in Tawang, joins Mago Chu near Kyelatongbo at an elevation of 2,240 metres (7,350 ft). The combined river is called Tawang Chu.

Tawang Chu flows west towards Bhutan, passing by the Tawang town on its northern flank. Near Jang, between Mago and Tawang, the Nuranang River joins Tawang Chu. Near Lumla, the Nyamjang Chu river originating in Tibet joins Tawang Chu.

Tawang Chu enters Bhutan after passing the Dudunghar Circle of the Tawang district. At Duksum, the river merges with the Kholong Chu river flowing from the north. The combined river is called Drangme Chhu, which progresses to Manas River in Assam.

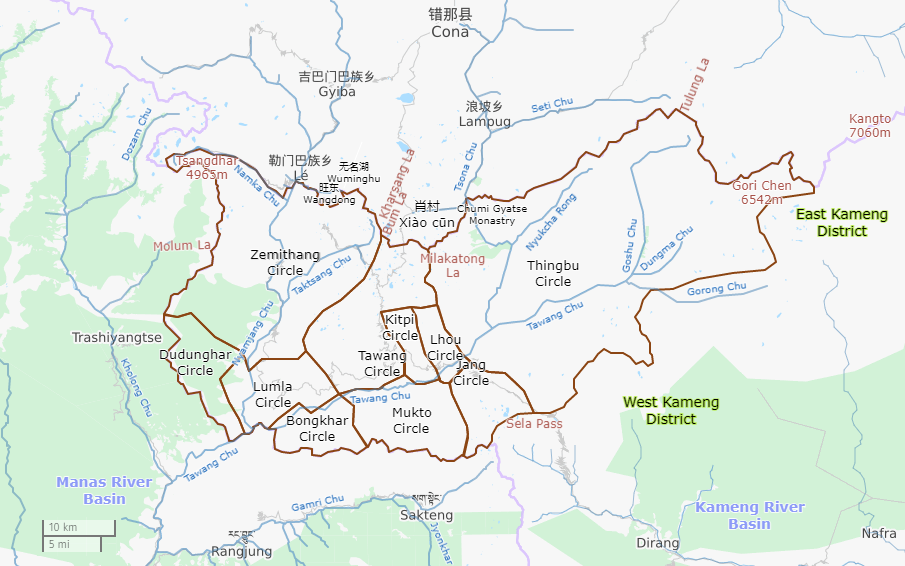
The Tawang Chu and its tributaries

== Bibliography ==
- Bailey, F. M. (1914). "Exploration on the Tsangpo or upper Brahmaputra". Scottish Geographical Magazine. 30 (11): 561–582. doi:10.1080/00369221408734154.
- NJC Hydropower Limited (2017), EIA study for Nyamjangchhu Hydroelectric Project (PDF), Ministry of Environment, Forest and Climate Change, Government of India
