= Tsona =

Tsona 错那市 • མཚོ་སྣ་གྲོང་ཁྱེར། Cona, Cuona
- County-level city
- Cona City
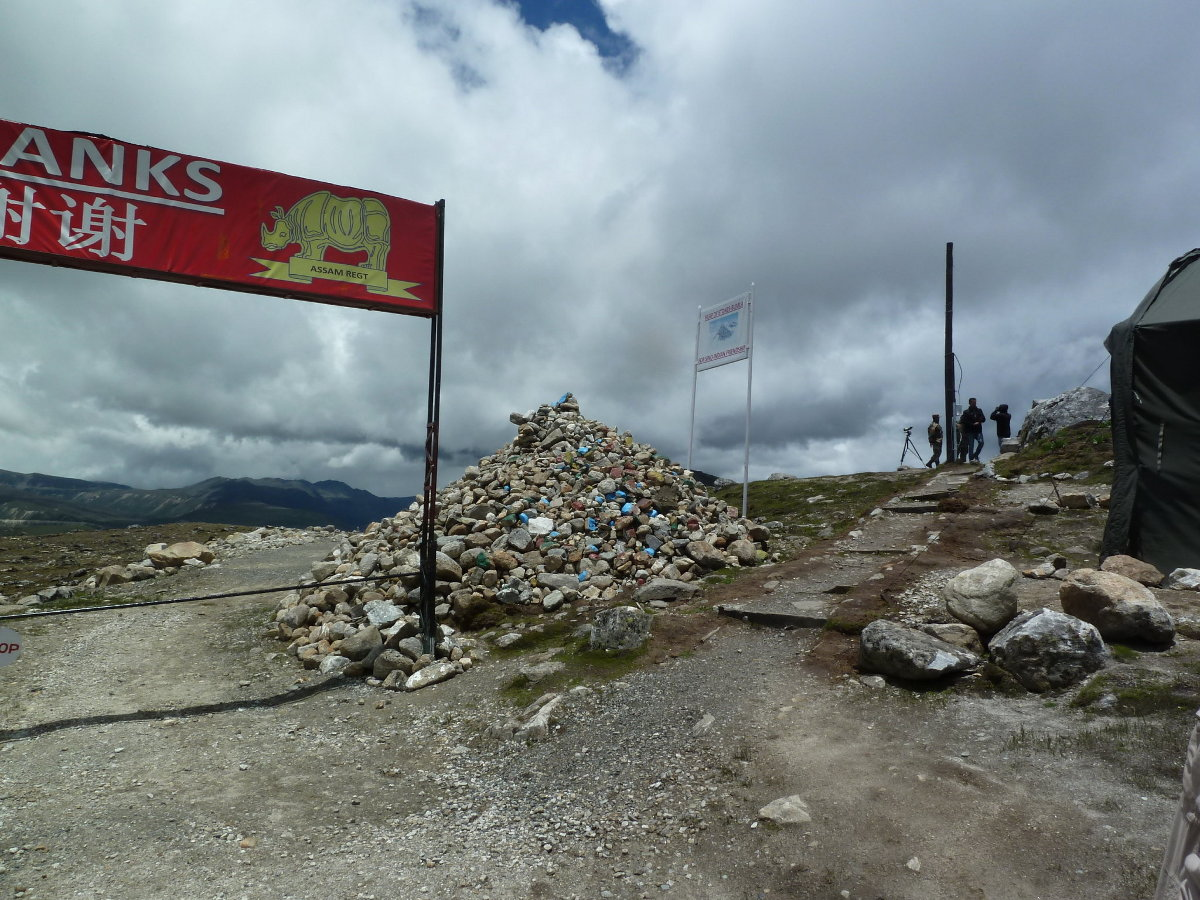
- Bum La Pass

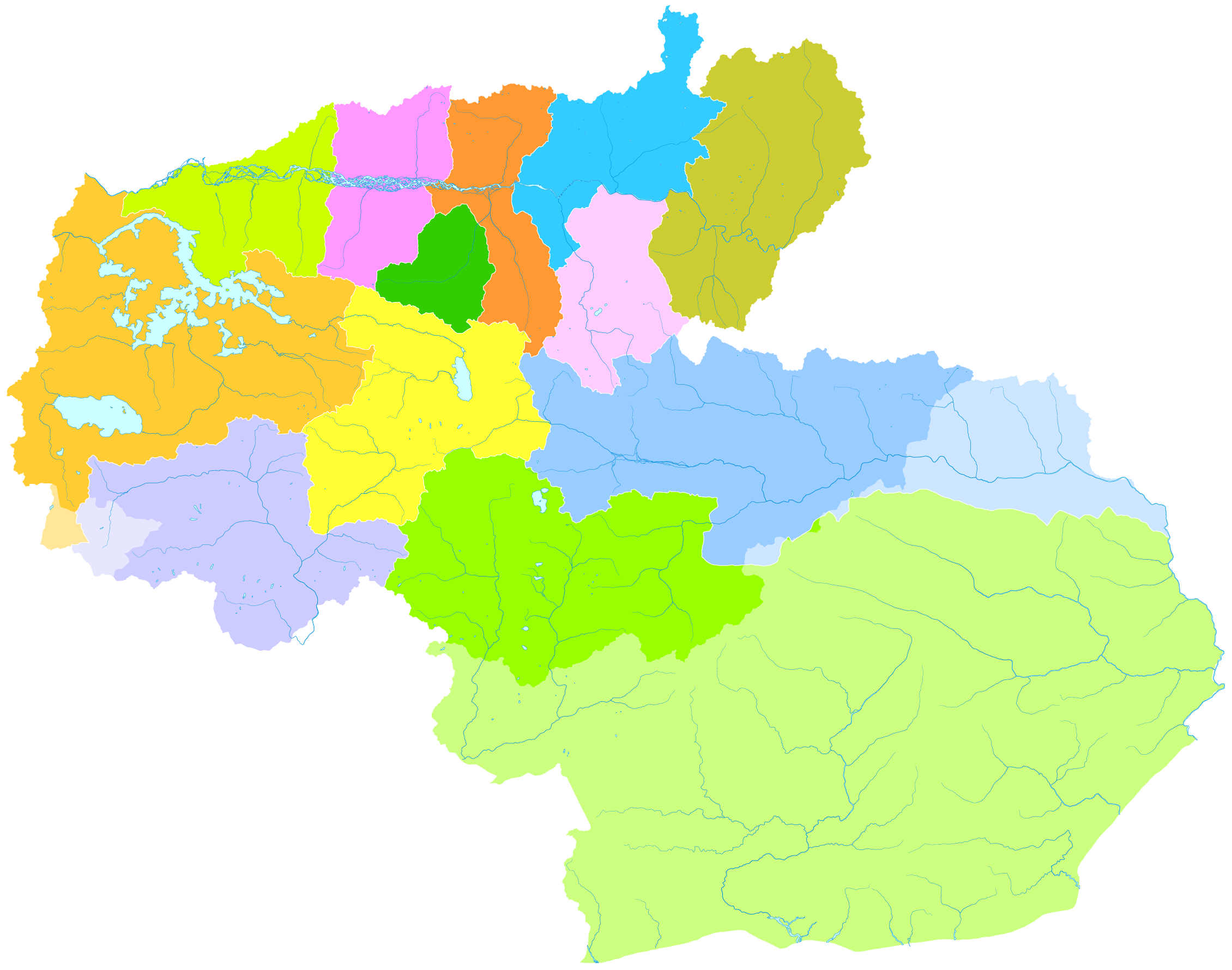
- The location of Tsona in Shannan City (green and light green below; disputed area contained)

- Location of Tsona in the Tibet A.R. Tsona (China)
- Coordinates: 27°59′19″N 91°57′31″E
- Country: China
- Autonomous region: Tibet
- Prefecture-level city: Shannan (Lhoka)
- Municipal seat: Magmang

Area (de facto controlled)
  - Total: 6,703.62 km^{2} (2,588.28 sq mi)

Population (2020)
  - Total: 13,932
  - Density: 2.0783/km^{2} (5.3827/sq mi)
- Time zone: UTC+8 (China Standard)
- Postal code: 856700
- Website: www.cuona.gov.cn

Tsona

Chinese name
- Simplified Chinese: 错那市
- Traditional Chinese: 錯那市
Transcriptions
Standard Mandarin
- Hanyu Pinyin: Cuònà Shì

Tibetan name
- Tibetan: མཚོ་སྣ་གྲོང་ཁྱེར།
Transcriptions
- Wylie: mtsho sna grong khyer
- Tibetan Pinyin: Cona Chongkyêr

Tsona City (Tibetan: མཚོ་སྣ་གྲོང་ཁྱེར།, Chinese: 错那市), formerly Tsona County, is a county-level city in Shannan Prefecture in the southeastern part of the Tibet region of China. Tsona means "The face of the [Nara Yumco] lake" in Tibetan. It lies immediately to the north of the McMahon Line agreed as the mutual border between British India and Tibet in 1914. (Note: China claims that the McMahon Line is "illegal" on the grounds that Tibet was not an independent power.) China has not accepted the 1914 border delineation, but treats it as the Line of Actual Control (LAC); for this reason, China considers Tsona city to also contain part of the disputed territory of South Tibet/Arunachal Pradesh; under China's claimed border, Tsona city would include Itanagar, the state capital of Arunachal Pradesh. Tsona also borders Bhutan in the southwest.

== History ==
In 1354, the Phagmodrupa dynasty established Tsona County (mtsho sna rdzong).

In the 17th century, sectarian rivalries developed between the Gelugpa sect that was in the ascendant in Central Tibet and the Drukpa sect that got consolidated in Bhutan. The Mera lama of the Merag-Sagteng region in present-day Bhutan, (Note: The name of the lama is given as Lodrö Gyamtso in the Tawang records.) belonging to the Gelugpa sect, was chased out of his native village by the Drukpa forces. He fled to the neighbouring Tawang region. The people of Tawang were apparently indifferent to the sectarian divisions, and the Mera lama requested help from the governor of Tsona. (Note: The name of the governor is given as Namkhadruk. He sent a subordinate called Gamo Shongwa to assist the Mera lama.) However, the Tsona forces were unable to resolve the conflict between the sects. Eventually a direct appeal to the Fifth Dalai Lama was made asking him to "annex" Tawang. According to Tawang records, an edict to this effect was issued in 1680, establishing a new Gelugpa regime in Tawang. The Mera Lama was placed in a position of authority over the region and made responsible to Tsona. Since the traditional route via Trashigang was now lost to Bhutan, a new route was developed via Dirang and the area under the Sela Pass (present day West Kameng) was brought under Tawang's control.

The Fifth Dalai Lama died two years after these events, and his reincarnation was discovered to have been born in Tawang in 1683. The family of the young boy, the next Dalai Lama, was secretly transported to Tsona, where he was raised under the watch of the Tsona dzongpöns. The family was taken to Nakartsé in 1697, after which the Desi (Regent) revealed the news of the Fifth Dalai Lama's death and his reincarnation to be installed as the Sixth Dalai Lama.

In 1912, the Tibetan government established Governorate of Lhoka (lho kha spyi khyab) in Tsedang, governing 13 Dzongs including Tsona; in 1952, it belonged to the Gyantse Sub-committee of the Chinese Communist Party; on August 29, 1956, It belongs to the Lhoka Governorate Office (山南基巧办事处); on May 5, 1959, Tsona County was established, and the county government was stationed in Tsona Town, and it belonged to the Shannan Commissioner's Office; on March 29, 1969, it belonged to the Shannan Regional Revolutionary Committee; in October 1978, it belonged to Shannan Regional Administrative Office; in February 2016, it belongs to prefecture-level Shannan City. On April 3, 2023, the county was withdrawn and established as a city, and the city government was stationed in Mama Menba ethnic township.

== Geography ==
Two main south-flowing rivers Nyamjang Chu and Tsona Chu flow through the county and enter India's Tawang district, where they join the Tawang Chu river. Between Nyamjang Chu and Tsona Chu lies an undulating plateau, with streams flowing west to east, often after collecting into lakes. Napa Yutso and Nyapa Tso are two such large lakes.

In addition, the Tsona County also contains the basins of the east-flowing rivers that form the Subansiri River. Loro Karpo Chu (the "white Loro river") in the north leads to the Jorra township. Loro Nakpo Chu (the "black Loro river") leads to the Khartak (or Kardag) township.

Tsona Dzong, the main town and the headquarters of the Tsona County, is in the plateau between Nyamjang Chu and Tsona Chu. It is 34 kilometres or 21 miles north of Bum La Pass, which marks the border with the Tawang district. Immediately to the north of Bum La is the village of Shao (Tibetan: ཤ་འུག, Wylie: sha 'ug), whose full name Shauk Tago has been associated with Guru Padmasambhava and other Buddhist preachers over centuries. The location is mentioned in these texts as being part of "Monyul" i.e., Tawang area.

The total land area of Tsona is 35,191.23 square kilometres or 13,587.41 square miles, and the actual jurisdiction area is 6,703.62 square kilometres or 2,588.28 square miles. The highest peak, Kanggeduo Mountain, is 7,060 metres or 23,163 feet above sea level. Rivers include Donggaxiong, Cuona, Luodu, Luo, Yu, etc. Lakes include Nariyong, Yang, Danba, Bila, Guwu, Gejin, Jimu, etc. The largest, Nariyong, covers an area of 58.33 square kilometres or 22.52 square miles.

== Climate ==
Typically for most of Tibet, Tsona has an alpine climate (Köppen ETH) featuring short, cool summers, freezing, dry winters, and large diurnal temperature ranges except during the rainy summer months. The annual average temperature is −0.6 °C or 30.9 °F, the average temperature in July is 7.8 °C or 46.0 °F, and the average temperature in January is −10 °C or 14 °F. Annual sunshine totals 2589 hours, the annual frost-free period is 42 days, and the annual precipitation totals 429.1 millimetres or 16.89 inches.

Climate data for Tsona, elevation 4,345 m (14,255 ft), (1991–2020 normals, extremes 1991–present)
Month	Jan	Feb	Mar	Apr	May	Jun	Jul	Aug	Sep	Oct	Nov	Dec	Year
Record high °C (°F)	14.9 (58.8)	14.2 (57.6)	13.7 (56.7)	13.2 (55.8)	16.6 (61.9)	18.2 (64.8)	18.9 (66.0)	18.2 (64.8)	16.6 (61.9)	14.9 (58.8)	14.8 (58.6)	14.8 (58.6)	18.9 (66.0)
Mean daily maximum °C (°F)	−0.3 (31.5)	0.2 (32.4)	1.9 (35.4)	5.0 (41.0)	8.6 (47.5)	12.1 (53.8)	13.1 (55.6)	12.9 (55.2)	11.5 (52.7)	7.4 (45.3)	4.5 (40.1)	2.4 (36.3)	6.6 (43.9)
Daily mean °C (°F)	−9.0 (15.8)	−7.2 (19.0)	−3.6 (25.5)	−0.1 (31.8)	3.5 (38.3)	7.3 (45.1)	8.4 (47.1)	8.1 (46.6)	6.5 (43.7)	1.5 (34.7)	−3.4 (25.9)	−6.8 (19.8)	0.4 (32.8)
Mean daily minimum °C (°F)	−17.0 (1.4)	−14.1 (6.6)	−8.4 (16.9)	−3.7 (25.3)	0.1 (32.2)	4.2 (39.6)	5.5 (41.9)	5.2 (41.4)	3.3 (37.9)	−2.7 (27.1)	−9.3 (15.3)	−14.2 (6.4)	−4.3 (24.3)
Record low °C (°F)	−33.7 (−28.7)	−32.7 (−26.9)	−24.8 (−12.6)	−17.1 (1.2)	−9.0 (15.8)	−3.1 (26.4)	−1.5 (29.3)	−1.8 (28.8)	−6.6 (20.1)	−24.8 (−12.6)	−24.7 (−12.5)	−30.2 (−22.4)	−33.7 (−28.7)
Average precipitation mm (inches)	8.9 (0.35)	12.8 (0.50)	31.2 (1.23)	48.0 (1.89)	44.4 (1.75)	48.3 (1.90)	75.8 (2.98)	79.0 (3.11)	41.2 (1.62)	32.0 (1.26)	4.6 (0.18)	2.9 (0.11)	429.1 (16.88)
Average precipitation days (≥ 0.1 mm)	6.2	9.3	16.7	20.9	21.1	23.1	25.9	26.4	21.0	10.5	3.1	2.3	186.5
Average snowy days	10.9	14.5	22.1	23.5	14.4	0.5	0.1	0.2	0.8	9.0	6.7	5.9	108.6
Average relative humidity (%)	63	69	74	78	78	80	82	82	81	74	67	60	74
Mean monthly sunshine hours	253.4	228.4	237.1	211.4	207.4	189.8	149.8	152.3	193.4	245.3	257.1	263.7	2,589.1
Percentage possible sunshine	77	72	63	55	49	46	36	38	53	70	80	82	60
Source: China Meteorological Administration

Tsona is rich in forest resources, and there are a large number of bamboo forests composed of Tsona arrow bamboo. The national first-class protected animals include Bengal tigers, leopards, snow leopards, red pandas, Tibetan wild donkeys and bisons.

== Administrative divisions ==
Tsona comprises 1 town, 5 townships and 4 ethnic townships:

Name	Chinese	Hanyu Pinyin	Tibetan	Wylie
Town
Tsona Town	错那镇	Cuònà zhèn	མཚོ་སྣ་གྲོང་རྡལ།	mtsho sna grong rdal
Townships
Kardag Township*	卡达乡	Kǎdá xiāng	མཁར་ལྟག་ཤང་།	mkhar ltag shang
Jora Township	觉拉乡	Juélā xiāng	སྦྱོར་ར་ཤང་།	sbyor ra shang
Lampug Township*	浪坡乡	Làngpō xiāng	ལམ་ཕུག་ཤང་།	lam phug shang
Quchomo Township	曲卓木乡	Qǔzhuómù xiāng	ཆུ་དྲོ་མོ་ཤང་།	chu dro mo shang
Kaqu Township (Kêqu)	库局乡	Kùjú xiāng	ཁ་ཆུ་ཤང་།	kha chu shang
Ethnic townships
Magmang Monpa Ethnic Township	麻麻门巴民族乡	Mámá Ménbā mínzúxiāng	མག་མང་མོན་པ་མི་རིགས་ཤང་།	mag mang mon pa mi rigs shang
Gomri Monpa Ethnic Township	贡日门巴民族乡	Gòngrì Ménbā mínzúxiāng	སྒོམ་རི་མོན་པ་མི་རིགས་ཤང་།	sgom ri mon pa mi rigs shang
Kyipa Monpa Ethnic Township	吉巴门巴民族乡	Jíbā Ménbā mínzúxiāng	སྐྱིད་པ་མོན་པ་མི་རིགས་ཤང་།	skyid pa mon pa mi rigs shang
Lai Monpa Ethnic Township*	勒门巴民族乡	Lè Ménbā mínzúxiāng	སླད་མོན་པ་མི་རིགས་ཤང་།	slad mon pa mi rigs shang
* includes areas claimed but currently under control of the Indian state of Arunachal Pradesh.

== Society ==
According to the seventh national census, the population is 13,932, including 12,404 Tibetans, 946 Hans, and 582 other nationalities. The urban population accounts for 20.61%, and the rural population accounts for 79.39%. Agriculture mainly produces highland barley, wheat, peas, potatoes, rapeseed, etc., with a pasture area of more than 353,000 hectares, and the main livestock are yaks, cattle, sheep and goats. In 2020, the regional GDP is 813.954 million yuan, of which the primary industry is 29.001 million yuan, the secondary industry is 429.675 million yuan, and the tertiary industry is 355.279 million yuan; fixed asset investment is 679.51 million yuan, and the total retail sales of social consumer goods is 206.501 million yuan, the per capita disposable income of rural residents is 14,007 yuan, the tax revenue is 43.9986 million yuan, and the tourism income is 37.061 million yuan.

== Bibliography ==
- Aris, Michael (2012). Hidden Treasures & Secret Lives. Routledge. ISBN 978-1-136-14914-6.
- Dorje, Gyurme (2004), Footprint Tibet Handbook with Bhutan (3rd ed.), Bath: Footprint Handbooks, ISBN 1-903471-30-3 – via archive.org
- Tenpa, Lobsang (2018), An Early History of the Mon Region (India) and its Relationship with Tibet and Bhutan, South & Inner Asian Studies/ Tibetan & Himalayan Studies, Library of Tibetan Works and Archives, ISBN 9789387023345
- Nanda, Neeru (2020), "Tawang and the Mon in their Borderlands: A Historical Overview", in M. Mayilvaganan; Nasima Khatoon; Sourina Bej (eds.), Tawang, Monpas and Tibetan Buddhism in Transition: Life and Society along the India-China Borderland, Springer Singapore, pp. 29–44, ISBN 9789811543463
- Shakabpa, Tsepon Wangchuk Deden (2009), One Hundred Thousand Moons: An Advanced Political History of Tibet, BRILL, ISBN 978-90-04-17732-1
