= Tawang district =

- District of Arunachal Pradesh
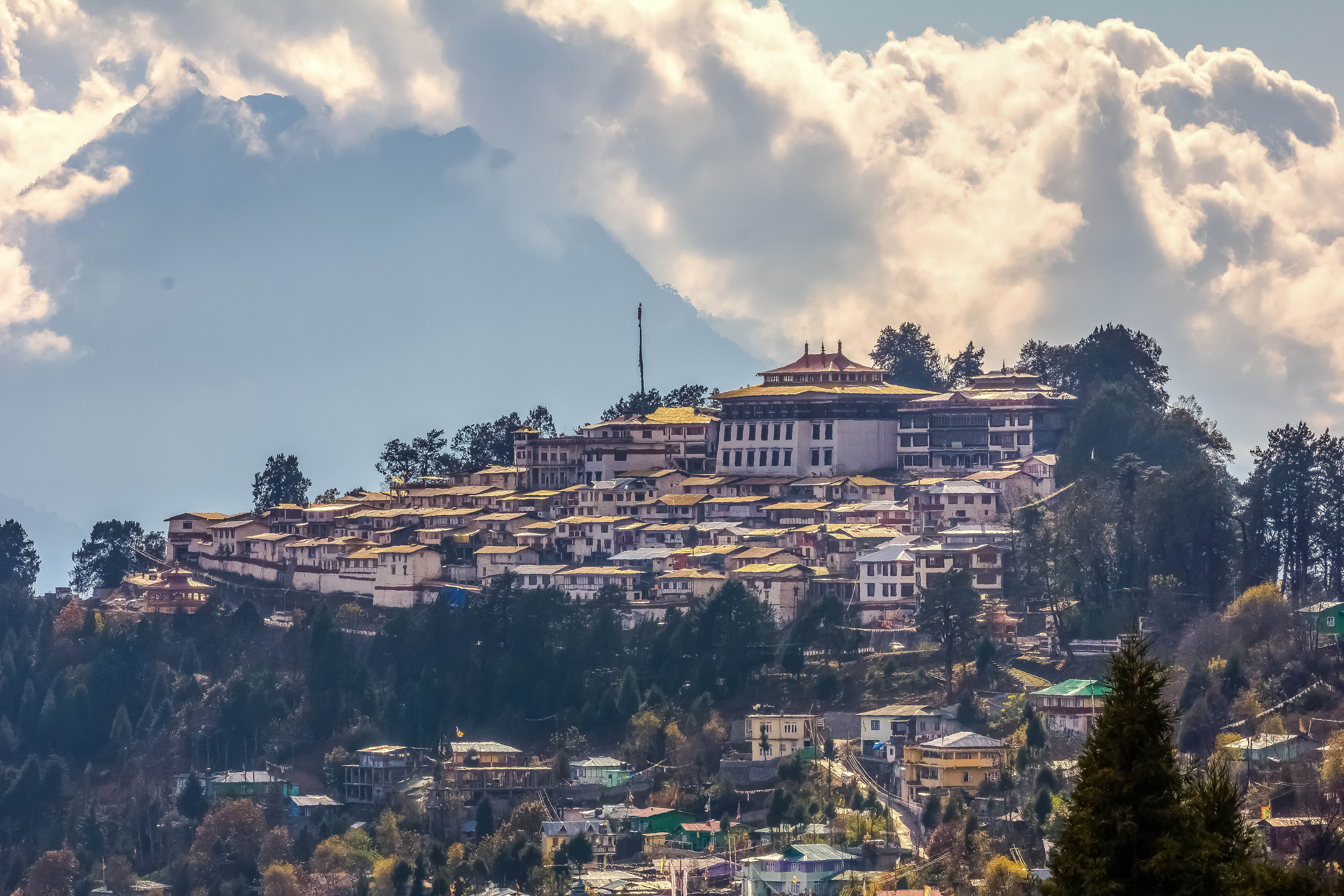
- Tawang Monastery

- Location in Arunachal Pradesh
- Coordinates (Tawang): 27°35′11.6″N 91°51′28″E
- Country: India
- State: Arunachal Pradesh
- Headquarters: Tawang

Area
  - Total: 2,085 km^{2} (805 sq mi)

Population (2011)
  - Total: 49,977
  - Density: 23.97/km^{2} (62.08/sq mi)

Demographics
  - Literacy: 60.6%
  - Sex ratio: 940
- Time zone: UTC+05:30 (IST)
- Website: tawang.nic.in

Tawang district (/tɑːˈwæŋ/ or /təˈwæŋ/) is a district of the Arunachal Pradesh state in northeastern India. It is the smallest of 26 districts of Arunachal Pradesh by land area, and has a population of 49,977 people. The district headquarters is the Tawang town with its historical monastery. The district borders the Tibet in the north, Bhutan in the west, and the West Kameng district of Arunachal Pradesh in the south.

== History ==
Historical population
Year	Pop.	±% p.a.
1961	14,807	—
1971	18,754	+2.39%
1981	21,735	+1.49%
1991	28,287	+2.67%
2001	38,924	+3.24%
2011	49,977	+2.53%

Tawang is inhabited by the Monpa people. From 500 BC to 600 AD a kingdom known as Lhomon or Monyul ruled the area. The Monyul kingdom was later absorbed into the control of neighbouring Bhutan and Tibet.

Tawang Monastery was founded by the Merak Lama Lodre Gyatso in 1681 in accordance with the wishes of the 5th Dalai Lama, Ngawang Lobsang Gyatso, and has an interesting legend surrounding its name, which means "Chosen by Horse". The sixth Dalai Lama, Tsangyang Gyatso, was born in Tawang.

Tawang was historically part of Tibet. The 1914 Simla Accord defined the McMahon Line as the new boundary between British India and Tibet. By this treaty, Tibet relinquished several hundred square miles of its territory, including Tawang, to the British, but it was not recognised by China. When Tibet was not governed by mainland China, Tawang was easily accessible to Tibetans.

In 1938, the British made a cautious move to assert sovereignty over Tawang by sending a small military column under Capt. G.S. Lightfoot to Tawang.

After the outbreak of the war with Japan in 1941, the government of Assam undertook a number of 'forward policy' measures to tighten their hold on the North East Frontier Agency (NEFA) area, which later became Arunachal Pradesh. In 1944, administrative control was extended over the area of the Tawang tract lying South of the Sela Pass when J.P. Mills set up an Assam Rifles post at Dirang Dzong. However, no steps were taken to evict the Tibetan from the area North of the pass which contained Tawang town.

Tibet lost its independence in the 1950s and was annexed into the newly established People's Republic of China. Tibet also lost its independent diplomatic freedom and Tawang was now a stress point between India and China.

During the Sino-Indian war of 1962, Tawang fell briefly under Chinese control, but China withdrew its troops at the end of the war. Tawang again came under Indian administration. Jaswant Garh War Memorial, commemorating the sacrifice of Indian soldier Jaswant Singh Rawat on 17 November 1962 during the Battle of Nuranang is south of Jang on NH-13 Trans-Arunachal Highway's Dirang-Tawang section. Nyukmadong War Memorial, commemorating sacrifice of Indian soldiers on 18 November 1962 during the Battle of Nyukmadung is 65 south of Jaswant Garh War Memorial on NH-13. Tawang War Memorial, the bigger memorial commemorating the sacrifice of 2420 Indian soldiers during the 1962 Sino-India war, is in the Tawang city.

Tawang district was formed in 1989, when it was split from West Kameng district.

The Yangtse clash of 9 December 2022 occurred at night between the troops of the Indian Army and the Chinese People's Liberation Army along the mutually contested Line of Actual Control in the Yangtse region of Tawang.

== Geography ==
Tawang district, the basin of Tawang Chu, occupies an area of 2,172 square kilometres (839 sq mi). The district is roughly located around latitude 27° 45’ N and longitude 90° 15’ E at the northwest extremity of Arunachal Pradesh. Elevations range between 6,000 and 22,000 feet (6,700 m), and inhabitants are found at lower altitude, where they enjoy a cool temperate climate.

The district was carved out of the West Kameng district, which adjoins it to the south and east. Bhutan borders Tawang to the west whereas Tibet is to the north of the district. The district occupies an area of 2,085 square kilometres and has a population of 38,924 (as of 2001), almost 75% of which are considered "tribal", i.e. belonging to the native Monpa, Bhotia, Adi, etc. The sensitivity of the border area brings Tawang a heavy military presence. In winter, Tawang frequently experiences heavy snowfall.

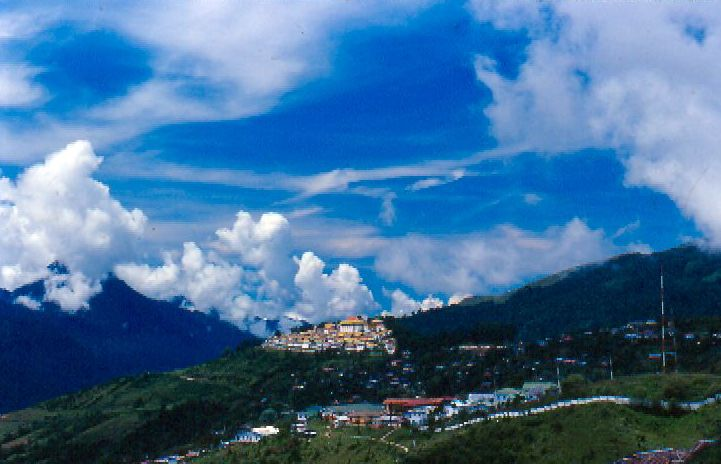
Tawang Town with monastery in background.

== Administrative divisions ==
The district is divided into 3 sub-divisions: Tawang, Lumla and Jang. Tawang sub-division is divided into 2 administrative circles: Tawang and Kitpi. Lumla sub-division is divided into 4 administrative circles: Bongkhar, Dudunghar, Lumla and Zemithang. Jang sub-division is divided into 4 administrative circles: Jang, Mukto, Thingbu and Lhou.

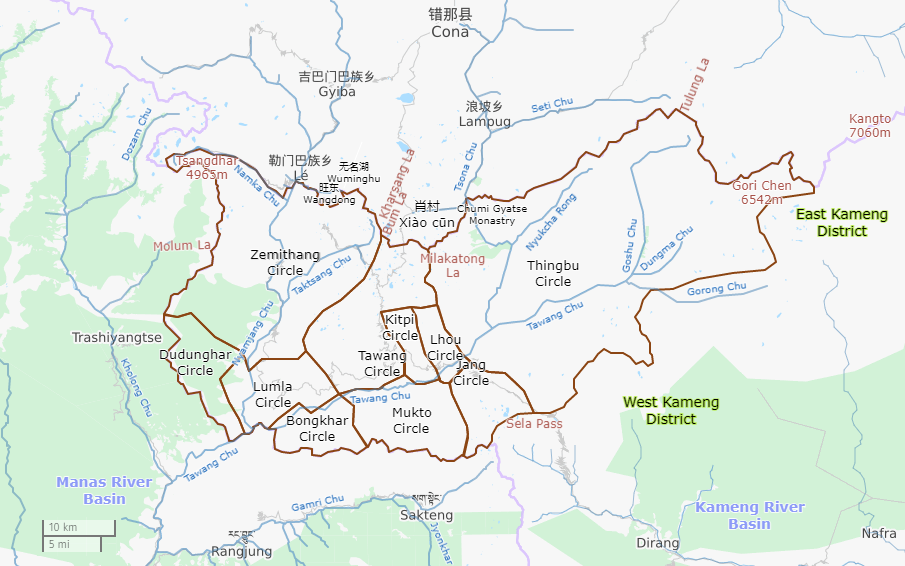
Tawang district with administrative circles

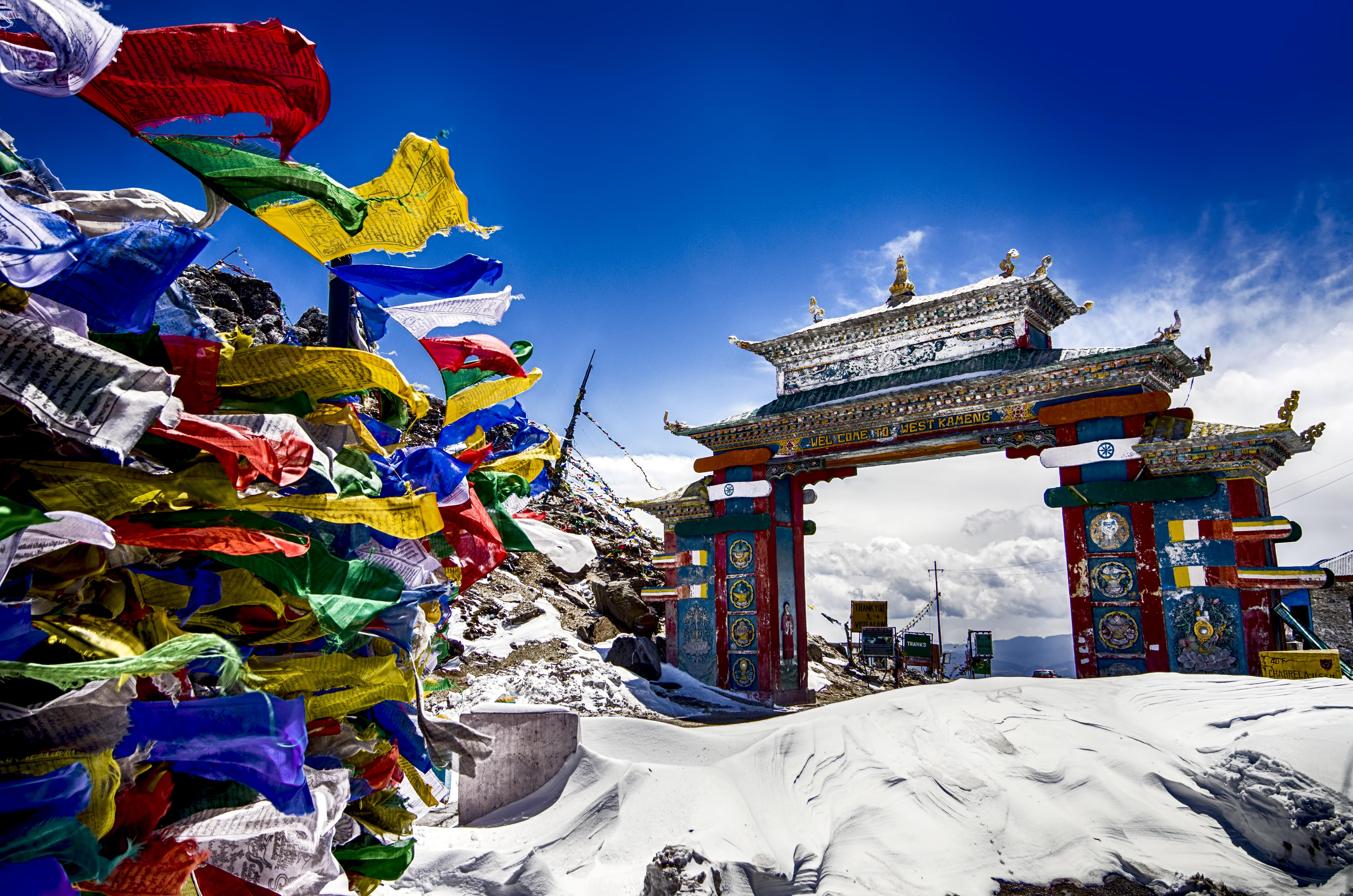
Tawang Gate with prayer flags.

There are 3 Arunachal Pradesh Legislative Assembly constituencies located in this district: Lumla, Tawang and Mukto. All of these are part of Arunachal West Lok Sabha constituency.

=== Villages ===
- Lhau

== Demographics ==
According to the 2011 census Tawang district has a population of 49,977, roughly equal to the nation of Saint Kitts and Nevis. This gives it a ranking of 633rd in India (out of a total of 640). The district has a population density of 23 inhabitants per square kilometre (60/sq mi) . Its population growth rate over the decade 2001–2011 was 28.33%. Tawang has a sex ratio of 940 females for every 1000 males, and a literacy rate of 60.61%.

=== Language ===
A sizeable population of 20,000 live in Tawang town. The dominant ethnic group are the Monpa, who inhabit all of the 163 villages. The Tibetan are also found in small scattered numbers throughout Tawang. The Takpa, a small tribal group, are found in small, scattered numbers in the West and the North.

Languages of Tawang (2011)
1. Monpa (68.7%)
2. Hindi (10.2%)
3. Nepali (7.01%)
4. Assamese (3.89%)
5. Bengali (2.45%)
6. Punjabi (2.39%)
7. Others (5.33%)

=== Religion ===
Religion in Tawang district (2011)
Religion	Percent
Buddhism	69.87%
Hinduism	23.69%
Sikhism	2.33%
Islam	1.57%
Christianity	1.55%
Others	0.97%

Most of the people, which includes the Monpa, Takpa and the Tibetans, are Tibetan Buddhist by religion. Pre-Buddhist Bön and Shamanist influence is also evident. Festivals that include Losar, Choskar, and Torgya are held annually. The Dungyur is also celebrated in every three years of the Torgya. Both the Dungyur and Torgya festivals are celebrated at the Tawang Monastery with traditional gaiety and enthusiasm.

== Transport ==
The 2,000-kilometre-long (1,200 mi) proposed Mago-Thingbu to Vijaynagar Arunachal Pradesh Frontier Highway along the McMahon Line, (will intersect with the proposed East-West Industrial Corridor Highway) and will pass through here, alignment map of which can be seen here and here.

Tawang-Mago-Chuna-Tulung La Road (TMCTL Road) as part of Arunachal Frontier Highway, which rises from Tawang (6,000 ft) to Thingbu HQ and Mago in the east, and Chuna and Tulung La (17,000 ft, with a memorial of India's 4 Assam Rifles soldiers killed n Ambush by China in October India October 1975) further northeast, was turned into black-topped motorable road in 2025. Earlier it was a narrow mule track.

== Economy ==
Most of the tribes depend on agriculture for a living. Owing to Tawang's cold climate, farmers breed yak and sheep, although in lower altitudes crops are also planted.

=== Tourism ===
Tawang is a popular tourist destination thanks to the well-preserved Tawang Monastery. The Sela Pass rises steeply and is covered with snow for most of the year. Chumi Gyatse Falls and Jang waterfall is a big tourist attraction.

Tawang district has a handicrafts centre that promotes the small-scale industries for local handicrafts.

Visitors to Tawang district require a special Inner Line Permit from the government which are available in Kolkata, Guwahati, Tezpur, and New Delhi. Most of the travel from the plains is on a steep hill road journey, crossing Sela Pass at 4,176 metres (13,701 ft). Tourists can travel to Tawang from Tezpur, Assam by road. Tezpur has direct flights from Kolkata. Guwahati, Assam, is 16 hours by road. In June 2008, a daily helicopter service from Guwahati was started by the Arunachal Pradesh government.

Road travel to Tawang from Tezpur, Assam, is by buses, private taxis and shared taxis. It is an arduous journey: most of the road is loose tarmac and gravel giving way to mud in many places. However, it is a scenic journey of nearly 12 hours, crossing Bomdila Pass 2,438 metres (8,000 feet), peaking at Sela Pass 4,176 metres (13,700 feet), Jaswant Garh and, finally, Tawang. Government buses often break down (usually on the way up) and passengers end up hitchhiking in private cars and taxis. En route, local food is available, especially meat and vegetarian momos and cream buns.

Tawang also hosted the 2nd International Tourism Mart in October 2013.

== Culture ==
=== Tawang Monastery ===
The Tawang Monastery was founded by the Mera Lama Lodre Gyatso in accordance to the wishes of the 5th Dalai Lama, Nagwang Lobsang Gyatso. The monastery belongs to the Gelugpa sect and is the largest Buddhist monastery in India. It is associated with Drepung Monastery in Lhasa. The name Tawang means Chosen Horse. It is also known by another Tibetan name, Galden Namgey Lhatse, which means a true name within a celestial paradise in a clear night.

=== Dalai Lama ===
When the current Dalai Lama (14th Dalai Lama) fled from Tibet in 1959 to escape from the Chinese army, he crossed into India on 30 March 1959 and spent some days resting at Tawang Monastery before reaching Tezpur in Assam on 18 April. As recently as 2003, the Dalai Lama said that Tawang was "actually part of Tibet". He reversed his position in 2008, acknowledging the legitimacy of the McMahon Line and the Indian claim to the region.

The Dalai Lama visited Tawang district on 8 November 2009. About 30,000 persons, including those from neighbouring Nepal and Bhutan, attended his religious discourse.
