= Rajiana =

- village
- Location in Punjab, India Rajiana (India)
- Coordinates: 30.69225°N 75.090179°E
- Country: India
- State: Punjab
- District: Moga

Government
  - Type: Panchayati raj (India)
  - Body: Gram panchayat

Population (2011)
  - Total: 8,490

Languages
  - Official: Punjabi
- Time zone: UTC+5:30 (IST)
- PIN: 142038
- Telephone code: 01636
- Vehicle registration: PB69
- Sex ratio: 1000:910 ♂/♀
- Literacy: 78.13%
- Lok Sabha constituency: Faridkot
- Vidhan Sabha constituency: Bagha Purana

Rajiana is a village of Malwa region in District Moga, Punjab. The village is divided into pattis like Vigha patti, Narang ki patti, Haveli patti, Joga Patti, Ghoga Patti, Wazir patti, Rania Patti etc. The people of the village belongs to various religions, most of them are Jatt Sikhs of Brar clan. The village has three panchayats; Rajiana, Rajiana Patti Vigha and Rajiana Khurd. There are three water works and 3 water filters in the village supplying pure water to the villagers. There is a Co-operative Society for farmers and Punjab Gramin Bank, two petrol pumps, three Government schools, three private school, Government hospital, Government veterinary hospital, Multiplex and Hotel, two playgrounds, 5 mini parks, two marriage resorts, mobile towers and all other facilities. TWO GYMS are also available. Present Sarpanch of village S Manjit singh Brar, Madho and Pargat Brar

== Location ==
This village is situated on Moga-Kotkapura highway. It takes about 30 minutes by bus from Moga and Kotkapura to reach the village. Surrounding villages are Bagha Purana, Alamwala, Rode, G.T.B. Garh, Kotla Mehar Singh Wala, Veroke, Channu wala and Budh Singh Wala.

== History ==
The background of the village belongs to Brar Jatts. Brar originated from the Bhattis of Jaisalmer, colonised this area and subsequently pushed Gills from this site towards Moga. The village is approximately 600 years old and it is named for Saint Baba Rajapir. Although the village was made by Brar Jatts, at this time people of most of the religions and clans live in the village.

Entrance of Govt. Senior Secondary School Rajiana (Moga)

== Population ==
Population of the village is about 8,490 as of figures available by 'India Census 2011'. Males constitute 52% of the population and females 48%. 10% of the population is under 9 years of age and 15% of the population is over 75 years.

== Education ==
Rajiana has a literacy rate of 78.13%, higher than the national average of 59.5%: male literacy is 82.25% and female literacy is 74.58%. Modern generation is getting higher and professional education from reputed institutes and abroad. The village has many government and private schools which play an important role in improving literacy rates in childhood. Following educational institutes are running in the village:

- Govt. Elementary School 1 (Previously named Govt. Primary School)
- Govt. Elementary School 2
- Govt. Senior Secondary School (Previously named Govt. High School)
- Khalsa Public School, Rajiana
- Guru Nanak Group of institutes, GT Road, Rajiana
- Guru Hargobind Public School, Kotla Road, Rajiana
- Sant Miha Singh Rajapir Convent Senior Secondary School, Budh Singh wala Road.

== Economy ==
Main occupation of the villagers is agriculture, main crops are wheat, rice and chaara. Day-by-day new generation is adopting new occupations such as, business, transportation, going abroad, etc.

== 2011 Census ==
Rajiana is a large village located in Bagha Purana Tehsil of Moga district, Punjab with total 1650 families residing. Village has a population of 8490 of which 4516 are males while 3974 are females as per Population Census 2011.

In Rajiana village population of children with age 0-6 is 791 which makes up 9.32% of total population of village. Average Sex Ratio of Rajiana village is 910. Child Sex Ratio for the Rajiana as per census is 861, higher than Punjab average of 846.

Literacy rate of Rajiana village is 78.13%. In Rajiana Male literacy stands at 82.25% while female literacy rate was 74.58%.

=== Caste Factor ===
In Rajiana village, Schedule Caste (SC) constitutes 38.26% of total population. The village Rajiana currently doesn't have any Schedule Tribe (ST) population.

=== Work Profile ===
In Rajiana village out of total population, 2978 were engaged in work activities. 78.98% of workers describe their work as Main Work (Employment or Earning more than 6 Months) while 21.02% were involved in Marginal activity providing livelihood for less than 6 months. Of 2978 workers engaged in Main Work, 953 were cultivators (owner or co-owner) while 506 were Agricultural labourer
