= Kotla Mehar Singh Wala =

Village in Punjab, India

- village
- Location in Punjab, India Kotla Mehar Singh Wala (India)
- Coordinates: 30.645643°N 75.071648°E
- Country: India
- State: Punjab
- District: Moga
- Founder: Mehar Singh

Government
  - Type: Panchayati raj (India)
  - Body: Gram panchayat

Area
  - Total: 4.34 km^{2} (1.68 sq mi)
- Elevation: 225 m (738 ft)

Population (2011)
  - Total: 2,689
  - Density: 620/km^{2} (1,600/sq mi)

Languages
  - Official: Punjabi
- Time zone: UTC+5:30 (IST)
- PIN: 142038
- Telephone code: 01636
- Vehicle registration: PB29, PB69
- Sex ratio: 1000:918 ♂/♀
- Literacy: 70%
- Lok Sabha constituency: Faridkot
- Vidhan Sabha constituency: Bagha Purana
- Bank: Oriental Bank of Commerce
- IFSC Code: ORBC0101747
- Website: kotlamswala.com

Kotla Mehar Singh Wala is a village of Malwa region of Punjab state. It is situated about 30 km (19 mi) from Moga. The village has five patties (divided in Patties): Babe ki patti, isawa patti, Vaddi Patti, Chhoti patti, Suhel patti etc. The people of the village belong to various religions, most of them are Sikhs of Brar clan. There are two water works in the village supplying pure water to the villagers. Streets of the village are made from concrete.

== History ==
The background of the village belongs to Brar Jatts. Brar originated from the Bhattis of Jaisalmer. Kotla Mehar Singh Wala has a literacy rate of 80%. This Village is 500 years old (approx). the founder of this village was Mehar Singh.

== Education ==
There are three Schools (two government and one private) in Kotla Mehar Singh Wala. One school offers study for grades 1 to 5, while the other two schools offer study for grades 6 to 10. Most of people in Kotla Mehar Singh Wala are well educated. Some are on government service; the main occupation is agriculture.

== Sports activities ==
Every year, a kabaddi cup is held by villagers at the local sports ground. This tournament is known world-wide. All players playing Punjabi kabaddi attend this tournament in each winter. All matches are available on YouTube.
