= Battle of Bum La Pass =

India-China armed conflict

Battle of Bum La Pass Chinese: 棒山口战斗
- Part of Battle of Kejielang
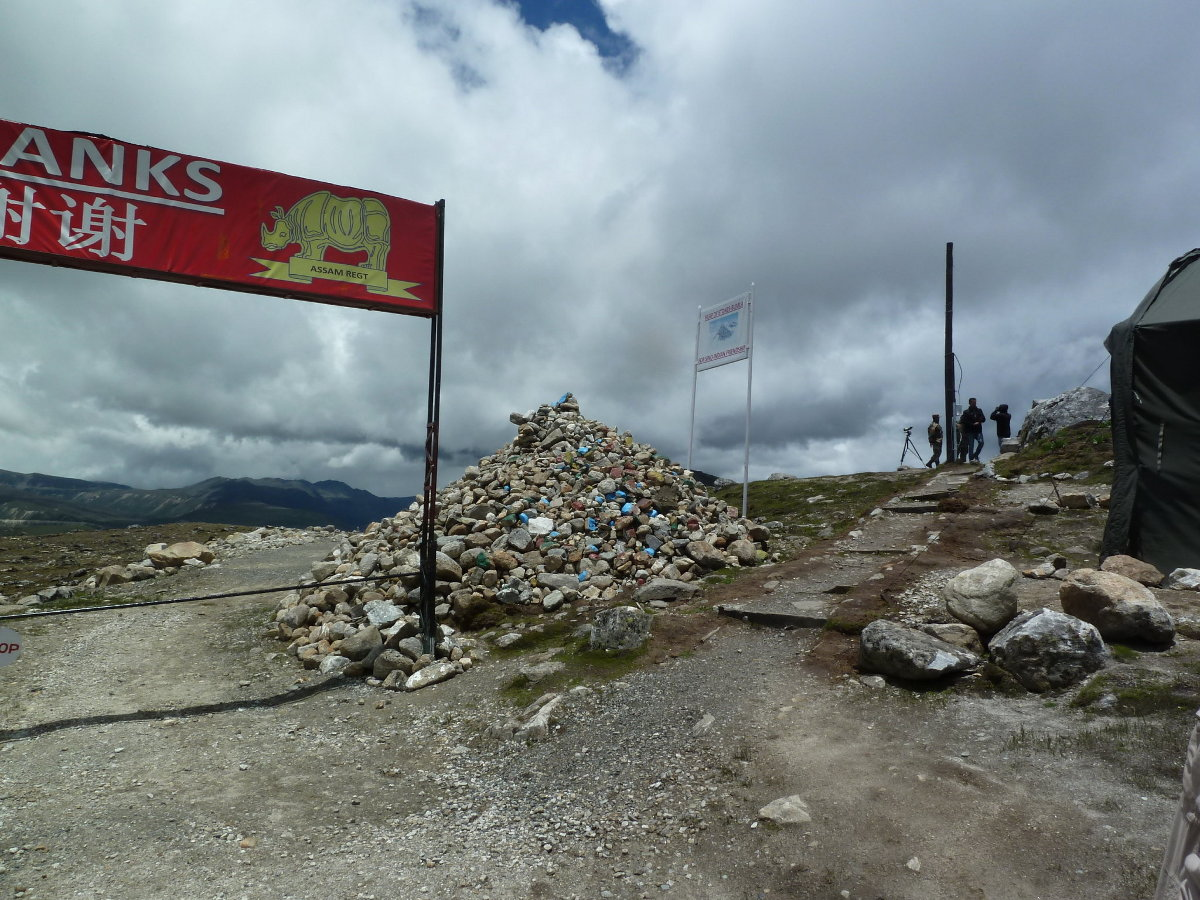
- Indo-China border at Bum La Pass in the Zemithang circle
Date	23 October 1962
Location	Bum La Pass, NEFA, India
Result	Chinese victory

Belligerents
India	China

Commanders and leaders
(India) Subedar Joginder Singh (POW)	(China) Major Xiang Zhongyi

Units involved
1 x Platoon, 5th Battalion Assam Rifles; 1 x Platoon, 1st Battalion Sikh Regiment	3rd Separate Infantry Regiment, Shannan Military Sub-district: 2nd and 3rd Rifle Companies

Strength
~40 infantry	200-300 infantry

Casualties and losses
22 killed 4 captured (Chinese source) (Note: Chinese source indicated "27 killed and 4 captured", yet it includes figures from the conflict at Asaphila, where it claimed 5 Indian killed and none captured. Therefore, the figure here is deducted from the overall figures of Bum La Pass and Asaphila combined); ~20 killed (Indian source)	Unspecified (Chinese source) (Note: Despite unspecifed, Chinese claimed 151 dead and 334 wounded in the whole campaign of Kejielang, to which Battle of Bum La Pass belongs); Over 200 killed (Indian source)

The Battle of Bum La Pass (Chinese: 棒山口战斗; pinyin: bàngshānkǒu zhàndòu), also known as Battle of Bum La, was fought on 23 October 1962 between Indian forces led by Subedar Joginder Singh and Chinese forces.

== Background ==
The main cause of the war was a dispute over the sovereignty of the widely separated Aksai Chin and Arunachal Pradesh border regions. Aksai Chin, claimed by India to belong to Ladakh and by China to be part of Xinjiang, contains an important road link that connects the Chinese regions of Tibet and Xinjiang. China's construction of this road was one of the triggers of the conflict.

== Battle ==
The Chinese forces attacked the Indian positions at Bum La Pass on 23 October 1962 during their advance towards Tawang. According to the Chinese military history, the 2nd and 3rd Companies of the 3rd Separate Infantry Regiment attacked the Indian positions defended by "2 Assam platoons" and "swiftly overcame the defenders". The Chinese account provides little further detail about the course of the engagement, largely due to the fact that the battle was part of the greater campaign, Battle of Kejielang.

Indian accounts describe the engagement in greater detail, identifying a platoon of the 1st Battalion, Sikh Regiment, led by Subedar Joginder Singh, among the defenders. The Indian narrative describes successive Chinese assaults against the Sikh position. According to Kittu Reddy's account, the defenders repelled the initial assault, inflicting casualties on the attacking force. V. K. Singh's account states that Joginder requested additional ammunition from company headquarters but could not communicate with it because the telephone line had been cut.

An account of Joginder Singh's actions published by IndiaTimes, citing the Indian Army's citation, also describes a second assault that the defenders reportedly repelled. Ian Cardozo's account states that the Sikh platoon suffered mounting casualties and was nearly out of ammunition. It further describes a bayonet charge during the final stage of the fighting, after which the remaining defenders were overwhelmed. Indian accounts report that Joginder Singh was captured by Chinese forces and subsequently died in captivity.

== See also ==
- Aksai Chin
- Joginder Singh (soldier)
