= Dharampreet =

Dharampreet ਧਰਮਪ੍ਰੀਤ
- Birth name: Bhupinder Dharma
- Born: July 9, 1973; Bilaspur, Moga district, Punjab, India
- Died: June 8, 2015 (aged 41); Bathinda
- Genres: Punjabi folk and pop, Duet
- Occupation: Singer
- Years active: 1993–2015
- Labels: Payal Music, Amar Audio, Goyal Music

Dharampreet (Punjabi: ਧਰਮਪ੍ਰੀਤ) was a well-known Punjabi singer from Punjab, India, known as the "King of Punjabi Sad Songs". He started his career in 1993 with a solo album, Khatra ha Sohneya Nu. In all, he released 12 solo albums and 6 albums of duets. He committed suicide on June 8, 2015, at his residence in Bathinda.

== Early life and career ==
Dharampreet hailed from Bilaspur town near Moga in Indian Punjab. He entered the world of Punjabi music in 1993 as Bhupinder Dharma with his album Khatra Hai Sohanya Nu that was released by Payal Music Company. Later his album, Dil Naal Khed'di Rahi, released by Goyal Music Company in 1997, made him a star overnight. This album sold over 2.3 million copies. His later albums, Ajj Sada Dil Torh ta, Aina Kade Vi Nahi Roya and Parh Satgur Di Bani (religious) made a lot of profit for music companies. He gave many hit songs with

== Discography ==
Until 2013 he released many albums including solos and duets with Sudesh Kumari and Miss Pooja. His first album Khatra hai Sohenya nu [1993] released under the Name Bhupinder Dharma but After that he change his media name Dharampreet.

- Khatra Hai Sohanya Nu [1993]
- Dil Naal Khed'di Rahi [1997]
- Ajj Sada Dil Torh ta [1998]
- Tutte Dil Nahi Jurhde [2000]
- Darr Lagda Vichhran Ton [2001]
- Aina Kade Vi Nahi Roya
- Dil Kise Hor Da
- Saun Dian Jharhian (Duet) [2006]
- Tutiya tdhak kar Ke (Duet) [2006]
- Desi Masti (Duet) [2008]
- Class Fellow (Duet) [2010]
- Emotions of heart [2012]

Religious

- Parh Satgur Di Bani [1999]
- Je Rabb Milje [2000]

== See also ==
- Gurdas Maan
- Balkar Sidhu
- Miss Pooja
- Major Rajasthani
