= Sangetsar Tso =

Lake in Arunachal Pradesh, India

Sangetsar Tso Shonga-tser Lake
- Madhuri Lake
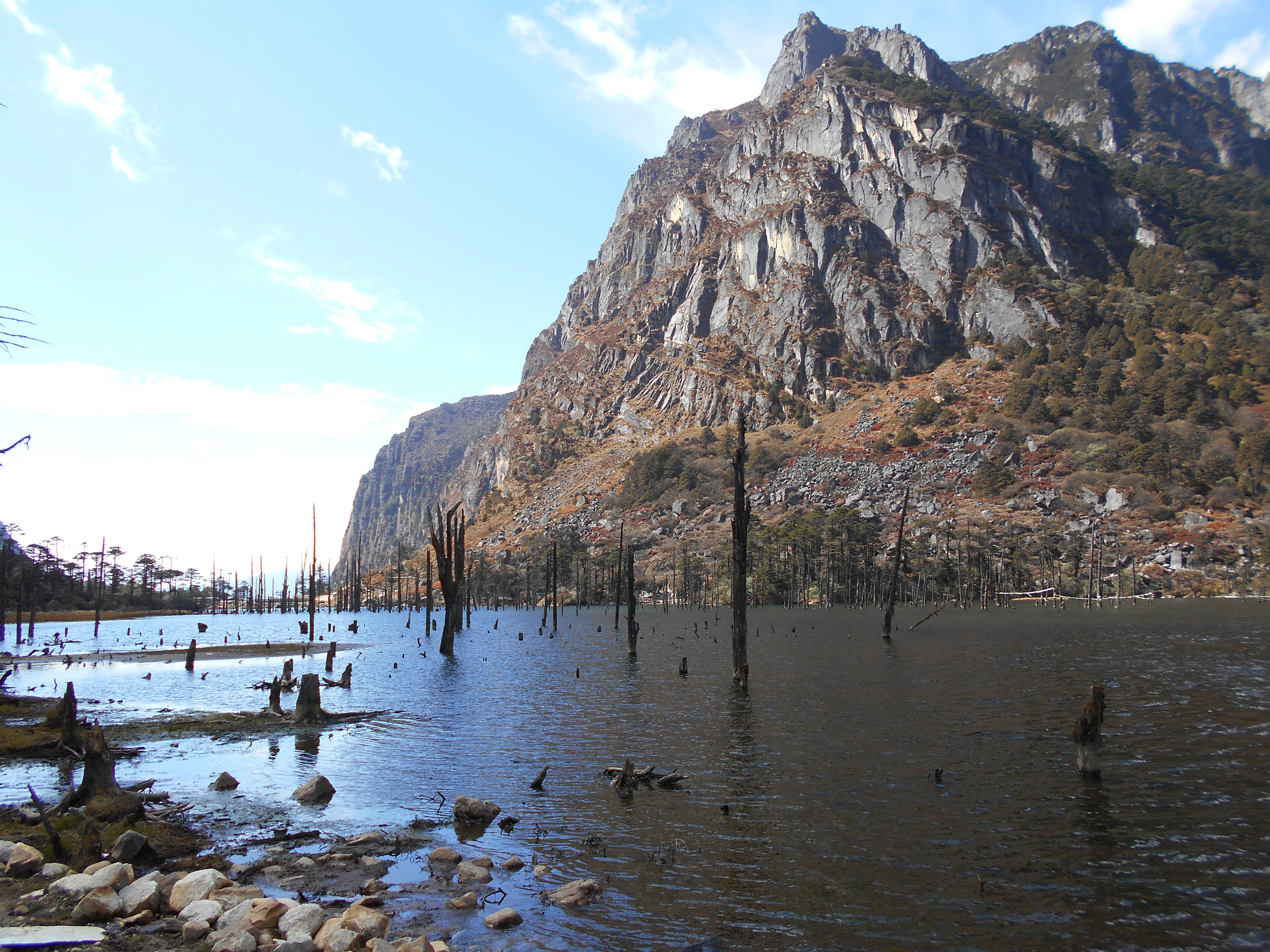
- Sangetsar Tso

- Location within Arunachal Pradesh Location within India
- Location: Tawang district, Arunachal Pradesh, India
- Coordinates: 27.72°N 91.82°E
- Basin countries: IN
- Salinity: none
- Surface elevation: 3,708 metres (12,165 ft)

The Sangetsar Tso, (Note: Alternative spelling: Sangetser Tso, sometimes misspelled as "Sangestar Tso". The Tawang district administration also mentions an alternative name: "Pankang Teng Tso".) formerly called Shonga-tser Lake, and popularly known as the Madhuri Lake, is located on the way from Tawang to Bum La Pass in Tawang district of Arunachal Pradesh, near Indo-China border above 3,708 metres (12,165 ft) above sea level.

== Geography ==
Sangetsar Tso is located about 22 miles (35 km) north of Tawang and 4 miles (6.4 km) west of Bum La Pass.

Sangetsar Tso is within the basin of the Taktsang Chu river, which flows through this region. It originates below the Takpo Shiri glacier to the north, and flows west and then southwest to join the Nyamjang Chu river 8 miles (13 km) downstream. The Sangetsar Tso was created along its course by falling rocks, boulders and trees in an earthquake.

The Taktsang Gompa is also within the area, 1.5 miles (2.4 km) to the west of the lake.

== Tourism ==
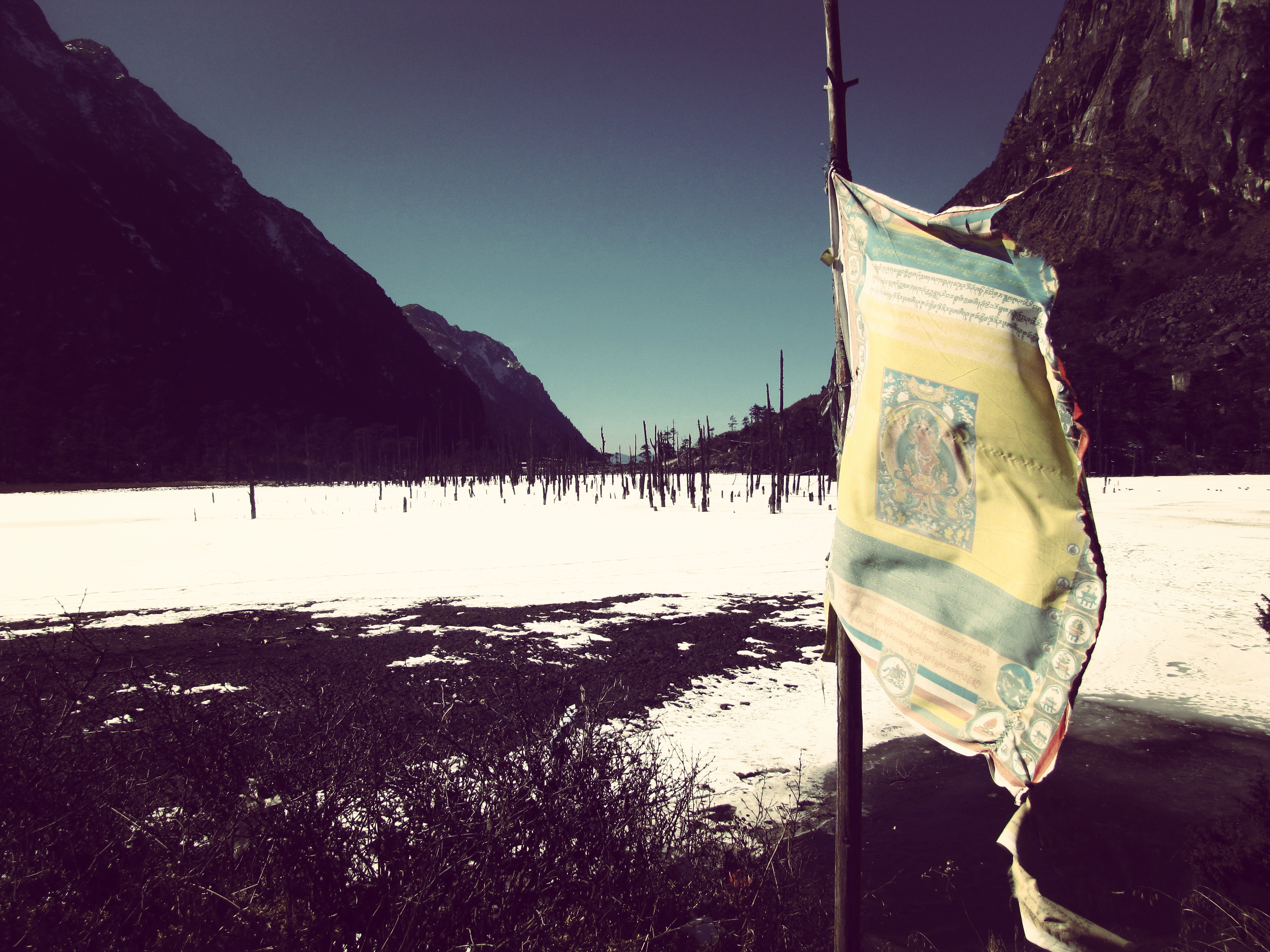
Sangetsar lake in winter

Visit by civilian tourist of India is permissible with permission from the Indian Army. The track is very treacherous, only SUVs advisable, and that too only on clear weather day with no snowfall or rainfall.

=== Permit ===
A special permit is required to visit the Bum La Pass. Permits are requested at the Office of the Deputy Commissioner in Tawang District, and they are in the Indian army cantonment at the Tawang town. Without the army stamp, visitors are not allowed through the numerous check posts along the way.

== Popular culture ==
The lake was featured in a Madhuri Dixit (Bollywood actress) dance sequence in the movie Koyla, as a result of which it has come to be called the Madhuri lake.

== Gallery ==
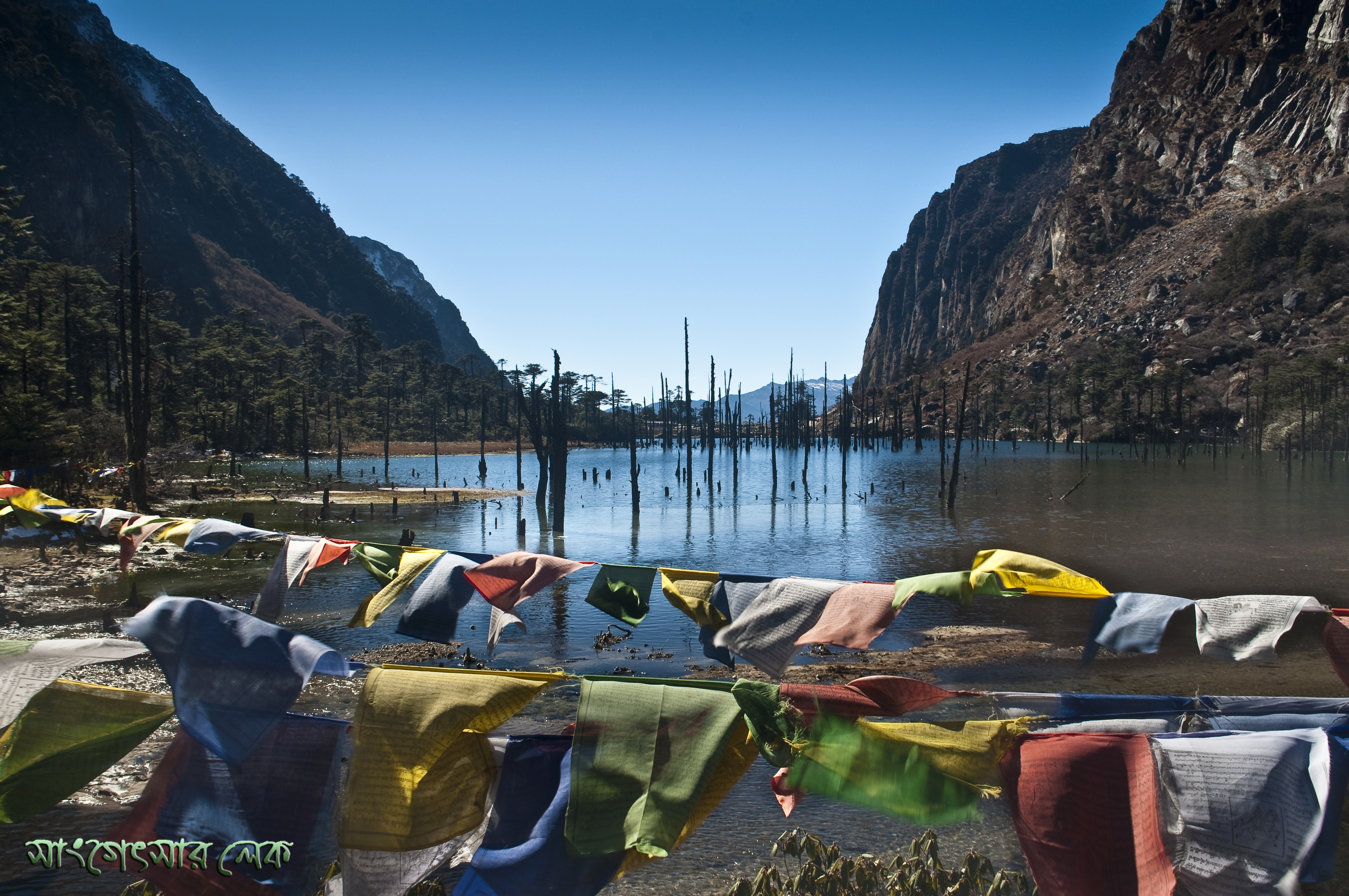

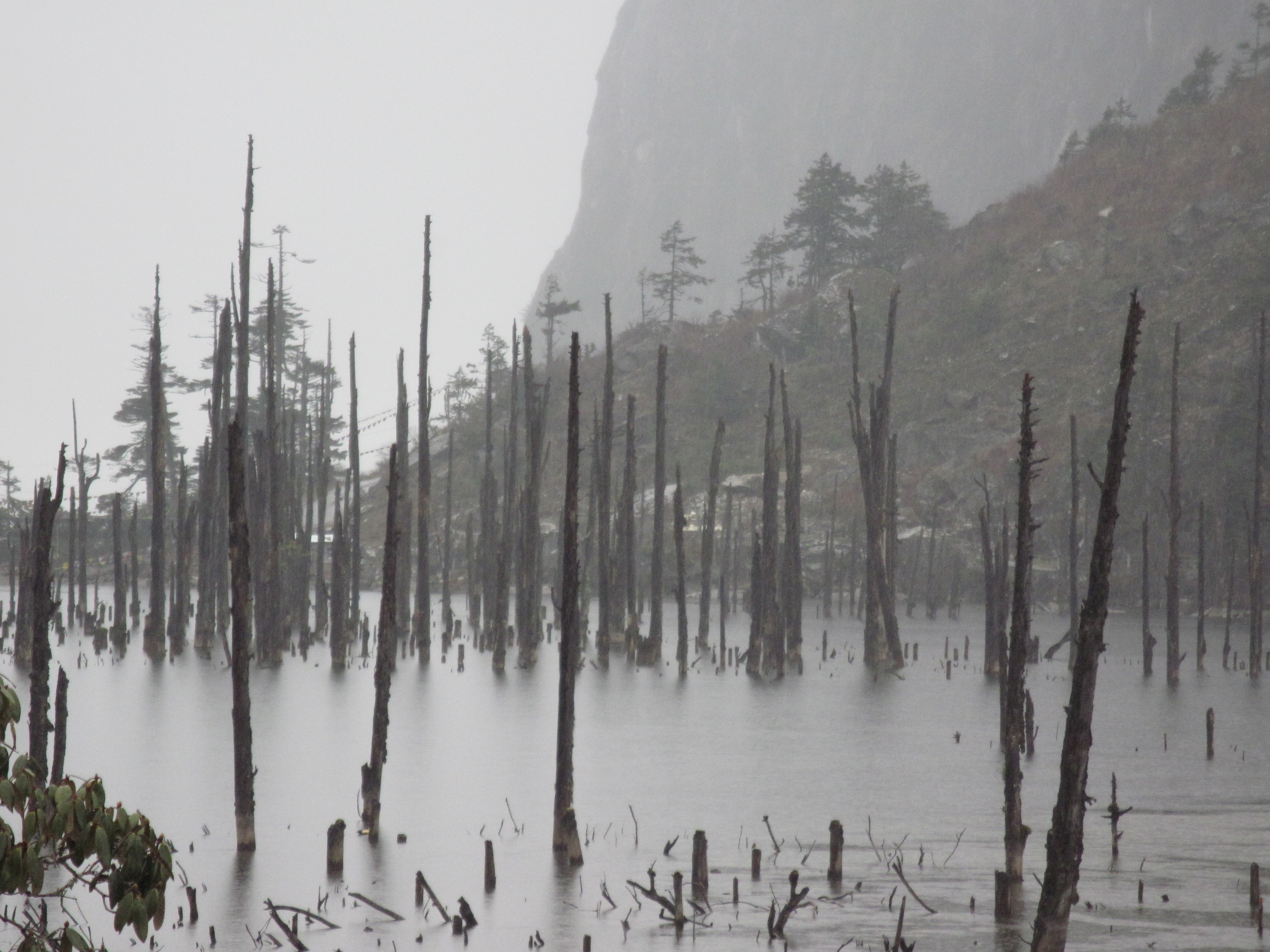

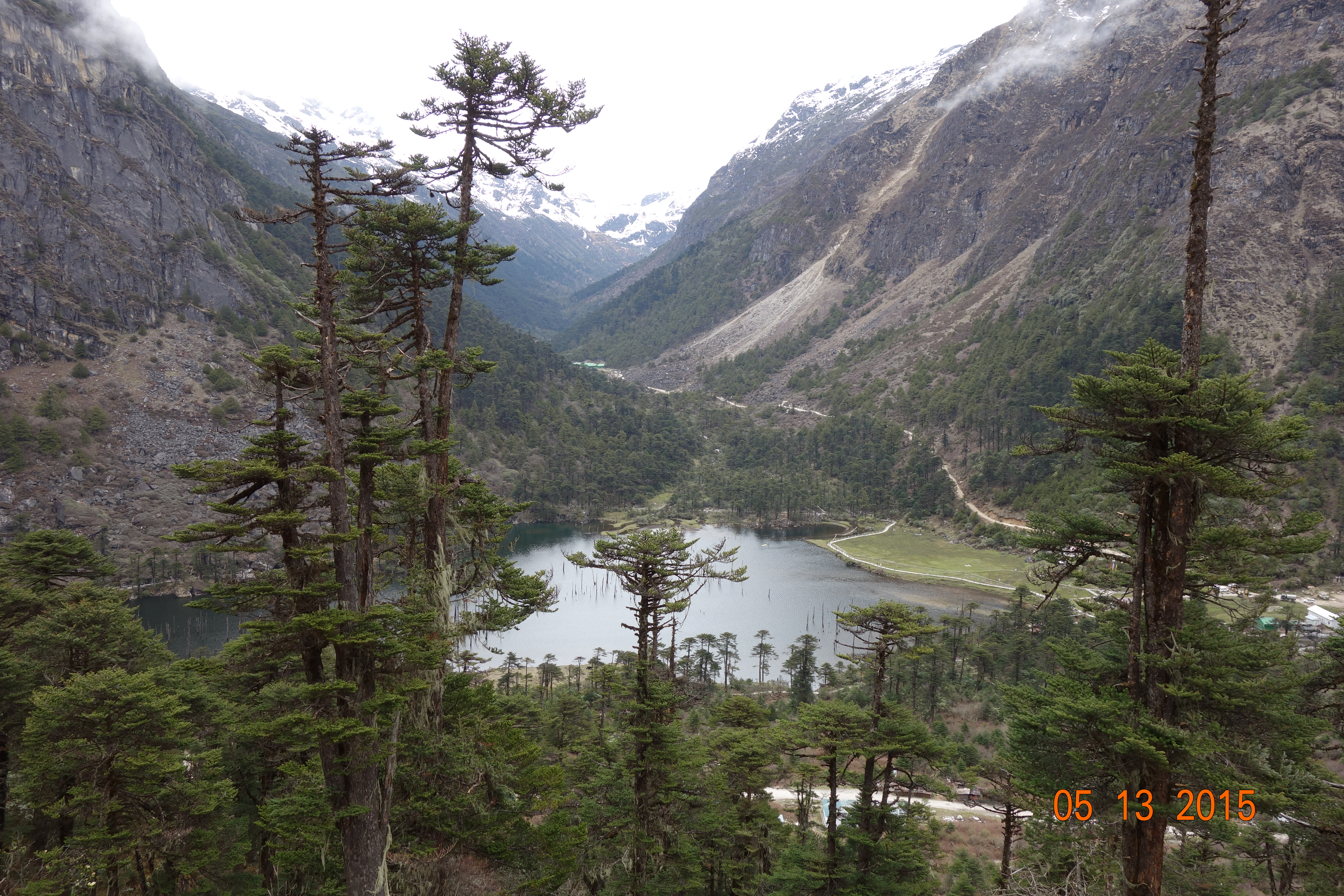

== See also ==
- Tawang Town
- Tawang Monastery
- Tawang district
