= Kitchlu Public School =

Kitchlu Public School, Moga
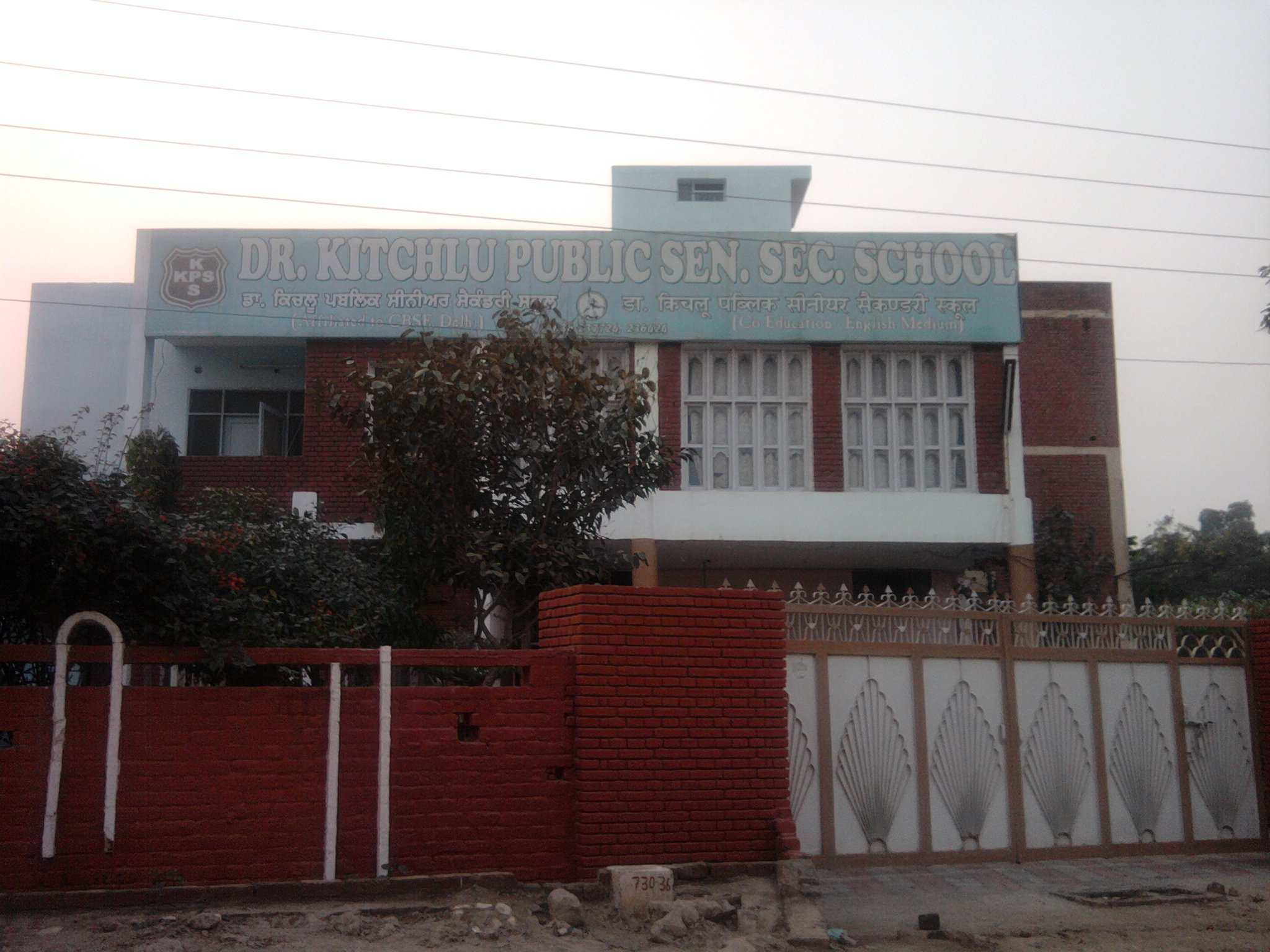

Location
- Moga, Punjab

Information
- School type: Senior secondary
- Motto: We dream... We evolve... We Achieve
- Established: 5 April 1989
- Founder: Baldev Krishan Ji
- Chairman: Sunil Garg and Sunita Garg
- Dean: Malkit Singh
- Principal: Hem Prabha Sood
- Teaching staff: 210
- Enrollment: over 4,000
- Affiliations: CBSE

Dr. Kitchlu Public Sen Sec. School is an English-language school in Moga, Punjab, affiliated with the Central Board of Secondary Education in Delhi. The school is named after an eminent freedom fighter, Saif Ud Din Kitchlu, and was founded in 1989 by Baldev Krishan Ji. The current chairmen are Sunil Garg and his wife Sunita Garg. The school emphasises developing communication skills in English, since the majority of the children are from non-English-speaking backgrounds. There are separate lab facilities for physics, chemistry, biology, mathematics, music and fine arts, and senior secondary classes (years +1 and +2) are held in a separate newly constructed collegiate building.

== Education and student life ==
Teachers and students are divided into four houses: Gandhi, Jawahar, Subhash and Tagore. There are inter-house competitions in art, music, literary and physical activities, and houses decorate the display boards in the reception hall.

Head boy, head girl, vice head boy, vice head girl, cultural secretary, sports captain and vice sports captain are elected annually from amongst the students in classes 9 and 10.

Music periods are included in the timetable in classes 1 through 10, and there is a dance room. Students have participated in dance contests at district and state level and won prizes.

Students go on educational tours during the summer and winter breaks and one-day trips during the school year. There are also annual picnics. However school do not have any good staff services.

== Sports ==
The school has three playgrounds. Sports include basketball, volleyball, kho kho, yoga, badminton and table tennis. There is an annual sports meet.

== Transport ==
The school provides buses to pick up students and teachers from in and outside the city.
