= Mathra Das Pahwa =

Indian ophthalmologist

Rai Bahadur Dr. Mathra Das Pahwa
- Mathra Das Pahwa performing a cataract-removal surgery, 15 January 1951
- Born: 9 October 1880; Hafizabad
- Died: 1972 (aged 91–92)
- Known for: Ophthalmic surgeon

Mathra Das Pahwa (Punjabi: ਮਥਰਾ ਦਾਸ ਪਾਹਵਾ; 9 October 1880 – 1972) was an Indian eye-surgeon who performed thousands of cataract surgeries free-of-cost. He was a member of the Provincial Medical Service. Over his lifetime, it is estimated he carried-out half-a-million surgeries and worked until the age of 92, completing a record 750 surgeries on a single day. Pahwa helped with the development of Moga during his life. He is known as the "messiah of modern Moga" and another popular epithet for him was Netra-Dev ("God of the eyes").

He was headquartered in Moga for much of his career but also completed operations in Beawar in Rajasthan, Srinagar in Jammu & Kashmir, Darbhanga in Bihar, Delhi, and other places. He is also remembered for being the founder of various educational institutions. He treated cataracts and trachoma.

== Biography ==
=== Early life ===
Pahwa was born in a middle-class family on 9 October 1880 in Hafizabad. His father was a doctor. Pahwa was an Arya Samaji. He joined the medical service in 1901.

=== Medical career ===
Moga locality in present-day Moga district was the headquarters of eye-surgeon Mathra Das Pahwa. In 1903, Pahwa first arrived in Moga. The same year was when he first began to work with eyes. He began his medical career as a hospital assistant in Moga. In 1915, he became an assistant surgeon. The 1920's was the peak of Pahwa's surgical career. Pahwa established a hospital in Moga in 1927, where he operated on cataract patients free-of-charge. A large amount of cataract patients were treated over the years by Mathra Das Pahwa, with an operation of his being witnessed by Mahatma Gandhi. To accommodate the increasing number of patients, Pahwa's team had to raise improvised sheds at the Moga hospital. He held eye-camps in various cities throughout India and many eye-surgeons, including foreign ones, consulted him. The Mathra Das High School in Moga was built at a cost of Rs. 75,000 by Mathra Das. In 1931, Mathra Das became the Officiating Civil Surgeon of Ferozepore, later becoming the Officiating Civil Surgeon in 1933. In 1932, it was recorded that Pahwa had completed over 90,000 cataract operations. In 1935, Pahwa retired as a civil surgeon. In 1942, Gandhi remarked the following about Pahwa:

Though I had heard a lot about the reputation of Dr. Mathuradas of Moga. I had never had occasion to witness any of his famous operations for cataract, until I saw them in Wardha last month. He came specially at the invitation of Jamnalalji, and with his assistants restored eyes to about three hundred people who had been blinded by cataract. These mass operations have been described as a yajna (sacrifice). And yajna it certainly is, as any act of selfless service is a sacrifice. This yajna began some years ago in the Bhagavad Bhakti Ashram at Rewari, which Jamnalalji was closely connected. He therefore invited the doctor this time to Wardha. I bowed to Dr. Mathuradas in admiration for his unerring and quick surgical hand. He performed operations at the rate of one in a minute. There was scarcely a mishap. Thousands thus get back their eyes free, as he charges no fee to the poor ...

— Mohandas Karamchand Gandhi, Harijansevak (17 February 1942)

=== Retirement and death ===
After his retirement, Pahwa moved to Lahore. As per Khushwant Singh, he became one of the most sought-after doctors in Lahore. During this time, he would frequently travel to Srinagar in Jammu and Kashmir state on family vacations, where he developed a close-bond with the ruling monarch Maharaja Hari Singh. A piece of land near the Maharaja's palace was bestowed to Pahwa's family. During the partition of Punjab in 1947, the Pahwas left Lahore for Delhi, visiting Srinagar on the way. In 1954, Pahwa was awarded the Padma Shri in the field of medicine (SL no. 35). In 1963, it was recorded that Pahwa was still working as a surgeon. Pahwa died in 1972.

== Family ==
Deepak Pahwa, Chairman of Pahwa Enterprises and Managing Director of Bry-Air (Asia), is Mathra Das Pahwa's grandson. Bry-Air, the flagship company of the Pahwa Group, est. in circa 1964, continues to hold eye camps at Moga as part of its CSR activities. The CSR is headed by Anandita Pahwa.

== Roles held ==
- President of the Municipal Council of Moga, 1924–1940
- Viceroy’s Honorary Assistant Surgeon, 1925–1935
- Member of the District Board of Ferozepore, 1930–1936
- Member of the District Board of Lahore, 1936–1937
- Member of the Punjab Medical Council, 1936–1937
- President of the N.W.R. Doctors Association, 1939
- Member of the Swami Dayanad Trust, Ajmeer, 1940–1946
- Vice-President of the Punjab Medical Council, 1946–1947

== Institutions founded by him ==
- Mathra Das Anglo Sanskrit School, est. 1919
- Arya Putri Pathsahala, MDAS – High School (Sr. Sec. School), est. 1919 in Moga
- DM College of Education, est. in 1926 in Moga
- Mathra Das Civil Hospital, est. in 1927 in Moga

== Awards ==
- Kesari Hind - Silver Medal (1912)
- title of Rai Sahib (1919)
- title of Rai Bahadur (1921)
- Kesari Hind - Gold Medal (1924)
- Kesari Hind (rewarded again, 1932)
- Khilat Fakhra bestowed by Maharaja Rajendra Bahadur (1946)
- Padma Shri (1954)
