= Bilaspur, Punjab =

Bilaspur
- Village
- Location of Bilaspur in Moga, Punjab Bilaspur (India)
- Coordinates: 30.574824°N 75.367584°E
- Country: India
- State: Punjab, India
- List of districts in India: Moga
- Block: Nihal Singh Wala

Languages
  - Governmental: Gurmukhi
  - Regional: Punjabi
- Time zone: UTC+5:30 (IST)
- Nearby City: Moga
- Website: www.ajitwal.com

Bilaspur is an Indian village in the Moga district of Punjab.It lies in the tehsil Nihal Singh Wala. It is a very developed village as compared to other villages in the Moga district.
