= Trilochan Singh Brar =

Indian air force officer

Air Marshal Trilochan Singh Brar PVSM, AVSM
- Born: 9 November 1925; Gurdaspur district Punjab
- Died: 24 March 2014 (aged 88)
- Military career
- Allegiance: India
- Branch: Indian Air Force
- Rank: Air Marshal
- Awards: Param Vishisht Seva Medal; Ati Vishisht Seva Medal

Air Marshal Trilochan Singh Brar PVSM AVSM He was awarded the Param Vishisht Seva Medal and Ati Vishisht Seva Medal. He was Vice Chief of the Air Staff from 22 Sep 1981 to 31 Dec 1983.
