= Brar =

Brar, Baryar
- Jat clan
- Parent tribe: Sidhu
- Language: Punjabi
- Religion: Sikhism, Hinduism, Islam

Brar (Punjabi: ਬਰਾੜ) is a Punjabi Jat clan and surname.

== People with the surname ==
Notable people with the surname, who may or may not be affiliated with the tribe, include:

- Adesh Kanwarjit Singh Brar (1939–2012), Congress MLA from Punjab
- Harcharan Singh Brar (1919–2009), Indian politician, Chief Minister of Punjab, Governor of Orissa, and of Haryana
- Harpal Brar (1939–2025), UK-based Indian communist politician, writer and businessman
- Jagmeet Singh Brar (born 1958), Indian politician, lawyer, writer, and poet
- Jarnail Singh Bhindranwale (1947–1984; born Jarnail Singh Brar), Sikh preacher and leader of Damdami Taksal
- Goldy Brar, gangster, the mastermind behind the murder of Punjabi singer Sidhu Moose Wala
- Jagbir Singh Brar Indian politician (MLA), lawyer and former PWRMDC chairman (2019–2021)
- Karan Brar (born 1999), American actor
- Kuldip Singh Brar, Indian Army General
- Mink Brar (born 1980), German-Indian model, actress, and producer
- Manpreet Brar (born 1973), Indian actress and model, Femina Miss India
- Preet Brar, Punjabi musician
- Raj Brar (1972–2016), Punjabi singer, actor, lyricist, and music director
- Ranveer Brar, Indian chef and TV presenter
- Trilochan Singh Brar (1925–2014), head of the Indian Air Force
