= Moga, Punjab =

Moga Mōgā (Punjabi)
- City
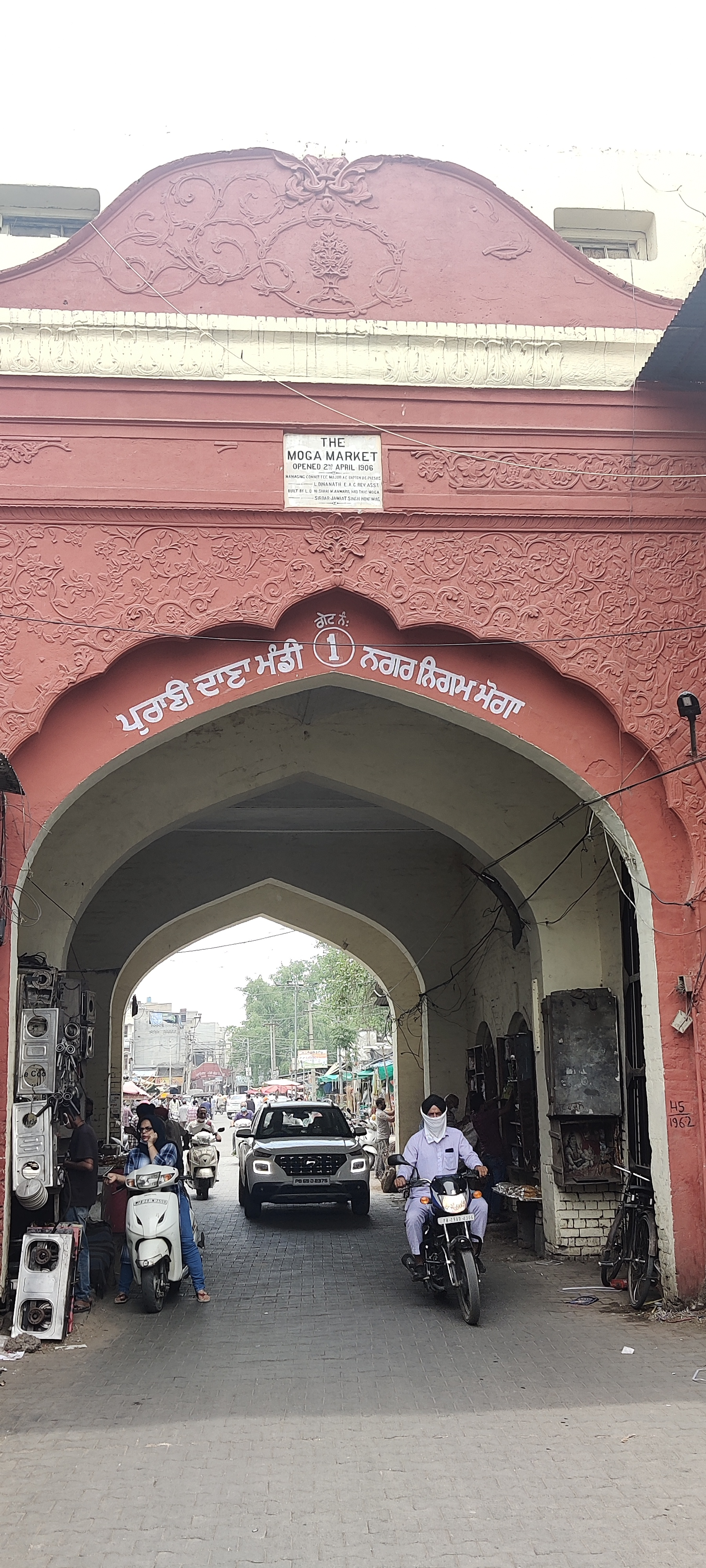
- Old Grain Market gate, Moga

- Location in Punjab, India Moga (India) Moga (Asia)
- Coordinates: 30.822°N 75.174°E
- Country: India
- State: Punjab
- District: Moga
- Established: 17th century
- Named for: Moga Singh Gill

Government
  - Type: Municipality
  - Body: Moga Municipal Corporation

Area
  - Total: 24.5 km^{2} (9.5 sq mi)
  - Rank: 19th in Punjab
- Elevation: 217 m (712 ft)

Population (2011)
  - Total: 159,897
  - Rank: 6th in Punjab
  - Density: 400/km^{2} (1,000/sq mi)

Languages
  - Official: Punjabi
- Time zone: UTC+5:30 (IST)
- PIN: 142001
- Telephone code: 1636
- Vehicle registration: PB-29
- Sex ratio: 1000:883 ♂/♀
- Website: moga.nic.in

Moga is a city in the Indian state of Punjab. It was made a part and headquarters of the Moga district (the 17th District in the state) on 24 November 1995, by the then Chief Minister Harcharan Singh Brar. Before becoming a district, Moga was a part of Faridkot district as a tehsil. Moga is situated on the National Highway 95 (NH-95 Ferozpur-Ludhiana road). The area of Dharamkot block with 150 villages has been merged into Moga district, which falls under the jurisdiction of Ferozpur division.

== Etymology ==
The name of Moga may be derived from the Indo-Scythian king, Maues, who invaded and ruled the area in the 1st century BCE after conquering the Indo-Greek polities of the region.

The city may also have been named after Moga Gill, who along his brother Vega Gill, were men of importance among the Wadan Gills.

== History ==
=== Early history ===
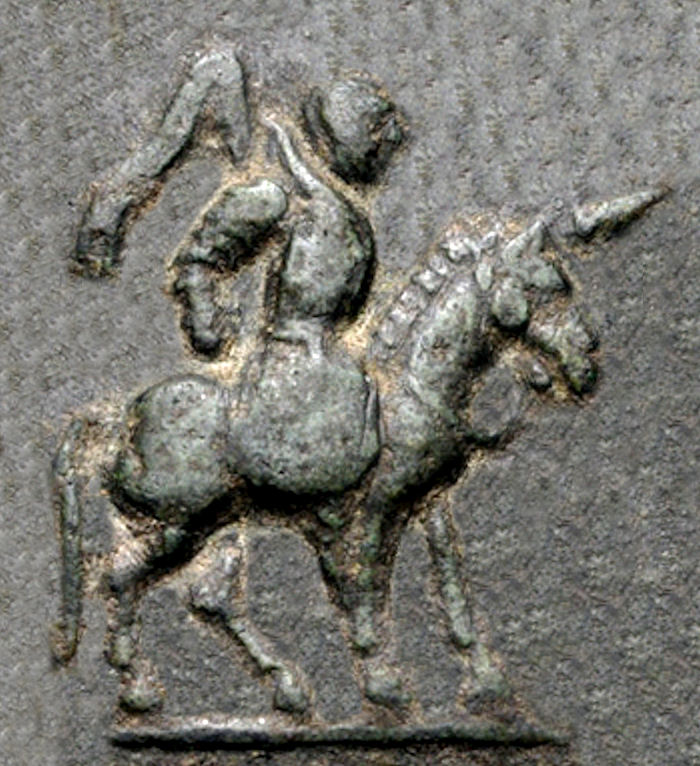
Raja Moga on-horseback. Detail from a coin.

A theory states Moga was named after Moga of the Gill clan, who owned a jagir that was located on the present-day location of Moga city. The settlement of Moga (later a town and now a city) was established around 500-years-ago in around the late 15th or 16th century, as per one source. However, other sources date the establishment of Moga to a later period. According to the 2011 district census handbook for Moga district, the Wadan Gills, one of the twelve branches of the Gill Jats, were settled in the southern and western areas of the present-day district in around the early 17th century. However, a branch of the Sidhu Jats, known as the Brars, particularly the Sangar clan of the Brars, attacked the Gills and therefore the Gills settled further northward, establishing the settlements of Moga, Chhirak, and Chal. Peace was made between the antagonistic Gill and Sangar Jatts through a marital alliance, with a daughter of the Sangar Jatts being married to a Gill Jat, which improved the social-standing of the Brars in the area. Two sons were produced from this marriage: Vega and Moga. The settlement of Moga was named after the son Moga, born from a Wadan Gill father and Sangar Brar mother.

However, there are variations to the same tale. A per another local dictum, the two brothers were named Moga Singh and Joga Singh. (Note: 'Moga Singh' is also known as 'Moga Gill'.) Joga Singh's successors established two different villages called Moga Mehla Singh and Moga Ajit Singh. The settlement of Moga was formed by combining these two villages together, with the village being divided into five pattis (meaning "part"), named after Moga Singh's sons: Chirag Patti, Sangali Patti, Ausang Patti, Bagha Patti, and Rupa Patti.

A similar background story is recounted in Visakha Singh's Malwa Itihās. According to Visakha Singh, Moga had been established in the 1st century CE by Raja Mog, who established Mog Badh on the southern bank of Sutlej. However, the settlement was destroyed during the Huna invasion of the Indian subcontinent, with Tihara and Janer also being annihalated. As for the establishment of the re-built Moga, the Gills of Moga are credited by Visakha Singh. According to him, the Gills of Moga trace their origin back to Bathinda, specifically the ruling dynasty of Binaypal. When Binaypal's dynasty in Bathinda was destroyed by a ruler named Mahmud, the Gills are said to have dispersed from the area to settle elsewhere, establishing new villages in the process. One branch of the Gills who left Bathinda went-on to found the settlement of Vairoke, headed by an individual named Moga Gill. It was Moga Gill's group who re-established the settlement of Moga on-top of the ruins of the much earlier 'Mog Badh'. Local folklore claims that Moga Gill and Rattan Mal, who had betrayed the Binaypal dynasty of Bathinda, were in conflict with one another, with Rattan Mal attacking the Gills at Vairoke, causing its destruction. The folktales involve curses and religious sages, with Moga Gill apparently being cursed by Rattan Mal to die childless. However, a Muslim sai (saint) heard of Moga Gill's curse and supposedly blessed him after forty-two days of praying that Moga's descendants will found forty-two villages, on the grounds of the first-child being given to the sai. The first child of Moga was named Aval Khair, who founded the settlement of Aval Khurana, becoming its chaudary (head). (Note: Aval Khair's name is also spelt as 'Awwall Khair'.) There were also other descendants of Moga Gill apart from Aval Khair, who founded their own villages as well. The feud between Rattan Mal and the Gills of Moga reach a conclusion in the tales, with the Gills (descendants of Aval Khair and other Gill branches of Moga) allying with Kalu Nath and Sidh Bhoi to defeat Rattan Mal. To commemorate Sidh Bhoi of the Dhaliwals, the Gills constructed many memorials to him, such as on the outskirts of Lopo near Badhni, at Rajeana near Bagha Purana, and another nearby Lallu Wal village. (Note: Sidh Bhoi is also spelt as 'Sidh Bhoe'.)

Despite the Moga region being under nominal Muslim-rule, in-reality the influences of the dominant Jatt tribes of the area prevailed, namely the Gills and Dhaliwals, consisting of clan-chieftainships (chaudharis). During the early Mughal-Sikh Wars, in 1634 Guru Hargobind left Amritsar to avoid Mughal persecution and arrived near Moga with fresh recruits enlisted en route to stage a counter-attack against the Mughal government. When near Moga, he sent his family to safety in Kartarpur and while he remained in the Malwa region with his army. According to Visakha Singh, the local Gill and Dhaliwal tribes (including Rai Jodh of Kangar) of the Moga region, provided military assistance to Guru Hargobind during the Battle of Mehraj. Most of the Jat tribes of the local area were converted to Sikhism by the missionary works of the seventh Guru of the Sikhs, Har Rai. The area of Moga was one of the 45 taluqas (subdistrict) south of the Sutlej River that was claimed by Maharaja Ranjit Singh as belonging to or claimed by him through Sada Kaur as per a list by Captain William Murray on 17 March 1828.

=== British period ===
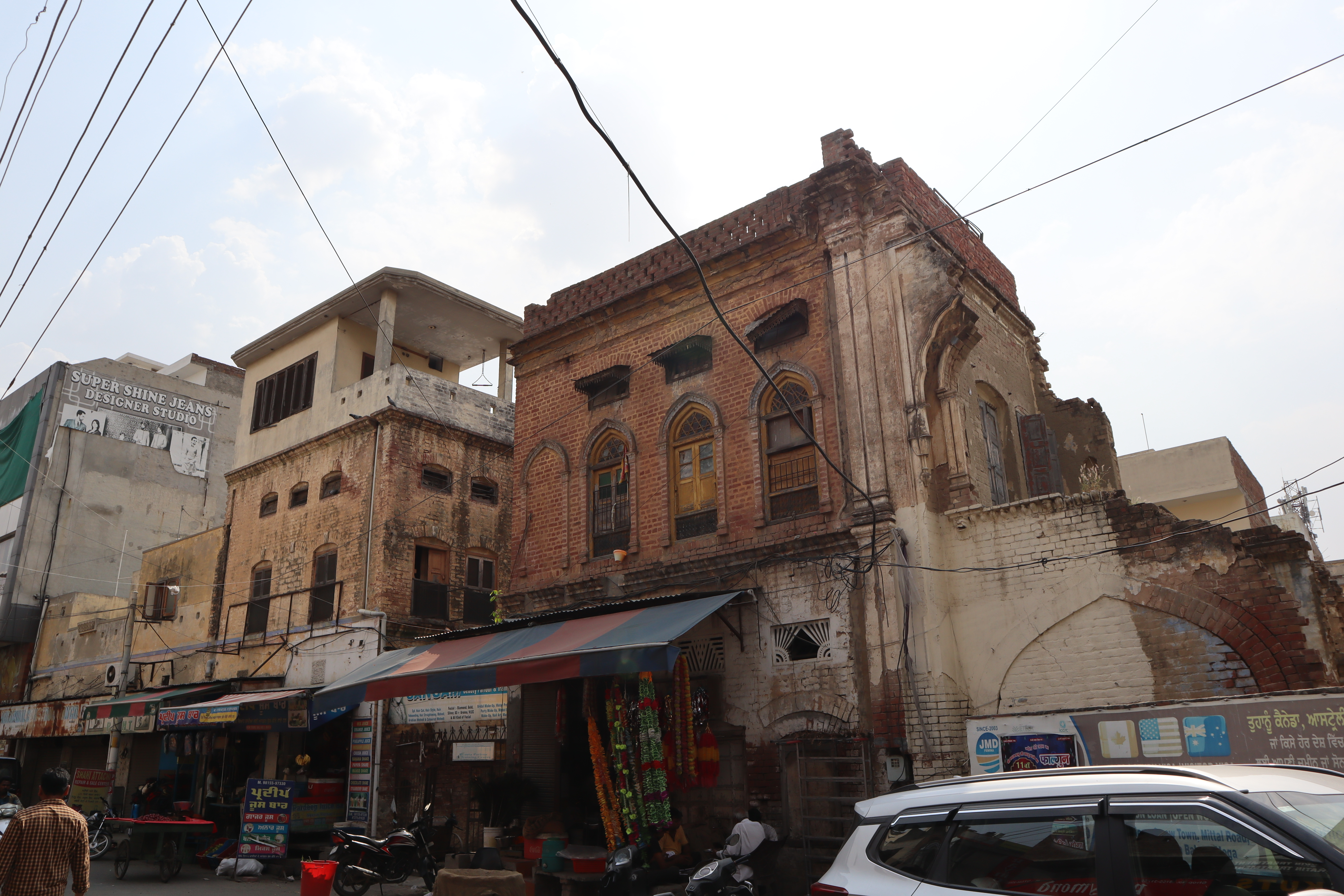
Photograph of a colonial-era building located within Moga city, Moga district, Punjab, India, April 2023

In 1899, a co-educational school was founded in Moga (then in the Ferozpore district) by the Dev Samaj.The Dev Samaj school was later upgraded to become the Dev Samaj High School.

In 1901, the railway reached Moga locality and former jagir lands of Moga Gill were converted into the settlement. At that era, Moga locality was an important location for the tea trade, which led to the coining of the phrase: Moga chah joga (meaning "Moga only has tea").

In 1901, a plague was ravaging the local region, including Moga. However, there were not enough huts established to treat victims and infected and non-infected persons were requested to congregate in the camps, increasing the infections.

In November 1914, two officials were shot dead in Moga by Ghadarites during a raid on a local treasury. In March 1921, pro-Gandhi slogans were raised by passengers disembarking from a train at Moga, who refused to present their tickets to the station-master.

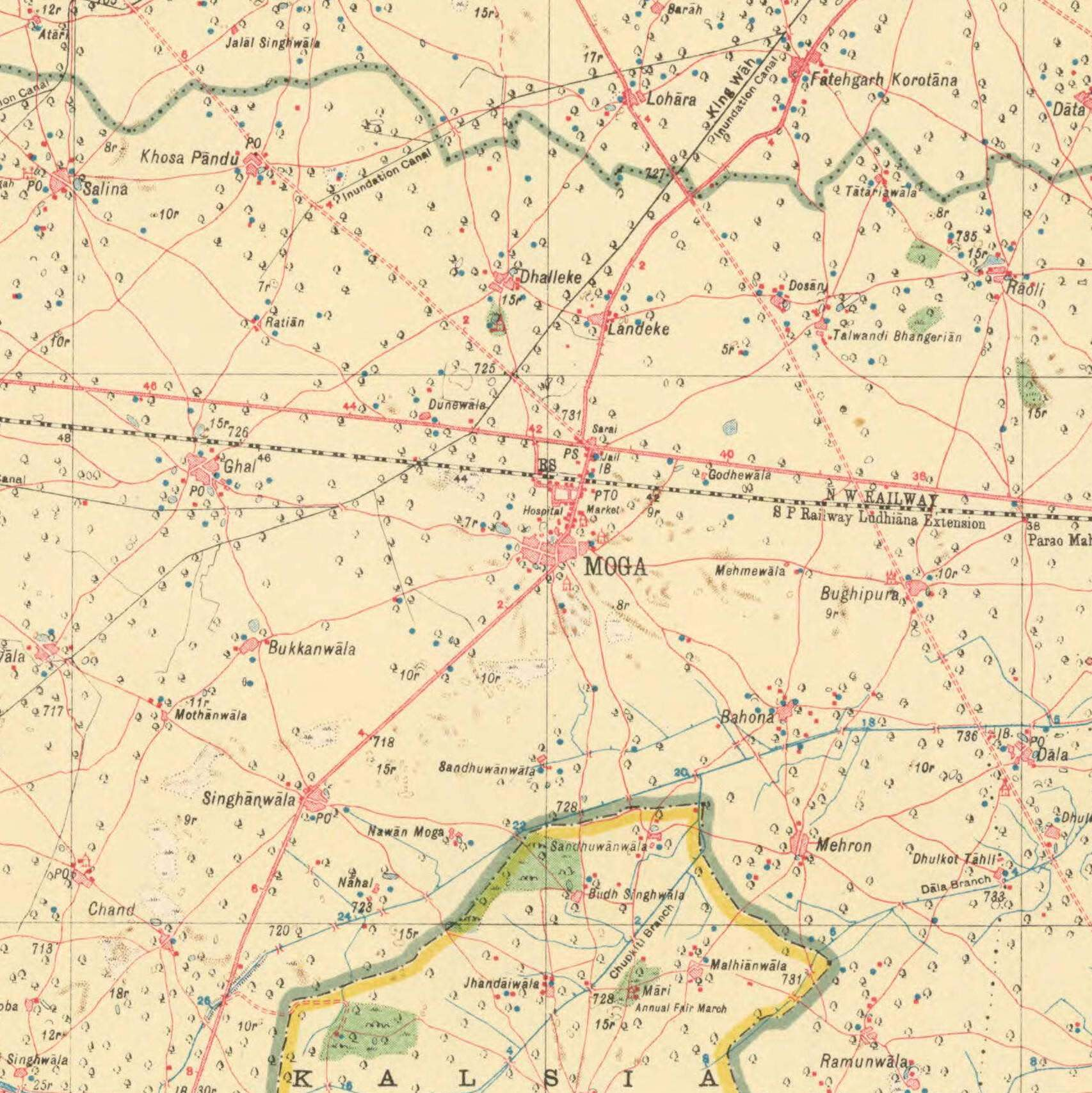
Moga town and the surrounding environs, Survey of India geographical block-map for 44 N NW Ferozepore (1921)

In 1926, the Dayanand Mathra Dass College was established in present-day Moga city, making the city one of the few to have had an established college within it prior to independence. (Note: The college is popularly abbreviated at 'D. M. College'.) Moga locality was the headquarters of eye-surgeon Mathra Das Pahwa, who established a hospital there in 1927, where he operated on cataract patients free-of-charge. A large number of cataract patients were treated over the years by Mathra Das Pahwa, with an operation of his being witnessed by Mahatma Gandhi.

During a tour of Punjab in 1938, Nehru visited Moga town and met with Ghadar/Kirti leaders and socialist workers.

At the end of June in 1939, an agriculturalist movement arose in Chuhar Chak village over farmers wanting to stop paying the chowkidara tax, which had long been a demand. A delegation of the farmers sent to Moga town to meet with the tehsildar were arrested for tax non-payment. With news spreading of the arrests, jathas arrived in Moga from Chuhar Chak village and over a period of a few days, around 350 people (incl. 50 women) courted arrest. The agitation effectively wanted to end payment of land revenue. However, the Punjab Kisan Committee, distracted by other concerns at the time involving the Lahore Kisan Morcha, and not wanting to divert more of its resources, suspended the Chuhar Chak agitation by commanding the local committee to stop it.

In July 1947, 80,000 ruppees were collected from the Moga grain market to purchase weapons to be used against local Muslims of Moga. Furthermore, an Akali martyr squad named Khalsa Sewak Dal was organised. The Hindu organisation, Rashtriya Sawayamsevak Sangh (R.S.S.), also made a resolve against the Muslims of Moga. A local Muslim League leader named Sukh Annyat hired trucks and left the city with property and family. However, his brother Hadayat Khan was murdered in the violence of partition by the son of an RSS leader named Lala Ram Rakha Sud, who was in-charge of the local RSS outfit. On 2 August 1947, six Muslim mendicants were murdered near the Ludhiana-Moga railway line, with the deceased victims being accused of being bomb-makers. Curfew was put in-place on 17 August 1947, however by 23 August 1947, there were reportedly no Muslims to be found any longer in Moga town and the surrounding villages, with the former Muslims having fled as refugees over the Radcliffe Line into Western Punjab. When Robert Atkins visited Moga town during the partition of India, he recounts that he witnessed mutilated bodies strewn over the town resulting from a massacre that occurred there. Moga was one of the regions of the Punjab that had experienced heavy losses in human lives and property during the partition.

=== Post-independence ===
On 24 September 1954, the 12th session of the All India Kisan Sabha (AIKS) was held at Moga, with a decision to form an organisation that was separate from the AIKS being decided at the meeting.

An event called the All-India Workers' Conference was held in Moga in September 1968, establishing the Bharatiya Khet Mazdoor Union with a membership of 251,000 at the time. The areas of Moga district were heavily affected by Communist insurgencies in the latter half of the 20th century, being one of the worst affected areas of the state of Punjab.

On 5 October 1972, a group of people were protesting against the black marketing of tickets at a cinema in Moga when police opened fire on them, leading to the deaths of four people. Two students, Harjit Singh and Swarn Singh of Charrik village, and passersbys Gurdev Singh and Kewal Krishan, were killed in the police firing, near Regal Cinema in Moga. The incident lead to a movement known as the Moga agitation, a student movement which was led by leftist groups where protestors set afire government buildings and public transport for two months. (Note: The incident is also known as Moga Goli Kand 1972 and the movement born from the incident is also known as the 'Moga-Regal Cinema Movement'.) The student movement had ramifications throughout the Punjab. The Punjab Students Union (PSU) was formed the same year. In 1972, PSU president Iqbal Khan and general secretary Pirthipal Singh Randhawa led protests against the price rise and the black marketing of cinema tickets. A library would later be established at former location of Regal Cinema to commemorate the martyred students. The incident has been likened to the earlier Jallianwala Bagh massacre of 1919. At the Moga Sangram Rally of 1974, the Congress-run government of Indira Gandhi was challenged. The PSU later opposed the bus fare hike in 1979.

On 26 June 1989, during the Punjab insurgency, an event known as the Moga massacre occurred, when suspected Khalistani militants opened fire on RSS workers undergoing a morning exercise and indoctrination session in Nehru Park in Moga city. The attack led to the deaths of 24 people and was suspected of being carried out by the Khalistan Commando Force. Moga district also experienced encounter-killings during the insurgency, such as the case of Bharpur Singh (aged 21), Bobby Monga, and Satnam Singh, on the Moga-Talwandi road at Khukhrana village on 27–28 December 1990. The three were travelling together through Moga when a police group led by Mangal Singh indiscriminately fired on them, killing Bharpur and Bobby but Satnam survived, with the police characterising the incident as "cross firing between the police and militants".

In 1996, at a historic conference in Moga known as the Moga Conference, the Shiromani Akali Dal adopted a moderate Punjabi agenda and shifted its party headquarters from Amritsar to Chandigarh.

== Demographics ==
Religion in Moga city
| Religion | Percent |
| Sikhism | 50.46% |
| Hinduism | 46.83% |
| Christianity | 0.98% |
| Islam | 0.79% |
| Others | 0.94% |

As per provisional data of 2011 census Moga urban agglomeration had a population of 159,897, out of which males were 84,808 and females were 75,089. The effective literacy rate was 81.42 per cent.

The table below shows the population of different religious groups in Moga city and their gender ratio, as of 2011 census.

Population by religious groups in Moga city, 2011 census
| Religion | Total | Female | Male | Gender ratio |
|---|---|---|---|---|
| Sikh | 82,456 | 39,092 | 43,364 | 901 |
| Hindu | 76,511 | 35,625 | 40,886 | 871 |
| Christian | 1,595 | 744 | 851 | 874 |
| Muslim | 1,284 | 549 | 735 | 746 |
| Jain | 150 | 67 | 83 | 831 |
| Buddhist | 56 | 29 | 27 | 1074 |
| Other religions | 117 | 51 | 66 | 772 |
| Not stated | 1,228 | 636 | 592 | 1074 |
| Total | 163,397 | 76,793 | 86,604 | 886 |

As of 2001 India census, the town of Moga had a population of 124,624. Males constitute 54% of the population and females 46%. Moga has an average literacy rate of 68%, higher than the national average of 59.5%: male literacy is 71%, and female literacy is 66%. In Moga, 11% of the population is under 6 years of age.

== Education ==
Below is the list of notable educational institutes in Moga:

- Kitchlu Public School
- Baba Kundan Singh Memorial Law College, Moga

== Connectivity ==
=== Road connectivity ===
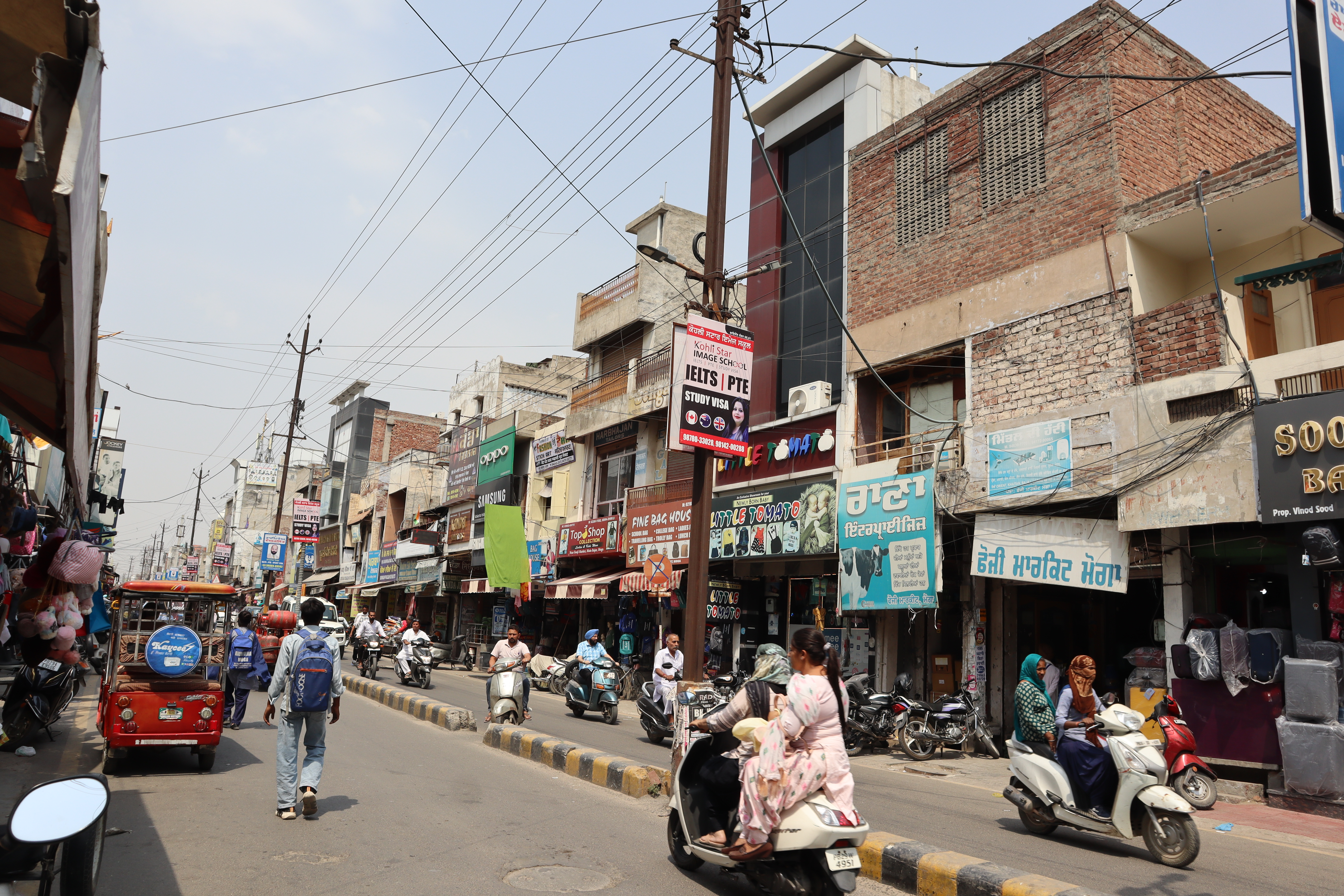
Photograph of a busy street of Moga city in Punjab, India, April 2023

Moga is well connected by NH5 to Chandigarh and Shimla in the northeast and to Ferozpur in the West.

=== Rail connectivity ===
Moga has a train station under the Northern Railway named Moga, which connects it. Firozpur, Ludhiana, Chandigarh, Ambala, Delhi, New Delhi, and Jaipur are all well connected to it. A few trains, such as the Ajmer As Express, Cdg Fzr Express, and As Ajmer Express.

== Notable people ==
- Narinder Singh Kapany, Indian-born American physicist, known for his works in fibre optics.
- Gurinder Singh, Fifth and Present Satguru of Radha Soami Satsang Beas.
- Lala Lajpat Rai, Indian freedom fighter
- Shekhar Gurera, Indian Editorial Cartoonist.
- Lachhman Singh Gill, Chief Minister of Punjab
- Sonu Sood, Indian film actor
- Dharampreet was a well known Punjabi singer hailed from Bilaspur town near Moga
- Harmanpreet Kaur, Indian cricketer
- Joginder Singh Sahnan, Indian Army soldier, and recipient of the Param Vir Chakra for his efforts in the Sino-Indian War.
- Harpreet Brar, Indian cricketer

== See also ==
- Moga Municipal Corporation
