= Joginder Singh (soldier) =

Indian, recipient of Param Vir Chakra (1921 – 1962)

Subedar Joginder Singh Sahnan PVC
- Born: 26 September 1921; Mahla Kalan, Moga district, Punjab, British India
- Died: 23 October 1962 (aged 41); Bum La Pass, North-East Frontier Agency, India
- Military career
- Allegiance: British India; India
- Branch: British Indian Army (1936-47); Indian Army (1947-62)
- Service years: 1936–1962
- Rank: Subedar
- Service number: JC-4547
- Units: 1st battalion, Sikh Regiment
- Conflicts: Second World War; Indo-Pakistani War of 1947; Sino-Indian War
- Awards: Param Vir Chakra

Subedar Joginder Singh, PVC (26 September 1921 – 23 October 1962), was an Indian soldier and posthumous recipient of India's highest military award, the Param Vir Chakra. Singh joined the British Indian Army in 1936 and served in the 1st battalion of the Sikh Regiment. During the 1962 Sino-Indian War, he was commanding a platoon at the Bum La Pass in the North-East Frontier Agency. Though heavily outnumbered, he bravely led his troops against a Chinese assault and defended his post until he was wounded and captured. Singh died from his injuries while in Chinese custody.

== Early life ==
Joginder Singh was born on 26 September 1921 in Mahla Kalan, Moga district, Punjab, British India. He spent his childhood in the same village. His father Sher Singh Sahnan belonged to an agricultural Saini Sikh family which had relocated to Mahla Kalan in Moga district from the village Munak Kalan (often pronounced as Munaka) in Hoshiarpur district. His mother was Bibi Krishan Kaur Bhela. Joginder Singh married Bibi Gurdyal Kaur Banga, who was from a Saini family in the village Kothay Rara Singh, near Kotkapura. He went to primary school in Nathu Ala village and went to middle school in Daroli village. He decided to join the army, considering that it would give him an "identity and purpose".

== Military career ==
On joining the British Indian Army, Singh was posted to the 1st battalion of the Sikh Regiment (1 Sikh) on 28 September 1936. After joining the army, he identified his interest in education, and soon passed the Army Education Examination. He was subsequently appointed as the Unit Education Instructor. He served in the Second World War on the Burma front, and in Srinagar during the Indo-Pakistani War of 1947–1948.

=== Sino-India War ===
There had long been disagreement between India and China over disputed borders in the Himalayas region. To counter the increasing Chinese intrusions into the disputed territory, then Prime Minister of India Jawaharlal Nehru asked for strategies for dealing with them. However, the proposal put forward by the Indian Army was rejected. Instead, he approved a plan proposed by a bureaucrat called the "Forward Policy". This called for the establishment of several small posts facing the Chinese positions. Due to the severe rise in public criticism against Chinese intrusions, Nehru implemented the "Forward Policy" against the advice of the army. The army's concern was that the Chinese had a geographical advantage. Additionally, maintaining numerous small posts would be untenable if the superior Chinese forces attacked. This was ruled out by Nehru who believed the Chinese would not attack. However, the Chinese did attack and this initiated the Sino-India War.

==== Param Vir Chakra Action (Battle at Bum La) ====
On 9 September 1962, then Defence Minister of India Krishna Menon decided to evict the Chinese troops south of Thagla Ridge. This decision was endorsed by Nehru, who was in London to attend the Commonwealth Prime Ministers' Conference. Subsequently, the 7th Infantry Brigade, which included 1 Sikh, was ordered to move to Namka Chu, which was considered militarily unsound and an advantageous ground for the Chinese. This move was strongly criticized by the Indian media, who publicized it with "sensational headlines", arguing India's military offensive capability.

The Chinese, aware of these developments, attacked the unprepared Indian post at Namka Chu. Though the Indian troops resisted the attack, they took heavy casualties due to inadequate ammunition and weak communication lines. Soon after the attack, the Chinese advanced to Tawang. Midway they encountered an Indian post at the Bum La Pass, held by a platoon of 20 men from 1 Sikh. The post was under the command of Singh, now a subedar. The Chinese attacked the post in three waves, each comprising 200 men. Though the initial two attacks were repelled successfully, by that time, the platoon was depleted to half of its original strength. Singh was also wounded but refused evacuation. Soon the ammunition was exhausted, and the survivors were only left with their bayonets.

The Sikh soldiers then charged toward the Chinese, shouting the war cry Waheguru Ji Ka Khalsa, Waheguru Ji Ki Fateh. (Note: English: Hail the Khalsa who belongs to the Lord God! Hail the Lord God to whom belongs the victory.) The Chinese lines were scattered at this sight and many were bayoneted. Due to heavy numbers and superior weapons, the Chinese were able to withstand the last charge by Singh and his remaining soldiers. Before Singh was overpowered and captured by the Chinese, he single-handedly killed a number of Chinese soldiers with his bayonet. He later succumbed to his injuries and died in Chinese captivity.

=== Awarding of Param Vir Chakra ===
Though being heavily outnumbered, Singh led his men, and kept their morale up, in the face of the enemy. For his action of gallantry on 23 October 1962, he was awarded the Param Vir Chakra, India's highest military decoration. The citation reads:

Subedar Joginder Singh was the commander of a platoon of the Sikh Regiment holding a defensive position at a ridge near Tongpen La in NEFA. At 0530 hours on 23 October 1962, the Chinese opened a very heavy attack on the Bum la axis to break through to Towang. The leading battalion of the enemy attacked the ridge in three waves, each about 200 strong. Subedar Joginder Singh and his men mowed down the first wave, and the enemy was temporarily halted by the heavy losses it suffered. Within a few minutes, a second wave came over and was dealt with similarly. But the platoon had, by then, lost half its men. Subedar Joginder Singh was wounded in the thigh but refused to be evacuated. Under his inspiring leadership, the platoon stubbornly held its ground and would not withdraw. Meanwhile, the position was attacked for the third time. Subedar Joginder Singh himself manned a light machine gun and shot down a number of the enemy. The Chinese however continued to advance despite heavy losses. When the situation became untenable Subedar Joginder Singh and the few men that were left in the position fixed bayonets and charged the advancing Chinese, bayoneting a number of them before he and his comrades were overpowered. Throughout this action, Subedar Joginder Singh displayed devotion to duty, inspiring leadership and bravery of the highest order.

— Gazette of India Notification No.68—Press/62,

The Chinese sent his ashes with full military honors to the battalion on 17 May 1963. The urn was later brought to the Sikh Regimental Centre at Meerut, and eventually handed over to his wife.

== Other honours ==
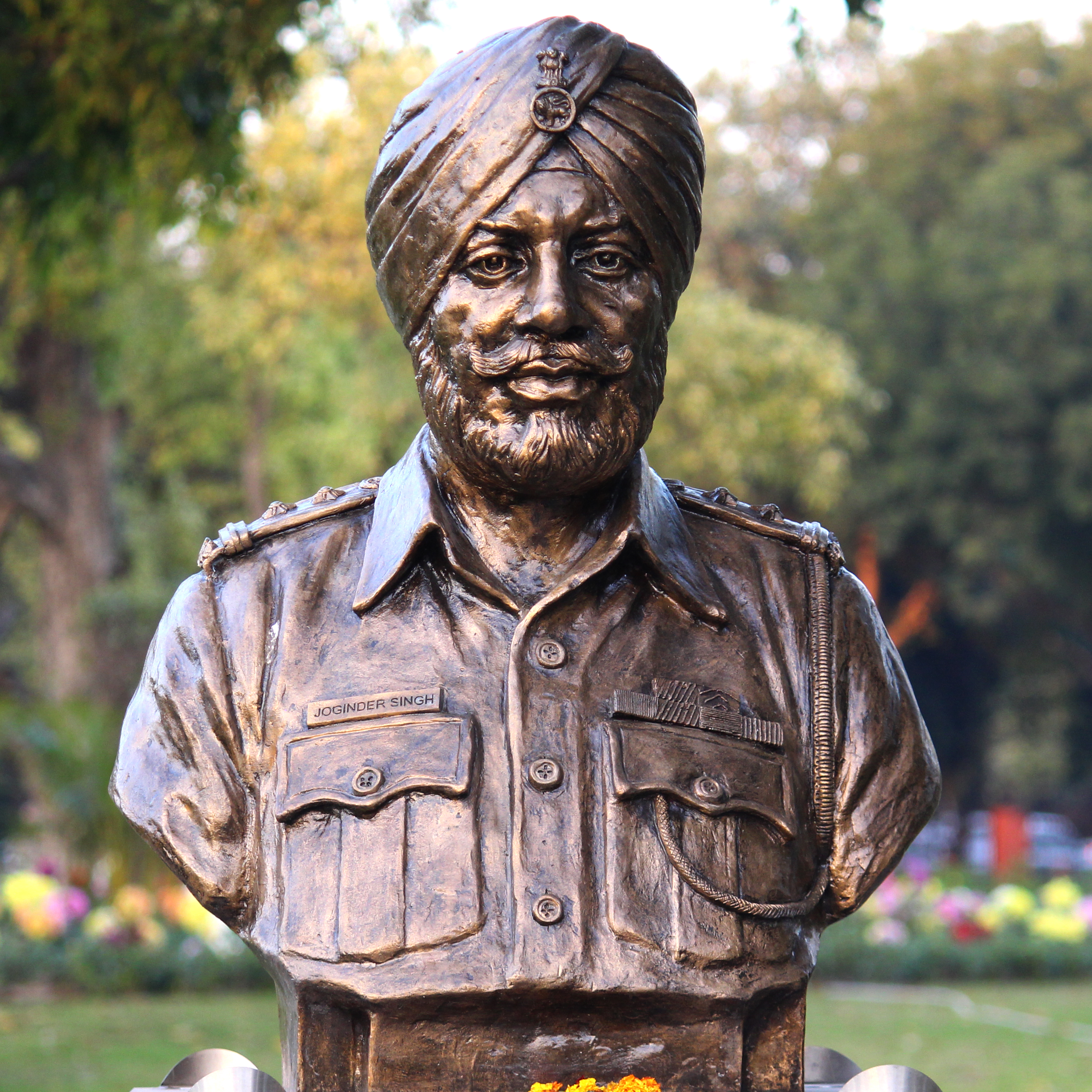
Singh's statue at Param Yodha Sthal, National War Memorial, New Delhi

In the 1980s, the Shipping Corporation of India (SCI), a Government of India enterprise under the aegis of the Ministry of Shipping, named fifteen of its crude oil tankers in honor of the PVC recipients. The tanker MT Subedar Joginder Singh, PVC was delivered to SCI in 1984, and served for 25 years before being phased out. In Singh's honour, a memorial statue has been built near the Office of District Collector in Moga, and a monument has been built at IB Ridge by the Indian Army. The Eden Gardens in Kolkata have a stand named after him.

== In popular culture ==
The 2018 biopic Subedar Joginder Singh is based on Singh's life and his action during Sino-Indian War. The lead role was played by Punjabi actor and singer Gippy Grewal.

== Notes ==
Footnotes

Citations
